= The Flying Burrito Brothers discography =

- Studio albums: 19
- Live albums: 11
- Compilation albums: 15
- Singles: 16

The following is a comprehensive discography of The Flying Burrito Brothers, an American country rock band which has evolved over time and released material under several different names. Their initial recordings were led by Gram Parsons and Chris Hillman who had recently left The Byrds. Parsons was replaced by Rick Roberts who continued to tour with the band even after the departure of Hillman. By 1975 a new lineup focused around Gib Guilbeau and other Byrds alumni such as Skip Battin and Gene Parsons. In 1977 the band recorded an album that their record company released under the name "Sierra" much to their surprise. By the 1980s, and after several lineup changes, the band was mostly associated with Gib Gilbeau and John Beland. They relented to record company pressure and once again changed the name of the band to just "The Burrito Brothers". Sneaky Pete Kleinow's pedal steel guitar playing was generally the only constant with each lineup change during this era.

John Beland "retired" the Flying Burrito Brothers name in 2000. In 2002, Sneaky Pete Kleinow and other musicians recorded under the name "Burrito Deluxe." Burrito Deluxe recorded three albums with various musicians, many of whom at one time had been members of the Flying Burrito Brothers in one capacity or another. After still more lineup changes, Burrito Deluxe recorded an album as simply "The Burritos" before reverting to their 1980s moniker: The Burrito Brothers. In 2020, The Burrito Brothers revived the Burrito Deluxe name for a rarities compilation.

== Albums ==
=== Studio albums ===
| Year | Credited As | Title | Peak chart positions |
| Year | Credited As | Title | Billboard 200 |
|---|---|---|---|
| 1969 | The Flying Burrito Brothers | The Gilded Palace of Sin | 164 |
| 1970 | The Flying Burrito Brothers | Burrito Deluxe | — |
| 1971 | The Flying Burrito Brothers | The Flying Burrito Bros | 176 |
| 1975 | The Flying Burrito Brothers | Flying Again | 138 |
| 1976 | The Flying Burrito Brothers | Airborne | — |
| 1977 | Sierra | Sierra | — |
| 1981 | The Burrito Brothers | Hearts on the Line | — |
| 1982 | The Burrito Brothers | Sunset Sundown | — |
| 1994 | The Flying Burrito Brothers | Eye of a Hurricane | — |
| 1997 | The Flying Burrito Brothers | California Jukebox | — |
| 1999 | The Flying Burrito Brothers | Sons of the Golden West | — |
| 2002 | Burrito Deluxe | Georgia Peach | — |
| 2004 | Burrito Deluxe | The Whole Enchilada | — |
| 2007 | Burrito Deluxe | Disciples of the Truth | — |
| 2011 | The Burritos | Sound As Ever | — |
| 2018 | The Burrito Brothers | Still Going Strong | — |
| 2021 | The Burrito Brothers | The Notorious Burrito Brothers | — |
| 2023 | The Burrito Brothers | Together | — |
| 2023 | The Burrito Brothers | Christmas | — |

=== Live albums ===
| Year | Credited As | Title |
|---|---|---|
| 1972 | The Flying Burrito Brothers | Last of the Red Hot Burritos |
| 1979 | The Flying Burrito Brothers | Live In Tokyo |
| 1985 | The Flying Burrito Brothers | Cabin Fever |
| 1986 | The Flying Burrito Brothers | Live From Europe |
| 1989 | The Flying Burrito Brothers | From Another Time |
| 1991 | The Flying Burrito Brothers | Close Encounters of the West Coast |
| 1992 | The Flying Burrito Brothers | Sin City |
| 2004 | The Flying Burrito Brothers | The Red Album |
| 2007 | Gram Parsons / The Flying Burrito Brothers | Gram Parsons Archives Vol.1: Live at the Avalon Ballroom 1969 |
| 2011 | The Flying Burrito Brothers | Authorized Bootleg: Fillmore East, N.Y., N.Y. Late Show, Nov. 7 1970 |
| 2021 | The Burrito Brothers | The Burrito Brothers: Live 2019 |

=== Compilation albums ===
| Year | Credited As | Title |
|---|---|---|
| 1971 | The Flying Burrito Brothers | Hot Burrito (The Netherlands) |
| 1973 | The Flying Burrito Brothers featuring Gram Parsons | Honky Tonk Heaven (The Netherlands) |
| 1974 | The Flying Burrito Brothers | Close Up the Honky Tonks |
| 1975 | The Flying Burrito Brothers | Hot Burrito 2 (The Netherlands) |
| 1976 | Gram Parsons / The Flying Burrito Brothers | Sleepless Nights |
| 1988 | The Flying Burrito Brothers | Farther Along: The Best of the Flying Burrito Brothers |
| 1995 | The Burrito Brothers | Double Barrel (recorded 1984) |
| 1995 | The Flying Burrito Brothers | Best of the Flying Burrito Brothers |
| 1996 | The Burrito Brothers | Back to the Sweethearts of the Rodeo (recorded 1987) |
| 1996 | The Flying Burrito Brothers | Out of the Blue |
| 1997 | The Flying Burrito Brothers | The Gilded Palace of Sin & Burrito Deluxe |
| 2000 | The Flying Burrito Brothers | Hot Burritos! The Flying Burrito Brothers Anthology 1969–1972 |
| 2002 | The Burrito Brothers | Best of Burrito Brothers |
| 2002 | The Flying Burrito Brothers | Sin City: The Very Best of the Flying Burrito Brothers |
| 2007 | The Flying Burrito Brothers | The Definitive Collection |
| 2020 | Burrito Deluxe | Sidelines |
| 2021 | Burrito Deluxe | Sidelines II |

=== Notable Import Releases ===
Releases listed were not released in the US in any form:

| Year | Credited As | Title | Country |
|---|---|---|---|
| 1972 | The Flying Burrito Brothers | Live in Amsterdam | Netherlands |
| 1973 | The Flying Burrito Brothers | Blue Grass Special | Netherlands |
| 1973 | The Flying Burrito Brothers | Honky Tonk Heaven | Netherlands |
| 1990 | The Flying Burrito Brothers | Hollywood Nights 1979-82 | U.K. |
| 1990 | The Flying Burrito Brothers | Southern Tracks | France |
| 1991 | The Flying Burrito Brothers | Encore: Live In Europe | U.K. |

== Singles (US) ==
| Year | Credited As | Single | US Country | Album |
|---|---|---|---|---|
| 1969 | The Flying Burrito Brothers | "The Train Song" | — | non-album single |
| 1970 | The Flying Burrito Brothers | "If You Gotta Go" | — | Burrito Deluxe |
| 1975 | The Flying Burrito Brothers | "Building Fires" | — | Flying Again |
| 1975 | The Flying Burrito Brothers | "Bon Soir Blues" | — | Flying Again |
| 1976 | The Flying Burrito Brothers | "Waitin' For Love To Begin" | — | Airborne |
| 1977 | Sierra | "Gina" | — | Sierra |
| 1979 | The Flying Burrito Brothers | "White Line Fever" | 95 | Live from Tokyo |
| 1981 | The Burrito Brothers | "She's a Friend of a Friend" | 67 | Hearts on the Line |
| 1981 | The Burrito Brothers | "Does She Wish She Was Single Again" | 20 | Hearts on the Line |
| 1981 | The Burrito Brothers | "She Belongs to Everyone but Me" | 16 | Hearts on the Line |
| 1982 | The Burrito Brothers | "If Something Should Come Between Us (Let It Be Love)" | 27 | Sunset Sundown |
| 1982 | The Burrito Brothers | "Closer to You" | 40 | Sunset Sundown |
| 1982 | The Burrito Brothers | "I'm Drinkin' Canada Dry" | 39 | Sunset Sundown |
| 1982 | The Burrito Brothers | "Blue and Broken Hearted Me" | 48 | non-album singles |
| 1984 | The Burrito Brothers | "Almost Saturday Night" | 49 | non-album singles |
| 1984 | The Burrito Brothers | "My Kind of Lady" | 53 | non-album singles |
"—" denotes release did not chart or become certified.
