= Cabin Fever (Flying Burrito Brothers album) =

Live album by The Flying Burrito Brothers
- Released: October 1985
- Genre: Country rock
- Length: 36:28
- Label: Relix
- Producer: Skip Battin

The Flying Burrito Brothers chronology
| Sunset Sundown (1982) | Cabin Fever (1985) | Live from Europe (1986) |

Professional ratings
Review scores
| Source | Rating |
|---|---|
| Allmusic | 1/5 stars |

Cabin Fever is a live album by the country rock group The Flying Burrito Brothers, released in 1985.

After John Beland and Gib Guilbeau brought the Burritos to a close in 1984, original member "Sneaky" Pete Kleinow took the opportunity to use the band's name in an effort to secure overseas club work. He re-formed the band with Skip Battin, Greg Harris and Jim Goodall, all of whom had toured with Kleinow as The Peace Seekers. The new band toured as the Flying Burrito Brothers beginning in February 1985. Cabin Fever was recorded by this incarnation of the band in the spring of 1985 to less than excited reviews.

== Track listing ==
1. "Wheels" (Chris Hillman, Gram Parsons) – 3:09
2. "Hot Burrito #2" (Chris Ethridge, Gram Parsons) – 4:01
3. "Hickory Wind" (Gram Parsons, Bob Buchanan) / "Do Right Woman" (Chips Moman, Dan Penn) – 6:29
4. "Uncle Pen" (Bill Monroe) – 4:36
5. "Louisiana Man" (Doug Kershaw) – 4:16
6. "She Belongs to Me" (Bob Dylan) – 3:41
7. "Six Days on the Road" (Earl Green, Carl Montgomery) – 3:10
8. "Mr. Spaceman" (Roger McGuinn) – 3:00
9. "Bugler" (Larry Murray) – 4:06

== Personnel ==
The Flying Burrito Brothers

- "Sneaky" Pete Kleinow - pedal steel guitar
- Skip Battin - vocals, bass
- Greg Harris - vocals, guitar
- Jim Goodall - drums
