= Dance, Dance, Dance (Neil Young song) =

Song written by Neil Young

Song by Crazy Horse

from the album Crazy Horse
- Released: February 1971
- Genre: Country rock
- Length: 2:10
- Label: Reprise
- Songwriter: Neil Young
- Producers: Jack Nitzsche; Bruce Botnick

"Dance, Dance, Dance" is a song written by Neil Young that first appeared on Crazy Horse's debut album Crazy Horse in 1971. Young has released a number of live versions of the song himself, and it has also been covered by other artists, including Dave Edmunds, The New Seekers, The Flying Burrito Brothers and Elvis Costello.

== Neil Young and Crazy Horse versions ==
"Dance, Dance, Dance" was originally recorded by Young with Crazy Horse in 1969 for a country-rock album that was never released. These recordings have been released on archival albums like Neil Young Archives and Early Daze, a collection of early Crazy Horse songs from 1969.

Allmusic critic William Ruhlmann described the Crazy Horse version of "Dance, Dance, Dance" as a "country hoedown." Cash Box called it "country flavored." Record World said that it "sounds like a reel." Young reused the melody to "Dance, Dance, Dance" for his song "Love Is a Rose" that was famously covered by Linda Ronstadt.

Young biographer Paul Williams called "Dance, Dance, Dance" a "classic" and said it is much better than "Love Is a Rose."

Young performed "Dance, Dance, Dance" live in concert from 1969 through 1971, and then in 1983, 1987 and 1992. A live version from 1971 was released on Live at Massey Hall 1971 in 2007. Allmusic critic Stephen Thomas Erlewine described this version as a "stomping hoedown." Music lecturer Ken Bielen similarly called this version a "hoedown sing-a-long performance that elicits a lot of hand-clapping on the beat.

== Cover versions ==
"Dance, Dance, Dance"

Single by The New Seekers

from the album Circles
- B-side: "I Can Say You're Beautiful"
- Released: September 1972
- Length: 2:02
- Label: Elektra Records
- Songwriter: Neil Young
- Producer: David Mackay

Dave Edmunds covered "Dance, Dance, Dance" for his 1972 album Rockpile, a version the Rolling Stone Album Guide called "successful."

The New Seekers covered "Dance, Dance, Dance" on the US version of their 1972 album Circles and also released it as a single. Billboard said that "the Neil Young rhythm material is strong for the New Seekers loaded with Top 40 and MOR potential." The single reached #84 on the Billboard Hot 100 and #24 on the Billboard Easy Listening chart.

Elvis Costello covered "Dance, Dance, Dance" live in 1972 as part of his duo Rusty with Allan Mayes, while still going by his given name of Declan MacManus.

German band Bläck Fööss released a version of the song in Colognian dialect called "Pänz Pänz Pänz" (meaning Kids, Kids, Kids) on their 1975 album "Lück wie ich un Du" (i.e. "people like me and you").

The Flying Burrito Brothers covered the song on their 1997 album California Jukebox. According to John Beland, label president Robert John Jones suggested the song as a possible cut for California Jukebox. As it turned out, Burrito Brothers' fiddler Gib Guilbeau had played the fiddle on the original Crazy Horse version and as a result he and Beland had long wanted to record the song. Guilbeau used the same fiddle on the Flying Burrito Brothers record as he did on the Crazy Horse version more than 25 years earlier. Beland stated that:

Crazy Horse cut "Dance, Dance, Dance" and wanted a fiddle on it. So the first person they called was Gib because he was the guy to call for Cajun fiddle. Nobody could touch him. So he went to play on it. He told us about it when he got back, and we always wanted to cut the tune. I don't know what happened—we never got around to doing it. It was an obvious song for us. So all through the years we talked about it. Then when we were putting tunes together for this album, Robert John said to us "Have you ever heard that Neil Young tune 'Dance, Dance, Dance'? And I said "Holy cow! Yeah! I told him Gib had played on the original record. So we went in and cut it—finally, after wanting to cut it since 1971.

Mumford & Sons recorded "Dance, Dance, Dance" live in 2010.
