= Hot Burritos! The Flying Burrito Brothers Anthology 1969–1972 =

Compilation album by The Flying Burrito Brothers
- Released: April 18, 2000
- Recorded: 1969–1972
- Genre: Country rock
- Length: 139:25
- Label: A&M
- Producer: Jim Dickson

The Flying Burrito Brothers chronology
Best of the Flying Burrito Brothers (1995)	Hot Burritos! The Flying Burrito Brothers Anthology 1969–1972 (2000)	Sin City: The Very Best of the Flying Burrito Brothers (2002)

Professional ratings
Review scores
Source	Rating
AllMusic	5/5 stars

Hot Burritos! The Flying Burrito Brothers Anthology 1969–1972 is an album by the country rock band the Flying Burrito Brothers. It was released in 2000. A forty-three song compilation on two CDs, it includes all of their first three albums — The Gilded Palace of Sin (1969), Burrito Deluxe (1970), and The Flying Burrito Bros (1971) — along with eleven additional songs.

The album's bonus tracks include the non-LP single, "The Train Song". "Ain't That a Lot of Love" and "Losing Game" were taken from the live album Last of the Red Hot Burritos (1972).

According to a note on the back cover, the entire album was "24-bit remastered from the original master tapes."

== Track listing ==
=== Disc one ===
The Gilded Palace of Sin:

1. "Christine's Tune (Devil in Disguise)" (Chris Hillman, Gram Parsons) – 3:02
2. "Sin City" (Hillman, Parsons) – 4:09
3. "Do Right Woman" (Chips Moman, Dan Penn) – 3:57
4. "Dark End of the Street" (Moman, Penn) – 3:50
5. "My Uncle" (Hillman, Parsons) – 2:37
6. "Wheels" (Hillman, Parsons) – 3:02
7. "Juanita" (Hillman, Parsons) – 2:30
8. "Hot Burrito #1" (Chris Ethridge, Parsons) – 3:37
9. "Hot Burrito #2" (Ethridge, Parsons) – 3:17
10. "Do You Know How It Feels" (Barry Goldberg, Parsons) – 2:08
11. "Hippie Boy" (Hillman, Parsons) – 4:55

Bonus track:

12. "The Train Song" (Hillman, Parsons) – 3:04

Burrito Deluxe:

13. "Lazy Days" (Parsons) – 2:58
14. "Image of Me" (Harlan Howard) – 3:19
15. "High Fashion Queen" (Hillman, Parsons) – 2:07
16. "If You Gotta Go, Go Now" (Bob Dylan) – 1:49
17. "Man in the Fog" (Bernie Leadon, Parsons) – 2:31
18. "Farther Along" (Traditional) – 4:00
19. "Older Guys" (Hillman, Leadon, Parsons) – 2:29
20. "Cody, Cody" (Hillman, Leadon, Parsons) – 2:45
21. "God's Own Singer" (Leadon) – 2:05
22. "Down in the Churchyard" (Hillman, Parsons) – 2:20
23. "Wild Horses" (Mick Jagger, Keith Richards) – 6:20

=== Disc two ===
Bonus tracks:

1. "Six Days on the Road" (Earl Green, Carl Montgomery) – 2:56
2. "Close Up the Honky Tonks" (Red Simpson) – 2:38
3. "Break My Mind" (John D. Loudermilk) – 2:22
4. "Dim Lights" (Joe Maphis, Max Fidler, Rose Lee Maphis) – 2:55
5. "Sing Me Back Home" (Merle Haggard) – 3:50
6. "Tonight the Bottle Let Me Down" (Haggard) – 2:53
7. "To Love Somebody" (Barry Gibb, Robin Gibb) – 3:19

The Flying Burrito Brothers:

8. "White Line Fever" (Haggard) – 3:16
9. "Colorado" (Rick Roberts) – 4:52
10. "Hand to Mouth" (Hillman, Roberts) – 3:44
11. "Tried So Hard" (Clark) – 3:08
12. "Just Can't Be" (Hillman, Roberts) – 4:58
13. "To Ramona" (Dylan) – 3:40
14. "Four Days of Rain" (Hillman, Roberts) – 3:39
15. "Can't You Hear Me Calling" (Hillman, Roberts) – 2:57
16. "All Alone" (Hillman, Roberts) – 2:23
17. "Why Are You Crying" (Roberts) – 3:33

Bonus tracks:

18. "Here Tonight" (Clark) – 3:02
19. "Ain't That a Lot of Love" (Homer Banks, Willia Dean "Deanie" Parker) – 3:29
20. "Losing Game" (Carr, Weaver) – 3:20

== Personnel ==
The Flying Burrito Brothers

- Gram Parsons – guitar, piano, vocals
- Chris Hillman – guitar, bass, vocals
- Bernie Leadon – guitar, vocals
- Rick Roberts – guitar, vocals
- Kenny Wertz – guitar, banjo
- "Sneaky" Pete Kleinow – pedal steel guitar
- Al Perkins – pedal steel guitar
- Chris Ethridge – bass
- Roger Bush – bass
- Michael Clarke – drums

Additional musicians

- Earl Ball – piano
- Mike Deasy – guitar
- Bob Gibson – guitar
- Jon Corneal – drums
- Eddie Hoh – drums
