= John Beland =

American singer-songwriter

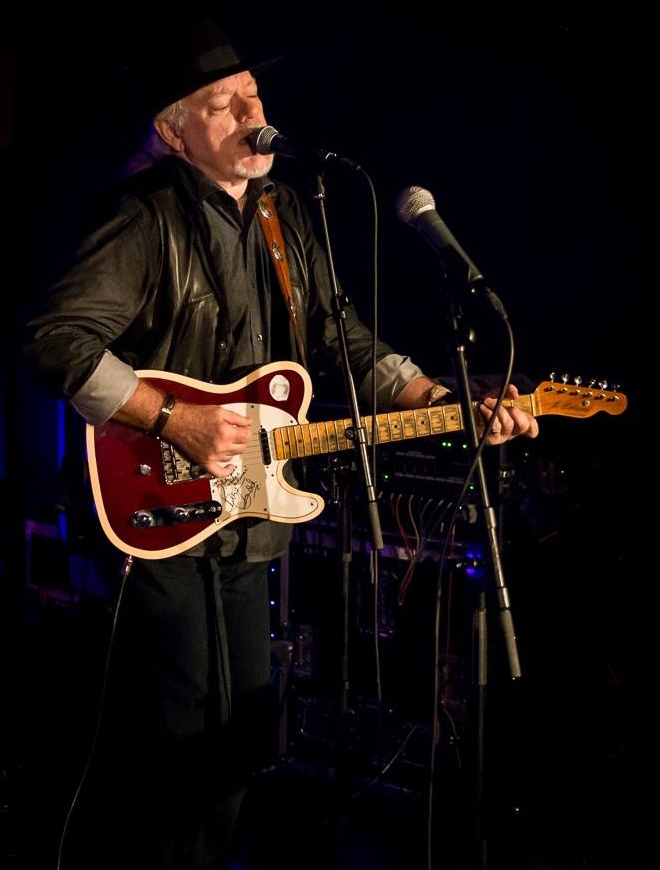
- John Beland performs live onstage in Kristiansand, Norway in September 2013

Background information
- Born: John Edward Beland; July 24, 1949 (age 76); Hometown, Illinois
- Genres: Americana, folk, country, country rock, rock and roll
- Occupations: Musician, singer-songwriter, producer
- Instruments: Guitar and mandolin
- Years active: 1960s-present
- Website: johnbeland.com

John Edward Beland (born July 24, 1949) is an American songwriter, session guitarist, recording artist, producer and author. Beland's career as guitarist started in Los Angeles in the late 1960s, playing sessions and local live gigs with Kris Kristofferson, as well as future Eagles members, Glenn Frey and Bernie Leadon. Beland's first major break came in 1970, when he played lead guitarist for a young Linda Ronstadt. He helped Ronstadt put together her first serious solo band, Swampwater. Along with bandmates Gib Guilbeau, Thad Maxwell and Stan Pratt, Swampwater toured the country with Ronstadt, appearing with her on many notable television shows including The Johnny Cash Show. Swampwater recorded two landmark country-rock albums for Starday-King and RCA Records. The group was one of the first Los Angeles bands to record in Nashville, known for their smooth harmonies and Cajun rock style.

After working with Ronstadt, Beland became a much in-demand guitarist, engaged by such high-profile artists as Arlo Guthrie, Johnny Tillotson, Kris Kristofferson, The Bellamy Brothers, Mac Davis, Dolly Parton and The Flying Burrito Brothers. As a solo artist, Beland recorded for Ranwood Records, scoring a chart hit in 1969 called "Baby You Come Rollin' 'Cross My Mind". Beland also became the last artist to sign with The Beatles' record company Apple Records in 1973. As a session guitarist, Beland recorded with many musicians in the United States and internationally. For over 20 years, he was the creative force behind the pioneering country rock band from California, Burrito Brothers. Through his leadership, the group achieved nine hit country singles for Curb Records in the early 1980s. Beland was also instrumental in the comeback of Rick Nelson in the late 1970s, arranging and playing on Nelson's last hit single "Dream Lover", as well as Nelson's album, The Memphis Sessions. He also toured and appeared with him on Saturday Night Live in 1979.

Beland has received awards from the American Society of Composers, Authors, and Publishers (ASCAP) during his career. As an award-winning songwriter, Beland's songs have been recorded by a wide variety of recording artists from various genres. They have included artists from pop, folk, gospel to country music.

== Early life ==
Beland was born and raised in Hometown, Illinois, and was the eldest son of Clarence and Celine Beland. While growing up, he listened to a number of well-known American music artists. This included Buddy Holly, the Everly Brothers and Ricky Nelson. He was inspired by the music from a young age and began to play the guitar, predominantly rock and roll. At six years old, he received a toy Davy Crockett model guitar, but wouldn't own a guitar until he was seventeen.

During high school, Beland played with local bands, performing in small venues and at private parties. He practiced on his own at home, while listening to Dick Biondi on WLS radio. In an interview, Beland recalled the influence The Beatles had on his life as a young musician. He stated that he had never heard music like it and inspired him as a guitarist.

Beland became more involved in local music over the coming years as a teenager. He took little interest in school, instead, he focused on practicing blues and jazz tracks that were popular at the time, including Mose Allison, Ramsey Lewis and Bo Diddley. He was also strongly influenced by the Rolling Stones. He formed a small jazz trio in his hometown and regularly played small gigs. They would take pop songs and, as Beland described it, "jazz them up". Performing these musical blends further influenced Beland's youth. As his tastes and performances matured, Beland began to have a passion for jazz pianist Vince Guaraldi's music. His biggest inspiration as a teenager was The Byrds. He recalled hearing The Byrds' single "Mr. Tambourine Man" for the first time and being instantly connected and inspired by the Bob Dylan written track. As Beland performed more regularly, his music began to take on The Byrds' sound, showing how they had influenced him as a young musician.

Beland's life changed in 1967 when his father secured a new job, meaning the family would be moving to Los Angeles. They took a 3-day train journey from Chicago to California. They ended up living an hour outside Los Angeles, in the town of La Puente. Beland didn't attend his new school in Southern California and instead spent his days sneaking into movie studios and record companies to learn more about passions of filmmaking and music. When his family and the school realized what he was doing on a daily basis, they moved him to a continuation school for troubled teens. Determined to follow his dreams of becoming a musician, Beland recorded a dozen original tracks on a stolen tape recorder. When he was dropped at continuation school the next day, he hitchhiked to Los Angeles in hope of getting a record deal.

He lived on the streets for a couple of weeks after leaving home, speaking to publishing companies and record labels on a daily basis and showing them his homemade demo tape. After speaking to a record executive at Capitol Records, he advised Beland to try playing live at a club in Los Angeles called the Troubadour. Every Monday he attended open mic night at the venue and for $1 he would be able to perform for 15 minutes. He became well known by performers and regulars at the club, before host, Larry Murray decided to showcase Beland at the primetime slot in front of numerous record label executives.

After performing one night at the Troubadour, he was approached by Lois Dalton, who was a former member of The Back Porch Majority folk group. She had set up their own music production group and she offered to help Beland in any way she could. After weeks of living on the street, Beland was desperate for somewhere to stay. Dalton and her family took him in. Dalton spoke with Beland's parents and it was decided he would stay with the Dalton's in Los Angeles to pursue his music career under her guidance.

== Music career ==
=== Career beginnings (1960s) ===
Beland spent much of his early career living with Dan and Lois Dalton and their family. Under their guidance, he signed a music publishing deal, which allowed him to buy his first ever guitar, a Guild F-50. Dan Dalton began to use Beland on many of their music production group's tracks, which ended up securing Beland a solo record deal. He started on The Glen Campbell Goodtime Hour, playing to the studio audience between set changes at a rate of $250 a week. Engelbert Humperdinck recorded one of Beland's tracks, titled Nashville Lady, which secured Beland more income.

Around the same time as his The Glen Campbell Goodtime Hour performances, he befriended two struggling singer-songwriters, Glenn Frey and JD Souther. Both musicians would play for food and beer as a duo Longbranch Pennywhistle. Beland joined them playing on gigs as they reminded him of the Everly Brothers. He also worked with R.B. Greaves when he was a young struggling songwriter before he had his number 1 single in 1969.

Beland's luck changed over the next couple of months as he and Lois Dalton sang the theme song for the popular sitcom and ABC's hit show, The Brady Bunch. He continued to attend Troubadour, where he was introduced to Kris Kristofferson, a musician from Nashville, Tennessee. It was decided that Beland would back up the performer on acoustic guitar for Kristofferson. They performed three tracks, "Help Me Make It Through the Night", "For the Good Times", and "Me and Bobby McGee". According to Beland, all three received a cold reception.

In 1969, Beland answered an ad in The Hollywood Reporter calling for lead guitarists who could sing harmony. As an 18-year-old guitarist, he felt he needed the experience. It was for a new group called One Man's Family, which consisted of members of the pop group, Spanky and Our Gang. With the assistance of the Dalton's, Beland decided to take the role after it was offered to him. While he was rehearsing with One Man's Family, Beland started to spend more time with Linda Ronstadt, who knew members of the One Man's Family. She and Beland hit it off and she asked Beland if he would join her new solo band, as she had decided to quit the Stone Poneys who she was playing with at the time. Beland took the decision to stay with One Man's Family, as they had given him the opportunity to perform. He and Ronstadt remained on good terms and she stated that a position in her band would always be open to him.

One Man's Family toured across the United States in late 1969, with Beland as their lead guitarist. They opened for groups such as Steppenwolf, The Hollies and The Byrds. At a concert in Chicago, he met Clarence White, where he was fascinated by his Telecaster way of playing. Shortly after the concert, One Man's Family suddenly split after Nigel Pickering quit the band. Beland immediately phoned Linda Ronstadt, who told him she had a guitar gig for him if he wanted it.

=== Early career and Swampwater (1970–1976) ===
Beland moved back to Los Angeles and joined Linda Ronstadt's first solo band. With Ronstadt's band, Beland toured the United States, performing at the Capitol Records Convention; Fillmore West with The Byrds; the Big Sur celebration with The Beach Boys and also at Troubadour. At the Troubadour gig, Kris Kristofferson was the opening act. After speaking with Kristofferson, Beland decided to join his band too at $35 for a week run. Kristofferson played the same songs he had played with Beland a year prior, but this time had a much better reception. Beland's connection with the Troubadour remained for a number of years, where he saw debut performances by The Carpenters, Poco and Elton John. He also met a band there called The Flying Burrito Brothers.

Ronstadt's bass player was replaced in the early 1970s by Beland's friend and former One Man's Family band member, Thad Maxwell. Shortly after Maxwell joined Linda Ronstadt's band, the backing band started their own band called Swampwater. Their sound was a combination of Guilbeau's hard driving Cajun rock and Beland's Byrds-Beach Boys style harmonies. Shortly after the formation of Swampwater, they were signed by the Nashville-based Starday-King Records and secured an album deal. The group recorded their first album in Albuquerque, New Mexico with John Wagner as the producer. They created a country hit titled "Take A City Bride". The track was the first Los Angeles-based band to score a Billboard country hit single.

Swampwater became closely connected to The Byrds, due in part to Gib Guilbeau's connection with Clarence White and Gene Parsons, before they joined the legendary group. The close connection to The Byrds gave the band huge exposure to record executives in Los Angeles. Beland subbed in for Clarence White on numerous recordings for The Byrds, due to his similar sound and style when White was unavailable. Swampwater left Starday-King after recording one album and signed with RCA for a new album that would be produced by Larry Murray. Many of the sessions took place in Los Angeles and Nashville. Unfortunately, the production on the second album wasn't as good as Beland had hoped. In later interviews, Beland stated that at this time he had become disillusioned with the direction of the band.

Despite the position of Swampwater, Beland continued to play on sessions for other Los Angeles-based artists, such as James Taylor's sister Kate Taylor. He was hired by Arlo Guthrie to play in a house band along with Ry Cooder, Gib Guilbeau and The Flying Burrito Brothers bassist Chris Ethridge, for the Tribute to Woody Guthrie concert at the Hollywood Bowl. The concert received huge public acclaim and the live recording of the concert is in the Library of Congress.

Swampwater and Linda Ronstadt parted ways in 1971 to become the new backing band touring the country with singer-songwriter Arlo Guthrie. While in Chicago, they learned a new song written by Steve Goodman during a soundcheck. All the band members were fans of the song and began to play it during their tours. It would go on to become an iconic song titled, the "City Of New Orleans". Guthrie and Swampwater also played Carnegie Hall that year, but Beland grew tired of Swampwater's lack of commercial chart progress and quit the band in 1972 to pursue a solo career and concentrate on playing for other acts.

Beland became music director and guitarist for the country pop star Johnny Tillotson. Tillotson and Beland traveled the world together, performing throughout the United States, as well as Germany and the United Kingdom. While touring with Tillotson, he was introduced to Tony King, who was the head of Apple Records. He forwarded on a tape of Beland's recordings to Ringo Starr, who approved Beland to be signed as a solo artist to Apple Records. He returned to Los Angeles to work on his new solo album. Beland did not complete the solo album under Apple Records, due to The Beatles' pending litigation against their manager Allen Klein. He remained focused on the project and eventually finished the solo album in 1973 with Scepter Records. The album was titled, John Edward Beland. Following the release of the album, he continued to tour and record with Johnny Tillotson and remained an in-demand studio guitarist.

Kris Kristofferson hired him again in 1973 after working with him numerous times at the Troubadour. Kristofferson by this point was a household name in music. He toured the country with Kristofferson and his wife Rita Coolidge, meaning Beland had to end touring with Tillotson. He became a featured part of Kristofferson's show, as well as playing on their albums, in concerts and television appearances. In 1975, Beland left the band, citing Kristofferson's drinking issues as the main reason. Not long afterward, Beland was hired by emerging singer-songwriter, Kim Carnes. He played on her albums, St. Vincent's Court and Sailing, as well as backing her on tour as an opening act for the pop star Neil Sedaka, who was enjoying a comeback at the time.

Fortuitously, two brothers from Florida, Howard and David Bellamy, arrived in Los Angeles in 1976. They had just scored a massive hit with "Let Your Love Flow". New to the local scene, they hired Beland to record with them. He played on their records and helped them form their first touring band. Later that year, The Bellamy Brothers, with Beland leading the band, joined Loggins and Messina on tour. The Bellamys' follow-up single, "Crossfire", was a hit in Europe, featuring Beland's signature big electric guitar sound that actually inspired Bonnie Tyler's record, "It's A Heartache". "Crossfire" failed to sustain The Bellamys, and after a major equipment robbery in Chicago, Beland left the act. Mac Davis then hired Beland in 1977. He toured the country with Davis, primarily working Las Vegas, but lost interest in Davis' slick cabaret-style show. While on tour in New England, Beland became close friends with Davis' opening act, Dolly Parton. Beland and Parton became friends. Soon after returning to Los Angeles, he parted ways with Davis and became Parton's guitarist. Her new single "Here You Come Again" was released that year, and her career skyrocketed. Beland then began to tour with Parton throughout the United States.

=== Dolly Parton, Ricky Nelson and The Flying Burrito Brothers (1977–1989) ===
During the Parton tour, Beland got a call from Greg McDonald, the manager of Rick Nelson. McDonald explained that Nelson was planning to get back to his rock and roll roots by putting together a great band that matched the caliber of his early TV days. Beland's reputation as a James Burton-style player made him Nelson's choice for the new lead guitarist. The new band would make its debut with Nelson in Las Vegas. Sweet Inspirations, the same group that backed Elvis Presley in his Vegas appearances, provided the vocal back-up for Nelson. As a big fan of Nelson, Beland knew his hits up and down. Nelson worked up many of his old hits that he had not played for years, mostly because past members and producers had told him how dated they were. On days off with Parton, Beland played gigs with Nelson. Beland had cut his teeth on Nelson's hits and was his biggest fan. He knew all the classic guitar solos left to right, just like on the records, and his style was reminiscent of Nelson's original guitarist, James Burton. Touring with Dolly Parton and playing with Nelson at the same time became wearing for Beland. The meteoric rise in her popularity brought on a huge entourage of management, agents, band members, and politics. The intimate relationship he once shared with her had dwindled, and he felt that it was time to move on. Parton discussed it with him; she noticed how excited he seemed to be working with Rick Nelson. With her blessing, Beland turned in his notice to Parton and became Rick Nelson's full-time guitarist. Beland played on Nelson's latest recording project produced by Al Kooper, but from the start, he felt that the material was shoddy and far removed from Nelson's true style. The sessions at Sunset Sound were disorganized and disappointing. Kooper did his best, but in the end, the entire album was scrapped.

Beland then received a call from McDonald about going to Memphis, Tennessee alone with Nelson and recording an album that captured his country rock style mixes with his love for old rock and roll. This would be Nelson's first time recording away from Los Angeles, and it would just be he and Beland traveling there with a local house rhythm section waiting for them. Larry Rogers produced the sessions at his 16-track studio in a rough part of Memphis. Like Beland, Rogers was a Nelson fan, and the team hit it off like old friends. Beland arranged most of the material and co-wrote one of the songs with Nelson the night before the session, called "That Ain't The Way Love's Supposed To Be". Beland also came up with a new arrangement for an old Bobby Darin song, called "Dream Lover". The track started as a fast-driving teen anthem before Beland slowed it down to have a James Taylor feel, reminiscent of Nelson's old version of Bob Dylan's "She Belongs To Me". "Dream Lover" sounded like a smash hit and was planned for release as a single to coincide with Nelson's hosting of the top TV show in the country, Saturday Night Live.

At the time of working with Ric Nelson, Beland received an offer to work with the legendary band, The Flying Burrito Brothers. At first, Beland passed on the opportunity as he felt they had lost their way and had no record deal. However, after discussions with his publisher Bo Golsen at Atlantic Records, Beland decided to join the band, providing he could produce and write for the group. The band agreed, so Beland reluctantly said goodbye to Nelson. Bobby Neil would take over his guitar spot, continuing until both of their deaths in that fateful 1985 plane crash.

Beland took the members of The Flying Burrito Brothers into the 16-track studio at Atlantic Records, where they demoed a number of country style songs Beland had written along with fellow Burrito member Gib Guilbeau, his old bandmate from Swampwater. The demos were highly commercial, so Bo Golsen immediately took them to Curb Records' A&R head Dick Whitehouse, who offered the group a deal, under one condition: The label wanted one of their own to produce the band. Beland would not hear of it and threatened to quit. But Golsen reminded him of the opportunity ahead if he played along. Beland agreed reluctantly to the deal and soon producer Michael Lloyd was assigned to the band. Although Beland and Lloyd got along together in the studio, Beland hated the idea of having to turn over the reins to another producer, especially one he did not want in the first place. Lloyd had produced acts like The Osmonds and The Bellamy Brothers, and although he had success with them, Beland felt his production work was too lightweight for a band like The Flying Burrito Brothers.

Despite Beland's objections related to producing, The Burrito Brothers (who had now dropped "Flying") went on to score major country hits, a first in their ten-year prior history. Certain band members objected to the new country direction, and as a result was fired. The act became a duo. Beland also objected to using any part of The Burrito Brothers' name and suggested that he and Gib Guilbeau change it completely, but the record label refused. Although he and Guilbeau's history was just as extensive as any past members of The Flying Burrito Brothers, critics still chastised them for using the name. Despite the critics, Beland and Guilbeau went on to score hit after hit in years to come, songs like "She Belongs To Everyone But Me", "Closer To You", "I'm Drinking Canada Dry", "Does She Wish She Was Single Again" and others, many penned by Beland and Guilbeau. The Burrito Brothers were now a hit country act for Curb/CBS, touring the world and appearing on TV throughout the country. They also performed at the International Country Music Festival in London's Wembley Stadium with Waylon Jennings, The Bellamy Brothers, George Jones, Jerry Lee Lewis, and Tammy Wynette.

In 1981, they received the Billboard number-one music award for making the transition from pop to country music. They also received Record World Magazine's award for "Best New Vocal Group of 1981". A year later, they spearheaded a campaign which helped get their idol, the late country music legend Lefty Frizzell, inducted into the Country Music Hall of Fame. That same year, both Beland and Guilbeau moved from California to Nashville to become a true part of the country music industry. Beland went right to work doing sessions, while Guilbeau concentrated on songwriting. Through it all, problems with Curb Records persisted. A third album produced by Randy Scruggs was shelved, even though it yielded two hits, "Blue and Broken Hearted Me" and "Would You Love Me One More Time". Beland lobbied for a producing role but continued to be ignored by the label.

In 1983, they were teamed with producer Brent Maher, who produced The Judds. Beland approved this development, as the two had worked together on his solo album in 1972 when Maher was an engineer at Las Vegas Sound. Now Maher was a hot producer, and he and Beland worked well together. The single they did was an old John Fogerty song called, "It's Almost Saturday Night". Both Beland and Guilbeau were excited about this recording because it was reminiscent of their days with Swampwater. It had the big sound of Guilbeau's fiddle, matched with Beland's big Telecaster. The single was a hit, but then Curb fired Mayer over a financial dispute, and the duo was back to no producer.

Beland and Guilbeau, as The Burrito Brothers, toured the world in the early to mid-1980s, performing in France, Italy, Spain, Germany, Switzerland, Austria, the Netherlands, Norway, Australia, New Zealand, Canada, and the United Kingdom, as well as throughout the United States. Finally, in the mid-1980s, Beland and Guilbeau called it quits due to creative differences. They made their last appearance together as The Burrito Brothers on "Nashville Now" to a standing ovation from the studio audience. Through the latter part of the 1980s, Beland remained in Nashville. He wrote the number two Gospel Record of the Year for former Grand Funk Railroad lead singer Mark Farner, called "Isn't It Amazing". Beland also hit the road playing guitar for pop singer Nicolette Larson and toured the world many times playing guitar for country music legend, Bobby Bare.

=== Later career (1990s–present) ===
In 1990, Beland received a call from David and Howard Bellamy, asking if he would be interested in playing guitar for them again. By now, The Bellamy Brothers were a household name, having scored more country hits than any duo in history. At first, he turned them down, not wanting to tour behind any more artists, to concentrate on his writing and session work. But The Bellamys were persistent. Beland joined them, hoping to write with the act, that was now selling millions of records worldwide. Beland immediately went to work playing on their albums, starting with "She Don't Know That She's Perfect" and "Can I Come On Home To You". Beland toured the world with the Bellamy Brothers, performing three or four times a year in Europe, where the act was huge. The Bellamys also performed nonstop throughout the United States. In 1992, Beland finally co-wrote with David Bellamy, yielding the huge hit single, "Cowboy Beat". He and Howard Bellamy also co-wrote their follow-up hit, "Hard Way To Make An Easy Living". Beland received an ASCAP Award for his co-writing of "Cowboy Beat" in 1993. Ultimately, the heavy touring schedule proved to be too much for Beland. He said goodbye to the Bellamy Brothers in 1993.

Meanwhile, The Flying Burrito Brothers reunited in the mid-1990s. Beland took control and produced the band's three critically acclaimed studio albums, Eye of a Hurricane (1994), California Jukebox (1997), and Sons of the Golden West (1999). During the recordings, Beland produced guest performances with Merle Haggard, Waylon Jennings, Ricky Skaggs, Buck Owens, The Oakridge Boys and Charlie Louvin. Beland and The Flying Burrito Brothers toured Europe at the end of the 1990s, performing throughout Germany, Spain, and Switzerland, before finally calling it quits in 2000.

In 1999, Beland and his family moved to Napa, California, where he concentrated on producing radio jingles and musical acts in Australia and Germany. In 2002, he received a call from actor and songwriter Billy Bob Thornton, who asked Beland if he would be interested in recording and touring with him. Beland rehearsed in Beverly Hills with Thornton but eventually passed on touring with him, opting to go instead to Australia to record, produce and perform. In 2003, Beland toured solo through Great Britain and Ireland before returning to the United States and settling near Austin, Texas. There he produced a number of Texas country acts. Beland also traveled to Norway to produce country acts and perform as a solo artist at festivals and clubs. He built up a strong following throughout Norway and continued to perform there quite often through the years.

In recent years, Beland continues to produce artists and perform solo. When not recording or performing, he is hard at work on his upcoming, long-awaited biography, Best Seat in the House, as well as hosting his own radio talk show of the same name, featuring guests such as Dolly Parton and other major names he has played behind over his 40-plus year career.

== Recognition ==
- Billboard Magazine: Best Crossover Award (1981)
- Record World Magazine: Best New Vocal Group (as part of The Burrito Brothers) (1981)
- Dove Nomination: "Isn't It Amazing" (1989)
- ASCAP: "Cowboy Beat" (1993)

== Discography ==
Year	Role	Title	Release	Record Label
1967	Solo artist	As If I Needed To Be Reminded	Single	Ranwood Records
1968	Solo artist	"Baby You Come Rollin' 'Cross My Mind"	Single	Ranwood Records
1968	Producer	"The Brady Bunch"	TV Theme	ABC Paramount
1969	Solo artist	"Will You Love Me Tomorrow"	Single	Ranwood Records
1970	Member of Swampwater	"Swampwater"'	LP	Starday-King Records
1970	Session guitarist	Odetta Sings	LP	Polydor Records
1970	Session guitarist	Celebration at Big Sur	LP	Ode Records
1971	Session guitarist	"She's A Very Lonely Woman"	LP	Capitol Records
1971	Session guitarist	Sweet Country Suite	LP	MGM Records
1971	Session guitarist	Sister Kate	LP	Atlantic Records
1971	Session guitarist	"Various Artists A Tribute To Woody Guthrie"	LP	Warner Bros. Records
1973	Solo artist	"John Edward Beland"	LP	Scepter Records
1973	Solo artist	"Banjo Man"	Single	Scepter Records
1974	Session guitarist	"Spooky Lady's Sideshow"	LP	Monument Records
1974	Session guitarist	"Nice Feelin'"	LP	A&M Records
1974	Session guitarist	"Bob Neuwirth"	LP	Asylum Records
1976	Session guitarist	"Plain & Fancy"	LP	Curb Records
1976	Session guitarist	"Homemade Love"	LP	Farr Records
1976	Session guitarist	"Homemade Love"	Single	Farr Records
1976	Session guitarist	"Sad Country Love Song"	Single	Farr Records
1976	Session guitarist	"(Hey Daisy) Where Have All the Good Times Gone?"	Single	Farr Records
1976	Session guitarist	"Crossfire"	Single	Curb Records
1976	Session guitarist	"Bound to Explode"	Single	Curb Records
1977	Solo artist	"Close Your Eyes and It's Daniel"	Single	Atlantic Records
1978	Solo artist	"Emmy"	Single	Atlantic Records
1978	Session guitarist	"Goodnight Vienna"	LP	Capitol Records
1978	Session guitarist	"St. Vincent's Court"	LP	EMI
1979	Session guitarist	"The Memphis Sessions"	LP	Capitol Records
1979	Session guitarist	"Dream Lover"	Single	Capitol Records
1980	The Flying Burrito Brothers	"Hearts on the Line"	LP	Curb Records
1980	The Flying Burrito Brothers	"She's a Friend of a Friend"	Single	Curb Records
1980	The Flying Burrito Brothers	"Does She Wish She Was Single Again"	Single	Curb Records
1980	The Flying Burrito Brothers	"She Belongs to Everyone but Me"	Single	Curb Records
1980	The Flying Burrito Brothers	"Does She Wish She Was Single Again"	LP	Curb Records
1980	The Flying Burrito Brothers	"She Belongs to Everyone but Me"	Single	Curb Records
1981	The Flying Burrito Brothers	"Sunset Sundown"	LP	Curb Records
1981	The Flying Burrito Brothers	"If Something Should Come Between Us (Let It Be Love)"	Single	Curb Records
1981	The Flying Burrito Brothers	"Closer to You"	Single	Curb Records
1981	The Flying Burrito Brothers	"I'm Drinking Canada Dry"	Single	Curb Records
1983	The Burrito Brothers & Earl Scruggs	"Top of the World"	LP	CBS Records
1983	The Burrito Brothers	"Would You Love Me One More Time"	Single	CBS Records
1983	The Burrito Brothers	"It's Almost Saturday Night"	Single	CBS Records
1983	The Burrito Brothers	"Would You Love Me One More Time"	Single	CBS Records
1983	The Burrito Brothers	"My Kind of Lady"	Single	CBS Records
1984	The Burrito Brothers	"Back To The Sweethearts Of The Rodeo"	LP	Disky Records
1988	The Flying Burrito Brothers	"Southern Tracks"	LP	Voodoo Records
1990	Session guitarist	"She Don't Know That She's Perfect"	Single	MCA Records
1992	Session guitarist	"Cowboy Beat"	Single	Bellamy Brothers Records
1993	Session guitarist	"Hard Way to Make an Easy Living"	Single	Bellamy Brothers Records
1994	Session guitarist	"Let's Do It Again"	Single	Sony Records
1994	The Flying Burrito Brothers	"Eye of a Hurricane"	LP	Magnum Music
1997	The Flying Burrito Brothers	"California Jukebox"	LP	Ice House Records
1999	The Flying Burrito Brothers	"Sons of the Golden West"	LP	Grateful Dead Records
