= Live from Tokyo (album) =

Live album by The Flying Burrito Brothers
- Released: June 1979
- Genre: Country rock
- Label: Regency
- Producer: The Flying Burrito Brothers

The Flying Burrito Brothers chronology
Airborne (1976)	Live from Tokyo (1979)	Hearts on the Line (As The Burrito Brothers) (1981)

Alternate cover
- 1991 Relix Records rerelease

Professional ratings
Review scores
Source	Rating
Allmusic	2/5 stars

Live from Tokyo is the second live album by the country rock group The Flying Burrito Brothers, released in 1979. It was originally released in Japan in 1978 under the title Close Encounters on the West Coast.

== History ==
After the release of Airborne and the subsequent dropping of the band by Columbia Records, the Flying Burrito Brothers pressed on as a touring act, taking a small break in 1977 so that Gib Guilbeau and "Sneaky" Pete Kleinow could release an album on Mercury Records under the name Sierra. After Sierra's eponymous debut album failed to achieve commercial success, Guilbeau, Kleinow and Sierra drummer Mickey McGee reunited with Skip Battin and Gene Parsons (playing guitar due to a wrist injury) and began to tour as the Flying Burrito Brothers again. By 1979, Greg Harris and Ed Ponder were hired to replace Joel Scott Hill and Mickey McGee respectively. During this time, Gene Parsons also left the group and was not replaced. This shuffled lineup of the band released Live from Tokyo on Tennessee-based Regency Records to public and critical indifference, however the album's single, a cover of Merle Haggard's "White Line Fever", reached the lower-end of the US country music charts (the first Burritos single ever to enter the charts). This would mark the beginning of a three-year stretch of commercial success for the band.

== Rerelease ==
In 1991, the album was released on CD on Relix Records under the original name Close Encounters on the West Coast. The re-release also features the original art-work.

== Track listing ==
1. "Big Bayou" (Gib Guilbeau)–3:53
2. "White Line Fever" (Merle Haggard)–3:41
3. "Dim Lights, Thick Smoke (And Loud, Loud Music)" (Lee Maphis, Joe Maphis, Max M. Fidler)–2:51
4. "There'll Be No Teardrops Tonight" (Hank Williams)–2:52
5. "Roll in My Sweet Baby's Arms" (Buck Owens)–2:35
6. "Hot Burrito #2" (Chris Ethridge, Gram Parsons)–4:41
7. "Colorado" (Rick Roberts)–4:16
8. "Rocky Top" (Boudleaux Bryant)–3:37
9. "Six Days on the Road" (Carl Montgomery, Earl B. Green)–4:14
10. "Truck Drivin' Man" (Terry Fell)–3:21

== Personnel ==
The Flying Burrito Brothers

- "Sneaky" Pete Kleinow - vocals, pedal steel guitar
- Gib Guilbeau - vocals, fiddle, rhythm guitar
- Skip Battin - vocals, bass
- Greg Harris - vocals, banjo, guitar
- Ed Ponder - drums
