= Live from Europe =

Live album by The Flying Burrito Brothers
- Released: 1986
- Genre: Country rock
- Length: 32:49
- Label: Relix
- Producer: The Flying Burrito Brothers

The Flying Burrito Brothers chronology
Cabin Fever (1985)	Live from Europe (1986)	Eye of a Hurricane (1993)

Professional ratings
Review scores
Source	Rating
AllMusic	2/5 stars
The Encyclopedia of Popular Music	2/5 stars
MusicHound Folk: The Essential Album Guide	2/5 stars

Live from Europe is a live album by the country rock group The Flying Burrito Brothers, released in 1986. It contains songs recorded live for a Dutch radio broadcast and features the same lineup as Cabin Fever. Skip Battin would leave the band in mid-1986 and be replaced by David Vaught for some shows.

After the conclusion of touring commitments in 1987, "Sneaky" Pete Kleinow and Gib Guilbeau reunited and recorded some songs for a new Flying Burrito Brothers album with Ray Tabia and Guilbeau's son Ronnie. These recordings remain unreleased. Nothing was heard from the Burritos in 1988; however, Kleinow and Guilbeau reunited with John Beland and former colleagues Thad Maxwell and Jim Goodall for a few Burritos shows in Las Vegas and southern California.

== Track listing ==
1. "Streets of Baltimore" (Tompall Glaser, Harlan Howard) – 3:15
2. "Cash on the Barrelhead" (Charlie Louvin, Ira Louvin) – 2:25
3. "Mystery Train" (Junior Parker, Sam Phillips) – 4:04
4. "Christine's Tune (A.K.A. Devil in Disguise)" (Chris Hillman, Gram Parsons) – 3:35
5. "Take a City Bride" (Gib Guilbeau) – 3:03
6. "Come a Little Closer" () – 3:22
7. "Blue Eyes" (Gram Parsons) – 2:41
8. "Citizen Kane" (Skip Battin, Kim Fowley) – 4:19
9. "Don't Go Down the Drain" (Skip Battin) – 3:23
10. "Help Is on Its Way" () – 2:42

== Personnel ==
The Flying Burrito Brothers

- "Sneaky" Pete Kleinow - pedal steel guitar
- Skip Battin - vocals, bass
- Greg Harris - vocals, guitar
- Jim Goodall - drums
