= Who's Gonna Love You (disambiguation) =

"Who's Gonna Love You" is a song by the Canadian-American singer-songwriter Tebey

Who's Gonna Love You may also refer to:

- "Who's Gonna Love You", a song by Burrito Deluxe from Disciples of the Truth
- "Who's Gonna Love You", a song by Highway 101 from The New Frontier
- "Who's Gonna Love You", a song by the Pussycat Dolls from Doll Domination
- "Who's Gonna Love You", a song by Leanne & Naara
