= Swampwater =

American country rock band

- Genres: Country rock, cajun
- Years active: 1968–1971, 1979
- Past members: John Beland; Gib Guilbeau; Eric White; Thad Maxwell; Stan Pratt; Mickey McGee

Swampwater was an American country rock band, that formed and started out initially as Linda Ronstadt’s backing group in the late 1960s, soon after she went solo. They are famous for incorporating cajun and swamp rock elements into their music. Its members included cajun fiddler Gib Guilbeau, John Beland, before either of them joined The Flying Burrito Brothers, with Stan Pratt, Thad Maxwell, and Eric White (Clarence White of The Byrds' brother). Swampwater would go on to back Ronstadt in 1971 on TV's The Johnny Cash Show, and their appearance on the show would help Swampwater secure a recording contract with RCA.

They combined California country rock with influences from bands such as The Byrds, The Dillards, Hearts & Flowers, the Beach Boys and The Everly Brothers. Their stylized guitar riffs would coincidentally be influential in the early records of the Eagles.

== Career ==
Guilbeau and Gene Parsons had released a few early country-rock singles in the late 1960s, as well as an album which was released in 1970, although recorded in 1968. The two recruited Clarence White in 1968 to record the Nashville West album. Eric White was also in the band and, prior to forming Swampwater, had been in the Kentucky Colonels. Swampwater made two albums in the early 1970s without Linda Ronstadt's involvement.

Swampwater's first album, titled Swampwater, was released on Starday King Records in 1971. The album was recorded in four days in New Mexico, at a four track studio owned and operated by the record producer, John Wagner. The band was in between touring with Ronstadt. The band's second album was also titled Swampwater, but this time was released by RCA. The album was recorded in Hollywood, California as well as in Nashville, Tennessee. In Nashville, Swampwater used steel guitarists, Curly Chalker and Jimmy Day.

Reviewing the 1971 Swampwater LP, Robert Christgau wrote in Christgau's Record Guide: Rock Albums of the Seventies (1981): "On their own Linda Ronstadt's backup boys prove honest country-rockers, which is like (and probably is) honest folkies with more chops. Very tuneful in a variety of styles, with Gib Guilbeau's fiddle pushing toward the bayous and John Beland's guitar pulling 'em back to L.A. But their best lyric is about a dancing bear, and their version of 'Headed for the Country' is less bathetic than Johnny Darrell's only because they couldn't project big emotions if they wanted to."

Swampwater can be heard on Larry Murray's Verve debut album, Sweet Country Suite. After leaving Ronstadt, the band went to work with the singer-songwriter, Arlo Guthrie, touring the country and appearing with him at the Hollywood Bowl.

Beland left the group to embark on a solo career, and was signed to Apple Records while on tour in the UK in 1972. The band continued on for a few months with Guthrie, but soon disbanded. Guilbeau went on to join the Flying Burrito Brothers, as well as a brief stint with the New Riders of the Purple Sage. A reunion was attempted in 1979 with Mickey McGee on drums. This resulted in the album Reunion that was not released until 1987. By 1980, both Beland and McGee joined Guilbeau in the Flying Burrito Brothers. This re-union led to nine hit country singles in the 1980s.

In 2016, a possible reunion funded by a kickstarter campaign began but has since gone dormant.

== Members ==
- John Beland – vocals, guitar, piano (1968–1971, 1979)
- Gib Guilbeau – vocals, guitar, fiddle (1968–1971, 1979)
- Eric White – bass (1968–1969)
- Thad Maxwell – bass (1969–1971, 1979)
- Stan Pratt – drums (1968–1971)
- Herb Pedersen – guitar/vocals (1971)
- Mickey McGee – drums (1979)

== Discography ==
- Swampwater (1970)
- Swampwater (1971)
- Reunion (1987)
