= Airborne (The Flying Burrito Brothers album) =

Studio album by The Flying Burrito Brothers
- Released: June 1976
- Genre: Country rock
- Length: 40:25
- Label: Columbia
- Producer: John Fischbach

The Flying Burrito Brothers chronology
Flying Again (1975)	Airborne (1976)	Live from Tokyo (1979)

Professional ratings
Review scores
Source	Rating
AllMusic	1.5/5 stars
Classic Rock	5/10 stars

Airborne is the fifth studio album by the country rock group The Flying Burrito Brothers, released in 1976.

After the release of Flying Again to abysmal reviews, bassist and founding member Chris Ethridge left the band and was replaced by former Byrds bassist Skip Battin. This left "Sneaky" Pete Kleinow as the only original member in the band. Airborne was the band's second and last album for Columbia Records, as the label would drop the Burritos due to the lack of commercial success just after this album's release.

== Track listing ==
1. "Out of Control" (Gib Guilbeau, Gene Parsons) – 3:52
2. "Waitin' for Love to Begin" (Pete Kleinow, Guilbeau) – 2:48
3. "Toe Tappin' Music" (Guilbeau) – 3:18
4. "Quiet Man" (John Prine) – 3:51
5. "Northbound Bus" (Nickey Barclay) – 4:00
6. "Big Bayou" (Guilbeau) – 3:31
7. "Walk on the Water" (Guilbeau, Joel Scott Hill) – 3:30
8. "Linda Lu" (Ray Sharpe) – 3:07
9. "Border Town" (Hill, Michael Lawson) – 3:46
10. "She's a Sailor" (Stevie Wonder) – 5:02
11. "Jesus Broke the Wild Horse" (Steven Glick, Dennis Krause) – 3:40

== Personnel ==
The Flying Burrito Brothers

- "Sneaky" Pete Kleinow — pedal steel guitar
- Skip Battin — vocals, guitar, bass
- Joel Scott Hill — vocals, guitar
- Gib Guilbeau — vocals, guitar, mandolin, fiddle
- Gene Parsons — vocals, drums, guitar, harmonica, banjo

Additional personnel

- Luis Cabaza — piano
- Vabo — piano
- Jamie Faunt — bass
- Stevie Wonder — piano on "She's a Sailor"
- Warren "Bugs" Pemberton — drums
