= Sons of the Golden West =

Studio album by The Flying Burrito Brothers
- Released: May 18, 1999
- Genre: Country rock
- Length: 53:58
- Label: Arista
- Producer: The Flying Burrito Brothers

The Flying Burrito Brothers chronology
California Jukebox (1997)	Sons of the Golden West (1999)	Georgia Peach (as Burrito Deluxe) (2002)

Professional ratings
Review scores
Source	Rating
Allmusic	2.5/5 stars

Sons of the Golden West is the 8th studio album by The Flying Burrito Brothers, released in 1999. This album, like California Jukebox before it, contains a mixture of original and covers and a variety of guest musicians. This was the first album to contain absolutely no contributions from the original lineup as "Sneaky" Pete Kleinow had stopped working with the group due to health concerns in 1997 (He appeared on Sunset Sundown despite having left the group by the time of its release).

The album was re-released in Australia in 2002 as Honky Tonkin' and contained variations in the track order. The track "Ode To Gram" was omitted and replaced with "Wheel of Love" from 1994's Eye of A Hurricane and "Willin' " from 1997's California Jukebox.

== Track listing ==
1. "Sons of the Golden West" (John Beland) 3:40
2. "Honky Tonkin' " (Mel Tillis) 4:31
3. "Area 51" (John Beland) 4:29
4. "Hungry Eyes" (Merle Haggard) 3:30 - feat. Merle Haggard
5. "Pioneer Zephyr Train" (John Beland) 4:05
6. "When I Was A Cowboy" (John Beland, Larry Patton) 4:34 - feat. The Oak Ridge Boys and David Roe]l
7. "Down at the Palomino" (John Beland) 4:31
8. "Genuine Healer" (Larry Patton, Ron Knuth) 2:44
9. "Pull This" (John Beland) 2:14
10. "Anyone Else But You" (John Beland) 2:56 - feat. Sam Bush
11. "Honky Tonk Blues" (Hank Williams) 6:08 feat. Delbert McClinton
12. "Up On Sycamore" (John Beland) 4:31
13. "Locked Away" (Keith Richards, Steve Jordan) 3:30
14. "Ode To Gram" (Larry Patton) 2:35

== Personnel ==
The Flying Burrito Brothers

- John Beland - guitar, harmonica, keyboards, mandolin, percussion, vocals, producer
- Wayne Bridge - pedal steel, Dobro
- Larry Patton - bass, vocals
- Gary Kubal - drums, percussion

Additional personnel

- Al Jones - engineer
- Lou Bradley - engineer
- Steve Lowery - engineer
- Paula Wolak - engineer
