= Georgia Peach (album) =

Studio album by Burrito Deluxe
- Released: December 3, 2002
- Studios: Camp David, Thousand Oaks, California; The Train, Nashville, Tennessee
- Genre: Country rock
- Length: 47:23
- Label: Lamon
- Producer: Tommy Spurlock

Burrito Deluxe chronology
Sons of the Golden West (1999)	Georgia Peach (2002)	The Whole Enchilada (2004)

Professional ratings
Review scores
Source	Rating
AllMusic	4/5 stars

Georgia Peach is the first release by Burrito Deluxe. After John Beland retired The Flying Burrito Brothers in 2000, original member of that band "Sneaky" Pete Kleinow put together a new lineup with Carlton Moody and Tommy Spurlock. As Beland still had rights to the name, the band decided to call itself Burrito Deluxe after the Flying Burrito Brothers' second album. In addition to a mixture of original tunes and covers, the album contains several redone version of Flying Burrito Brothers and other songs associated with Gram Parsons.

== Track listing ==
1. "Wheels" (Chris Hillman, Gram Parsons) 2:55
2. "Secret of Life" (Earl Bud Lee, Luke Powers, Tommy Spurlock) 3:28
3. "Cash on the Barrelhead" (Charlie Louvin, Ira Louvin) 2:45
4. "Hickory Wind" (Bob Buchanan, Gram Parsons) 4:25
5. "Bluest Brown Eyes" (Carlton Moody, Earl Bud Lee) 2:46
6. "She's Still the Queen" (Martin Cowart, Tommy Spurlock) 3:37
7. "Streets of Baltimore" (Harlan Howard, Tompall Glaser) 3:08
8. "Call It Love" (Billy Crain, Jim Messina, Richard Alan Lonow, Ronnie Guilbeau) 4:03
9. "Christine's Tune (A.K.A. Devil in Disguise)" (Chris Hillman, Gram Parsons) 3:06
10. "Old Memories" 2:44
11. "She Once Lived Here" (Autry Inman) 4:20
12. "Louisiana" (Gib Guilbeau, John Beland) 4:06
13. "Feels Like a Heartache to Me" (Gib Guilbeau, Ronnie Guilbeau) 2:36
14. "G.P." (Luke Powers, Tommy Spurlock) 3:24

== Personnel ==
Burrito Deluxe

- Tommy Spurlock - Dobro, guitar, lap steel guitar, mandolin, vocals
- Carlton Moody - guitar, vocals
- "Sneaky" Pete Kleinow - pedal steel
- Willie Watson - vocals
- Rick Lonow - drums

Additional personnel

- Garth Hudson - keyboards on "Hickory Wind"
- Voytek Kochanek - engineer
