= Flying Again =

Studio album by The Flying Burrito Brothers
- Released: October 1975
- Genre: Country rock
- Length: 32:08
- Label: Columbia
- Producer: Norbert Putnam, Glen Spreen

The Flying Burrito Brothers chronology
Close Up the Honky-Tonks (1974)	Flying Again (1975)	Airborne (1976)

Professional ratings
Review scores
Source	Rating
AllMusic	2/5 stars
Classic Rock	5/10 stars

Flying Again is the fourth studio album by the country rock group The Flying Burrito Brothers, released in 1975.

After Gram Parsons' death in 1973, posthumous interest in the Burrito Brothers' music grew. This interest caused the band's original label, A&M Records, to release the compilation album Close Up the Honky-Tonks in 1974. Since Rick Roberts had dissolved the Flying Burrito Brothers after a brief 1973 European tour with no original members, former manager Eddie Tickner started to think about the possibilities of reviving the band.

After Tickner received booking interest from a number of clubs, founding members "Sneaky" Pete Kleinow and Chris Ethridge agreed to re-form the Burritos. They hired former Byrds drummer Gene Parsons, guitarist Joel Scott Hill from Canned Heat, and fiddler Gib Guilbeau to round out the "refried" Burritos. Tickner then got the new band a deal with Columbia Records, of which Flying Again was their label debut.

Despite having two original members, the sound of this album is markedly different from the albums released by the original incarnation. Joel Scott Hill handled lead vocals on most of the tracks, with Gib Guilbeau on three and Gene Parsons on one. "Building Fires" was released as a single.

== Track listing ==
All lead vocals by Joel Scott Hill, except where noted.

Side 1
No.	Title	Writer(s)	Lead Vocals	Length
1.	"Easy to Get On"	Bob Brown, Hill		3:18
2.	"Wind and Rain"	Gene Parsons, Gib Guilbeau		4:28
3.	"Why Baby Why"	George Jones, Darrell Edwards	Guilbeau	2:24
4.	"Dim Lights, Thick Smoke (And Loud, Loud Music)"	Max Fidler, Joe Maphis, Rose Lee Maphis		2:16
5.	"You Left the Water Running"	Dan Penn, Oscar Frank, Rick Hall		2:23

Side 2
No.	Title	Writer(s)	Lead Vocals	Length
1.	"Building Fires""	Penn, Johnny Christopher, Jim Dickinson		4:18
2.	"Sweet Desert Childhood"	Parsons	Parsons	3:44
3.	"Bon Soir Blues"	Guilbeau, Thad Maxwell	Guilbeau	4:11
4.	"River Road"	Guilbeau	Guilbeau	2:59
5.	"Hot Burrito #3"	Chris Ethridge, Guilbeau, Hill, Pete Kleinow, Parsons		2:07

== Personnel ==
The Flying Burrito Brothers

- "Sneaky" Pete Kleinow - pedal steel guitar, string arrangements
- Chris Ethridge - bass
- Joel Scott Hill - vocals, guitar
- Gib Guilbeau - vocals, guitar, fiddle
- Gene Parsons - vocals, drums, tambourine, guitar, harmonica

with:

- Spooner Oldham - piano, organ
