= The Whole Enchilada =

Studio album by Burrito Deluxe
- Released: August 10, 2004
- Genre: Country rock
- Length: 48:19
- Label: Luna Chica
- Producers: Carlton Moody, Garth Hudson

Burrito Deluxe chronology
Burrito Deluxe (2002)	The Whole Enchilada (2004)	Disciples of the Truth (2007)

Professional ratings
Review scores
Source	Rating
AllMusic	3.5/5 stars
Uncut	1/5 stars

The Whole Enchilada is the second release by Burrito Deluxe. Following the release of their first album, Tommy Spurlock and Willie Watson departed and the band assembled a touring lineup that added Jeff "Stick" Davis on bass and Garth Hudson of The Band on keyboards.

== Track listing ==
1. "You Got Gold" 4:36
2. "The Letter" 2:51
3. "Woman Like You" 3:56
4. "Sister" 3:19
5. "Ezekial's Wheel" 2:33
6. "Zydeco Ball" 3:02
7. "Everywhere I Go" 3:18
8. "All I Had Left (Left With You)" 3:24
9. "Memphis Money" 3:44
10. "Way Back In The Mountains" 3:15
11. "Baton Rouge" 3:00
12. "The Last Letter home" 3:59
13. "Rex Bob Lowenstein" 7:22
14. "Good Night" 3:20

== Personnel ==
Burrito Deluxe

- Carlton Moody - guitar, mandolin, vocals
- "Sneaky" Pete Kleinow - pedal steel
- Garth Hudson - accordion, Hammond organ, piano, synthesizer
- Jeff "Stick" Davis - bass
- Rick Lonow - drums

Additional personnel

- Jason Lehning - engineer
