= Close Up the Honky Tonks =

Close Up the Honky-Tonks

Compilation album by The Flying Burrito Brothers
- Released: July 1974
- Genre: Country rock
- Label: A&M
- Producer: Various

The Flying Burrito Brothers chronology
| Last of the Red Hot Burritos (1971) | Close Up the Honky-Tonks (1974) | Flying Again (1975) |

Professional ratings
Review scores
| Source | Rating |
|---|---|
| AllMusic | 4.5/5 stars |
| Christgau's Record Guide | B− |
| Tom Hull | B |
| The Rolling Stone Album Guide | 3.5/5 stars |

Close Up the Honky-Tonks is a compilation double-LP by country rock band The Flying Burrito Brothers, which was released in 1974. By this time, the Flying Burrito Brothers no longer existed, having been dissolved by Rick Roberts in 1973.

This compilation was released after Gram Parsons' death in 1973, presumably to capitalize on posthumous interest in Parsons' music, though the compilation does include cuts from the Chris Hillman-led post-Parsons era as well (on Side Four). Some of these songs have yet to be released anywhere else.

== Track listing ==
=== Side One ===
1. "Hot Burrito #2"
2. "Do Right Woman"
3. "Wheels"
4. "Sin City"
5. "Christine's Tune"
6. "Hot Burrito #1"

(all tracks from The Gilded Palace of Sin; also available on Hot Burritos! The Flying Burrito Bros Anthology 1969–1972)

=== Side Two ===
1. "God's Own Singer"
2. "If You Gotta Go"
3. "High Fashion Queen"
4. "Cody, Cody"
5. "Wild Horses"
6. "The Train Song"

(tracks 1–5 from Burrito Deluxe, track 6 from non-LP single; also available on Hot Burritos! The Flying Burrito Bros Anthology 1969–1972)

=== Side Three ===
1. "Close Up the Honky-Tonks"
2. "Sing Me Back Home"
3. "Bony Moronie"
4. "To Love Somebody"
5. "Break My Mind"

(tracks 1–5 from Honky Tonk Heaven, Parsons-era tracks; 1, 2, 4 & 5 also available on Hot Burritos! The Flying Burrito Bros Anthology 1969–1972)

=== Side Four ===
1. "Beat the Heat"
2. "Did You See"
3. "Here Tonight"
4. "Money Honey"
5. "Roll Over Beethoven"
6. "Wake Up Little Susie"

(tracks 1–6: unreleased post-Parsons-era tracks)
