= Eye of a Hurricane (The Flying Burrito Brothers album) =

Studio album by The Flying Burrito Brothers
- Released: May 17, 1994
- Genre: Country rock
- Length: 50:04
- Label: Relix
- Producer: The Flying Burrito Brothers

The Flying Burrito Brothers chronology
Live from Europe (1993)	Eye of a Hurricane (1994)	California Jukebox (1997)

Professional ratings
Review scores
Source	Rating
AllMusic	2/5 stars

Eye of a Hurricane is the 6th studio album by The Flying Burrito Brothers, released in 1994. In the early 1990s, longtime Flying Burrito Brothers members John Beland, Gib Guilbeau, Sneaky Pete Kleinow and Chris Ethridge teamed up with Australian rock legend, Brian Cadd and former Elvis Presley drummer, Ronnie Tutt, to form a brand new version of Burritos. The sessions took place at Brian Cadd's studio in Franklin, Tennessee and the material was mostly written by Beland, Cadd and Guilbeau, with one song contributed by Ethridge. Beland and Cadd produced the album for Magnum Records, in London England. In support of the album, Beland, Cadd, Kleinow and Guilbeau toured Europe in the early 90s, playing clubs and concerts. Ethridge surprisingly vanished only days before the tour, leaving the band to quickly hire Nashville bassist Larry Gadler, as well as Bobby Bare's drummer Gary Kubal. The tour yielded a live album called Live in Europe, also on Magnum.

== Track listing ==
1. "Wheel of Love" (Beland, Cadd) – 4:13
2. "Like a Thief in the Night" (Beland, Cadd, Guilbeau) – 4:02
3. "Bayou Blues" (Guilbeau, Lindsey) – 3:44
4. "Angry Words" (Cadd) – 5:02
5. "Rosetto Knows" (Beland) – 2:52
6. "Heart Highway" (Beland, Cadd) – 3:45
7. "I Sent Your Saddle Home" (Guilbeau) – 3:41
8. "Juke Box Saturday Night" (Beland, Cadd) – 2:11
9. "Arizona Moon" (Beland, Cadd) – 3:26
10. "Wild Wild West" (Beland) – 3:39
11. "Eye of the Hurricane" (Beland, Cadd, Guilbeau) – 5:03
12. "Sunset Boulevard" (Beland, Guilbeau) – 4:37
13. "Smile" (Edwards, Ethridge) – 3:49

== Personnel ==
The Flying Burrito Brothers

- John Beland - guitar, mandolin, arranger, vocals, producer
- Brian Cadd - arranger, keyboards, vocals, producer, engineer
- Chris Ethridge - bass, vocals
- Gib Guilbeau - fiddle, vocals
- Sneaky Pete Kleinow - pedal steel
- Ron Tutt - drums

Additional personnel

- Dave Dillbeck - engineer
- Nigel Molden - executive producer
- Todd Robbins - engineer, mixing
