= Mickey McGee =

American drummer (born 1947)

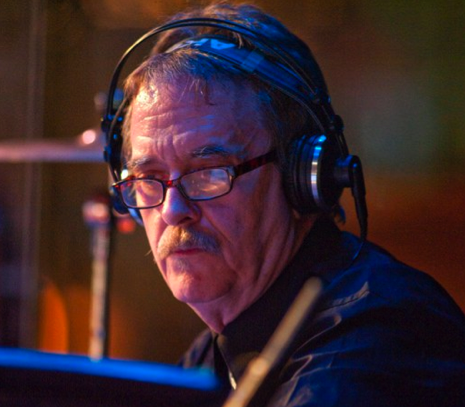

Background information
- Born: William Michael McGee; October 25, 1947
- Origin: New Orleans, Louisiana, United States
- Died: July 20, 2020 (aged 72)
- Occupation: Musician
- Instrument: Drum set
- Years active: 1960s-July 2020

William Michael "Mickey" McGee (born October 25, 1947, New Orleans, Louisiana, United States - died July 20, 2020) was an American drummer.

== Biography ==
McGee spent his formative years in and around Phoenix, Arizona. While touring with the band Goose Creek Symphony, McGee met Linda Ronstadt, who would later remember him and serve as a major catalyst for his career.

McGee found his way to Los Angeles in the early 1970s and made his presence known in the local country rock community where he again attracted the attention of Ronstadt and record producer John Boylan. Boylan hired McGee to play on Ronstadt's 1973 album, Don't Cry Now, which went gold two years later. After the release of Don't Cry Now, McGee toured with Ronstadt, which gave rise to new relationships with other notables such as Jackson Browne, for whom he played drums on For Everyman.

What followed was a long but intermittent gig with the Flying Burrito Brothers that spanned a period from 1975 to 1981. As McGee's recording experience grew, so did his reputation as an experienced road warrior, making him the likeliest of candidates to assume the role of key sideman for the debuting RCA group, Juice Newton & Silver Spur. He agreed to be their drummer on a series of tours to promote their 1975 album of the same name, and concurrently was able to maintain his commitment to the Flying Burrito Brothers. Another side of McGee would be uncovered after the 1975-1976 Juice Newton tour ended, which was that of a songwriter. Along with collaborator Doug Haywood, McGee penned "Blue," to be recorded on the second Juice Newton & Silver Spur album, After the Dust Settles, released in 1977. Two years later Juice Newton would record McGee's composition "I'll Never Love Again" for the album Well Kept Secret, which was Newton's first album as a solo artist. "I'll Never Love Again" has since been covered by many other artists, and was also performed on network television.

McGee has been signed four times. He was on Capitol Records with Goose Creek Symphony, Cotillion Records with Warren S. Richardson Jr., Curb Records with the Burrito Brothers Band and Infinity Records with Blue Steel. He has recorded for Linda Ronstadt, Maureen McGovern, Chris Darrow, Jackson Browne, Keith Moon, Michael Dinner, Juice Newton, Rick Nelson, and JD Souther.

McGee has toured with Bobbie Gentry, Linda Ronstadt, Ricky Nelson, Billy Joel, Juice Newton, Jackson Browne, JD Souther, Warren Zevon, and Chris Darrow. He has recorded under producers Peter Asher, Bruce Botnick, Mal Evans, John Boylan, Jimmie Haskell, Felix Pappalardi, Jerry Goldstein, and Jack Nietsche.

He died of complications from COVID-19 on July 20, 2020.

== Selected discography ==
- Artist Proof - Chris Darrow (1972)
- John David Souther - JD Souther (1972)
- Don't Cry Now - Linda Ronstadt (1973)
- For Everyman - Jackson Browne (1973)
- Two Sides of the Moon - Keith Moon (1975)
- After the Dust Settles - Juice Newton (1977)
- Terence Boylan - Terence Boylan (1977)
- Well Kept Secret - Juice Newton (1978)
- Playing to Win - Rick Nelson (1981)
- Hearts on the Line - The Flying Burrito Brothers (1981)
- Hollywood Nights 1979-82 - The Flying Burrito Brothers (1990)
- The Legend & the Legacy - Sneaky Pete Kleinow (1994)
