= The Gilded Palace of Sin =

Studio album by the Flying Burrito Brothers
- Released: February 6, 1969
- Recorded: November–December 1968
- Studios: A&M, Hollywood
- Genre: Country rock
- Length: 37:24
- Label: A&M
- Producers: The Flying Burrito Brothers; Henry Lewy; Larry Marks

The Flying Burrito Brothers chronology
The Gilded Palace of Sin (1969)	Burrito Deluxe (1970)

The Gilded Palace of Sin is the debut studio album by American country rock band The Flying Burrito Brothers, released on February 6, 1969, by A&M Records. It continued Gram Parsons' and Chris Hillman's work in modern country music, fusing traditional styles such as folk and country with other forms of popular music including gospel, soul, and psychedelic rock.

Although it was not a commercial success, peaking at number 164 on the Billboard 200 Top LP's chart, The Gilded Palace of Sin has been widely regarded as an important album in the development of 1970s rock. It was included in Robert Christgau's "Basic Record Library" of 1950s and 1960s recordings, published in Christgau's Record Guide: Rock Albums of the Seventies (1981). It was ranked number 192 in Rolling Stone magazine's 2012 list of the "500 Greatest Albums of All Time", moved down to number 462 in the 2020 edition. It maintained the same placement in the 2023 small revision.

== Background ==
We went down to Melrose Avenue to see the Flying Burritos. [...] There were odd things going around town. There were rumors. There were stories. Everything was unmentionable but nothing was unimaginable. This mystical flirtation with the idea of "sin"—this sense that it was possible to go "too far," and that many people were doing it—was very much with us in Los Angeles in 1968 and 1969. A demented and seductive vortical tension was building in the community. The jitters were setting in. I recall a time when the dogs barked every night and the moon was always full.

— Joan Didion, The White Album (1979)

After spearheading the Byrds' foray into country music with the influential Sweetheart of the Rodeo album, Gram Parsons fell out with the band when he refused to accompany them on a tour of South Africa in 1968. Two months later bassist Chris Hillman left the Byrds as well and joined Parsons to form the Flying Burrito Brothers. As stated in the documentary Beyond Nashville, "Gram Parsons was passionate about country music's simple poetry. He was equally passionate about rock music. At a time when they were poles apart, he alone thought they belonged together."

== Recording and composition ==
The Gilded Palace of Sin was recorded at A&M Studios in Hollywood and produced by Larry Marks with Henry Lewy engineering. The sessions featured a variety of drummers. With harmonies that reveal the influences of the Everly Brothers and the Louvin Brothers, the songs on the Burritos' debut attempt to marry country music with the soul sound associated with Otis Redding and the Stax-Volt label, and singers such as Percy Sledge.

Another significant characteristic of the album is "Sneaky" Pete Kleinow's unorthodox steel guitar playing, which provides an almost continuous commentary throughout some of the songs. As guitarist Bernie Leadon (who wasn't a member of the band yet when this LP was recorded and released) explains to Meyer in Twenty Thousand Roads, "Sneaky uniquely played an eight-string Fender cable pull steel tuned to B6 instead of the more common C6. He played [a] usually more jazz or swing tuning in a style that most other players use an E9 tuning for. His rationale was: B is the 'five chord,' or dominant chord, to the key of E. This resulted in absolutely-to-Pete steel licks. And no one else thinks like him anyway." Kleinow also utilized a fuzzbox and played the instrument through a rotating Hammond Leslie amplifier, adding a psychedelic touch to several songs.

Most of the songs were written by Parsons and Hillman at a house in the San Fernando Valley dubbed "Burrito Manor." "Sin City", co-written by Hillman and Parsons and called a "loping lament" and a "cautionary dirge", mentions The Byrds's manager Larry Spector ("a gold plated door") and Robert F. Kennedy ("tried to clean up this town"). It may have been influenced by The Louvin Brothers. In the 2004 documentary Gram Parsons: Fallen Angel, Hillman recalls writing the song with Parsons: "Gram was sleeping. I woke up and had this idea, 'This old town's filled with sin, it'll swallow you in.' I got the first verse and most of the chorus and then I said, 'Gram, get up! I got somethin' here.' And he got up and we wrote that song in about thirty minutes. It actually wrote itself." In the same documentary bassist Chris Etheridge adds, "I told Gram I had a couple of old melodies from back when I was growin' up...I played 'em for him and we wrote the two songs that day, the "Hot Burrito #1" and the "Hot Burrito #2," and then that night went into the studio and cut 'em." "My Uncle" and "Hippie Boy" address then-contemporary countercultural concerns: the draft and the 1968 Democratic National Convention riots. Parsons later explained to Fusion magazine, "We kept saying we got to do a song called 'Hippie Boy' about Chicago, and it's got to be a narrative song, and Chris Hillman has to do it...It was the toughest challenge on the album." The two R&B standards covered on the album, "Dark End of the Street" and "Do Right Woman", are examples of a country-soul fusion that Parsons would often refer to as "cosmic American music."

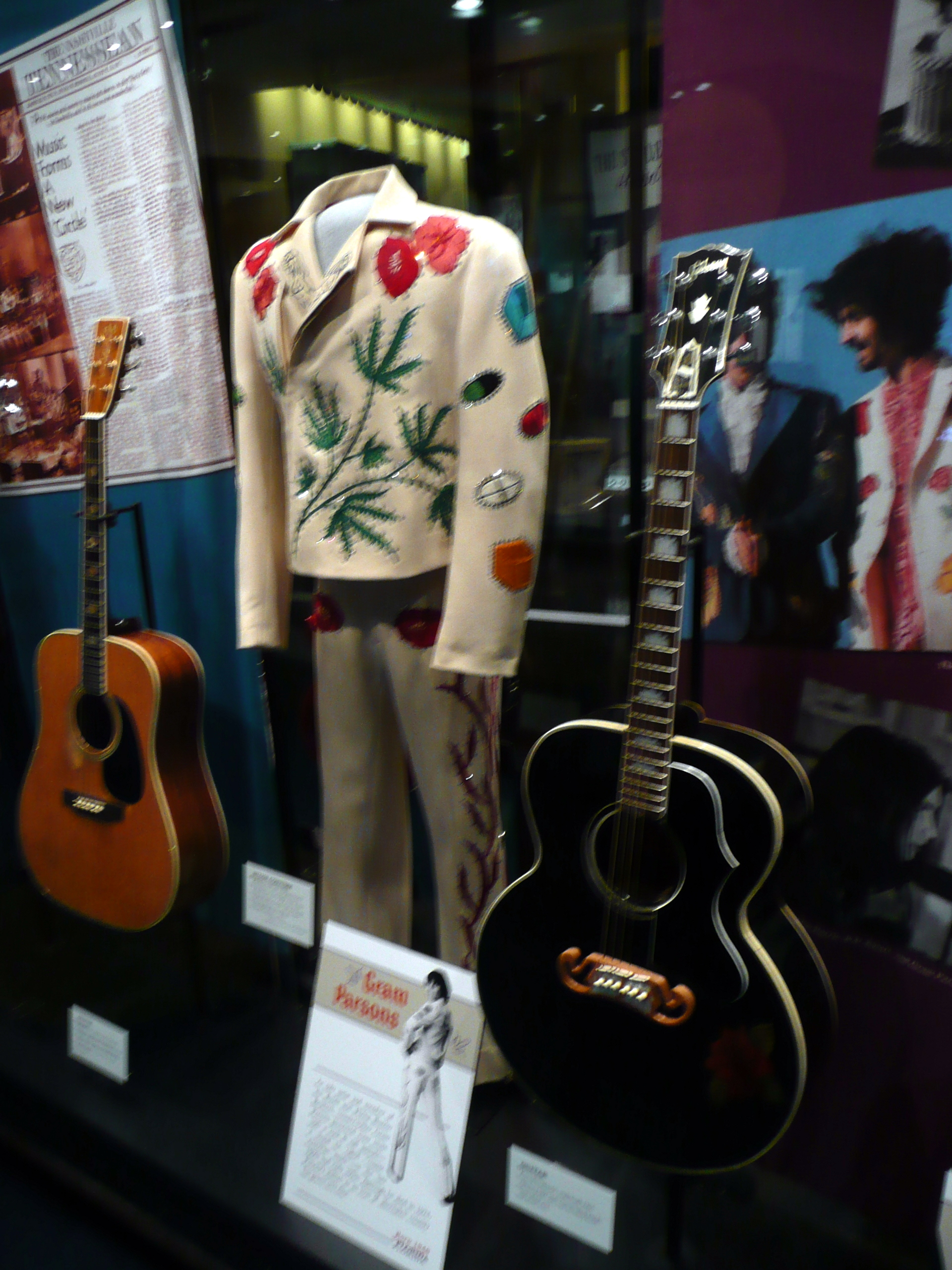
The Nudie suit of Parsons in the Country Music Hall of Fame in Nashville

== Album artwork ==
The album cover features the band in Nudie suits. Parsons had taken the band to designer Nudie Cohn to have custom sequin suits made for all the band members especially for the photo shoot, but Parsons' was most unusual, featuring a naked woman (rendered as an old-school sailor's tattoo on each lapel), red poppies on the shoulders, deep-green marijuana leaves on the front, and embroidered Seconal and Tuinal pills scattered elsewhere. Parsons asked that a flaming red cross surrounded by radiating shafts of blue and gold light cover the back of the jacket. The suit now hangs in the Country Music Hall of Fame. Tom Wilkes, who was the head of the art department at A&M at the time, explained to director Gandulf Hennig in 2004, "We decided to take them out to the desert and do something kind of surreal with the Nudie suits. And they looked great anyway. They looked funky and kind of country western and kind of rock. I felt that look was great. They didn't really need the Nudie suits." The album cover was shot by Barry Feinstein.

== Reception ==
Professional ratings
Review scores
Source	Rating
AllMusic	5/5 stars
The Encyclopedia of Popular Music	5/5 stars
Pitchfork	9.0/10
Rolling Stone	positive

At the time of its release, John Firminger wrote in Country Music Review that the album "quite clearly stands as a complete definition of the term country rock, using a heavy instrumental approach combining strong country roots." Allan Jones, writing in the influential British rock weekly NME, raved, "Let me discourse on the sheer magnificence contained within the micro-grooves of Gilded Palace of Sin." In the original Rolling Stone review of the album, Stanley Booth called it "one of the best records of the year" and the best, most personal music Parsons had ever done. When Rolling Stone asked Bob Dylan to name his favorite country-rock album, he answered, "The Flying Burrito Brothers. Boy, I love them. Their record instantly knocked me out." The album has since become regarded as one of the most groundbreaking of the 1960s. Rolling Stone included it on its list of "The 100 Best Debut Albums of All Time", writing that "in many ways, Gilded Palace picks up where the Byrds' Sweetheart of the Rodeo left off...Together, the mercurial Parsons and the levelheaded Hillman concocted a crazily coherent statement of irony-fueled hillbilly anthems, inventive covers and achingly beautiful two-part harmonies, all underscored by Sneaky Pete Kleinow's radical pedal-steel guitar." In a 5 star review, AllMusic's Mark Deming raved, "...no one ever brought rock and country together quite like the Flying Burrito Brothers, and this album remains their greatest accomplishment." In his article "The Lost Boy", John Harris of Mojo writes that the album "remains an absolute delight, founded on the poetry that came from the juxtaposition of country music's air of sincere honesty with songs that drew much of their inspiration from the synthetic expanse of Los Angeles."

== Influence ==
Like Sweetheart of the Rodeo, The Gilded Palace of Sin was not a commercial success. To date, the RIAA has not certified it gold. However, its impact on popular music has grown over the years, influencing, for example, the Eagles. During the 1980s, the New Traditionalist movement in mainstream country music was influenced by The Gilded Palace of Sin, with artists such as Travis Tritt, Vince Gill, Alan Jackson, Clint Black and Randy Travis. Today, The Gilded Palace of Sin continues to influence the alternative country movement, often referred to as "alt-country." Bands like Uncle Tupelo, Wilco, Son Volt, Whiskeytown, and the Jayhawks, as well as such musicians as Dwight Yoakam, Lucinda Williams, Emmylou Harris (Parsons' one-time singing partner), and Steve Earle all have recorded music that bears traces of The Gilded Palace of Sin. Non-country artists like Elvis Costello have cited the album as a particular favorite, with Costello covering several cuts during his career; similarly, Dinosaur Jr. covered the song "Hot Burrito #2" on its album Green Mind. In the liner notes for the 1997 reissue, Sid Griffin wrote that while Gilded Palace only sold 50,000 copies, "...like the first album by the Velvet Underground, it would seem everyone of those 50,000 went out and formed a band inspired by what they'd heard."

For years, the album was never reissued in its entirety on compact disc in the United States. However, in 2000 the complete album was reissued as part of a two-disc set, Hot Burritos! The Flying Burrito Brothers Anthology 1969–1972. In 2002, a new mastering was issued on a single-disc release Sin City: The Very Best of the Flying Burrito Brothers, which packaged The Gilded Palace of Sin with its successor, Burrito Deluxe, as well as a few outtakes from the same period.

In 2003, the album was ranked number 192 on the Rolling Stone list of the 500 greatest albums of all time, maintaining the rating in a 2012 revised list and dropping to 461 on the 2020/2023 revision. In 2013, the album was ranked number 99 on Rolling Stone's list of "The 100 Best Debut Albums of All Time". The album was included in the 2014 Rolling Stone list of the "50 Rock Albums Every Country Fan Should Own". It was ranked number 620 in Colin Larkin's All Time Top 1000 Albums, 3rd Edition (2000).

== Reissues ==
In early 2017, independent record label Intervention Records released a 180-gram vinyl reissue of The Gilded Palace of Sin. The reissue was remastered by Kevin Gray, using a 1/2" safety copy of the original master tapes and includes an "old-style" jacket featuring the original album artwork printed by Stoughton Printing. In late 2017, it was reissued on hybrid SACD by Intervention Records. A standard reissue of the album on vinyl was released worldwide on January 29, 2021, by Universal Music Enterprises.

== Track listing ==
All lead vocals by Gram Parsons and Chris Hillman, except where noted.

Side one
No.	Title	Writer(s)	Length
1.	"Christine's Tune"	Parsons, Hillman	3:04
2.	"Sin City"	Parsons, Hillman	4:11
3.	"Do Right Woman"	Chips Moman, Dan Penn	3:56
4.	"Dark End of the Street"	Moman, Penn	3:58
5.	"My Uncle"	Parsons, Hillman	2:37

Side two
No.	Title	Writer(s)	Lead Vocals	Length
1.	"Wheels"	Hillman, Parsons		3:04
2.	"Juanita"	Hillman, Parsons		2:31
3.	"Hot Burrito #1"	Chris Ethridge, Parsons	Parsons	3:40
4.	"Hot Burrito #2"	Ethridge, Parsons	Parsons	3:19
5.	"Do You Know How It Feels"	Parsons, Barry Goldberg		2:09
6.	"Hippie Boy"	Hillman, Parsons	Hillman	4:55

== Personnel ==
The Flying Burrito Brothers

- Gram Parsons – vocals, rhythm guitar, keyboards
- Chris Hillman – rhythm guitar, vocals, mandolin (5)
- "Sneaky" Pete Kleinow (misspelled "Sneeky" on the back cover) – pedal steel guitar
- Chris Ethridge – bass guitar, piano (8, 9), backing vocals (9)

with:

- Jon Corneal – drums (tracks 1, 3–5, 7)
- Thomas "Popeye" Phillips – drums (tracks 8, 9, 11)
- Eddie Hoh – drums (tracks 2, 10)
- Sam Goldstein – drums (track 6)
- David Crosby – backing vocals (track 3)
- Hot Burrito Chorus – backing vocals (track 11)

Technical

- The Flying Burrito Brothers, Larry Marks, Henry Lewy – production
- Henry Lewy – engineer
- Tom Wilkes – art direction
- Barry Feinstein – cover photography
