= California Jukebox =

Studio album by The Flying Burrito Brothers
- Released: July 8, 1997
- Genre: Country rock
- Length: 51:27
- Label: Icehouse
- Producer: The Flying Burrito Brothers

The Flying Burrito Brothers chronology
Eye of a Hurricane (1993)	California Jukebox (1997)	Sons of the Golden West (1999)

Professional ratings
Review scores
Source	Rating
Allmusic	2.5/5 stars

California Jukebox is the 7th studio album by The Flying Burrito Brothers, released in 1997. The album is a fair mix between original and cover songs. The cover songs are an interesting mix between older and more established acts such as Neil Young and Buck Owens as well as newer alt-country acts such as Son Volt and The Jayhawks. The album also features guest appearances by Waylon Jennings, Charlie Louvin and former band members such as Brian Cadd and Al Perkins.

== Track listing ==
1. "San Fernando Road" (John Beland) 5:38
2. "Windfall" (Jay Farrar) 3:06
3. "Sweet Susannah" (Gib Guilbeau) 2:03
4. "Back to Bayou Teche" (Sonny Landreth) 4:03
5. "California Jukebox" (John Beland) 3:23
6. "Buckaroo" (Bob Morris) 2:26
7. "Tomorrow We'll Do It Again" (Ron Knuth) 3:25
8. "World Without You" (John Beland) 3:30
9. "Dance, Dance, Dance" (Neil Young) 2:16
10. "Willin' " (Lowell George) 3:35
11. "Two Hearts" (Gary Louris, Mark Olson) 4:01
12. "I Ain't Livin Long Like This" (Rodney Crowell) 4:28
13. "Take A Walk On The Edge" (Brian Cadd, John Beland) 4:24
14. "My Baby's Gone" (Hazel Houser) 3:32
15. "CJB Revisited" (John Beland) 0:53

== Personnel ==
The Flying Burrito Brothers

- John Beland - Guitar, Mandolin, Arranger, Vocals, Producer
- Gib Guilbeau - Fiddle, Vocals
- Sneaky Pete Kleinow - Pedal Steel
- Larry Patton - Bass, Vocals
- Gary Kubal - Drums

Additional personnel

- Waylon Jennings - Vocals on "I Ain't Living Long Like This"
- John Gold - Engineer
- Nathan Smith - Engineer
- Todd Robbins - Engineer, Mixing
