= The Flying Burrito Bros (album) =

Studio album by the Flying Burrito Brothers
- Released: June 1971
- Recorded: 1971
- Studio: Sunset Sound, Los Angeles, California
- Genre: Country rock
- Length: 36:15
- Label: A&M
- Producer: Jim Dickson, Bob Hughes

The Flying Burrito Brothers chronology
Burrito Deluxe (1970)	The Flying Burrito Bros (1971)	Last of the Red Hot Burritos (1972)

Professional ratings
Review scores
Source	Rating
AllMusic	3/5 stars
Christgau's Record Guide	C+

The Flying Burrito Bros is the third album by the country rock group the Flying Burrito Brothers, released in the spring of 1971. Before recording sessions for the album began, Chris Hillman fired Gram Parsons from the band, leaving Hillman and "Sneaky" Pete Kleinow as the only original continuing members. In Parsons's place, the band hired a young unknown musician named Rick Roberts, who later was the primary lead singer of Firefall. Guitarist Bernie Leadon would also leave the band shortly after the album's release, going on to co-found the Eagles.

Over the winter of 1970 to 1971, the band returned to Sunset Studios to record their third album. With Jim Dickson again the producer, assisted by Bob Hughes, the group developed original pieces mainly from Chris Hillman and Rick Roberts, along with a revisitation of a Bob Dylan composition. Several outtakes from the recording sessions later appeared on several compilations following the band's demise. Following the release of the album, further personnel changes occurred including Kleinow departing to focus solely on session recordings.

== Chart performance ==
The album debuted on Billboard magazine's Top LP's chart in the issue dated June 12, 1971, peaking at No. 176 during a nine-week run on the chart.

== Track listing ==
1. "White Line Fever" (Merle Haggard) – 3:16
2. "Colorado" (Rick Roberts) – 4:52
3. "Hand to Mouth" (Rick Roberts, Chris Hillman) – 3:44
4. "Tried So Hard" (Gene Clark) – 3:08
5. "Just Can't Be" (Rick Roberts, Chris Hillman) – 4:58
6. "To Ramona" (Bob Dylan) – 3:40
7. "Four Days of Rain" (Rick Roberts) – 3:39
8. "Can't You Hear Me Calling" (Rick Roberts, Chris Hillman) – 2:23
9. "All Alone" (Rick Roberts, Chris Hillman) – 3:33
10. "Why Are You Crying" (Rick Roberts) – 3:02

CD Bonus Tracks:

1. "Tried So Hard" (single version) (Gene Clark)
2. "Here Tonight" (Gene Clark)
3. "Payday" (Jesse Winchester)
4. "In My Own Small Way" (Rick Roberts)
5. "Feel Good Music" (Rick Roberts)
6. "Beat The Heat" (instrumental) (Pete Kleinow)
7. "Did You See" (Rick Roberts)
8. "Pick Me Up On Your Way Down" (Harlan Howard)

== Personnel ==
The Flying Burrito Brothers

- Rick Roberts - vocals, rhythm guitar
- Chris Hillman - vocals, bass
- Sneaky Pete Kleinow - pedal steel guitar
- Bernie Leadon - vocals, lead electric and acoustic guitars, banjo
- Michael Clarke - drums

Additional musicians

- Earl P. Ball - piano on "White Line Fever" and "Hand To Mouth"
- Bob Gibson - 12-string acoustic guitar on "Hand To Mouth"
- Mike Deasy - guitar on "To Ramona"

Production

- Producer: Jim Dickson/Bob Hughes
- Recording Engineer: Lillian Davis Douma / Bob Hughes
- Art Direction: Roland Young
- Photography: Jim McCrary
- Design: Chuck Beeson
