= Disciples of the Truth =

Studio album by Burrito Deluxe
- Released: March 30, 2007
- Genre: Country rock
- Label: Luna Chica Records
- Producer: Greg Archilla/Burrito Deluxe

Burrito Deluxe chronology
The Whole Enchilada (2004)	Disciples of the Truth (2007)	Sound As Ever (As The Burritos) (2011)

Professional ratings
Review scores
Source	Rating
Allmusic	3.5/5 stars

Disciples of the Truth is the third album released by Burrito Deluxe, issued in 2007.

== Track listing ==
1. "Out of the Wilderness" 4:24
2. "Sun Will Rise" 4:17
3. "Front Row Seats to Heaven" 3:19
4. "Disciples of the Truth" 3:57
5. "Wichita" 3:55
6. "On a Roll" 3:37
7. "When the Summer's Over" 4:43
8. "Encino" 3:31
9. "When It Comes Down on You" 4:12
10. "Wrong Side of Town" 4:12
11. "Midnight at a Red Light" 4:00
12. "Who's Gonna Love You" 5:57

== Personnel ==
Burrito Deluxe

- Carlton Moody - banjo, guitar, mandolin, vocals
- Walter Egan - guitar, vocals
- Richard Bell - B-3 organ, Mellotron, synthesizer, Wurlitzer, Clavinet, acoustic piano, accordion
- Jeff "Stick" Davis - bass
- Bryan Owings - drums

Additional Personnel

- Sneaky Pete Kleinow - pedal steel guitar
- Cindy Cashdollar, Mike Daly, Al Perkins - pedal steel, dobro
- Daniel Dugmore - pedal steel, banjo
- Barry "Byrd" Burton, Richard Ferreira - guitars
- Craig Krampf, Rick Lonow - percussion
- Joy Lynn White, Rick Schell, Blue Miller - backing vocals
