= Sunset Sundown =

Studio album by the Burrito Brothers
- Released: January 1982
- Genres: Country rock, country pop
- Label: Curb
- Producer: Michael Lloyd

The Burrito Brothers chronology
Hearts on the Line (1981)	Sunset Sundown (1982)	Cabin Fever (1985)

Sunset Sundown is an album by the country rock group the Burrito Brothers, released in 1982. It was produced by Michael Lloyd.

After Skip Battin left the band, the remaining three members of the Burrito Brothers carried on hoping to keep their commercial success going. The three singles released from this album, "If Something Should Come Between Us (Let It Be Love)", "Closer to You" and "I'm Drinkin' Canada Dry", all made the US country top 40. After the recording of Sunset Sundown, sole founding member "Sneaky" Pete Kleinow left the band, leaving the Burrito Brothers as a duo of John Beland and Gib Guilbeau.

In 1983, the pair released a few more hit singles and recorded one more album for Curb Records, A Taste of the Country. While the album remains unreleased, "Blue and Broken-Hearted Me" and "Could You Love Me One More Time" brought more chart success for the duo. In 1984, after leaving Curb Records, the duo recorded a double LP for Paradise Records entitled A New Shade of Blue featuring background vocals by the Jordanaires. Paradise Records folded before the album could be released; however a 13-track version of it was released in Europe in 1995 as Double Barrel. After the sessions for the album, Beland and Guilbeau went their separate ways, bringing the Flying Burrito Brothers to an end again, albeit temporarily.

== Critical reception ==
Professional ratings
Review scores
Source	Rating
The Encyclopedia of Popular Music	2/5 stars

The Globe and Mail wrote: "Numbers such as the draggy 'Louisiana', the Kenny Rogers-styled 'How'd We Ever Get This Way' or the bayin'-at-the-moon 'What's One More Time' would make perfect elevator music for a 26-story dude ranch." The Daily Oklahoman opined that "this sorry collection of middle-of-the-road, AM-radio country music bears no resemblance to the band of yore."

== Track listing ==
All tracks composed and arranged by John Beland and Gib Guilbeau; except where indicated

1. "If Something Should Come Between Us (Let It Be Love)"
2. "Louisiana"
3. "I'm Drinkin' Canada Dry" (Johnny Cymbal, Austin Roberts)
4. "When You're Giving Yourself to a Stranger"
5. "What's One More Time" (Richard Leigh)
6. "Run to the Night"
7. "How'd We Ever Get This Way"
8. "Coast to Coast" (John Beland)
9. "Closer to You"
10. "Save the Wild Life" (Curly Putman, Dave Kirby)

== Personnel ==
The Burrito Brothers

- John Beland – vocals, guitar, dobro
- "Sneaky" Pete Kleinow – pedal steel guitar
- Gib Guilbeau – guitar, fiddle

with:

- Ron Krasinski – drums
- Alan Estes – percussion
- John Hobbs – keyboards
- Dennis Belfield – bass
- Larry McNeely – banjo
- Tom Scott – saxophone
- Billy Thomas, Lynn Nilles – vocal harmony
