= Hearts on the Line =

Studio album by The Burrito Brothers
- Released: January 1981
- Genre: Country rock, urban cowboy
- Label: Curb
- Producer: Michael Lloyd

The Burrito Brothers chronology
| Live from Tokyo (1979) | Hearts on the Line (1981) | Sunset Sundown (1982) |

Professional ratings
Review scores
| Source | Rating |
|---|---|
| Allmusic | 1.5/5 stars |

Hearts on the Line is an album by the country rock group The Burrito Brothers, released in 1981.

After the Flying Burrito Brothers scored a minor country hit in 1979 with a live cover of Merle Haggard's "White Line Fever", the band was dropped from their record contract and hit yet again with personnel changes. By 1980, Greg Harris and Ed Ponder had left the group, leaving the Burritos as a trio of "Sneaky" Pete Kleinow, Gib Guilbeau and Skip Battin. In addition to commitments with the Flying Burrito Brothers, Guilbeau was also working as a songwriter for Criterion Music with John Beland, who Guilbeau knew from his time in the band Swampwater. Guilbeau and Beland wrote some songs and ultimately, Beland was invited to join the Burritos. Beland was reluctant to join the now nearly defunct band, as he was riding strong as lead guitarist with Ricky Nelson who (with Beland's help) was enjoying his own comeback of sorts.

However, after leaving Nelson in the hopes of producing the Burritos, Beland took the Burritos in a more commercial direction, having already written a number of country hits for other artists prior to his joining the FBB. In addition, the band's name at this time was shortened to simply The Burrito Brothers, a suggestion made by Curb Records.

Beland's song demos, which featured the Burritos on them, eventually made it to Dick Whitehouse at Curb records, who signed the band to a deal with Curb / Epic Records. By December 1980, the band's first single for Curb, "She's a Friend of a Friend" reached the US country top 70. Hearts on the Line followed in January 1981 and spawned two further singles, both of which made the US country top 20, "Does She Wish She Was Single Again?" and "She Belongs to Everyone But Me". More would follow.

That year, The Burrito Brothers received the number one "Crossover from pop to country" award from Billboard Magazine as well as best new vocal group award from Record World Magazine. But Skip Battin was fired from the band after the photo shoot for the album cover of Hearts on the Line, and was replaced in the studio by Dennis Belfield on bass. Mickey McGee was also replaced on drums by Ron Krasinsky, for the recordings. The success of the Burrito Brothers marked the first time in the band's 11-year history of having any serious chart success. During their span as a country hit act, they scored nine hits for Curb Records. Despite this success, the album is currently unavailable.

== Track listing ==
1. "That's When You Know It's Over" (John Beland, Gib Guilbeau)
2. "She's a Friend of a Friend" (John Beland, Gib Guilbeau)
3. "Isn't That Just Like Love" (Richard Leigh)
4. "She Belongs to Everyone But Me" (John Beland, Gib Guilbeau)
5. "Why Must the Ending Always Be So Sad" (John Beland)
6. "Family Tree" (Frank Dycus, Max Barnes)
7. "Damned If I'll Be Lonely Tonight" (John Beland, Gib Guilbeau, Mickey McGee)
8. "Does She Wish She Was Single Again?" (Richard Leigh, Milton Blackford)
9. "Too Much Honky Tonkin'" (John Beland, Gib Guilbeau)
10. "Oh Lonesome Me" (Don Gibson)

== Personnel ==
The Burrito Brothers

- John Beland - vocals, guitar, dobro
- "Sneaky" Pete Kleinow - pedal steel guitar
- Gib Guilbeau - guitar, fiddle

with:

- Ron Krazinsky - drums
- Dennis Belfield - bass
- Billy Thomas - additional harmonies
- Michael Lloyd - producer
- Chad Stuart - strings

recorded in Beverly Hills, California
