= Burrito Deluxe =

Studio album by the Flying Burrito Brothers
- Released: April 1970
- Studio: A&M (Hollywood)
- Genre: Country rock
- Length: 33:08
- Label: A&M
- Producer: Jim Dickson, Henry Lewy

The Flying Burrito Brothers chronology
The Gilded Palace of Sin (1969)	Burrito Deluxe (1970)	The Flying Burrito Bros (1971)

Burrito Deluxe is the second album by the country rock group the Flying Burrito Brothers, released in May 1970 on A&M Records, catalogue 4258. It is the last to feature Gram Parsons prior to his dismissal from the group. It contains the first issued version of the Mick Jagger/Keith Richards-written song "Wild Horses", released almost a year before the Rolling Stones' own take on it appeared on Sticky Fingers.

== Background ==
After the release of the group's debut album, ex-Byrd Michael Clarke was hired as the band's full-time drummer. He had recently been playing in a band, Dillard and Clark, along with another ex-Byrd, Gene Clark. In the fall of 1969 bassist Chris Ethridge left the Burrito Brothers in frustration at the band's lack of success. In his place the Burritos recruited guitarist Bernie Leadon from the disintegrating Dillard and Clark, freeing Chris Hillman to return to playing bass. The new Burritos lineup for this their second album was thus Parsons, Hillman, Pete Kleinow, Leadon and Clarke.

Unfortunately, no one had many new songs to contribute, with Leadon explaining to Parsons biographer David Meyer in 2007, "We started getting together – Gram, Chris, and I – at the A&M lot and trying to write songs. We spent three or four months doing this. It was like pulling teeth. We knew the mechanics of writing music, but the stuff that we did were not Gram's best songs." Hillman concurred to Meyer, "After the brief initial burst Gram and I couldn't seem to hook up again. Burrito Deluxe was recorded without any of the feeling and the intensity of the first album."

== Recording and composition ==
The LP is perhaps best remembered for containing the first recording of "Wild Horses." Parsons, who first met Rolling Stones songwriter and guitarist Keith Richards in 1968, had developed a close friendship with Richards during 1969. Richards gave Parsons a demo tape of "Wild Horses" on December 7, 1969, the day after the concert at Altamont, apparently in an effort to console Parsons after an alleged miscommunication with Michelle Phillips. In the 2004 documentary Gram Parsons: Fallen Angel, Pamela Des Barres states that, "Gram was so proud of the Stones giving him that song to do...'cause that was unusual; the Stones didn't just give songs to people." "Lazy Days" had been recorded by Parsons' previous groups, the International Submarine Band and the Byrds, but neither version was released, although the Byrds' version did eventually surface on the 1990 box set. Burrito Deluxe features a couple of cover songs, including the Conway Twitty country hit "Image of Me,” a supercharged version of the Bob Dylan-penned "If You Gotta Go," and the gospel standard "Farther Along.”

Parsons began to lose interest in the Burritos and, after missing too many gigs or showing up too inebriated to play, he was fired from the band in June 1970. In the Fallen Angel documentary, Chris Hillman cites Parsons’ lack of ambition and his growing infatuation with the Rolling Stones as the main reasons for the album's failure: "Gram was starting to wear some pretty interesting stuff on stage. He'd have a scarf and he'd have one of his girlfriend's shirts on, and I used to say, 'This guy is tryin' to look like a cross between Dottie West and Mick Jagger'...Towards his last days in the Burritos, he would be going to our gigs in a limousine – I mean, these were $500 a night shows – and we'd be piling into a separate car with our gear and Gram would show up in a limousine. Gram came from a very wealthy family and had this ongoing trust fund, which was about $55,000 a year, and it's sort of like he had been seduced by all that without quite earning it yet." Parsons later blamed the album's shortcomings on producer Jim Dickson; in the 2007 book, ‘’Twenty Thousand Roads’’ biographer David Meyer quotes Parsons: "The second album was a mistake – it was a mistake to get Jim Dickson involved. We should have been more careful than that." Parsons is also quoted expressing his dissatisfaction with steel guitarist "Sneaky" Pete Kleinow: "Chris (Hillman) knew all along that Sneaky wasn't the right steel player. Chris digs Sneaky more than I do 'cause he likes that dut dut dut dut that Sneaky could pull off. I wanted a Tom Brumley. Then I'd settle for anybody that played slide guitar with pedals on it. I wanted a brilliant-sounding, good, fast, pedal steel player."

== Reception ==
Professional ratings
Review scores
Source	Rating
AllMusic	4.5/5 stars
Select	2/5 medals
The Village Voice	B+

Burrito Deluxe was a commercial disappointment, failing to crack the Billboard 200. It was also a critical disappointment at the time, unlike the band's lauded debut LP, with Mark Deming of AllMusic opining, "... while it is hardly a bad album, it's not nearly as striking as The Gilded Palace of Sin. Parsons didn't deliver many noteworthy originals for this set, with 'Cody, Cody' and 'Older Guys' faring best but paling next to the highlights from the previous album." In the Parsons article, "The Lost Boy," Mojo writer John Harris observes that the album "mislaid just about all of the charm that had accompanied their debut, though it contained a handful of decent songs: 'Older Guys,' 'Cody Cody,' and 'High Fashion Queen.'" It has since been reappraised positively in retrospect by critics; In the liner notes to the 1997 reissue that paired it with the Burritos's debut, Sid Griffin writes of Burrito Deluxe, "Out went the R&B torch ballads, in came rock and roll...Burrito Deluxe is nonetheless required listening in Introducing To Country-Rock 101 at university."

In his 2020 memoir, Time Between: My Life as a Byrd, Burrito, and Beyond, Chris Hillman wrote: "There's really not much I can say about that record except that it was flat-out bad. They say you can't judge a book by its cover, but that might not be true of albums. At least it isn't true for that album. In addition to a lackluster set of songs, it featured really terrible artwork... The cover alone would have hampered out attempts at getting on any radio playlist, not to mention the music inside. And that's exactly what happened−no airplay and no sales."

== Track listing ==
=== Side one ===
No.	Title	Writer(s)	Length
1.	"Lazy Days"	Gram Parsons	3:03
2.	"Image of Me"	Harlan Howard, Wayne Kemp	3:21
3.	"High Fashion Queen"	Chris Hillman, Gram Parsons	2:09
4.	"If You Gotta Go"	Bob Dylan	1:52
5.	"Man in the Fog"	Bernie Leadon, Gram Parsons	2:32
6.	"Farther Along"	J.R. Baxter, W.B. Stevens	4:02

=== Side two ===
No.	Title	Writer(s)	Length
1.	"Older Guys"	Chris Hillman, Bernie Leadon, Gram Parsons	2:31
2.	"Cody, Cody"	Chris Hillman, Gram Parsons	2:46
3.	"God's Own Singer"	Bernie Leadon	2:08
4.	"Down in the Churchyard"	Chris Hillman, Gram Parsons	2:22
5.	"Wild Horses"	Mick Jagger, Keith Richards	6:26

== Personnel ==
The Flying Burrito Brothers

- Gram Parsons – vocals, piano
- Chris Hillman – vocals, bass, mandolin
- Bernie Leadon – guitar, Dobro
- Sneaky Pete Kleinow – pedal steel guitar
- Michael Clarke – drums

Additional personnel

- Leon Russell – piano on "Man in the Fog" and "Wild Horses"
- Byron Berline – fiddle
- Tommy Johnson – tuba
- Buddy Childers – cornet, flugelhorn
- Leopoldo C. Carbajal – accordion
- Frank Blanco – percussion

Production credits

- Producers – Jim Dickson, Henry Lewy
- Engineer – Henry Lewy
