= Chris Ethridge =

American country rock bass guitarist (1947–2012)

- Born: John Christopher Ethridge; February 10, 1947; Meridian, Mississippi, United States
- Died: April 23, 2012 (aged 65) Meridian, Mississippi, United States
- Genres: Country rock
- Occupations: Musician, songwriter
- Instruments: Bass guitar, piano
- Years active: 1964–2012
- Formerly of: International Submarine Band, The Flying Burrito Brothers

John Christopher Ethridge (February 10, 1947 – April 23, 2012) was an American country rock bass guitarist. He was a member of the International Submarine Band (ISB) and The Flying Burrito Brothers, and co-wrote several songs with Gram Parsons. Ethridge worked with Nancy Sinatra, Judy Collins, Leon Russell, Delaney Bramlett, Johnny Winter, Randy Newman, Graham Nash, Ry Cooder, Linda Ronstadt, The Byrds, Jackson Browne, and Willie Nelson.

== Career ==
Ethridge was born in Meridian, Mississippi, United States. He began playing in local bands in the South before moving to California aged 17, having been spotted in Biloxi. He played with Joel Scott Hill before joining Gram Parsons in ISB; in 1971, Hill and Ethridge would record a trio album (L.A. Getaway) with drummer John Barbata, best known for his work with The Turtles and Jefferson Starship. He played with Parsons after the end of ISB, and again after Parsons left The Byrds, before cofounding the Burrito Brothers with him. He played bass and piano on The Gilded Palace of Sin, but left before Burrito Deluxe due to creative differences. When Parsons left the Burritos, Ethridge briefly played with him again, touring with Byron Berline, Emmylou Harris, Clarence White, Gene Parsons, Sneaky Pete Kleinow, and Roland White in 1973. After Parsons' death, Ethridge played in 1974 with the Docker Hill Boys, an informal group which included Gene Parsons and Joel Scott Hill. These three refounded the Burritos in 1975 with Sneaky Pete and Gib Guilbeau, recording Flying Again.

Ethridge left the Burritos again in February 1976, returning to session work. He had been a session musician throughout his career, recording with many leading country-tinged acts, including Nancy Sinatra, Judy Collins, Johnny Winter, Ry Cooder, Leon Russell, Randy Newman, Linda Ronstadt, The Byrds and Jackson Browne. He also toured with Willie Nelson's band for almost eight years, and later played with the Kudzu Kings.

== Death ==
Ethridge died on April 23, 2012, at age 65 at a hospital in Meridian, Mississippi of complications from pancreatic cancer.

== Discography ==
On the following albums, Ethridge played bass unless stated otherwise:

| Year | Album | Act | Notes |
|---|---|---|---|
| 1968 | Safe at Home | International Submarine Band | |
| 1969 | The Gilded Palace of Sin | The Flying Burrito Brothers | co-wrote "Hot Burrito No. 1 (I'm Your Toy)" and "Hot Burrito No. 2" with Gram Parsons |
| 1969 | John Braden | John Braden | bass on "What a Friend We Have in Jesus", "Carriage House Song", and "Ribbons of Friendship" |
| 1970 | Greatest Hits | Phil Ochs | |
| 1970 | Washington County | Arlo Guthrie | |
| 1970 | Alone Together | Dave Mason | |
| 1970 | Ry Cooder | Ry Cooder | |
| 1970 | The Candlestickmaker | Ron Elliott | bass on "Molly in the Middle", "Lazy Day", "All Time Green" and "To the City, To the Sea" |
| 1971 | L.A. Getaway | Joel Scott Hill, Chris Ethridge, John Barbata | |
| 1971 | Just as I Am | Bill Withers | |
| 1971 | Songs for Beginners | Graham Nash | |
| 1971 | Home Grown | Johnny Rivers | |
| 1971 | White Light | Gene Clark | |
| 1971 | Rita Coolidge | Rita Coolidge | |
| 1972 | Full Circle | The Doors | bass on "Get Up and Dance" |
| 1972 | Sail Away | Randy Newman | |
| 1972 | Into the Purple Valley | Ry Cooder | |
| 1972 | Graham Nash David Crosby | Graham Nash & David Crosby | |
| 1973 | Baron Von Tollbooth and the Chrome Nun | Paul Kantner/Grace Slick / David Freiberg | |
| 1973 | GP | Gram Parsons | did not play; co-wrote "She" with Parsons |
| 1973 | Maria Muldaur | Maria Muldaur | played bass on 'Long Hard Climb', 'I Never Did Write You A Love Song', 'My Tennessee Mountain Home' and The Work Song' |
| 1973 | Don't Cry Now | Linda Ronstadt | |
| 1974 | Heart Like A Wheel | Linda Ronstadt | played bass on 'Faithless Love' |
| 1974 | Paradise and Lunch | Ry Cooder | |
| 1975 | Flying Again | The Flying Burrito Brothers | |
| 1976 | Chicken Skin Music | Ry Cooder | |
| 1977 | Simple Dreams | Linda Ronstadt | background vocals |
| 1977 | Class Reunion | Delaney Bramlett | bass |
| 1978 | Stardust | Willie Nelson | |
| 1979 | Sings Kristofferson | Willie Nelson | bass guitar |
| 1979 | Pretty Paper | Willie Nelson | |
| 1980 | Honeysuckle Rose OST | Willie Nelson | also had a small role in the film |
| 1991 | From Another Time | The Flying Burrito Brothers | recorded live in 1975 |
| 1994 | A John Prine Christmas | John Prine | |
| 1996 | Eye of a Hurricane | The Flying Burrito Brothers | bass; vocals on one track |
| 2002 | Red Album: Live Studio Party in Hollywood | The Flying Burrito Brothers | recorded live in 1976 |
| 2002 | Cherry Smiles: The Rare Singles | Nancy Sinatra | a collection of Sinatra's rare singles and B-sides from 1970 to 1980 |
| 2007 | Junkyard Junky | Dan Penn | |
