= The Flying Burrito Brothers =

American country rock band

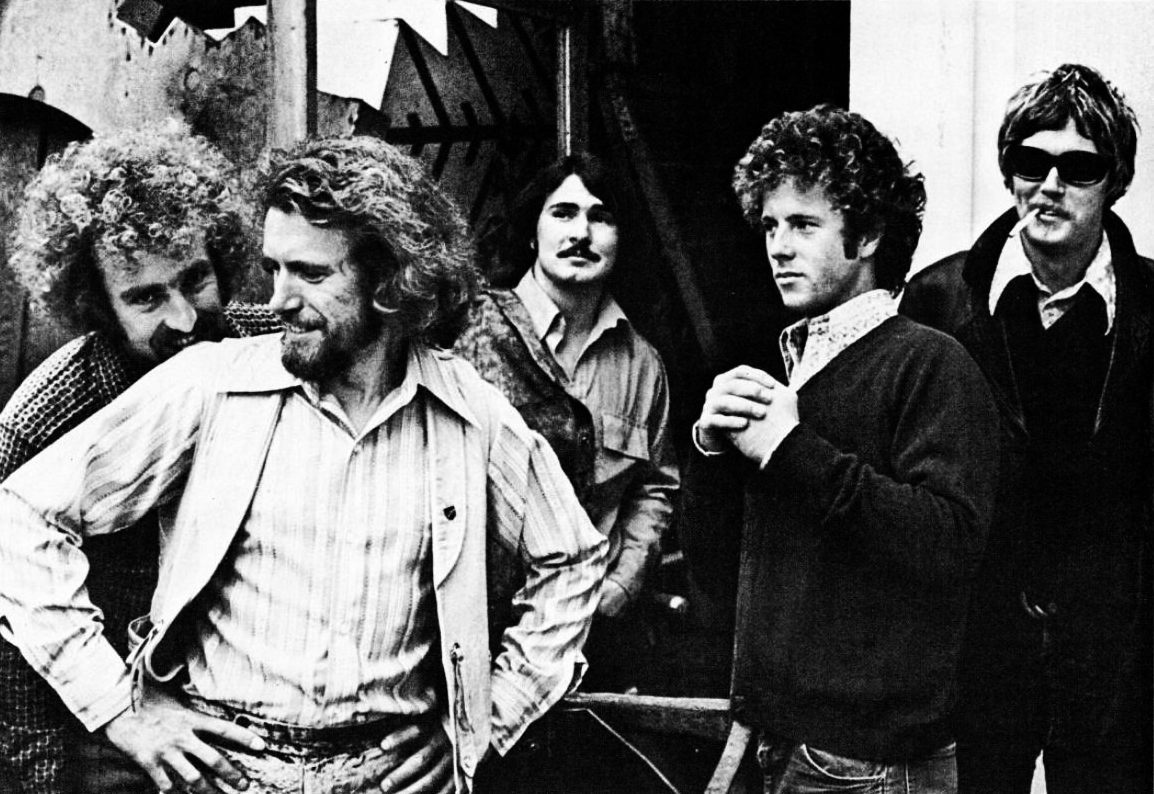
- The Flying Burrito Brothers in July 1971. Left to right: Bernie Leadon, Sneaky Pete Kleinow, Rick Roberts, Chris Hillman and Michael Clarke.

Background information
- Origin: Los Angeles, California
- Genres: Country rock; Progressive country
- Years active: 1968–1972 (as the Flying Burrito Brothers); 1975–1980 (as the Flying Burrito Brothers); 1977 (as Sierra); 1980–1987 (as Burrito Brothers); 1985–2001 (as the Flying Burrito Brothers); 2002–2009 (as Burrito Deluxe); 2009–2012 (as the Burritos); 2012–present (as the Burrito Brothers)
- Labels: A&M; Columbia; Curb; Relix
- Spinoffs: Manassas; Country Gazette
- Spinoff of: International Submarine Band; The Byrds
- Past members: Gram Parsons; Chris Hillman; "Sneaky" Pete Kleinow; Chris Ethridge; Michael Clarke; See members section for others

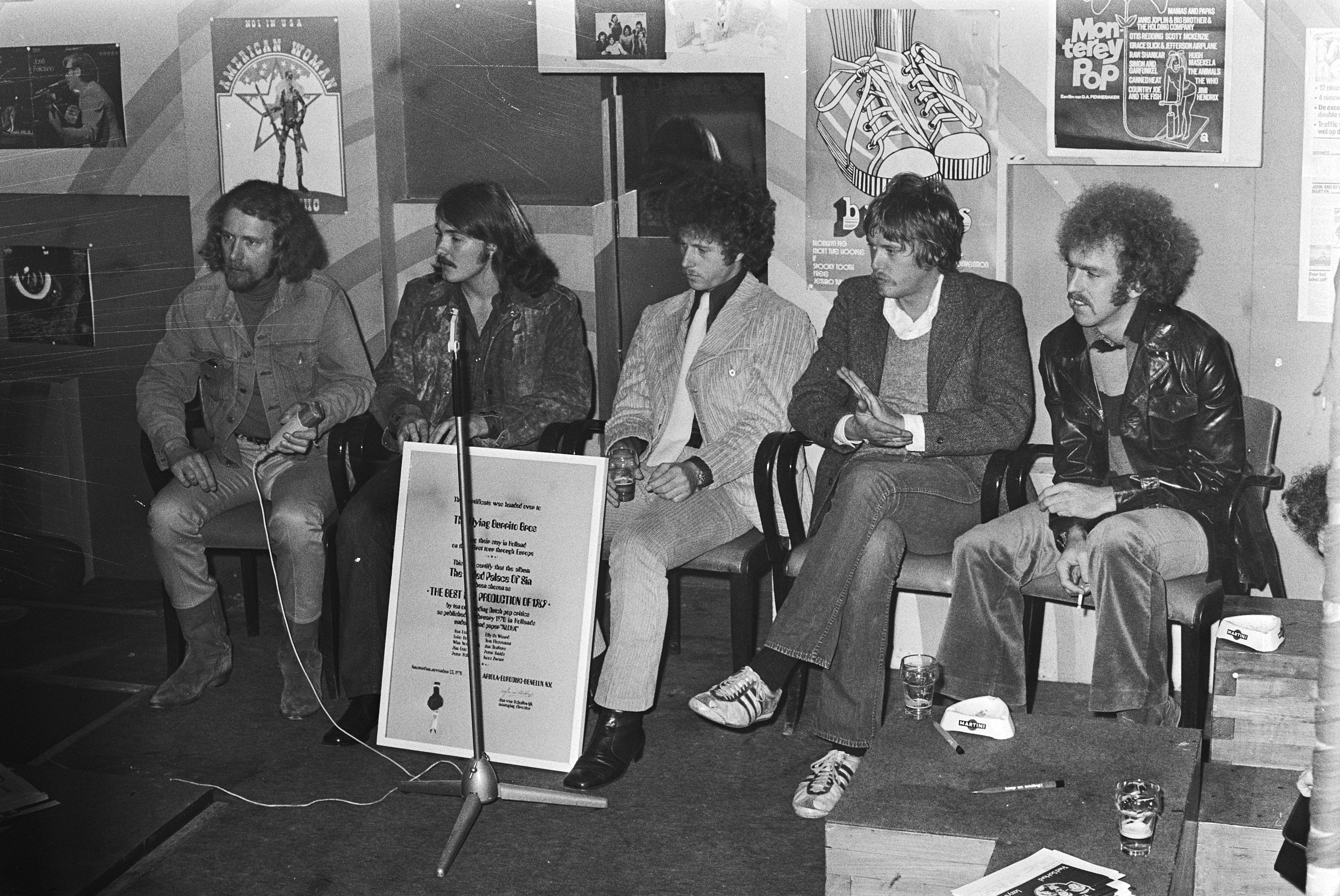
Flying Burrito Brothers (Amsterdam, 1970). Left to right: 'Sneaky' Pete Kleinow, Rick Roberts, Chris Hillman, Michael Clarke and Bernie Leadon.

The Flying Burrito Brothers are an American country rock band formed in Los Angeles, California, in 1968, best known for their influential 1969 debut album The Gilded Palace of Sin. Although the group is closely associated with founders Gram Parsons and Chris Hillman (both formerly of the Byrds), the band underwent numerous personnel changes and has existed in several distinct incarnations. Now officially known as the Burrito Brothers, the group continues to perform and release new music.

== Early evolution (1968–1969) ==
Ian Dunlop and Mickey Gauvin, formerly of Gram Parsons' International Submarine Band (ISB), founded the original Flying Burrito Brothers and named it after Parsons informed them of his new country focus. This incarnation of the band never recorded as such, and after heading East allowed Gram Parsons to take the name.

With the original incarnation of the band out of the picture, the "West Coast" Flying Burrito Brothers were founded in 1968 in Los Angeles, California, by Gram Parsons and Chris Hillman. Bassist/keyboardist Chris Ethridge (who had played alongside Parsons in the International Submarine Band), pedal steel guitarist "Sneaky" Pete Kleinow and session drummer "Fast" Eddie Hoh rounded out the lineup.

== Classic era (1968–1972) ==
Though Hillman and Roger McGuinn had fired Parsons from the Byrds in July 1968, the bassist and Parsons reconciled later that year after Hillman (who would switch to rhythm guitar in the new ensemble) left the group. Parsons had refused to join his Byrds bandmates for a tour of South Africa, citing his disapproval of the apartheid policy of that nation's government. Hillman doubted the sincerity of Parsons' gesture, believing instead that the singer merely wanted to remain in England with Mick Jagger and Keith Richards of the Rolling Stones, whom he had recently befriended.

The Flying Burrito Brothers recorded their debut album, The Gilded Palace of Sin (containing originals by Parsons, Hillman, and Ethridge alongside covers of two songs by the Southern soul songwriting duo of Dan Penn and Chips Moman), without a regular drummer. Hoh proved to be unable to perform adequately due to a substance abuse problem and was dismissed after recording two songs, leading the group to employ a variety of session players, including former International Submarine Band drummer Jon Corneal (who briefly joined the group as an official member, appearing on a plurality of the tracks) and Popeye Phillips of Dr. Hook & the Medicine Show. Before commencing their first tour, the group ultimately settled upon original Byrd Michael Clarke (who had recently been working with fellow country rock pioneers and Byrds spinoff the Dillard and Clark Expedition) as a permanent replacement. He remained the band's permanent drummer until 1971.

Despite widespread critical acclaim upon its release in February 1969 (as exemplified by Stanley Booth's laudatory review in Rolling Stone and positive press remarks by Bob Dylan) for its pioneering amalgamation of country, soul music, and psychedelic rock, The Gilded Palace of Sin stalled at No. 164 on the Billboard album chart. Although the band declined an invitation to perform at Woodstock, a comprehensive train tour of the United States (necessitated by Parsons' fear of flying) ultimately ended in disaster due to drug and alcohol use. Dissatisfied by the band's lack of success and unable to fully reconcile his predilection for R&B with the more conservative tastes of Parsons and Hillman, Ethridge departed the group in the autumn of 1969. Hillman reverted to bass after the band hired lead guitarist Bernie Leadon, a Dillard and Clark veteran who had also played with Hillman in the early 1960s bluegrass scene. This iteration of the band performed at the ill-fated Altamont Free Concert in December 1969, as documented in the film Gimme Shelter. The audience remained largely peaceful throughout their performance.

With mounting debt incurred from the first album and tour and a failed single ("The Train Song", written on the tour and produced by 1950s R&B musicians Larry Williams and Johnny "Guitar" Watson), A&M Records hoped to recoup some of their losses by marketing the Burritos as a straight country group. To this end, manager Jim Dickson instigated a loose session where the band recorded several traditional country staples from their live act (including songs by Merle Haggard and Buck Owens), contemporary pop covers in a countrified vein ("To Love Somebody", "Lodi", "I Shall Be Released", "Honky Tonk Women"), and Williams's rock and roll classic "Bony Moronie". This effort was soon scrapped in favor of a second album of originals on an extremely reduced budget. Several of the tracks from the abandoned sessions would eventually see the light of day in 1976 on Sleepless Nights, which also featured outtakes from Parsons's post-Burritos solo career.

Released in April 1970, Burrito Deluxe juxtaposed the band's inability to develop compelling new material (partially exacerbated by Parsons' hedonistic streak; his "Lazy Days" dated from 1967) with prominent covers of the Rolling Stones's hitherto unreleased "Wild Horses", Dylan's "If You Gotta Go, Go Now" and the Southern gospel standard "Farther Along". Unlike Gilded Palace, the album failed to chart entirely. A month later, Parsons showed up for a band performance only minutes before they were to take the stage. Visibly intoxicated, he began singing songs that differed from what the rest of the band were performing. A furious Hillman (already incensed by the singer's penchant for showing up at $500 concerts in a limousine and increasingly Jagger-influenced showmanship) fired him immediately after the show, to which Parsons responded, "You can't fire me, I'm Gram!" According to Hillman, this incident was merely the final straw; Parsons' desire to hang out with the Rolling Stones rather than focus on his own band's career was also a significant factor, mirroring his 1968 dismissal from the Byrds.

Now fronted by Hillman and Leadon, the band appeared in June–July 1970 on the Festival Express rail tour of Canada with Janis Joplin, the Grateful Dead, the Band, and other notable groups of the era. Parsons would eventually be replaced by guitarist/songwriter Rick Roberts. The new lineup released The Flying Burrito Bros in June 1971. Like its predecessors, it was not a commercial success, peaking at No. 176 in the United States. Shortly thereafter, Kleinow left to work as a session musician, while Leadon departed to co-found the Eagles. Al Perkins and Kenny Wertz replaced them for a final tour in autumn of 1971; during these performances, veteran bluegrass musicians Roger Bush (acoustic bass, vocals) and Byron Berline (fiddle) of Country Gazette participated as guests during an acoustic interlude. The band released Last of the Red Hot Burritos, a well-received live album culled from the tour, in May 1972.

The band dissolved immediately thereafter when Hillman and Perkins joined Stephen Stills' Manassas. Berline, Bush and Wertz continued with their own band, Country Gazette. Roberts assumed corporate ownership of the band from Hillman in October 1972 and assembled a makeshift lineup to fulfill contractual commitments for some 1973 European live shows. He briefly initiated a solo career before forming Firefall with Clarke. During his summer of 1973 recording sessions, Parsons reduced his heroin use but then overdosed on morphine on September 18, 1973.

== Later configurations (1974–present) ==
=== 1974–1980 ===
As Gram Parsons's influence and fame grew, so did interest in the Flying Burrito Brothers. This newfound popularity led to the release of Close Up the Honky Tonks in 1974, a double-LP compilation of album tracks, B-sides, and outtakes. Soon after, Kleinow and Ethridge put together a new incarnation of the band. When asked in 1972 about the band continuing without him, Parsons remarked, "The idea'll keep going on. It's not like it's dead or anything. Whether I do it or anybody else does it, it's got to keep going." Frequent Ethridge collaborator and former Canned Heat guitarist Joel Scott Hill, longtime country rock fiddle player and guitarist Gib Guilbeau and erstwhile Byrd multi-instrumentalist Gene Parsons also joined the group. Augmented by songwriter and session luminary Spooner Oldham from the Dan Penn/FAME Studios axis, the band released Flying Again on Columbia Records in 1975. Dominated by contributions from Guilbeau, Gene Parsons and Penn (including the single "Building Fires", a collaboration between Penn, "Always on My Mind" co-writer Johnny Christopher and maverick Memphis musical artist Jim Dickinson), the album was the most commercially successful effort by any iteration of the band, peaking at No. 138 on the Billboard album chart.

Ethridge was replaced by Byrds alumnus Skip Battin for the 1976 album Airborne. However, the lineup continued to evolve for the rest of the 1970s, with the band even releasing an album under the name Sierra while continuing to play shows as the Flying Burrito Brothers. In 1980, they had the first of several minor country hits with a version of Merle Haggard's "White Line Fever" from their album Live in Tokyo, released the previous year.

=== 1980–2000 ===
The early 1980s were a period of commercial success for the band. Curb Records encouraged the band to change its name and for most of the decade they were known simply as "Burrito Brothers". Gib Guilbeau reconnected with his bandmate from Swampwater, songwriter and guitarist John Beland. The two, initially along with Skip Battin and Sneaky Pete Kleinow, began moving the band's sound to a more radio friendly direction. Finally, the Burrito Brothers began to score well on the country charts. Skip Battin left shortly before the release of Hearts on the Line in 1981 due to the band's new direction. The album contained two Top 20 country hits, marking the first significant commercial chart success the band ever had. In 1981 they received the Billboard award for "Best New Crossover Group" from pop to country. The Burrito Brothers continued to work with the top session players in Nashville and Los Angeles, logging an impressive list of singles for Curb Records. In the 1980s they toured Europe, were featured at the Albi Nashville Festival in Albi, France, and performed with Emmylou Harris, Jerry Lee Lewis, and Tammy Wynette at London's Wembley Stadium. Also in the early 1980s, the Burrito Brothers were responsible for a campaign that finally saw Lefty Frizzell inducted into the Country Music Hall of Fame. In 1982, Kleinow, the sole original member, departed prior to the release of Sunset Sundown. In 1984, Beland and Guilbeau retired the Burritos and afforded Kleinow the chance to re-form essentially the late 1970s lineup with Skip Battin and Greg Harris, which continued to tour and release live albums for the rest of the 1980s.

In 1991 a lineup consisting of Beland, Guilbeau, Ethridge, Kleinow, and Australian singer Brian Cadd began work on a new album, Eye of a Hurricane. The band went without a regular drummer and used session drummer Ron Tutt, who had previously played with Elvis Presley. The band soon parted ways with Ethridge (for the third time) and Cadd. Ethridge was replaced by Larry Patton, and Gary Kubal was added as a full-time drummer. This lineup released California Jukebox in 1997. At this time Gib Guilbeau and Kleinow stopped working with the group because of health concerns. Kleinow was replaced by Wayne Bridge. In 1997, multi-instrumentalist Chris Golden (The Goldens, Oak Ridge Boys, Alabama) joined the band on tour playing keyboards. In 1999, the band released Sons of the Golden West, which, while receiving solid critical reviews, would prove to be the final album by the Flying Burrito Brothers, as Beland decided to end the band shortly after the turn of the millennium.

=== 2000–2010 ===
Sneaky Pete Kleinow then created a new Burrito project in 2002. This band was called Burrito Deluxe, because Beland still had rights to the original name at that time. This band featured Carlton Moody on lead vocals and Garth Hudson from the Band on keyboards. The first album of this incarnation, Georgia Peach, was conceived as a tribute to Gram Parsons. Kleinow left the band because of illness in 2005, leaving no direct lineage to any of the original 1969–1972 lineup. His final recordings appear on their 2007 album Disciples of the Truth.

=== 2010–present ===
In 2010, an English record label owner, Del Taylor, attempted to reactivate the band with any previous members he could find. Bernie Leadon, Chris Ethridge, Al Perkins, and Gene Parsons all agreed if Chris Hillman would join. Hillman was not interested in the project and instead took steps to acquire the rights to the name "The Flying Burrito Brothers" so that he could retire the band.

In 2011, a new lineup arose which included Walter Egan and Rick Lonow (from the remains of Burrito Deluxe) along with Fred and Chris P James. This lineup toured as the Burritos and released the album Sound As Ever (SPV Records). The album included an unfinished Gram Parsons song which would go on to be a trademark of the Chris James-era albums. After the last members of Burrito Deluxe left, and with no objection from Hillman, (so long as the word flying wasn't used), the band trade marked and reverted to "The Burrito Brothers" and continued to tour and record.

2012: Rusty Russell joins on bass. Band works live dates.

2013: James, James, Lonow and Russell are joined by Tony Paoletta on pedal steel.

2014-16: James, James, Paoletta, Jody Maphis and Peter Young are the working band on live dates. Ronnie Guilbeau and Walter Egan are occasional guests.

2017: Nashville session guitarist, Bob Hatter joins the group after Fred James departs. Hatter has previous history with Chris James in Mr. Hyde (with Boomer Castleman) and The Lost Sideshow (with Rick Lonow and Michael Webb). Bob logged endless hours with Tony Paoletta and Peter Young (also regular session men). These Burritos work on new material for their next album.

2018: The Burrito Brothers complete the "Still Going Strong" album. They play scattered dates, spending most of the year recording the album at Junction Studio in Madison, TN. Lineup: James, Paoletta, Hatter, John Sturdivant Jr, Larry Marrs, Coley Hinson.

2019: The group is Chris P James, Tony Paoletta, Bob Hatter and Peter Young returns.

To commemorate the 50th anniversary of "The Gilded Palace of Sin", The Burrito Brothers headline Will James' 12th annual Nashville Tribute to Gram Parsons playing the classic LP in its entirety, something no other incarnation of the band had ever done. Guests include: Ronnie Guilbeau, Walter Egan, Michael Curtis, Noah Bellamy, Larry Patton, Pamela Des Barres. The band writes, demos and records material for their next album. It is finished before the year ends. Their representative in England, Bob Boiling, gets them a worldwide deal with SFM Records.

2020: The group continues as Chris P James, Tony Paoletta, Bob Hatter and Peter Young. "The Notorious Burrito Brothers" is released worldwide on 6 March 2020 on CD and all other formats (except vinyl) through 'Store For Music' [Cat # SFMCD543] in Britain. Ronnie Guilbeau guests. Forward progress is halted due to the global pandemic. All tour dates cancelled. The group begins writing and recording demos for their next album. Bob Hatter is stricken with cancer. The hope is to still record the next album with him via remote equipment brought to his house. This process is greatly hindered by the pandemic.

2021: James, Paoletta, Hatter and Young begin recording the next album. Progress is slow due to Hatter's condition and the ongoing pandemic. Bob Hatter passes away on August 31. The group halts recording.

2022: Ready to get back into creative work, James, Paoletta and Young enlist guitarist and multi-instrumentalist, Steve Allen to complete recording the unfinished album. Tour dates are still on hold (as the pandemic hasn't subsided). The album, "Together", is completed. Bob Hatter is listed (one last time, in his honor) as a member of The Burrito Brothers. Steve Allen is credited as a special guest.

2023: James, Paoletta, Young & Allen are The Burrito Brothers. The album "Together" is released on SFM Records (England and worldwide), followed in October by 'Christmas' the band's first ever Christmas album

== Legacy ==
- Gram Parsons embarked on a solo career after being fired by Chris Hillman. He released two solo albums and continued to tour until his death on September 19, 1973.
- Chris Hillman remained a successful singer-songwriter, having been part of Manassas (with Burrito Al Perkins), the Souther-Hillman-Furay Band and a partial reunion of The Byrds in McGuinn, Clark & Hillman. In the 1980s, he found commercial success when he formed the Desert Rose Band (1986–93) with Herb Pedersen. He has continued to write, produce and record.
- Bernie Leadon went on to help found The Eagles.
- Rick Roberts and Michael Clarke formed Firefall with Jock Bartley from Gram Parsons' solo band. They had several radio hits in the late 1970s and early 1980s. Michael Clarke died in 1993. Rick Roberts is mostly retired but occasionally still plays solo shows and has reunited with Firefall on a few occasions.
- "Sneaky" Pete Kleinow continued to play with the Burritos off and on until his death in 2007. He is also known outside of the music world as one of the artists behind Gumby and for his work on The Empire Strikes Back.
- Gib Guilbeau retired following heart surgery and moved to Palmdale, California. He continued to appear occasionally at local functions in and around the Los Angeles area until his death in 2016. His son, Ronnie, occasionally performs with and writes songs for the current Burrito Brothers lineup.
- John Beland continues to produce acts in the U.S. and abroad. He achieved hit records in both Australia and Norway before moving to Brenham, Texas, where he has continued to write hits for performers such as the Whites ("Forever You"), Mark Farner ("Isn't It Amazing?"), and the Bellamy Brothers ("Cowboy Beat", "Hard Way to Make an Easy Living", and "Bound to Explode"). His songs have been covered by many acts, from Ricky Nelson to Garth Brooks.

== Band members ==
=== The Flying Burrito Brothers ===
==== Classic era ====
- Gram Parsons – guitar, piano, vocals (1968–1970)
- Chris Hillman – guitar, bass, vocals, mandolin (1968–1971)
- "Sneaky" Pete Kleinow – pedal steel guitar (1968–1971, 1973, 1974–1981, 1984–1997)
- Chris Ethridge – bass (1968–1969, 1974–1976, 1993)
- Eddie Hoh – drums (1968)
- Jon Corneal – drums (1968–1969)
- Michael Clarke – drums (1969–1971)
- Bernie Leadon – guitar, banjo, vocals (1969–1971)
- Rick Roberts – guitar, vocals (1970–1973)

==== Later members ====
- Al Perkins – pedal steel guitar, guitar (1971)
- Kenny Wertz – guitar, banjo, vocals (1971–1973)
- Roger Bush – bass, upright bass, vocals (1971–1973)
- Byron Berline – fiddle (1971–1973)
- Alan Munde – banjo (1972–1973)
- Don Beck – pedal steel guitar, mandolin (1973)
- Eric Dalton – drums (1972–1973)
- Joel Scott Hill – guitar, vocals (1974–1977)
- Gib Guilbeau – guitar, fiddle, vocals (1974–1984, 1986–1997)
- Gene Parsons – drums, vocals, guitar (1974–1976, 1978, 1979)
- Skip Battin – bass, vocals (1976, 1978–1980, 1984–1986)
- Thad Maxwell – bass, vocals (1976–1977, 1989)
- Ed Ponder – drums (1976, 1978)
- Mickey McGee – drums, vocals (1976–1978, 1979–1980)
- Bobby Cochran – guitar, vocals (1977)
- Robb Strandlund – guitar, vocals (1978)
- Greg Harris – guitar, banjo, fiddle, vocals (1978–1979, 1984–1986, 1994)
- John Beland – guitar, vocals (1979–1984, 1986–1987, 1989–2000)
- Jim Goodall – drums (1984–1989, 1994)
- David Vaught – bass (1986–1987, 1994)
- Larry Patton – bass, vocals (1989–1990, 1996–2000)
- Rick Lonow – drums (1989–1990, 1990–1994)
- George Grantham – drums (1990)
- Gary Kubal – drums (1990, 1994-2000)
- Brian Cadd – keyboards, vocals (1991–1996)
- Larry Gadler - bass (1993-1994)
- Wayne Bridge – pedal steel guitar (1997–2000)

=== The Flying Burrito Brothers (East) ===
- Barry Tashian - guitar, vocals (1967–1969)
- Billy Briggs II- keyboards (1967–1969)
- Ian Diablo - bass (1967–1969)
- Mickey Gauvin - drums (1967–1969)

=== Burrito Deluxe ===
- Carlton Moody – guitar, vocals (2002–2009)
- "Sneaky" Pete Kleinow – pedal steel guitar (2002–2005)
- Bobby Cochran – guitar, vocals (2002–2004)
- Willie Watson – guitar, vocals (2002)
- Tommy Spurlock – bass, vocals (2002)
- Jeff "Stick" Davis – bass (2002–2006)
- Rick Lonow – drums (2002–2005, 2009)
- Garth Hudson – keyboards (2002–2005)
- Richard Bell – keyboards (2005–2006)
- Brian Owings – drums (2005–2007)
- Supe Granda – bass (2006–2009)
- Walter Egan – guitar, vocals (2006–2009)

=== The Burrito Brothers ===
==== Current ====
- Chris James – keyboards, vocals (2010–present)
- Tony Paoletta – pedal steel guitar (2013–present)
- Peter Young – drums (2015–2016, 2019–present)
- Steve Allen - guitars, vocals (2022–present)

==== Former ====
- Fred James – guitar, vocals, pedal steel guitar (2010–2017)
- Walter Egan – guitar, vocals (2010–2012)
- Bob Hatter - guitar, vocals (2017–2021)
- Rusty Russell – bass (2012–2015)
- Jody Maphis – bass, vocals (2015–2017)
- Rick Lonow – drums (2010–2015)
- John Sturdivant Jr. – drums (2016–2018)

== Discography ==
Year	Credited As	Title	Billboard 200	Label
1969	The Flying Burrito Brothers	The Gilded Palace of Sin	164	A&M (Original Release)
1970	The Flying Burrito Brothers	Burrito Deluxe	—	A&M (Original Release)
1971	The Flying Burrito Brothers	The Flying Burrito Bros	176	A&M (Original Release)
1975	The Flying Burrito Brothers	Flying Again	138	Columbia
1976	The Flying Burrito Brothers	Airborne	—	Columbia
1977	Sierra	Sierra	—	Mercury
1981	The Burrito Brothers	Hearts on the Line	—	Curb
1982	The Burrito Brothers	Sunset Sundown	—	Curb
1994	The Flying Burrito Brothers	Eye of a Hurricane	—	Relix
1997	The Flying Burrito Brothers	California Jukebox	—	Icehouse
1999	The Flying Burrito Brothers	Sons of the Golden West (aka Honky Tonkin'')	—	Arista
2002	Burrito Deluxe	Georgia Peach	—	Lamon
2004	Burrito Deluxe	The Whole Enchilada	—	Corazong
2007	Burrito Deluxe	Disciples of the Truth	—	Luna Chica
2011	The Burritos	Sound as Ever	—	Yellow Label/SPV
2018	The Burrito Brothers	Still Going Strong	—	Junction
2020	The Burrito Brothers	The Notorious Burrito Brothers	—	SFM/MVD Entertainment Group
2023	The Burrito Brothers	Together	—	SFM/MVD Entertainment Group
2023	The Burrito Brothers	Christmas	—	SFM/MVD Entertainment Group
"—" denotes release did not chart or become certified.
