= Gib Guilbeau =

American Cajun country rock musician and songwriter (1937–2016)

- Born: Floyd August Guilbeau; September 26, 1937; Sunset, Louisiana, U.S.
- Died: April 12, 2016 (aged 78)
- Genres: Country rock; Cajun; folk rock; outlaw country; Bakersfield sound; Americana
- Instruments: Vocals; fiddle; guitar; mandolin
- Years active: 1960s–2000s

Floyd August "Gib" Guilbeau (September 26, 1937 – April 12, 2016) was an American Cajun country rock musician and songwriter. As a member of Nashville West, Swampwater, The Flying Burrito Brothers, and later The Burrito Brothers, Guilbeau helped pioneer the fusion of rock and country music in the 1960s.

== Biography ==
Guilbeau was born in Sunset, Louisiana, and raised among fiddle players. His father and brothers played fiddle, and Gib started playing fiddle at the age of fourteen.

In 1960, Guilbeau formed The Four Young Men with guitarist Wayne Moore, which Bobby Edwards then joined to become Bobby Edwards & the Four Young Men. Together, they released the single "You're the Reason", which became a nationwide hit, peaking at #4 Country and #11 on the Billboard Hot 100 in 1961.

In 1967 Guilbeau formed The Reasons (a.k.a. "Nashville West," actually the name of a club they played at in El Monte, CA), a short-lived country rock group with multi-instrumentalist Gene Parsons, who had played with Guilbeau in a band called the Castaways years earlier, guitarist Clarence White, formerly of the Kentucky Colonels, and Wayne Moore on bass. Along with bands such as the Byrds, Dillard & Clark and the International Submarine Band, Nashville West was one of the first country rock bands. Country rock notables such as Gram Parsons and future Flying Burrito Brother Sneaky Pete Kleinow would sit in with the group. It also provided backing for other groups, such as the Gosdin Brothers and others on Gary Paxton's Bakersfield International record label. The Reasons came to an end in 1968 when Gram Parsons abruptly left the Byrds and the group asked Clarence White (and, shortly thereafter, Reasons drummer Gene Parsons—no relation) to replace him.

In 1969, Guilbeau played in the group Swampwater, originally formed to back Linda Ronstadt following the breakup of the Stone Poneys. Swampwater played a unique brand of Cajun rock that had no precedents in rock music. Swampwater recorded two albums before they broke up.

In 1972, Guilbeau contributed to the soundtrack for the Martin Scorsese film Boxcar Bertha. In 1974, along with Gene Parsons and original members Chris Ethridge and Sneaky Pete Kleinow, he formed a latter-day version of the Flying Burrito Brothers. The band underwent many personnel changes, performing and recording sporadically into the 1990s.

Guilbeau died in 2016, aged 78.

As a songwriter, Guilbeau's songs have been covered by many artists, including The Byrds, Ricky Nelson, Bobby Womack, Ronnie Wood, and Rod Stewart.
