= The Complete Reprise Sessions =

Compilation album by Gram Parsons
- Released: June 20, 2006
- Recorded: September 1972 – July 1973
- Genre: Country rock
- Length: 162:06
- Label: Rhino
- Producers: Gram Parsons; James Austin; Rick Grech; Emmylou Harris

Gram Parsons chronology
Another Side of This Life: The Lost Recordings of Gram Parsons (2000)	The Complete Reprise Sessions (2006)	Gram Parsons Archives Vol.1: Live at the Avalon Ballroom 1969 (2007)

Professional ratings
Review scores
Source	Rating
AllMusic	4.5/5 stars
Freight Train Boogie	4.5/5 stars
Rolling Stone	4.5/5 stars

The Complete Reprise Sessions is a 3-disc compilation released in 2006 featuring both of Gram Parsons's early 1970s solo albums, GP and Grievous Angel. The third disc features interviews and previously unreleased alternate takes.

== Track listing ==
=== Disc one ===
1. "Still Feeling Blue" – 2:43
2. "We'll Sweep out the Ashes in the Morning" – 3:14
3. "A Song for You" – 5:00
4. "Streets of Baltimore" – 2:55
5. "She" – 5:01
6. "That's All It Took" – 3:01
7. "The New Soft Shoe" – 3:55
8. "Kiss the Children" – 3:00
9. "Cry One More Time" – 3:41
10. "How Much I've Lied" – 2:29
11. "Big Mouth Blues" – 3:58
12. GP Radio Promo – 1:01
13. How Did You Meet Emmylou Harris? – 1:54
14. The Story Behind "A Song for You"? – 0:23
15. The Story Behind "The New Soft Shoe"? – 0:54
16. WBCN Interview with Maxanne Sartori – 2:30
17. "Love Hurts" – 4:58
18. "Sin City" – 5:20

=== Disc two ===
1. "Return of the Grievous Angel" – 4:26
2. "Hearts on Fire" – 3:52
3. "I Can't Dance" – 2:24
4. "Brass Buttons" – 3:30
5. "$1000 Wedding" – 5:05
6. "Medley from Northern Quebec: Cash on the Barrelhead/Hickory Wind" – 6:28
7. "Love Hurts" – 3:42
8. "Ooh Las Vegas" – 3:32
9. "In My Hour of Darkness" – 3:49
10. "Return of the Grievous Angel" – 4:32
11. Did You Sing "Hickory Wind" at the Grand Ole Opry? – 1:50
12. What Differences Do You See Between Pure Country and Country Rock? – 1:09

=== Disc three ===
1. "She" (Alternate Version) – 4:58
2. "That's All It Took" (Alternate Version) – 3:02
3. "Still Feeling Blue" (Alternate Version) – 2:40
4. "Kiss the Children" (Alternate Version) – 2:59
5. "Streets of Baltimore" (Alternate Version) – 3:00
6. "We'll Sweep Out the Ashes in the Morning" (Alternate Version) – 3:18
7. "The New Soft Shoe" (Alternate Version) – 4:05
8. "Return of the Grievous Angel #1" (Alternate Version) – 4:28
9. "In My Hour of Darkness" (Alternate Version) – 3:46
10. "Ooh Las Vegas" (Alternate Version) – 3:45
11. "I Can't Dance" (Alternate Version) – 2:25
12. "Sleepless Nights" (Alternate Version) – 3:36
13. "Love Hurts" (Alternate Version) – 3:47
14. "Brass Buttons" (Alternate Version) – 3:27
15. "Hickory Wind" (Alternate Version)– 4:17
16. "Brand New Heartache" – 2:27
17. "Sleepless Nights" – 3:26
18. "The Angels Rejoiced Last Night" – 2:24

== Personnel ==
- Gram Parsons - Acoustic Guitar, Vocals
- Emmylou Harris - Vocals
- Barry Tashian - Guitar, Vocals
- Byron Berline - Fiddle, Mandolin
- James Burton - Dobro, Electric Guitar
- John Conrad - Bass
- Buddy Emmons - Pedal Steel
- Kim Fowley - Background vocals
- Sam Goldstein - Drums
- Emory Gordy Jr. - Bass
- Rick Grech - Bass
- John Guerin - Drums
- Glen Hardin - Organ, Piano
- Bernie Leadon - Acoustic Guitar, Dobro, Guitar
- Alan Munde - Banjo
- Herb Pedersen - Acoustic & Electric Guitar, Vocals
- Al Perkins - Pedal Steel
- Steve Snyder - Vibraphone
- N.D. Smart - Drums on "Sin City"
- Ronnie Tutt - Drums
