= Live 1973 =

1982 live album by Gram Parsons

Live album by Gram Parsons
- Released: 1982
- Recorded: March 13, 1973
- Venue: Ultra-Sonic Recording Studios, Hempstead, New York
- Genre: Country, country rock
- Label: Sierra Records
- Producer: John M. Delgatto, Marley Brant

Gram Parsons chronology
| Sleepless Nights (1976) | Live 1973 (1982) | Sacred Hearts & Fallen Angels: The Gram Parsons Anthology (2001) |

Professional ratings
Review scores
| Source | Rating |
|---|---|
| Allmusic | 4/5 stars |
| Robert Christgau | (B+) |

Live 1973 is a live album by Gram Parsons and the Fallen Angels. It was recorded at Ultra Sonic Recording Studios in Hempstead, New York on March 13, 1973, during a live radio broadcast from WLIR-FM, a station located in Garden City, New York. The album was recorded in between Parsons' only two solo studio albums, GP and Grievous Angel, though it was not officially released (on LP) until 1982, long after Parsons' 1973 death at age 26.

== Overview ==
As with both of Parsons' solo studio albums, Emmylou Harris provides prominent duet and harmony vocals. The Fallen Angels, however, were a different band than that which appeared on Parsons' two solo albums. As Parsons and Harris prepared to tour the United States in 1973 to promote his solo debut, GP, James Burton, Ronnie Tutt, and most of the band who performed on the album had prior commitments to Elvis Presley's TCB Band. Parsons instead assembled a crew of roadhouse pickers he dubbed "the Fallen Angels", and they began making their way through America's rock clubs and honky tonks.

The original album had eleven tracks, but included a 7-inch 45 rpm record with the encore medley on side one, and an interview with Parsons, Harris, and Jock Bartley plus a version of the Flying Burrito Brothers' "Hot Burrito #1" performed by Gene Parsons in tribute as the B-side. When later reissued by Rhino Records on CD in 1994. the medley and in between song patter were added but the interview segments and the Gene Parsons track were omitted.

== Track listing ==
1. "We'll Sweep Out the Ashes in the Morning" (Joyce Allsup) – 3:34
2. "Country Baptizing" (Jim Shumate) – 3:50
3. "Drug Store Truck Drivin' Man" (Roger McGuinn, Gram Parsons) – 4:33
4. "Big Mouth Blues" (Gram Parsons) – 4:34
5. "The New Soft Shoe" (Gram Parsons) – 5:02
6. "Cry One More Time" (Peter Wolf, Seth Justman) – 5:22
7. "Streets of Baltimore" (Tompall Glaser, Harlan Howard) – 3:08
8. "That's All It Took" (Darrell Edwards, Charlotte Grier, George Jones) – 2:45
9. "Love Hurts" (Boudleaux Bryant) – 4:31
10. "California Cotton Fields" (Dallas Frazier, Earl Montgomery) – 2:32
11. "Six Days on the Road" (Earl Green, Carl Montgomery) – 3:04
12. "Encore Medley: Bony Maronie/Forty Days/Almost Grown" (Larry Williams/Chuck Berry) – 5:50

== Personnel ==
- Gram Parsons – lead vocals, acoustic guitar
- Emmylou Harris – harmony vocals, lead vocals on "Country Baptizing", acoustic guitar

Fallen Angels

- Neil Flanz – pedal steel guitar
- N. D. Smart II – drums; harmony vocals on "The New Soft Shoe" and "Streets of Baltimore"
- Kyle Tullis – bass guitar
- Jock Bartley – electric guitar
