= Return of the Grievous Angel =

Single by Gram Parsons

from the album Grievous Angel
- B-side: "Hearts on Fire"
- Released: 1974 (album), 1982 (single)
- Recorded: Summer 1973
- Genre: Country rock
- Length: 4:14
- Label: Reprise Records
- Songwriter: Tom Brown / Gram Parsons
- Producer: Gram Parsons

"Return of the Grievous Angel" is a song written by Gram Parsons and poet Tom Brown. The song depicts the experiences of the character during a road travel across the United States.

The song was produced during the recording sessions of his second and last album, Grievous Angel. Parsons sang with the participation of Emmylou Harris backed with the main core of the TCB Band.

== Background and recording ==
In 1972 Gram Parsons signed a recording contract with Reprise Records. At the time, Parsons saw singer Emmylou Harris performing at a Washington D.C folk club. Parsons hired Harris and the core of Elvis Presley's TCB Band with James Burton (guitar), Ronnie Tutt (drums) and Glen Hardin (piano) for the recording of his solo debut album, GP. In the spring Parsons formed his road band, The Fallen Angels, and started a tour.

In the summer of 1973, Gram Parsons' Topanga Canyon home burned to the ground, the result of a stray cigarette. Nearly all of his possessions were destroyed with the fire. Following the incident, Parsons left his wife and moved into a spare room in Phil Kaufman's house. While not recording, he frequently hung out and jammed with country rockers Quacky Duck and His Barnyard Friends. At the time, Parsons took the role of producer and recorded new songs with his road band.

He then rounded up again the musicians he used for his GP album, and called for a new set of sessions in Los Angeles in the late summer. For the recording of "Return of the Grievous Angel", Eagles lead guitarist Bernie Leadon joined in, while Al Perkins played steel guitar and Byron Berline the fiddle. Parsons sang the lead, while Harris joined in harmony.

== Content ==
Parsons was inspired to write a song by Boston poet Tom S. Brown, who gave him his composition entitled "Return of the Grievous Angel". Brown wrote the lyrics with Parsons on his mind to sing them. Parsons revised the poem and adapted it for the song.

Recurrent in Parsons compositions, the themes of the song include instances of wandering, homesickness and experiences with road life. The song depicts a train traveling through the United States, with the name of the train being the "Grievous Angel". The singer tells "sweet Annie Rich" of his experiences on the journey, and his ultimate decision to return home based on his gained wisdom. It contains references to Presley as "the king" who wore "on his head an amphetamine crown" and his change of musical scene to Las Vegas. Parsons states that "(he) talked about unbuckling that old bible belt and lighted out for some desert town".

The music style included a mixture of folk revival and traditional country music. During the musical breaks, the song is led to a temporary harmony and melodic cadence, which progressively is restored to a four-measure phrase.

== Release ==
"Return of the Grievous Angel" became the opening song of Parson's second and last album Grievous Angel. In 1982, the song was reissued as a single, featuring "Hearts on Fire" on the B-side by Warner Bros. Records.

Mojo called the song "terrifically cinematic", a "country rock standard". BBC Radio stated that the song offered the casual listener "an easier way into modern country". Allmusic called the song a "beautiful and marvelously literate distillation of Parsons' musical style and the myth he created for himself". Meanwhile, it praised Brown's writing, determining that "(brought) an almost cinematic feel to his broad, sweeping narrative and lending a perspective that's impressionistic while still maintaining a firm grasp of the iconography of classic country music". The A.V. Club described its content as "surrealistic imagery ... swooning romanticism and playful sincerity that establishes a hypnotically dreamy mood". Popmatters felt that the song had "the right amount of self-mythologizing to make Parsons seem like his place in the pantheon had always been assured".

In 1999, it was covered by Lucinda Williams with the participation of David Crosby for Return of the Grievous Angel: A Tribute to Gram Parsons.

In 2012, it was covered by Counting Crows on the album Underwater Sunshine, an album composed mainly of covers.

In 2024, it was covered by Danish indie rock band The Raveonettes on their covers album The Raveonettes Sing....
