= Flanz =

Flanz is a surname. Notable people with the surname include:

- Jamie Flanz (1969–2006), Canadian outlaw biker and gangster
- Jen Flanz, Showrunner of The Daily Show
- Neil Flanz (1938–2021), Canadian pedal steel guitarist
