= Death of Gram Parsons =

Death of musician by overdose

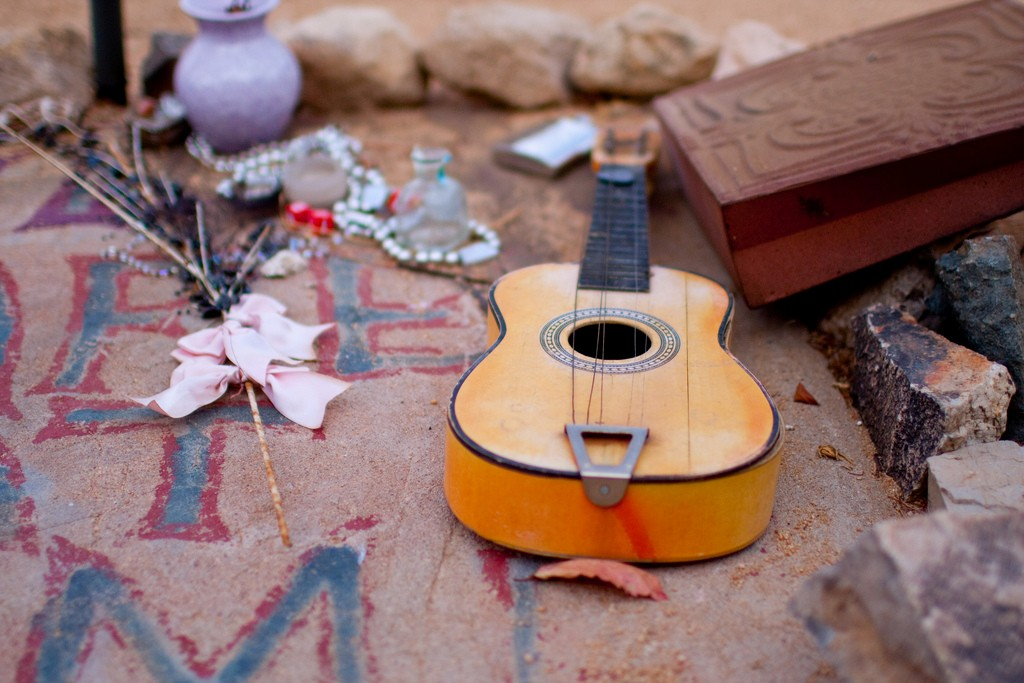
- Makeshift memorial dedicated to Parsons in Joshua Tree National Park
- Date: September 19, 1973; 53 years ago (official record)
- Time: 00:15 (official record)
- Location: Joshua Tree Inn, near Joshua Tree National Park, California, U.S.
- Cause: "Drug toxicity, days, due to multiple drug use, weeks"
- Burial: 1973 at Garden of Memories Cemetery, New Orleans, Louisiana

American musician Gram Parsons died on September 19, 1973, at the Joshua Tree Inn near Joshua Tree National Park in California. Encouraged by his road manager Phil Kaufman, Parsons visited the park after completing his latest recording sessions. Earlier, he had expressed to Kaufman his wish to be cremated and for his ashes scattered in the park after he died.

Parsons traveled to Joshua Tree with Margaret Fisher (his girlfriend), Michael Martin (his assistant), and Dale McElroy (Martin's girlfriend). Parsons spent time in the desert during the day and at local bars at night. On September 18, after being injected with morphine, Parsons overdosed. On September 19, he was declared dead on arrival at the hospital.

Following Parsons' death and in order to fulfill his desires, Kaufman and Martin arrived at Los Angeles International Airport in Martin's personal Cadillac hearse impersonating mortuary workers. Under the impression that they had been hired by the Parsons family, Western Airlines released the Parsons' body to them. They then transported it to Joshua Tree and set it on fire. The burning casket was reported by campers to local authorities, who investigated the incident and identified both perpetrators.

Parsons' partially cremated remains were recovered and returned to his family. Kaufman and Martin were fined for burning the casket, and were ordered to pay for Parsons' funeral. Parsons' remains were later buried at Garden of Memories Cemetery in Metairie, Louisiana.

== Background and Parsons' death ==
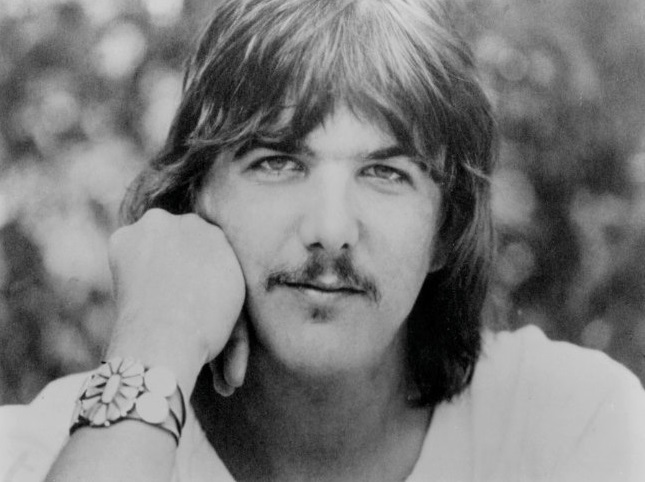
Gram Parsons in 1972

During the 1960s, as a member of the Flying Burrito Brothers, Gram Parsons became fascinated by Joshua Tree National Monument. The singer visited the park several times. During the recording sessions held in the summer of 1973 (later released on the album Grievous Angel, in 1974), Parsons had reduced his use of heroin but retook the habit as the recording finished. Incited by his road manager, Phil Kaufman, Parsons went on a trip to Joshua Tree in September 1973. He was accompanied by Margaret Fisher (his high school girlfriend, with whom he had recently resumed his relationship), assistant Michael Martin and his girlfriend Dale McElroy. Parsons drove Martin and McElroy in his new Jaguar, while Fisher flew from San Francisco.

Kaufman later declared that Parsons' attorney was preparing divorce papers for him to serve them to Parsons' wife, Gretchen Burrell, while the singer was in Joshua Tree on September 20. The travelers stayed at the Joshua Tree Inn, room eight. During the trip, Parsons often retreated to the desert, while at night the group would visit local bars, where he sat in with the bands. Excepting McElroy, he and his companions consumed alcohol and barbiturates in large amounts. On September 18, Martin drove back to Los Angeles to resupply the group with marijuana. Parsons purchased liquid morphine that night from an unknown girl, who injected him and Fisher. Parsons overdosed in Room 1. Fisher gave Parsons an ice-cube suppository and later sat him in a cold shower. Instead of moving him around the room, she put him to bed back in Room 8 and went out to buy coffee to try and wake Parsons, leaving McElroy to watch over him. As his respirations became irregular and later ceased, McElroy attempted resuscitation. As she failed, Fisher tried again upon her return. After more failed attempts, they called an ambulance. Parsons was declared dead on his arrival at High Desert Memorial Hospital, at 00:15 on September 19, 1973, in Yucca Valley, California.

== Body-theft incident ==
Initially, the San Bernardino County coroner declared Parsons' death to be from "natural causes, pending autopsy". An inconclusive autopsy was later performed. Fisher called Kaufman, who arrived at Joshua Tree on September 19. Fisher had cleared room 8 of all of the drugs soon after Parsons' death, while Kaufman searched Parsons' car upon his arrival. Kaufman then drove Fisher and McElroy back to Los Angeles in Parsons' Jaguar, to evade the police in case they were looking for the two women.

Kaufman then proceeded to make phone calls to the San Bernardino Coroner's office and found out that the body was being moved to Los Angeles International Airport to be transferred to Western Airlines. He then called the company and was told that the body was to be shipped to New Orleans for the funeral. The embalmed body of Parsons was reported as stolen on September 20.

Kaufman and Martin had arrived at Los Angeles International Airport in McElroy's 1953 Cadillac Hearse and impersonated workers of a funeral parlor, claiming that Parsons' family had arranged for them to take the body to New Orleans via a chartered flight departing from Van Nuys Airport. The cargo manager could not find the transfer request among his papers but assumed that it was a last-minute change and decided to release the body to the two men. Kaufman signed the papers as "Jeremy Nobody", and proceeded to request a patrolman who parked behind the hearse to move his car away so he could load the casket. The patrolman helped Kaufman and Martin, who were struggling to move the coffin. As a result of his nervousness in the presence of the patrolman and his previous consumption of alcohol, Martin drove the car into a wall of the hangar, in front of the officer. The patrolman evidently did not suspect them of any illegal activity, and the two left with Parsons' body.

Earlier that year, Kaufman and Parsons had attended Clarence White's funeral. After singing an impromptu rendition of the song "Farther Along" while the casket was lowered, Parsons told Kaufman "don't let this happen to me" and explained to him his desire to be cremated and his ashes scattered in Joshua Tree. When they arrived at Joshua Tree, Kaufman opened the casket and poured in five gallons of gasoline, set the body on fire, and left.

On their way back to Los Angeles, the two stopped to sleep off their drunkenness. When they woke up, the hearse did not start and Kaufman had to hike to reach a mechanical shop. The hearse started again after a few repairs and the two returned to the road, where they were later involved in a car pile-up on the highway and rear-ended another car. A police officer handcuffed them both when several beer cans fell from the vehicle as one of the doors opened. While the officer went to assure no other drivers were hurt in the accident, Martin slipped his hand out of the cuffs and fled with Kaufman. Since the officer did not take the driver's license of either one or even the license plate number, he could not identify them.

Following the report of the body theft, the casket was sighted burning by campers, who alerted park authorities. A green Western Airlines body bag was found beside the casket. The body was not thoroughly cremated, as 35 pounds remained. Witnesses reported seeing a hearse speeding away from the scene, recalling that other vehicles had been forced off the road. After mugshots of the believed perpetrators were shown to witnesses from the airport, Investigator Joe E. Hamilton declared that the police were close to the identification. Kaufman and Martin were identified from the mugshots, arrested, and charged with grand theft. While the two awaited judgment, the San Bernardino County Coroner declared to the press that Parsons' death was caused by "multiple drug abuse, in part due to overdose of whiskey, barbiturates, and cocaine".

Kaufman and Martin were given thirty-day suspended jail sentences, fined $300 each for misdemeanor theft, and charged $708 for funeral home expenses. Kaufman threw a benefit party to raise funds to pay the fines. The event was called "Kaufman's Koffin Kaper Koncert". Doctor Demento was the featured disc jockey and beer bottles with the figure of Parsons on the label and the inscription "Gram Pilsner: A stiff drink for what ales you" were served.

== Aftermath ==
A small family service was organized for the burial of Parsons in New Orleans. Shocked by the theft, failed cremation, and the fundraiser, the family regarded it all as a Kaufman publicity stunt and denied there could have been any promise between Parsons and his manager. He was buried at Memorial Lawn Cemetery with the epitaph "God's Own Singer". Kaufman wrote about his experience stealing the body of Parsons in his autobiography, Road Mangler Deluxe. The events were loosely depicted in the 2003 film Grand Theft Parsons, starring Johnny Knoxville.

Joshua Tree National Park does not officially recognize Parsons' link to the park, and his memorial does not appear on the maps. Rangers are given the option to tell the story, but it does not appear on brochures either. While Parsons was incinerated a quarter-mile away from Cap Rock, that location is often confused with the actual place where it happened. Makeshift memorials and inscriptions are found around the rock and cleared by the park caretakers. Tourists and fans of Parsons visit the site, as well as the Joshua Tree Inn, where a guitar-shaped statue dedicated to Parsons can be found outside. Room 8 is reserved by the current owner for people who ask specifically to stay there for its relation to Parsons, and it is not offered to walk-in guests. The only remaining furniture from the time is a mirror found near the bed.

Parsons' former Burritos bandmate Bernie Leadon, who was in The Eagles at the time of Parsons' death, objected to the disrespectful way Kaufman cremated him in Joshua Tree, describing it as "a partial, unattended burning" and "not a proper cremation."
