= Return of the Grievous Angel: A Tribute to Gram Parsons =

Compilation album by various artists
- Released: July 13, 1999
- Genre: Alternative country Country rock Americana
- Length: 53:16
- Label: Almo Sounds
- Producer: Emmylou Harris; Paul Kremen

Professional ratings
Review scores
Source	Rating
Allmusic	4.5/5 stars

Return of the Grievous Angel: A Tribute to Gram Parsons is a 1999 tribute album to pioneering country rock musician Gram Parsons, co-produced by his one-time singing partner, Emmylou Harris and featuring cover versions of songs written/co-written by or popularized by Parsons, performed by Harris, Beck, Wilco, The Pretenders, Cowboy Junkies, Elvis Costello, Sheryl Crow, Lucinda Williams, David Crosby, Steve Earle, Chris Hillman and many other artists. The album was released from Almo Sounds and benefited Vietnam Veterans of America Foundation's "Campaign for a Landmine Free World."

The album surveys Parsons's songwriting efforts from his time with International Submarine Band and the Flying Burrito Brothers to his solo career.

The album cover features a photo of Parsons's ornate tailored suit jacket designed by Nudie Cohn, which was worn for the cover of the Burritos' album, The Gilded Palace of Sin. Parts of the album were performed on September 19, 1999, on the PBS show Sessions at West 54th Street. The performance included a version of the song "Wheels" which did not appear on the album by Chris Hillman and Jim Lauderdale. Emmylou Harris, Steve Earle, Chris Hillman, Ryan Adams and Whiskeytown, Jim Lauderdale, Gillian Welch, David Rawlings, and Bernie Leadon were some of the performers on the show.

== Track listing ==
No.	Title	Artist(s)	Length
1.	"She"	The Pretenders and Emmylou Harris	4:51
2.	"Ooh Las Vegas"	Cowboy Junkies	5:21
3.	"Sin City"	Beck and Emmylou Harris	4:01
4.	"$1000 Wedding"	Evan Dando and Juliana Hatfield	3:07
5.	"Hot Burrito #1"	The Mavericks	3:54
6.	"High Fashion Queen"	Chris Hillman and Steve Earle	3:06
7.	"Juanita"	Sheryl Crow and Emmylou Harris	2:42
8.	"Sleepless Nights"	Elvis Costello	3:57
9.	"Return of the Grievous Angel"	Lucinda Williams and David Crosby	4:19
10.	"One Hundred Years From Now"	Wilco	2:53
11.	"A Song For You"	Whiskeytown	6:40
12.	"Hickory Wind"	Gillian Welch	4:38
13.	"In My Hour of Darkness"	Rolling Creekdippers	4:47
Total length:			53:16
