= Big Backyard Beat Show =

Studio album by BR5-49
- Released: 1998
- Recorded: November 1997
- Genre: Country
- Length: 41:05
- Label: Arista
- Producer: Jozef Nuyens; Mike Janas

BR5-49 chronology
BR5-49 (1996)	Big Backyard Beat Show (1998)	Bonus Beats (1998)

Big Backyard Beat Show is the second album by the American band BR5-49, released in 1998. It peaked at No. 38 on Billboard's Top Country Albums chart and at No. 7 on the UK Country Artists Album chart. The first single was "Wild One", a cover of the Johnny O'Keefe song; it was nominated for a Grammy Award for "Best Country Performance by a Duo or Group with Vocal". The band supported the album with North American and UK tours.

== Production ==
Recorded in November 1997, the album was produced by Jozef Nuyens and Mike Janas. BR5-49 wrote nine of its songs. "Georgia on a Fast Train" is a cover of the Billy Joe Shaver song. "There Goes My Love" was written by Buck Owens. "Seven Nights to Rock" is a version of the song made famous by Moon Mullican. "18 Wheels and a Crowbar" is a tale of road rage. "My Name Is Mudd" is about a town pariah. Santiago Jiménez Jr. played accordion on "Goodbye, Maria". The band considered remixing some of the tracks for a harder sound, but instead chose to have Steve Albini record live tracks for them to use on an EP, Bonus Beats.

== Critical reception ==
Professional ratings
Review scores
Source	Rating
The Atlanta Journal-Constitution	B−
The Baltimore Sun	3/4 stars
Edmonton Journal	3.5/5 stars
Lincoln Journal Star	4.5/5 stars
Los Angeles Times	2.5/4 stars
The Ottawa Citizen	4/5 stars
San Francisco Examiner	4/5 stars
USA Today	3/4 stars
The Virgin Encyclopedia of Nineties Music	4/5 stars

The Baltimore Sun concluded that, "as clever as the lyrics sometimes are, the album's real allure is its blend of boogie piano, blues guitar, honky tonk twang, and Tex-Mex exuberance." The Lincoln Journal Star wrote that "Chuck Mead and Gary Bennett are both solid writers—Mead's work tends toward the rock end of things while Bennett recycles the old country feel in his hurtin' songs." USA Today noted that the originals "tend toward the dark or humorous, though guitarist Gary Bennett's 'Storybook Endings (If You Stop Believin')' has both a lyric and a meter that Roger Miller would've appreciated." The Ottawa Citizen stated that "rockabilly, one of modern country music's principal roots, is a key element in the group's recipe." The Scotsman considered the music to be "fired by a raw-edged punk sensibility and mellowed with authentic back-porch charm."

The Washington Post said that Mead "has a dark, humorous streak, as heard in the paean to road rage, '18 Wheels and a Crowbar', and in 'Goodbye, Maria', a tale of suicide set to the happy-sad strains of a polka." The Atlanta Journal-Constitution opined: "Like the Stray Cats or Big Bad Voodoo Daddy, BR5-49 has plopped down in a musical era—in this case, 1950s big-twang, cigarettes-and-ashtrays country—which it excavates like an obsessed college kid in a vintage clothing store." The Los Angeles Times determined that Mead and Bennett "lack the vocal depth and character to make BR5-49 more than a particularly skilled bar band with a well-developed playful streak." The Boston Globe wrote that "BR5-49 owe a great deal of their success to a flat refusal to distill the genre for the sake of accessibility."

== Track listing ==
Big Backyard Beat Show track listing
No.	Title	Writer(s)	Length
1.	"There Goes My Love"	Buck Owens	2:09
2.	"Wild One"	Dave Owens, Johnny Greenan, Johnny O'Keefe, Tony Withers	2:34
3.	"Hurtin' Song"	Bob Regan, Keith Sewell	2:41
4.	"Out of Habit"	Chuck Mead	2:28
5.	"Storybook Endings (If You Stop Believin')"	Gary Bennett	3:18
6.	"18 Wheels and a Crowbar" (live at Robert's Western World, January 1996)	Mead, Shaw Wilson	4:57
7.	"Pain, Pain Go Away"	Bennett	2:24
8.	"You Are Never Nice to Me"	Bennett	2:45
9.	"Goodbye, Maria"	Mead	3:45
10.	"Seven Nights to Rock"	Buck Trail, Louis Innis	2:47
11.	"My Name Is Mudd"	Mead	3:13
12.	"You Flew the Coop"	Bennett	2:23
13.	"Change the Way I Look"	Mead	2:38
14.	"Georgia on a Fast Train"	Billy Joe Shaver	3:03
Total length:			41:05
