= Sacred Hearts & Fallen Angels: The Gram Parsons Anthology =

Sacred Hearts and Fallen Angels: The Gram Parsons Anthology

Compilation album by Gram Parsons
- Released: May 1, 2001
- Recorded: July 12, 1967–July 1973
- Genre: Country rock
- Label: Rhino

Gram Parsons chronology
Live 1973 (1982)	Sacred Hearts and Fallen Angels: The Gram Parsons Anthology (2001)	Another Side of This Life: The Lost Recordings of Gram Parsons (2000)

Professional ratings
Review scores
Source	Rating
Allmusic	5/5 stars

Sacred Hearts and Fallen Angels: The Gram Parsons Anthology is a compilation of Gram Parsons's albums from 1968 to 1976 and was released in 2001. It features segments from the International Submarine Band, The Byrds, The Flying Burrito Brothers, and his solo albums, and includes unreleased live tracks and non-LP tracks. Emmylou Harris, Chris Robinson of The Black Crowes, and Chris Hillman and Roger McGuinn of The Byrds contributed to the liner notes.

== Track listing ==
Disc 1

1. "Blue Eyes" - The International Submarine Band
2. "Luxury Liner" - The International Submarine Band
3. "Do You Know How It Feels to Be Lonesome?" - The International Submarine Band
4. "I Must Be Somebody Else You've Known" - The International Submarine Band
5. "Miller's Cave" - The International Submarine Band
6. "Knee Deep in the Blues" - The International Submarine Band
7. "Hickory Wind" - The Byrds
8. "You're Still on My Mind" - The Byrds
9. "The Christian Life" - The Byrds
10. "You Don't Miss Your Water" - The Byrds
11. "One Hundred Years from Now" - The Byrds
12. "Christine's Tune (Devil in Disguise)" - The Flying Burrito Brothers
13. "Sin City" - The Flying Burrito Brothers
14. "Do Right Woman" - The Flying Burrito Brothers
15. "The Dark End of the Street" - The Flying Burrito Brothers
16. "Wheels" - The Flying Burrito Brothers
17. "Juanita" - The Flying Burrito Brothers
18. "Hot Burrito #1" - The Flying Burrito Brothers
19. "Hot Burrito #2" - The Flying Burrito Brothers
20. "High Fashion Queen" - The Flying Burrito Brothers
21. "Older Guys" - The Flying Burrito Brothers
22. "Cody, Cody" - The Flying Burrito Brothers
23. "Wild Horses" - The Flying Burrito Brothers
24. "Sing Me Back Home" (by Merle Haggard) - The Flying Burrito Brothers

Disc 2

1. "To Love Somebody" (by the Bee Gees) - The Flying Burrito Brothers
2. "Still Feeling Blue" - Gram Parsons
3. "We'll Sweep Out the Ashes in the Morning" - Gram Parsons
4. "A Song for You" - Gram Parsons
5. "Streets of Baltimore" - Gram Parsons
6. "She" - Gram Parsons
7. "The New Soft Shoe" - Gram Parsons
8. "Kiss the Children" - Gram Parsons
9. "How Much I've Lied" - Gram Parsons
10. "Drug Store Truck Drivin' Man" - Gram Parsons & The Fallen Angels
11. "That's All It Took" - Gram Parsons & The Fallen Angels
12. "California Cotton Fields" - Gram Parsons & The Fallen Angels
13. "Return of the Grievous Angel" (Remix) - Gram Parsons
14. "Hearts on Fire" - Gram Parsons
15. "Brass Buttons" - Gram Parsons
16. "$1000 Dollar Wedding" - Gram Parsons
17. "Love Hurts" - Gram Parsons
18. "Ooh Las Vegas" - Gram Parsons
19. "In My Hour of Darkness" - Gram Parsons
20. "Brand New Heartache" - Gram Parsons
21. "Sleepless Nights" - Gram Parsons
22. "The Angels Rejoiced Last Night" - Gram Parsons
