= BR5-49 (album) =

Studio album by BR5-49
- Released: September 17, 1996
- Genre: Country
- Length: 33:27
- Label: Arista Nashville
- Producers: Mike Janas, Jozef Nuyens

BR5-49 chronology
Live at Robert's (1996)	BR5-49 (1996)	Big Backyard Beat Show (1998)

Professional ratings
Review scores
Source	Rating
AllMusic	4.5/5 stars
Entertainment Weekly	B+

BR5-49 is the debut studio album of the American country rock band BR5-49. The album was released in 1996 on the Arista Nashville label. Three singles were released from the album, all of which charted on the Billboard Hot Country Singles & Tracks (now Hot Country Songs) charts. "Cherokee Boogie", the first of these three, was the highest charting, reaching #44. Following it were "Even If It's Wrong" at #68 and "Little Ramona (Gone Hillbilly Nuts)" at #61.

== Track listing ==
1. "Even If It's Wrong" (Gary Bennett) – 3:16
2. "Cherokee Boogie" (Moon Mullican, Chief William Redbird) – 2:31
3. "Honky Tonk Song" (Buck Peddy, Mel Tillis) – 2:36
4. "Lifetime to Prove" (Chuck Mead) – 3:03
5. "Little Ramona (Gone Hillbilly Nuts)" (Mead) – 3:24
6. "Crazy Arms" (Ralph Mooney, Chuck Seals) – 2:50
7. "I Ain't Never" (Webb Pierce, Tillis) – 2:11
8. "Chains of This Town" (Mead) – 4:04
9. "Are You Gettin' Tired of Me" (Bennett) – 2:13
10. "Hickory Wind" (Bob Buchanan, Gram Parsons) – 4:15
11. "One Long Saturday Night" (Mead) – 3:12

== Personnel ==
From BR5-49 liner notes.

BR5-49

- Gary Bennett – lead vocals, background vocals, acoustic guitar
- Don Herron – steel guitar, Dobro, fiddle, mandolin, acoustic guitar
- "Smilin'" Jay McDowell – upright bass
- Chuck Mead – lead vocals, background vocals, acoustic guitar, electric guitar
- "Hawk" Shaw Wilson – background vocals, drums

Additional musician

- Mike Janas – acoustic guitar, six-string bass guitar, percussion

Technical

- Don Cobb – digital editing
- Mike Janas – production, recording
- John Kelton – mixing
- Jozef Nuyens – production
- Denny Purcell – mastering

== Chart performance ==
Chart (1996)	Peak position
U.S. Billboard Top Country Albums	33
U.S. Billboard Top Heatseekers	11
Canadian RPM Country Albums	12
