= Gram Parsons Archives Vol.1: Live at the Avalon Ballroom 1969 =

Live album by The Flying Burrito Brothers
- Released: November 6, 2007
- Recorded: April 4 and 6, 1969
- Venue: Avalon Ballroom
- Genre: Country rock
- Length: 98:18
- Label: Amoeba
- Producer: Dave Prinz

The Flying Burrito Brothers chronology
Sin City: The Very Best of the Flying Burrito Brothers (2002)	Gram Parsons Archives Vol.1: Live at the Avalon Ballroom 1969 (2007)

Gram Parsons chronology
The Complete Reprise Sessions (2006)	Gram Parsons Archives Vol. 1: Live at the Avalon Ballroom 1969 (2007)

Gram Parsons Archives Vol.1: Live at the Avalon Ballroom 1969 is a live album by the country rock band the Flying Burrito Brothers. It was recorded on April 4 and 6, 1969, at the Avalon Ballroom in San Francisco. It was released by Amoeba Records as a two-disc CD on November 6, 2007. Comprising 27 tracks, the album includes several songs not previously released by the band, such as "She Once Lived Here" and "You Win Again".

The Avalon concerts featured the Flying Burrito Brothers' original lineup – Gram Parsons on guitar, piano, and vocals, Chris Hillman on guitar and vocals, Sneaky Pete Kleinow on pedal steel guitar, Chris Ethridge on bass, and Michael Clarke on drums. The shows were performed two months after the release of the band's first album, The Gilded Palace of Sin.

Live at the Avalon Ballroom 1969 also includes two bonus tracks. These are previously unreleased demos featuring Gram Parsons and recorded by Jimmi Seiter – "Thousand Dollar Wedding", recorded in Los Angeles in 1969, and "When Will I Be Loved", recorded in New York City in 1967.

== Provenance ==
At the April 4 and 6 Avalon Ballroom concerts, the Flying Burrito Brothers, along with the band Aum, were the opening acts for the Grateful Dead. Amoeba Records co-founder Dave Prinz found tapes of the two shows among the 16,000 hours of material in the Grateful Dead's vault, and after considerable lobbying, convinced the Dead's sound engineer Owsley "Bear" Stanley, who oversaw the Dead's material, to license the Burritos' recordings to Amoeba's record label. It was regarded as a coup because Stanley hadn't licensed anything from his personal vault since 1970.

== Critical reception ==
Professional ratings
Review scores
Source	Rating
AllMusic	3.5/5 stars
Glide Magazine	4/5
Pitchfork	8.2/10

AllMusic said, "[Gram] Parsons probably came closest to realizing his "cosmic American music" dream during his brief stay as a founding member of the Flying Burrito Brothers, and so this double-disc release, which features well-recorded live sets from 1969 of the original Burritos lineup... is a true archival treasure, perhaps doubly so because it comes direct from the famed Grateful Dead tape vault. The real surprise here is the sound quality, which is excellent... Fans of Parsons and the Flying Burrito Brothers are going to love Gram Parsons Archive, Vol.1 and the solid sound quality of these recordings will no doubt surprise and delight. A real find."

In Pitchfork, Stephen Deusner wrote, "Parsons may have stood center stage in 1969, but this was truly a Burrito Brothers show. The band sounds tremendous on the first disc, with a superlatively tight rhythm section carrying each song and Sneaky Pete Kleinow adding flourishes of pedal steel.... Even though the tracklists for these discs are nearly identical, the shows themselves aren't redundant. Instead, they reveal the Burrito Brothers' considerable musical chemistry while providing a useful historical document of the nights they turned the Avalon into a rowdy roadhouse."

Glide Magazine said, "... this lineup of Burritos not only didn't last that long, nor did they crackle with the same energy here for that long either. Drummer Michael Clarke, once in the Byrds with vocalist / guitarist / songwriter Chris Hillman, had not appeared on the band's debut studio album, while bassist Chris Ethridge would depart before the second was recorded. This quintet cooks here, whether on the upbeat likes of "Mental Revenge" or the doleful mood of "Sin City". And it's worth paying special attention to the alternately traditional and visionary pedal steel of "Sneaky" Pete Kleinow. Captured on tape and preserved by the Grateful Dead's soundman Owsley Stanley (as the Burritos were opening for the Frisco icons on this run), it's no surprise the sound quality is so high."

Houston Press wrote, "Although the Flying Burrito Brothers was a passing phase in Gram Parsons's career between the Byrds and his solo material, the band nevertheless indicated that he'd become one of country-rock's greatest treasures.... With all the documentation of Parsons's hard-to-handle persona, he sounds quite sincere throughout these two nights. The album's another reminder of this once-overlooked musician's chops – even early in his career, he was utterly convincing as a country-rocker."

== Track listing ==
Disc 1

April 4, 1969:

1. "Close Up the Honky Tonks" (Red Simpson) – 2:38
2. "Dark End of the Street" (Chips Moman, Dan Penn) – 3:57
3. Medley: "Undo the Right" / "Somebody's Back in Town" (Willie Nelson, Hank Cochran / Don Helms, Theodore Wilburn, Doyle Wilburn) – 3:16
4. "She Once Lived Here" (Autry Inman) – 3:54
5. "We've Got to Get Ourselves Together" (Bonnie Bramlett, Delaney Bramlett, Carl Radle) – 3:31
6. "Lucille" (Richard Penniman, Albert Collins) – 2:38
7. "Hot Burrito #1" (Chris Ethridge, Gram Parsons) – 3:40
8. "Hot Burrito #2" (Ethridge, Parsons) – 4:05
9. "Long Black Limousine" (Vern Stovall, Bobby George) – 3:38
10. "Mental Revenge" (Mel Tillis) – 3:07
11. "Sin City" (Parsons, Chris Hillman) – 4:02

Bonus tracks:

12. "Thousand Dollar Wedding" (Parsons) – 4:24
13. "When Will I Be Loved" (Phil Everly) – 2:16

Disc 2

April 6, 1969:

1. Medley: "Undo the Right" / "Somebody's Back in Town" (Nelson, Cochran / Helms, T. Wilburn, D. Wilburn) – 3:16
2. "She Once Lived Here" (Inman) – 4:06
3. "Mental Revenge" (Tillis) – 3:13
4. "We've Got to Get Ourselves Together" (B. Bramlett, D. Bramlett, Carl Radle) – 3:43
5. "Lucille" (Penniman, Collins) – 2:39
6. "Sin City" (Parsons, Hillman) – 4:08
7. "You Win Again" (Hank Williams) – 3:06
8. "Hot Burrito #1" (Ethridge, Parsons) – 3:53
9. "Hot Burrito #2" (Ethridge, Parsons) – 4:00
10. "You're Still On My Mind" (Luke McDaniel) – 2:34
11. "Train Song" (Parsons, Hillman) – 3:43
12. "Long Black Limousine" (Stovall, George) – 3:15
13. "Dream Baby (How Long Must I Dream)" (Cindy Walker) – 3:18
14. "Do Right Woman" (Chips Moman, Dan Penn) – 5:01

== Personnel ==
The Flying Burrito Brothers

- Gram Parsons – lead vocals, guitar, piano
- Chris Hillman – guitar, backing vocals
- Chris Ethridge – bass
- Sneaky Pete Kleinow – pedal steel guitar
- Michael Clarke – drums

Additional musicians

- Tom Constanten – organ on "Hot Burrito #1" (both discs) and "Hot Burrito #2" (disc 2 only)

Production

- Produced for release by Dave Prinz
- Recording – Owsley Stanley
- Mastering – Paul Stubblebine
- Art direction – David Gorman, Arthur Nakata, Charlie Terrell
- Photos – Tom Wilkes, Andree Nathanson
- Liner notes – Pamela Des Barres, Dave Prinz

== Chart performance ==
Chart (2007)	Peak position
U.S. Billboard Top Country Albums	45
