= Another Side of This Life: The Lost Recordings of Gram Parsons =

Compilation album by Gram Parsons
- Released: December 19, 2000
- Recorded: March 13, 1965 – December 1966
- Genre: Folk music
- Label: Sundazed
- Producer: Bob Irwin

Gram Parsons chronology
Sacred Hearts & Fallen Angels: The Gram Parsons Anthology (2000)	Another Side of This Life: The Lost Recordings of Gram Parsons (2000)	The Complete Reprise Sessions (2006)

Professional ratings
Review scores
Source	Rating
AllMusic	2/5 stars

Another Side of This Life: The Lost Recordings of Gram Parsons is a 2000 compilation of early recordings by Gram Parsons. It features only previously unreleased recordings. The singing style and musical arrangements are much different from Parsons's subsequent, more country-influenced music.

== Track listing ==
1. "Codine" (Buffy Sainte-Marie) – 5:37
2. "Wheel of Fortune" (Gram Parsons) – 2:29
3. "Another Side of This Life" (Fred Neil) – 2:40
4. "High Flyin' Bird" (Billy Edd Wheeler) – 3:49
5. "November Nights" (Parsons) – 3:38
6. "Zah's Blues" (Parsons) – 4:02
7. "Reputation" (Tim Hardin) – 3:09
8. "That's the Bag I'm In" (Fred Neil) – 3:14
9. "Willie Jean" (Traditional) – 4:08
10. "They Still Go Down" (Dick Weissman) – 2:26
11. "Pride of Man" (Hamilton Camp) – 2:45
12. "The Last Thing on My Mind" (Tom Paxton) – 3:44
13. "Hey Nellie Nellie" (David Fromer, Jonathan Fromer, Elbert Robinson) – 3:04
14. "She's the Woman I Love/Good Time Music" (Danny Adams, Sam Moffitt) – 4:58
15. "Brass Buttons" (Parsons) – 2:25
16. "I Just Can't Take It Anymore" (Parsons) – 3:29
17. "Searchin'" (Jerry Leiber, Mike Stoller) – 3:32
18. "Candy Man" (Rev. Gary Davis) – 3:17

== Personnel ==
- Gram Parsons – acoustic guitar, vocals
