= Sleepless Nights (Gram Parsons album) =

Compilation album by Gram Parsons
- Released: April 1976
- Recorded: 1970 (with the Flying Burrito Brothers) 1973 (with Emmylou Harris/Grievous Angel Sessions)
- Genre: Country rock
- Length: 37:28
- Label: A&M

Gram Parsons chronology
Grievous Angel (1973)	Sleepless Nights (1976)	Live 1973 (1982)

Professional ratings
Review scores
Source	Rating
AllMusic	3/5 stars
Christgau's Record Guide	B−

Sleepless Nights is a posthumous compilation album by Gram Parsons. Credited to Parsons and his former band the Flying Burrito Brothers, the band appear on nine of the album's twelve tracks (not appearing on "Brand New Heartache", the title track and "The Angels Rejoiced Last Night"). The album features no original songs; the majority are covers of vintage country songs; the exception is the Rolling Stones' song "Honky Tonk Women".

== Overview ==
The songs that comprise Sleepless Nights were collected from two sources. In early 1970, the Flying Burrito Brothers, featuring Parsons, recorded several songs for an anticipated no-nonsense country album. The album was ultimately never released due to Parsons' departure from the band. Nine of Sleepless Nights' tracks come from these sessions. The remaining three songs are from the summer 1973 sessions for Grievous Angel, Parsons' final solo album, and feature duets with Emmylou Harris on the Everly Brothers' songs "Brand New Heartache" and "Sleepless Nights", as well as the gospel-etched "The Angels Rejoiced Last Night".

The album has received mixed reviews. Robert Christgau noted that the songs "were outtakes for a reason", but nonetheless gave the album a B− rating. Some of the highest praise for the album is due to the inclusion of the three tracks featuring Harris and omitted from the 1973 album Grievous Angel; "Sleepless Nights" (allegedly the original title for the Grievous Angel album), "The Angels Rejoiced Last Night" and "Brand New Heartache". Rolling Stone has referred to the album as "sluggish and dispirited", due in large part to Parson's impending departure from the group which lingered over the recording sessions. Chris Hillman has long maintained the nine Burritos tracks were simply practice sessions and never intended to be released.

== Track listing ==
1. "Brand New Heartache" (Felice Bryant, Boudleaux Bryant) - 2:28
2. "Tonight the Bottle Let Me Down" (Merle Haggard) - 2:55
3. "Sing Me Back Home" (Merle Haggard) - 3:53
4. "Your Angel Steps Out of Heaven" (Jack Ripley) - 3:12
5. "Crazy Arms" (Ralph Mooney, Charles Seals) - 2:48
6. "Sleepless Nights" (Felice Bryant, Boudleaux Bryant) - 3:23
7. "Close Up the Honky Tonks" (Red Simpson) - 2:20
8. "Together Again" (Buck Owens) - 3:13
9. "Honky Tonk Women" - (Mick Jagger, Keith Richards) - 4:19
10. "Green, Green Grass of Home" (Curly Putman) - 4:05
11. "Dim Lights, Thick Smoke (And Loud, Loud Music)" (Joe Maphis) - 2:56
12. "The Angels Rejoiced Last Night" (Charlie Louvin, Ira Louvin) - 2:23

== Personnel ==
- Gram Parsons - lead vocals (all tracks)
- James Burton - electric lead guitar (tracks 1, 6, 12)
- Michael Clarke - drums (tracks 2–5, 7–11)
- Emory Gordy Jr. - bass guitar (tracks 1, 6, 12)
- Glen D. Hardin - piano (tracks 1, 6, 12)
- Emmylou Harris - backing vocals (tracks 1, 6, 12)
- Chris Hillman - bass guitar, backup vocals (tracks 2–5, 7–11)
- Sneaky Pete Kleinow - pedal steel guitar (tracks 2–5, 7–11)
- Bernie Leadon - lead guitar, backup vocals (tracks 2–5, 7–11); acoustic guitar (tracks 1, 6, 12)
- Herb Pedersen - acoustic rhythm guitar (tracks 1, 6, 12)
- Al Perkins - pedal steel guitar (tracks 1, 6, 12)
- Ronnie Tutt - drums (tracks 1, 6, 12)
- Byron Berline - fiddle, mandolin (tracks 1, 6, 12)
