= Neil Flanz =

Canadian guitarist (1938–2021)

Neil Lanny Flanz (June 22, 1938 – December 2, 2021) was a Canadian pedal steel guitarist who grew up in Montreal. In the mid-1960s he moved to Nashville and played on the Grand Ole Opry. He later lived in Florida and Austin, Texas. The Austin Chronicle dubbed Flanz' playing style as "country traditionalist". He is perhaps best known for his performance as a member of Gram Parsons' Fallen Angels. He played and toured for over 30 years with artists including Marcia Ball, Emmylou Harris, Charlie Louvin and Joe Sun. Flanz was inducted into the International Steel Guitar Hall of Fame in 2016.

== Biography ==
His musical influences as a child included Jimmie Rodgers, Wilf Carter, Hawaiian music and the Grand Ole Opry radio broadcasts. He began playing guitar at the age of 13 when his parents bought him a flat top guitar; by the time he was 17, he had moved on to the lap steel guitar and played a double-neck Fender Stringmaster. He was influenced by Bud Isaacs' unique sound on a 1954 Webb Pierce recording called "Slowly", the first hit record to feature a pedal steel guitar. In order to replicate this new sound, Flanz enlisted Montreal steel guitarist George Essery to modify his guitar with a pedal.

His first job as a musician was with Cowboy Jack, a Montreal artist with several country music hits in French. During the ensuing years, Flanz worked with various musicians in Montreal and began making albums of his own, including 1962's Neil Flanz and his Nashville Steel, and 1964's Get On The Star Route (recorded in Toronto using an Emmons Stereo pedal steel guitar). The success of the two albums gained him recognition, both in Canada and the United States. He toured in the Toronto area with Dusty King, and in Ontario with Jack Kingston and Gary Buck.

At age 24, Flanz worked in Montreal's "Country Palace" backing up many Nashville artists including Charlie Louvin of the Louvin Brothers duet. Charlie Louvin brought Flanz to Nashville and got him his green card by saying no other steel guitarist would do. After obtaining his green card, Flanz moved to Nashville, where he worked as a session guitarist and toured with Louvin, Jean Shepard, Billy Walker, Ray Pillow and many other Grand Ole Opry artists. He eventually connected with Nashville’s "The Kelly Rogers Breed" with a regular engagement at the "Broadway Barn" located near the Ryman Auditorium from which the Opry originated.

=== Tour with Gram Parsons ===
In 1973, Phil Kaufman hired Flanz to perform a six-week tour with Gram Parsons and Emmylou Harris. The tour was put together to promote Parsons' solo debut album entitled "GP". The newly-created band was called "The Fallen Angels" and featured Kyle Tullis on bass, N.D. Smart on drums and Jock Bartley on lead guitar. The rehearsals were at Kaufman's house in Van Nuys. According to Parsons' biographer Ben Fong-Torres, "More often than not, rehearsals were fueled by marijuana and liquor". Speaking about the rehearsals Emmylou Harris said. "Gram knew so many songs that we never finished anything". On their first show in Boulder, Colorado, the undisciplined rehearsals translated to blunders on stage and Harris was horrified, especially by the fact that the audience included Rock and Roll Hall of Famer member Richie Furay of the band Poco. Subsequently Parsons met with the band and agreed to curtail his substance abuse and they voted to replace the guitarist by hiring Jock Bartley. They came up with song arrangements and improved greatly with each performance.

Flanz was more country-oriented and not used to rock-concert crowds. He cited the Parsons tour as one of the most exciting parts of his career, with thousands of cheering young long-haired fans crowding the stage just to touch the band members. Parsons' Live: 1973 album was recorded live for a radio broadcast in the middle of the tour by the Fallen Angels and features Flanz' steel playing.

=== Later years ===
After the Parsons tour, Flanz returned to Nashville to rejoin the "Kelly Rogers Breed", which later changed its name to "Peppertree". In the following months, he also toured with Roy Drusky, returning to play in Nashville whenever possible. This eventually led to a regular engagement at the Deeman's Den (named after owner and singer Nancy Dee). His shows there regularly featured sit-ins by Little Jimmy Dickens, Faron Young, Johnny Paycheck, Webb Pierce, Jimmy Day, Buddy Emmons and Jimmy Bryant.

Over the ensuing years, Flanz spent time touring the country with various groups, including stops in Austin and Dallas, and a two-week stint introducing President Jimmy Carter on a primary tour in North Carolina. From 1973 to 1975 Flanz toured with Jon Corneal and the Orange Blossom Special. The band included Jon Corneal, Gene Watson, Larry Broido and Michael Barnett. In 1980, Joe Sun called and offered Flanz a job as his full-time pedal steel player. The band, called “Shotgun”, rehearsed in Key West, FL for a month before beginning touring and playing in Nashville, at which time Joe asked the band to record with him in the studio as well. Living On Honky Tonk Time was the first album featuring the band, and the song "Bombed Boozed and Busted" climbed the top twenty of the country charts, and remained a juke box favorite. The band played on the Austin City Limits television show and made three trips to Europe, including shows at London's famed Wembley Stadium. The band also toured Stockholm, Zurich, Amsterdam, Germany, and Scotland. Two albums featuring Flanz were recorded in Nashville for release in Germany on the Intercord label (German Wikipedia page: de:Intercord) and a second album for Elektra Records was released called I Aint Honky Tonkin' No More.

Flanz lived in Austin, Texas, where he played regular shows with FingerPistol. He taught all levels of pedal steel guitar. In 1969 he recorded an instruction album for the Sho-Bud Company teaching the Nashville approach to the E9 tuning. He also published a book entitled "Pedal Steel Chord Dictionary for the C6 Nashville SetUp". Flanz played a double neck Emmons pedal steel guitar.

Flanz died December 2, 2021, several days after abdominal surgery.

== Sources ==
- Twenty Thousand Roads: The Ballad of Gram Parsons and His Cosmic American Music, David N. Meyer, Villard Books, 2007. ISBN 978-0-375-50570-6
- Neil Flanz Personal Home Page
