= Chris Scruggs =

American singer-songwriter

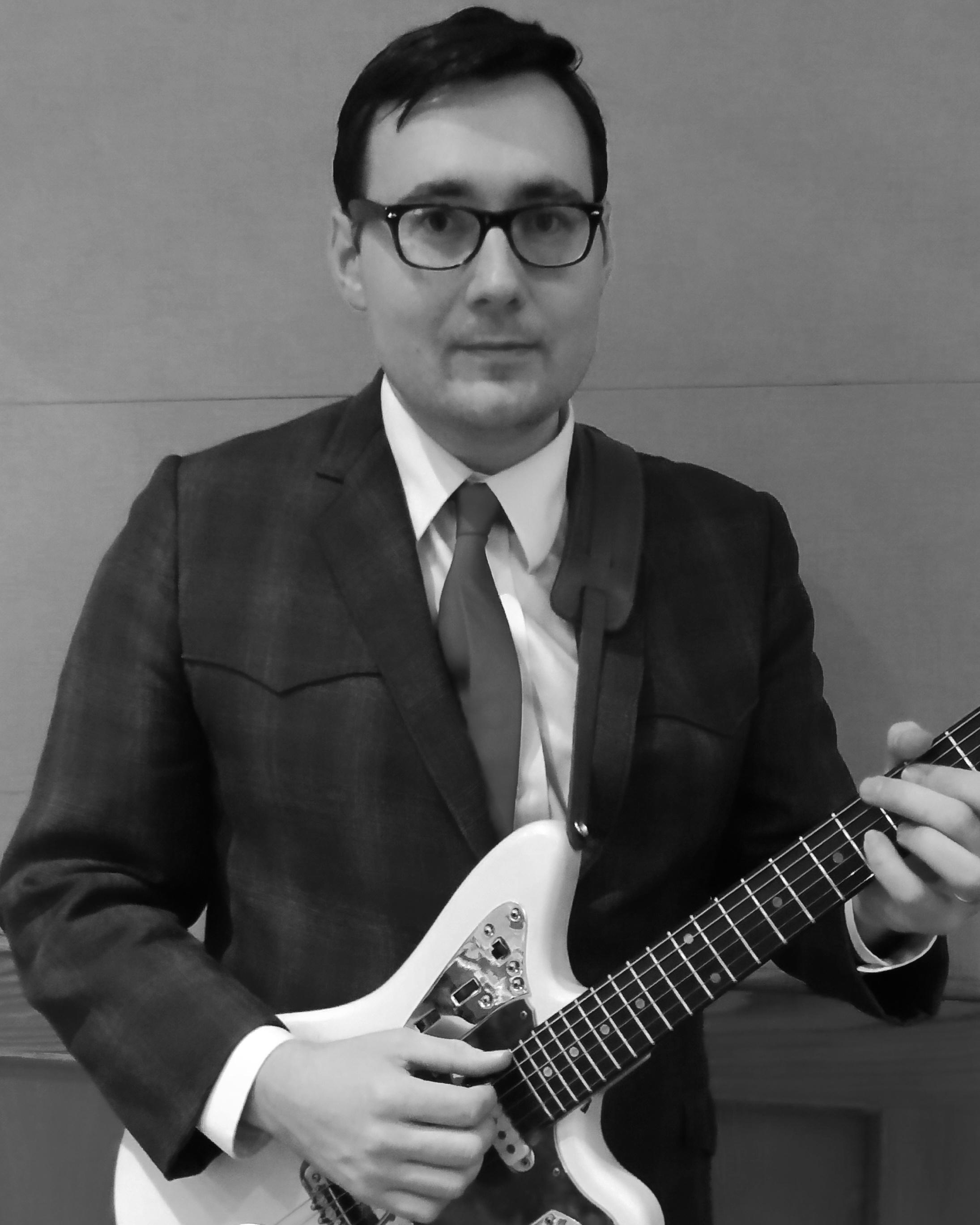
- Chris Scruggs in November 2013

Background information
- Born: Christopher Alan Davies-Scruggs; December 16, 1982 (age 43)
- Genres: Country, folk, rock and roll
- Occupations: Musician, songwriter, singer
- Instruments: Vocals, guitar, steel guitar, bass, mandolin, fiddle, drums
- Label: Cogent Records
- Formerly of: BR549
- Website: chrisscruggs.com

Chris Scruggs (born Christopher Alan Davies-Scruggs; December 16, 1982) is an American singer, songwriter, and instrumentalist who plays guitar, steel guitar, bass, mandolin, fiddle, and drums. He is the youngest son of songwriter Gary Scruggs and singer/songwriter and producer Gail Davies. His paternal grandfather is bluegrass banjo legend Earl Scruggs and his maternal grandfather is the late country singer Tex Dickerson.

Scruggs joined the country rock band BR549 in 2002, playing guitar and serving as the co-lead singer. While in the band, he wrote and performed the title track of their 2004 release, Tangled in the Pines. Scruggs remained in BR549 until 2005, when he left to pursue a solo career. Scruggs released his first solo album, entitled Anthem, in 2009 on Cogent Records. Scruggs produced the album and wrote 11 of the 12 songs; Ron Davies, Scruggs's uncle (best known for having penned "It Ain't Easy" for David Bowie) wrote the remaining song.

Chris Scruggs performing with Michael Nesmith in April 2013

As a side musician, Scruggs has played for many notable artists, including Charlie Louvin, Andrew Bird, Ray Price, Robbie Fulks, Jools Holland, Giant Sand, Peter Noone, Bobby Bare, M. Ward, Michael Nesmith, She & Him, Billy Walker, Tracey Baker, Suzy Bogguss, and Marty Stuart.

Scruggs is, as of 2026, the bass guitarist in Marty Stuart's Fabulous Superlatives band, taking over for Paul Martin in 2015.
