= Chuck Mead =

American musician

- Born: Charles Lynn Mead; December 22, 1960 (age 65)
- Instrument: Guitar
- Years active: 1990s–present
- Formerly of: BR5-49
- Website: chuckmead.com

Charles Lynn Mead is an American singer, songwriter, guitarist, producer, and musical director. He is a founding member of the country rock band BR5-49. Mead has performed and recorded as a solo artist since 2009 and acted as musical director/supervisor for the Broadway musical Million Dollar Quartet since 2006. He also served as musical supervisor/director for the television miniseries Sun Records.

== Early life ==
Mead was born in Nevada, Missouri, on December 22, 1960, but was raised in Kansas. He lived in what was then mostly rural Overland Park until 1970, when his school teacher father and bank teller mother moved him and his sister to Lawrence, Kansas. He graduated from South Jr. High School and Lawrence High School, then briefly attended the University of Kansas.

== First bands ==
In 1973, Mead joined his family's country and western band, The Wynes Country Rhythm Band (later called The Family Tree). He played drums and sang early rock 'n roll songs by the likes of Chuck Berry, Elvis Presley, and Carl Perkins. The band, consisting of Mead's uncle, mother, grandfather, and father, performed at dances and programs throughout Missouri and Kansas until 1980.

In his later teens, Mead switched from drums to guitar, and over the next decade, formed several rock 'n' roll bands with various musician friends around Lawrence, Kansas. Most notable was the Homestead Grays, which between 1986 and 1990, released two records: "Big Hits" and "El Supremo." After they broke up in 1992, Mead formed a duo with future BR5-49 drummer Shaw Wilson, called Dos Cojones, before moving to Nashville in 1993.

== BR5-49 ==
Mead moved to Nashville in 1993, and soon landed a job playing as a solo singer/songwriter in the front window of Tootsie's Orchid Lounge, a club in a dilapidated strip known as Lower Broadway. It was there he met singer/songwriter Gary Bennett, who was playing at a western store/tavern down the block called The Rhinestone, later to become Robert's Western Wear, then Robert's Western World. The two teamed up in April 1994 to form the nucleus of BR5-49. They played Wednesday - Saturday nights at Robert's, and were joined by drummer Shaw Wilson later that year, along with bassist Bones Becker and Mark Ude (known as Tex Austin) on saxophone. The band had no name until a truck driver who was a Robert's regular gave them $50 to buy posters to advertise their shows. They came up with the name BR5-49 after remembering a skit on the famous country music television show Hee Haw. BR5-49 became known for their non-stop four-hour-plus sets playing classic country, rockabilly, rock 'n' roll, and a slew of original material. As word spread of the entertaining, energetic band, crowds began packing Robert's.

In March 1995, Becker and Ute were replaced by "Smilin'" Jay McDowell (upright bass) and Don Herron (steel guitar, fiddle, and mandolin), solidifying the lineup. The buzz continued to grow, and lines formed around the block with people waiting to get inside. Suddenly, what had been a forgotten part of Nashville became the place to be. The attention brought to "Lower Broad" by BR5-49 spawned a renaissance for the neighborhood, which is now the top destination for Nashville's booming tourism industry.

During Fan Fair (now known as CMA Music Fest) 1995, Billboard magazine editor Timothy White saw the band play, and vowed to "put them on the cover" of the publication, which, in fact, he did. As a result, the band signed a record deal the next month with Arista Records in Nashville. After releasing an EP ("Live From Robert's"), their self-titled debut record came out in September 1996. Between 1996 and 2001, the band recorded and released five albums—four for Arista, and one for Sony's Lucky Dog imprint—and toured worldwide at festivals, clubs, and theaters. The group was nominated for a Grammy Award three times (1996, 1997, and 1999) and won the Country Music Association Award for International Touring Act of The Year in 1997.

== Solo work ==
In 2009, Mead released his first solo album, Journeyman's Wager, produced by Ray Kennedy, on his own Grassy Knoll Records label.

Back At The Quonset Hut, released in 2011 on Ramseur Records, is a collection of classic country and rockabilly songs recorded at the newly revitalized "Quonset Hut" studio on Nashville's Music Row. That record also included a short documentary film about the studio.

2014 saw the release of Free State Serenade on the newly formed Plowboy Records. A quasi-conceptual work, the songs on the record are an homage to Mead's home state of Kansas.

In 2019, Mead released Close to Home, an album he recorded in Memphis. According to Rolling Stone, the album's title track mixes "a groove that's part T. Rex stomp and part outlaw country swagger".

In 2020, in the midst of the COVID-19 pandemic, Mead wrote and recorded "I Ain't Been Nowhere", a parody based upon the Hank Snow song "I've Been Everywhere" made famous by Johnny Cash. The original song features a list of different cities sung rapid-fire; Mead changed it to locations within the confines of his own home.

== Producer ==
In 2002 and 2003, Mead teamed up with longtime Nashville studio musician Dave Roe to produce tribute records to Johnny Cash (Dressed in Black: A Tribute to Johnny Cash) and Waylon Jennings (Lonesome, On'ry and Mean) for the Dualtone record label, featuring artists such as Guy Clark, Raul Malo, Carlene Carter, Norah Jones, John Doe and many others. He has also co-produced Back At The Quonset Hut with Michael Janas and Free State Serenade with Joe Pisapia.

== Musical theater ==
Since 2006, Mead has served as the Musical Supervisor/Director for the Tony Award-winning Broadway musical Million Dollar Quartet. In this capacity he crafted the musical arrangements for the Chicago, Broadway, West End, and Broadway Across America national tour productions.

== Television ==
In 2016, Mead produced and supervised the music for the CMT television program Sun Records.
