= Conmemorativo: A Tribute to Gram Parsons =

Album of covers of Gram Parsons' songs released in 1993

Conmemorativo: A Tribute to Gram Parsons is an album of covers of singer-songwriter Gram Parsons' songs released by Rhino in 1993. It features 17 tracks recorded by artists from the indie rock and Americana music scenes of the time, including Uncle Tupelo, Vic Chesnutt, Bob Mould, Victoria Williams, and The Mekons.

== Track listing ==
No.	Title	Artist(s)	Length
1.	"Christine's Tune"	Steve Wynn	2:55
2.	"Cody, Cody"	Musical Kings	02:47
3.	"The New Soft Shoe"	Polly Parsons and Eden	4:36
4.	"November Nights"	The Coal Porters	2:57
5.	"Sin City"	Clive Gregson and Boo Hewerdine	5:05
6.	"Brass Buttons"	Something Happens	3:06
7.	"Big Mouth Blues"	Wellsprings of Hope	4:00
8.	"Hot Burrito #2"	Pet Clarke	4:15
9.	"Blue Eyes"	Uncle Tupelo	2:58
10.	"One Hundred Years From Now"	Stephen McCarthy	2:51
11.	"Do You Know How It Feels (To Be Lonesome)"	Carla Olson	3:41
12.	"A Song for You"	Susan Cowsill, Peter Holsapple and The Walkin' Tacos	4:55
13.	"Still Feeling Blue"	Finger	3:39
14.	"Hickory Wind"	Vic Chesnutt and Bob Mould	3:01
15.	"Return of the Grievous Angel"	Joey Burns and Victoria Williams	4:34
16.	"Juanita"	Flor De Mal	3:51
17.	"$1,000 Wedding"	The Mekons	4:05
Total length:			1:03:16
