= BR549 =

American country rock band

- Origin: Nashville, Tennessee, United States
- Genres: Alternative country; rockabilly; country rock
- Years active: 1993–2006, 2012–2013
- Labels: Arista Nashville, Lucky Dog, Dualtone
- Past members: Gary Bennett; Geoff Firebaugh; Don Herron "Smilin'" Jay McDowell; Chuck Mead; Mark Miller; Chris Scruggs; Jim "Bones" Becker; Mark Ude "Hawk" Shaw Wilson

BR549 (originally spelled BR5-49) was an American country rock band founded in 1993. It originally consisted of Gary Bennett (lead and background vocals, acoustic guitar), Don Herron (steel guitar, resonator guitar, fiddle, mandolin, acoustic guitar), "Smilin'" Jay McDowell (upright bass), Chuck Mead (lead and background vocals, acoustic guitar, electric guitar), and "Hawk" Shaw Wilson (drums, background vocals). Bennett and McDowell left the band in 2001, with Chris Scruggs and Geoff Firebaugh, respectively, replacing them. Both Firebaugh and Scruggs later left the band, as well; Mark Miller has become the band's third bassist. The name of the band is taken from a mangled phone number from Hee Haw comedian Junior Samples' car-salesman skit.

BR549 released six albums and two EPs, including three albums on Arista Nashville and two on Dualtone Records. The band's self-titled debut album produced three singles on the Billboard country charts in 1996. The band was nominated three times for the Grammy Award for Best Country Performance by a Duo or Group with Vocal, in 1996 ("Cherokee Boogie"), 1997 ("Wild One"), and 1999 ("Honky Tonk Song"). They also received a nomination for the Top New Vocal Duo or Group award from the Academy of Country Music Awards in 1997.

== History ==
Before moving to Nashville and forming BR5-49, Chuck Mead played in a band called Homestead Grays, a roots-rock outfit based in his hometown of Lawrence, Kansas. Gary Bennett, meanwhile, fronted an informal band that played at Robert's Western World, a Broadway bar in Nashville, Tennessee, when he met Mead at a nearby bar. In 1993, the two formed a band, and completing the lineup were electric bassist Jim "Bones" Becker, then upright bassist "Smilin'" Jay McDowell (formerly of another band called Hellbilly), multi-instrumentalist Don Herron, and drummer "Hawk" Shaw Wilson. They assumed the name BR5-49 (from the telephone number of a used-car dealer in a running Junior Samples comedy sketch on the television series Hee Haw), and began playing several nights a week for tips at Robert's.

=== 1995–2000: Arista Nashville ===
They were signed by Arista Nashville in September 1995. The band's first release for the label was an extended play entitled Live at Robert's, which comprised originals and cover songs. Following it in 1996 was their full-length debut album, also titled BR5-49. Despite minimal support from country radio, the album's lead-off single "Cherokee Boogie" (a cover of a Moon Mullican song) reached number 44 on the Billboard country singles charts in the US, and number 21 on the RPM country charts in Canada. Following this song were "Even If It's Wrong" and "Little Ramona (Gone Hillbilly Nuts)", which respectively reached numbers 68 and 61 in the US. The album itself was a number 33 on the Top Country Albums chart. The band also toured with the Mavericks, Junior Brown, and the Black Crowes and played on the PBS music program Austin City Limits in 1997. According to the All Music Guide to Country, BR5-49's recording of "Honky Tonk Song" on the BR5-49 album should be considered an essential country song, although it considers neither the album itself nor the group essential.

BR5-49's second album, Big Backyard Beat Show, was released in 1998. Despite not producing a chart single, this album reached number 38 on the Top Country Albums chart. After touring with Brian Setzer, the band issued a live album, Coast to Coast, in 1999 on Arista, as well. The band left Arista in 2000 after the label was merged with Sony BMG.

=== 2001–present ===
After being dropped from Arista, they signed to Lucky Dog Records, a subsidiary of Epic Records. Their first release for the label, 2001's This Is BR549, also eliminated the hyphen from the band's name. Its only single, "Too Lazy to Work, Too Nervous to Steal", peaked at number 11 on Country Singles sales, but did not enter the country singles charts proper. After this album, both Bennett and McDowell left the band, with Geoff Firebaugh succeeding McDowell as upright bassist, and Chris Scruggs taking over on guitar and vocals. The new lineup made its first appearance in 2003 on their self-released album Temporarily Disconnected. In 2004, they signed with Dualtone Records and released Tangled in the Pines. Scruggs left the band to tour solo in 2005. Firebaugh also left to start his own band, Hillbilly Casino. Mark Miller replaced Firebaugh. A second album for Dualtone, Dog Days, was released in early 2006.

Since 2013, the band has been on hiatus, with Chuck Mead working solo with Mark Miller playing bass, and Don Herron touring with Bob Dylan. On July 12, 2012, Jay McDowell announced on his personal Facebook page that the original line-up of BR5-49 would open for Old Crow Medicine Show at Woods Amphitheater in Nashville on July 28. On July 27, 2012, the (reunited) original lineup recorded an original Gary Bennett song called "A Truck Stop Christmas" at the East Nashville Studio of Phil Harris', which was released on the 2012 Christmas compilation An East Nashville Christmas. On May 9, 2013, the original lineup was announced to be playing together live once again, this time at the Havelock Country Jamboree in Canada on August 17, 2013.

== Status of former members ==
Original co-frontman Gary Bennett released his solo debut, Human Condition, in February 2006. In October 2010, Raucous Records released Bennett's follow-up album, My Ol' Guitar, co-produced by Kenny Vaughan and including several BR549 re-recordings.

Smilin' Jay McDowell has gone on to work in postproduction in the music video world. He was in charge of the video department for the Musicians Hall of Fame and Museum in Nashville. He directed a DVD project for Gary Bennett titled Inside and Out.

Former bassist Geoff Firebaugh founded a rockabilly band named Hillbilly Casino that is a crowd favorite in downtown Nashville on lower Broadway.

Chris Scruggs released a solo album titled Anthem in 2009. As of 2015, he is the bassist and multi-instrumentalist in Marty Stuart’s backing band, the Fabulous Superlatives.

Chuck Mead released Journeyman's Wager in 2009 and toured with his Grassy Knoll Boys in support of the release; this was followed by the classic-country covers album Back at the Quonset Hut in 2012 and Free State Serenade in 2014. In 2006, Chuck began his association with the hit Broadway Musical Million Dollar Quartet beginning in Florida as the Musical Arranger and Musical Director; he has also worked with the cast at The Village Theatre near Seattle, Washington, The Goodman Theatre in Chicago and The Nederlander Theatre on Broadway in New York City. He is currently working with the new cast in England as they prepare to open at The Noël Coward Theatre in City of Westminster.

Mark Miller was a founding member of the Ex-Husbands, formed in New York City in 1993 with lead singer Anders Thomsen and drummer Michael Smith. The band released two critically acclaimed albums on Tar Hut Records – a self-titled debut and the follow-up, All Gussied Up. Both made the Gavin Americana top 20 and the latter reached that chart's top 10. Miller released the solo record Dodsen Chapel in 2005.

Original bass picker Jim "Bones" Becker has now retired.

== Musical style and influences ==
According to Trouser Press, while alternative country bands typically try to emulate the sound of prerock and roll-era country music, BR549's sound draws from postrock and roll styles, "when honky tonk, rockabilly, Western swing, bittersweet storyteller swill, and Sheb Wooley all commingled in search of proper homes in the evolving country landscape." BR549's sound encompasses alternative country, Western swing, Bakersfield sound, rockabilly and country rock. According to Trouser Press, the band "poised themselves as authentic defenders of the faith, but a name taken from a recurring Hee Haw skit and a predilection for campy vintage clothing threatened to make them alt-country’s answer to Sha Na Na." Steve Huey of AllMusic described their sound and appearance as "unabashedly retro", as the band's members dressed in "old, budget-friendly clothes".

== Members ==
- Chuck Mead – guitar, vocals
- Gary Bennett – guitar, vocals
- Shaw Wilson – drums, backing vocals
- Don Herron – fiddle, steel guitar, mandolin, Dobro, banjo
- Smilin' Jay McDowell – upright bass

=== Former members ===
- "Bones" Jim Becker – electric bass
- "Buggs" Tex Austin (Mark Ude) – saxophone
- Chris Scruggs – guitar, vocals
- Geoff Firebaugh – upright bass
- Mark Miller – upright bass, vocals

== Discography ==
=== Albums ===
Title	Album details	Peak chart positions		
Title	Album details	US Country	US Heat	CAN Country
BR5-49	Release date: September 17, 1996; Label: Arista Nashville; Formats: CD, cassette	33	11	12
Big Backyard Beat Show	Release date: July 14, 1998; Label: Arista Nashville; Formats: CD, cassette	38	23	—
Coast to Coast	Release date: April 4, 2000; Label: Arista Nashville; Formats: CD, cassette	46	—	—
This Is BR549	Release date: June 26, 2001; Label: Lucky Dog; Formats: CD, cassette	54	—	—
Tangled in the Pines	Release date: March 9, 2004; Label: Dualtone Records; Formats: CD	58	—	—
Dog Days	Release date: January 10, 2006; Label: Dualtone Records; Formats: CD	—	—	—
"—" denotes releases that did not chart

=== Extended plays ===
Title	Album details
Live from Robert's	Release date: April 30, 1996; Label: Arista Nashville; Formats: CD, cassette, 12"
Bonus Beats	Release date: July 14, 1998; Label: Arista Nashville; Formats: CD
Temporarily Disconnected	Release date: 2003; Label: Self-released; Formats: CD

=== Singles ===
Year	Single	Peak chart positions		Album
Year	Single	US Country	CAN Country	Album
1996	"Cherokee Boogie"	44	21	BR5-49
1997	"Even if it's Wrong"	68	66	BR5-49
1997	"Little Ramona (Gone Hillbilly Nuts)"	61	77	BR5-49
1998	"Wild One"	—	—	Big Backyard Beat Show
2001	"Too Lazy to Work, Too Nervous to Steal"	—	—	This Is BR549
2004	"That's What I Get"	—	—	Tangled in the Pines
2004	"Way Too Late (To Go Home Early Now)"	—	—	Tangled in the Pines
2005	"After the Hurricane"	—	—	Dog Days
"—" denotes releases that did not chart

=== Music videos ===
Year	Video	Director
1996	"Cherokee Boogie"	Michael McNamara
1997	"Even If It's Wrong"	Michael McNamara
1998	"Wild One"	Neil J. Colligan
2001	"Too Lazy to Work, Too Nervous to Steal"	Neil Lisk
2004	"No Train to Memphis"	
2004	"That's What I Get"	Jay McDowell

== Awards and nominations ==
=== Grammy Awards ===
Year	Nominee / work	Award	Result
1997	"Cherokee Boogie"	Best Country Performance by a Duo or Group with Vocal	Nominated
1999	"Wild One"	Best Country Performance by a Duo or Group with Vocal	Nominated
2000	"Honky Tonk Song"	Best Country Performance by a Duo or Group with Vocal	Nominated

=== Academy of Country Music Awards ===
Year	Nominee / work	Award	Result
1997	BR5-49	Top New Vocal Group or Duet	Nominated

=== Country Music Association Awards ===
Year	Nominee / work	Award	Result
1996	BR5-49	International Touring Artist	Won
