= Robert's Western World =

Bar and country music venue in Nashville, Tennessee

Coordinates: 36°9′39″N 86°46′41″W

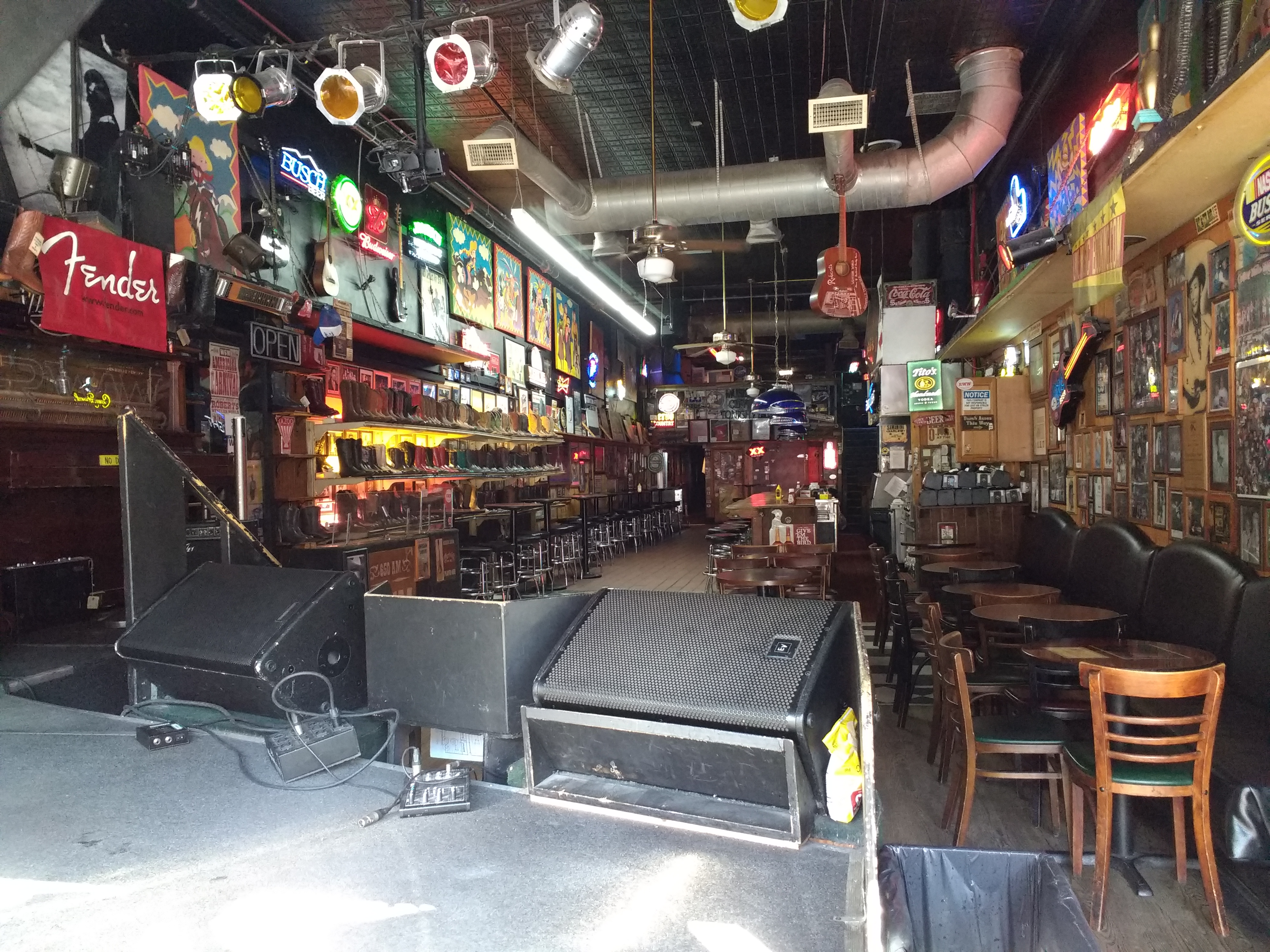
Interior

Robert's Western World is a honky-tonk located on lower Broadway in Nashville, Tennessee.

Robert's Western World continues to host local and up-and-coming country music talent. The band BR549 which gained local and national press from its four-hour nightly gig at Robert's Western World went on to open for country singers George Strait, Faith Hill and Tim McGraw. Despite this, the band never greatly appealed to a mainstream country audience. However, BR549 released an album in 1996 titled Live From Robert's which was a compilation of original work as well as cover songs recorded in Robert's Western World.

On October 15, 2010, Robert's Western World hosted the "Bluegrass on Broadway" presented by C. F. Martin & Company, which started off the annual International Bluegrass Music Association in Nashville. This event showcases bluegrass music and its artists to the public.

== History ==
The building that houses Robert's Western World was used as a warehouse, office space for river merchants, and a variety of other purposes until the late 1950s. Steel guitar players Shot Jackson and Buddy Emmons bought the venue and named it Sho-Bud Steel Guitar Company. The steel guitar shop manufactured and sold steel guitars and other musical instruments until the early 1980s. When lower Broadway hit on hard times in the early 1980s, the building was converted to a liquor store until the early 1990s when Robert Moore bought and converted it into a western apparel store named Robert's Rhinestone Western Wear. After the lower Broadway area rebounded, Mr. Moore added live entertainment, food, and beer. The menu is famous for its "recession special," featuring a fried bologna sandwich, a bag of Lay's potato chips, a moon pie, and a Pabst Blue Ribbon for $6.

In 1999, Jesse Lee Jones bought Robert's from Robert Moore as dedication to preserve the title "the home of traditional country music" on lower Broadway. Emily Ann Jones, spouse of JesseLee Jones runs Robert’s Western World as the GM. JesseLee and Emily Ann Jones are both singers and musicians, with JesseLee having the longest running house band on lower Broadway, Nashville, “Brazilbilly”, which has been playing for over 30 years at Robert’s Western World.
