= Hickory Wind =

Song by The Byrds

from the album Sweetheart of the Rodeo
- Released: August 30, 1968
- Recorded: March 9, 1968
- Studio: Columbia (Nashville, Tennessee)
- Genre: Country
- Length: 3:31
- Label: Columbia
- Songwriters: Gram Parsons, Bob Buchanan
- Producer: Gary Usher

Audio sample
- "Hickory Wind": file; help

"Hickory Wind" is a song written by country rock artist Gram Parsons and former International Submarine Band member Bob Buchanan. The song was written on a train ride the pair took from Florida to Los Angeles in early 1968, and first appeared on The Byrds' Sweetheart of the Rodeo album. Despite Buchanan's input, "Hickory Wind" is generally considered to be Parsons' signature song. Parsons' decision to play "Hickory Wind" instead of the planned Merle Haggard cover "Life in Prison" during The Byrds' performance at the Grand Ole Opry on March 15, 1968 "pissed off the country music establishment" and stunned Opry regulars to such an extent that the song is now considered essential to Parsons' legend.

Johnny Rogan, in his book The Byrds: Timeless Flight Revisited, offers the following interpretation for the song: "The alluring 'Hickory Wind' serves as a powerful image for Parsons' bittersweet nostalgia, as he imagines an Edenic childhood of simple pleasures like climbing trees. During successive verses, he reflects on the pursuit of fame, the curse of wealth without spiritual satisfaction, and the perils of city life. What really makes the song, however, is Parsons' aching vocal performance, set against a superb steel guitar backing, whose whining combines with his yearning voice to create a mood of unbearable poignancy." Chris Hillman, Parsons' partner in The Byrds and later The Flying Burrito Brothers, offers the following interpretation of the song:

It's his [Parsons'] signature song, just as 'I'll Feel a Whole Lot Better' is Gene Clark's signature song. If Gram had never written another song, "Hickory Wind" would have put him on the map. The song says it all – it's very descriptive, with vivid imagery. It's actually quite literary, but Gram was, we know, was a very bright kid. If you know the guy's life story, however he conjured up that scenario – it's right at home. Gram was shuffled off to a prep school, lots of money... that's a lonely song. He was a lonely kid.

Parsons first recorded "Hickory Wind" with The Byrds on March 9, 1968, at Columbia Records' Nashville recording studios during sessions for the Sweetheart of the Rodeo album. The song features the noted session musicians Lloyd Green on pedal steel guitar and John Hartford on fiddle. In addition, Parsons plays acoustic guitar and piano, with bass, banjo and drums being played by Chris Hillman, Roger McGuinn and Kevin Kelley respectively. Although the song is often regarded as one of the best of Parsons' career, it was not released as a single. The song was re-recorded for Parsons' 1974 album, Grievous Angel, as part of the "Medley Live from Northern Quebec", along with the song "Cash on the Barrelhead".

== Covers ==
"Hickory Wind" was covered by Joan Baez on her 1969 release, David's Album. Parsons' friend and one-time musical partner Emmylou Harris also covered it on her 1979 album Blue Kentucky Girl. Richard Thompson, Clive Gregson, and Christine Collister also recorded a cover of the song for the 1989 Byrds' tribute album, Time Between – A Tribute to The Byrds. Grant Lee Phillips recorded his cover version for his Virginia Creeper album. The Seldom Scene covered "Hickory Wind" on the live album Blue Grass: The Greatest Show On Earth recorded at a concert in 1980 and released in 1986 with members of The Country Gentlemen and J. D. Crowe and the New South. Vic Chesnutt and Bob Mould covered it for the Gram Parsons 1993 tribute album Conmemorativo: A Tribute to Gram Parsons. Ryan Adams & the Cardinals covered the song numerous times in concert. Lucinda Williams has covered the song twice: once on Cayamo: Sessions at Sea, an album by Buddy Miller, and again on a tribute album to Harris entitled: The Life & Songs of Emmylou Harris. BR5-49 recorded the song on their 1996 self-titled album. Hickory Wind was also covered by The Tuttles with AJ Lee on the album titled Endless Ocean, (2013).
