= Polly Parsons (producer) =

American producer and entrepreneur (b. 1967)

- Born: 1967 (age 58–59)
- Occupations: Producer, Entrepreneur
- Years active: 2003–present
- Children: 1
- Website: www.pollyparsons.com

Polly Parsons (born 1967) is an American producer and entrepreneur. She is the daughter of singer-songwriter Gram Parsons and Nancy Ross.

== Gram Parsons legacy ==
=== 2003 Americana Music Awards ===
Parsons made her first documented appearance in 2003, accepting the President's Award on behalf of the late Gram Parsons at the Americana Music Awards ceremony in Nashville.

=== 2004: "Return to Sin City: A Tribute to Gram Parsons" ===
In 2004, she directed and produced two live tribute concerts titled "Return to Sin City: A Tribute to Gram Parsons". Artists included: Keith Richards, James Burton, Lucinda Williams, Norah Jones, Dwight Yoakam, John Doe, Steve Earle, Jim Lauderdale, Kathleen Edwards, Jay Farrar, Jim James, Raul Malo, Susan Marshall, and the Sin City All Stars. A concert DVD was produced.

=== Gram Parsons Foundation ===
100% of the proceeds from the tribute concerts were donated through the newly formed Gram Parsons Foundation to the Musicians Assistance Program (now MusiCares Foundation) which aids musicians in crisis.

Parsons would go on to relaunch the Gram Parsons Foundation in 2012 to support musicians and artists worldwide with addiction and recovery services by hosting a launch event at SXSW on March 14, 2012. The event featured performances by Brendan Benson, Eric Burdon, Blitzen Trapper, Alberta Cross, Great Lake Swimmers, Jenny O, and Poor Man (Christian Wargo and Casey Wescott from Fleet Foxes).

=== 2022-2023: "The Last Roundup: Live from The Bijou Café in Philadelphia" ===
Dave Prinz, a co-founder of Amoeba Music, was a collector of Gram Parsons archival material. During a move of the L.A. Amoeba record store, Prinz rediscovered a series of Gram Parsons "Last Roundup" tapes. With no interest in involving a bigger record company, Prinz decided to initiate a Kickstarter campaign to fund the release independently, in partnership with Polly Parsons. The campaign launched on November 17, 2022, and was fully backed.

Gram Parsons & The Fallen Angels' "The Last Roundup: Live from The Bijou Café in Philadelphia 3/16/73" featuring Emmylou Harris was released on Friday, November 24, 2023, and was considered one of the Record Store Day (RSD) hits of 2023.

=== 2023: Grammy Museum panel: "Celebrating Gram Parsons, Amoeba Music, and RSD Black Friday" ===
On November 15, 2023, the Grammy Museum hosted a panel titled "Celebrating Gram Parsons, Amoeba Music, and RSD Black Friday". The commemorative panel was moderated by Variety's chief music critic Chris Willman, and featured Polly Parsons and Amoeba Music co-founder David Prinz, and detailed the discovery of a never-before-heard 1973 recording.

The panel concluded with a performance from Sierra Ferrell, who paid homage to Parsons with renditions of "She," "Return of the Grievous Angel" and "Streets of Baltimore."

== Entrepreneur ==
=== Sound As Ever ===
In 2021, Polly Parsons launched a desert- and community-inspired goods and Gram Parsons merchandise brand called Sound As Ever with two partners. Self-described as "fine goods for the mindful", the products have a distinctive boho, Joshua Tree aesthetic.

== Producer ==
=== Daddy Van Productions ===
Parsons co-founded and is the former managing partner of Daddy Van Productions, producing video content design for live events and world tours. They produced tours for Bruce Springsteen and Maroon 5 among others as well as producing with major companies like Nike and Warner Brothers.

=== Taking the Jesus Pill ===
Parsons adapted and then produced the multimedia rock opera Taking the Jesus Pill. The play ran through 2006 and an album of the music was produced.

=== Take Another Little Piece of My Heart ===
Polly Parsons directed and produced the Pamela Des Barres one-woman show Take Another Little Piece of My Heart. The event took place at Whisky a Go Go on March 17, 2024.

== Advocacy for artist addiction and recovery ==
Through Gram Parsons tribute concerts, Parsons raised funds for a series of organizations that support artist and musician addiction and recovery services including Gram Parsons Foundation, Musician's Assistance Program (now MusiCares Foundation), and SIMS Foundation.

=== Hickory Wind Ranch sober living facility ===
In 2009, Polly Parsons opened Hickory Wind Ranch, a sober-living environment for women in entertainment and the arts who are in recovery from substance abuse. It was the first holistic sober living environment in Austin, Texas, for musicians and artists. The program has expanded to include substance-abuse treatment and programs for men and teens.
