= Grievous Angel =

Studio album by Gram Parsons
- Released: January 1974
- Recorded: Summer 1973
- Studios: Wally Heider Studio 4 (Hollywood); Capitol (Hollywood)
- Genres: Country, country rock
- Length: 36:14
- Label: Reprise
- Producer: Gram Parsons

Gram Parsons chronology
GP (1973)	Grievous Angel (1974)	Sleepless Nights (1976)

Singles from Grievous Angel
- 1. "Love Hurts" Released: February 1974; 2. "Return of the Grievous Angel" Released: February 1982

Professional ratings
Review scores
Source	Rating
AllMusic	5/5 stars
Christgau's Record Guide	A
Encyclopedia of Popular Music	5/5 stars
Rolling Stone	(favorable)
Tom Hull	A−

Grievous Angel is the second and final solo studio album by Gram Parsons, compiled from summer 1973 sessions and released four months after his death from a morphine and alcohol overdose in September 1973. Prominently featuring a young Emmylou Harris, Grievous Angel received great critical acclaim upon release but failed to find commercial success, a fate shared with Parsons’ previous efforts solo and with The Flying Burrito Brothers. Grievous Angel peaked at number 195 on the Billboard charts. Despite its modest sales, it is viewed as a successful example of the hybrid between country and rock and roll Parsons called "Cosmic American Music".

It was voted number 324 in the third edition of Colin Larkin's All Time Top 1000 Albums (2000). In 2012, the album was ranked number 425 on Rolling Stone magazine's list of the 500 greatest albums of all time.

== Background ==
After a ramshackle tour in the spring and summer of 1973, Gram Parsons again convened with his singing partner Emmylou Harris, various members of Elvis Presley's "Taking Care of Business" band, including James Burton and Glen Hardin and the occasional guest (such as Bernie Leadon and Linda Ronstadt) to record his second solo album for Reprise Records. Unlike his previous album GP, Grievous Angel was a planned affair with several arrangements having been worked out on the road.

== Recording and composition ==
The sessions for Grievous Angel took place at Wally Heider Studio 4 in Hollywood with Parsons producing. In a 2013 Uncut cover story about Parsons' solo work, acoustic guitarist Herb Pedersen recalls to David Cavanagh that when the singer showed up he was a mess: "He came in late. Emmy brought him to the studio. She was kind of minding him. We'd already tracked four or five tunes, and he was not in any kind of shape to record with us. He was generally out of it for the most part."

Parsons, who was battling heroin addiction and alcoholism, would rally, however, with bassist Emory Gordy recalling in David N. Meyers' 2007 Parsons biography Twenty Thousand Roads, "Gram played us each of the songs that he had ready...We took it from there. It was loose as far as formal arranging was concerned – we played what we thought was right for the song, and it all seemed to fall together...He was in good shape, Gram. There was a lot of energy going on in the studio for the whole of that album. Gram was bouncing all over the place and Emmy was bouncing around him. They were great, happy sessions."

In the 2004 documentary Fallen Angel, however, manager Phil Kaufman claims Parsons was still drinking like he had been during the recording of GP, "but not as bad. He was hiding what he was doing. In other words, before he was more blatant in his drinking and his drugs."

Lacking much-needed new material, Parsons quickly wrote two songs during the sessions ("Return of the Grievous Angel", with lyrics by Boston-based poet and Parsons fan Thomas Brown, and "In My Hour Of Darkness", arranged by Harris) and looked to songs rejected from previous albums and to standard country songs to fill out the LP. In regards to the original material, "Brass Buttons" dated from Parsons' brief stint as a Harvard-based folksinger in the mid-1960s; "Hickory Wind" had already been recorded with The Byrds; "$1000 Wedding", about Parsons' aborted plan to wed the mother of his daughter in ostentatious style, had been recorded with the Flying Burrito Brothers circa 1970; "Ooh Las Vegas" had been rejected from GP. "Medley Live from Northern Quebec" is a fake live recording featuring canned applause and ersatz concert ambiance which combines the Louvin Brothers's "Cash on the Barrelhead" with his own "Hickory Wind". Writing in Twenty Thousand Roads, David Meyers praises Harris' increased role on the album, noting that the duet "Love Hurts" contains "a lovely high whine, a mourning, keening reach for the suffering in the song. Neither overdoes it – they feel the pain, they show it to us, they make us feel every bit, but never go too far. Their sustain on the final 'love hurts' demonstrates how far they'd come together in emotion and technique."

In spite of the dearth of new material, the album expanded the format of "Cosmic American Music". After mixing the album at Capitol Studios in Hollywood, Parsons set off for Joshua Tree, California, where he would fatally overdose on September 19, 1973, officially declared deceased in nearby Yucca Valley.

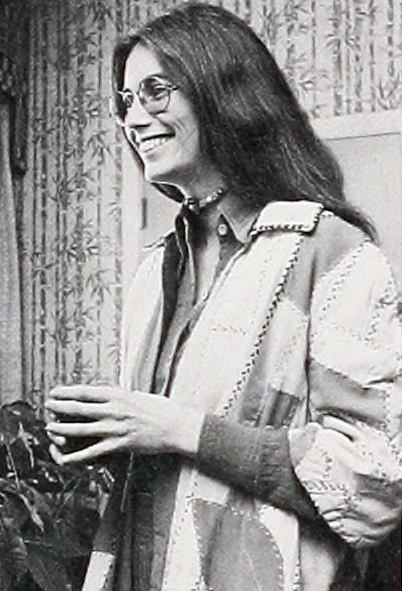
Harris in 1976

== Posthumous changes ==
Parsons' widow, Gretchen, who had never cared for Harris' relationship with her husband, removed Harris from the front cover of the album (which was originally credited to "Gram Parsons with Emmylou Harris" and featured a photograph of the two of them) and relegated her to a credit on the back cover. Additionally, she removed the original title track, "Sleepless Nights", and replaced the cover with an image of Parsons in a sea of blue. The rearranged album was released in January 1974. The three tracks recorded during the sessions that had gone unreleased, "Sleepless Nights", "The Angels Rejoiced in Heaven Last Night", and "Brand New Heartache", were released on the posthumous 1976 Parsons/Flying Burrito Brothers album Sleepless Nights.

== Reception ==
Grievous Angel was released in January 1974 and peaked at a disappointing 195 on the Billboard 200. Critically however, the album received much interest and was deemed an artistic triumph. Allan Jones of Melody Maker wrote, "Both GP and Grievous Angel need no analysis. There are no words to describe the sense of desperation and the haunting quality of these last works. They just need to be listened to." Tom Russell of Helix concurred, writing, "His influence on bringing country music to rock and roll is as important as Bob Dylan's combining folk lyrics with rock." Mark Deming of AllMusic writes that the LP "may not have been the finest work of his career, but one would be hard pressed to name an artist who made an album this strong only a few weeks before their death – or at any time of their life, for that matter." When Uncut compiled Parsons' "20 Greatest Tracks" in their February 2013 issue, the top three – "Hickory Wind," "Brass Buttons," and "$1000 Wedding," all appear on Grievous Angel.

== Track listing ==
Side one
No.	Title	Writer(s)	Length
1.	"Return of the Grievous Angel"	Gram Parsons, Tom Brown	4:19
2.	"Hearts on Fire"	Walter Egan, Tom Guidera	3:50
3.	"I Can't Dance"	Tom T. Hall	2:20
4.	"Brass Buttons"	Parsons	3:27
5.	"$1000 Wedding"	Parsons	5:00

Side two
No.	Title	Writer(s)	Length
1.	"Medley Live from Northern Quebec": "Cash on the Barrelhead"; "Hickory Wind"	Charlie Louvin, Ira Louvin ("Cash on the Barrelhead"), Parsons, Bob Buchanan ("Hickory Wind")	6:27
2.	"Love Hurts"	Boudleaux Bryant	3:40
3.	"Ooh Las Vegas"	Parsons, Ric Grech	3:29
4.	"In My Hour of Darkness"	Parsons, Emmylou Harris	3:42

== Personnel ==
- Gram Parsons – lead vocals, acoustic guitar
- Emmylou Harris – vocals (all songs except "Brass Buttons")
- Glen D. Hardin – piano, electric piano on "Brass Buttons"
- James Burton – electric lead guitar
- Emory Gordy Jr. – bass
- Ron Tutt – drums
- Herb Pedersen – acoustic rhythm guitar, electric rhythm guitar on "I Can't Dance"
- Al Perkins – pedal steel

=== Guests ===
- Bernie Leadon – acoustic guitar on "Return of the Grievous Angel", electric lead guitar on "Hearts on Fire", dobro on "In My Hour of Darkness"
- Byron Berline – fiddle on "Return of the Grievous Angel", "Medley Live from Northern Quebec" & "In My Hour of Darkness", mandolin on "Medley"
- N.D. Smart – drums on "Hearts on Fire" and "In My Hour of Darkness"
- Steve Snyder – vibes on "Hearts on Fire"
- Linda Ronstadt – harmony vocal on "In My Hour of Darkness"
- Kim Fowley, Phil Kaufman, Ed Tickner, Jane & Jon Doe – "Background blah-blah" on "Medley Live from Northern Quebec"
