= Gram Parsons =

American singer-songwriter (1946–1973)

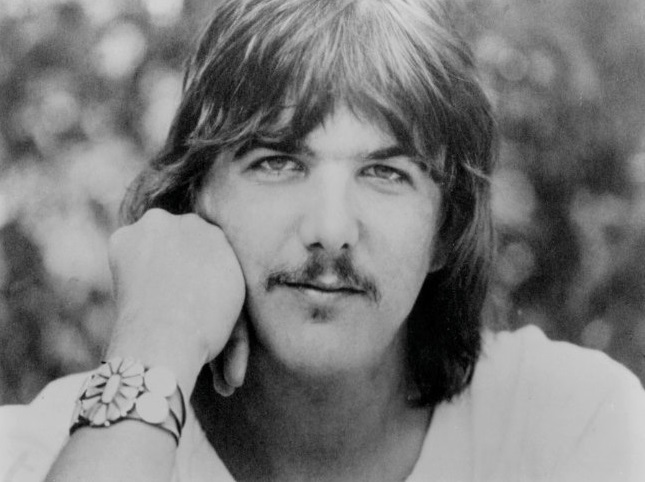
- Parsons in 1972
- Born: Ingram Cecil Connor III; November 5, 1946; Winter Haven, Florida, US
- Died: September 19, 1973 (aged 26); Joshua Tree, California, US
- Spouse: Gretchen Burrell (m. 1971; sep. 1973)
- Children: Polly Parsons
- Musical career
- Genres: Country rock; progressive country; folk rock; Americana
- Occupations: Singer-songwriter, musician
- Instruments: Vocals; guitar; keyboards
- Years active: 1963–1973
- Labels: Reprise; A&M
- Formerly of: International Submarine Band; The Byrds; The Flying Burrito Brothers

Ingram Cecil Connor III (November 5, 1946 – September 19, 1973), known professionally as Gram Parsons, was an American musician. He recorded with the International Submarine Band, the Byrds, and the Flying Burrito Brothers, popularizing what he called "Cosmic American Music", a hybrid of country, rhythm and blues, soul, folk, and rock. He has been credited with helping to found the country rock and alt-country genres and received a ranking of No. 87 on Rolling Stone magazine's list of the 100 Greatest Artists of All Time. Parsons was posthumously inducted into the Rock and Roll Hall of Fame in 2026 in the musical influence category.

== Early life and education ==
Ingram Cecil Connor III was born in Winter Haven, Florida, to Ingram Cecil Connor II, aka "Coon Dog", and Avis Snively Connor. He had one sibling, a sister. Connor II was a World War II flying ace, decorated with the Air Medal, who worked at his father-in-law's company and was a local Boy Scout official. Both parents were alcoholics and both suffered from depression; Cecil II shot and killed himself on December 23, 1958. Avis then married Robert Parsons, whose surname was adopted by Gram and his sister. Avis and Robert would have one child, Parsons's half-sister.

Avis was the daughter of citrus fruit magnate John A. Snively, who held extensive properties in Winter Haven, Florida and Waycross, Georgia, where the Connors normally lived. Parsons attended The Bolles School in Jacksonville before transferring to the public Winter Haven High School; after failing his junior year there, he returned to Bolles. On his graduation day, June 5, 1965, his mother died of complications from alcoholism. Robert Parsons had been having an affair with Gram's half-sister's nanny; they married shortly after Avis's death. Gram went on to Harvard University, which he attended for one semester. At age 21, he began to receive his annual trust fund income of $30,000 ($289,671 in 2025).

== Career ==
Parsons developed strong musical interests early in life, particularly after seeing Elvis Presley perform in concert in Waycross, on February 22, 1956. Five years later, he was playing in rock and roll cover bands such as the Pacers and the Legends, headlining in Winter Haven/Polk County clubs owned by his stepfather. By age 16, he had graduated to folk music, and in 1963 he teamed up with his first professional outfit, the Shilohs. Heavily influenced by The Kingston Trio and The Journeymen, the band played hootenannies, coffee houses and high school auditoriums; as Parsons was still enrolled in prep school, he performed with the group only in select engagements. Forays into New York City included a performance at Florida's exhibition in the 1964 New York World's Fair and regular appearances at the Café Rafio on Bleecker Street in Greenwich Village in the summer of 1964. Although John Phillips (an acquaintance of Shiloh George Wrigley) arranged an exploratory meeting with Albert Grossman, the impresario balked at booking the group for a Christmas engagement at The Bitter End when he discovered that the Shilohs were high school students. Following a recording session at the radio station of Bob Jones University, the group reached a creative impasse amid the emergence of folk rock and dissolved in the spring of 1965.

=== The International Submarine Band (1966–1967) ===
In 1966, he and other musicians from the Boston folk scene formed a group called the International Submarine Band. In 1967, after briefly residing in the Kingsbridge section of the Bronx, they moved to Los Angeles. Following several lineup changes, the band signed with Lee Hazlewood's LHI Records, where they spent late 1967 recording Safe at Home. The album contains one of Parsons' best-known songs, "Luxury Liner", and an early version of "Do You Know How It Feels," which he revised later in his career. Safe at Home would remain unreleased until mid-1968, by which time the International Submarine Band had broken up.

The International Submarine Band appeared in the Peter Fonda film The Trip (1967) as a performing band in one of the clubs. Their song "Lazy Days" was offered for the film's soundtrack, but the soundtrack was done by Mike Bloomfield's Electric Flag. In 1967, Peter Fonda recorded a version of Parsons' song "November Nights" titled "November Night". The song was released as a single in March 1967, with Donovan's "Catch the Wind" on the B side.

=== The Byrds (1968) ===
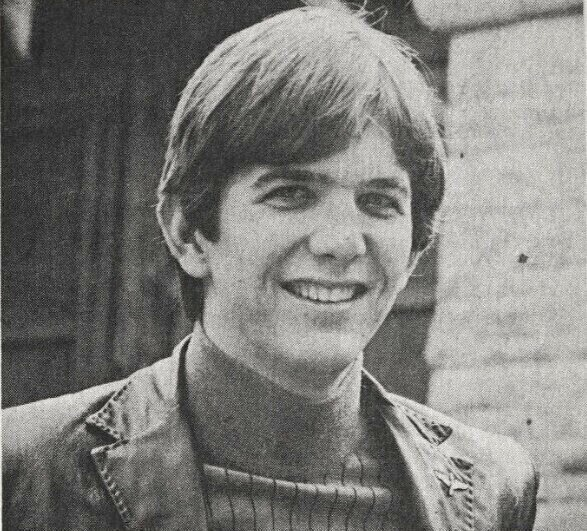
Parsons during his time with the Byrds, 1968

By 1968, Parsons came to the attention of The Byrds' bassist, Chris Hillman, via business manager Larry Spector, who was looking for a new band member following the departures of David Crosby and Michael Clarke. In February 1968, Parsons passed an audition for the band, being initially recruited as a jazz pianist but soon adding rhythm guitar and vocals.

Although Parsons was an equal contributor to the band, he was not regarded as a full member by the band's label, Columbia Records. Consequently, when the Byrds' recording contract was renewed on February 29, 1968, it was signed only by original members Roger McGuinn and Chris Hillman. Parsons, like fellow new recruit Kevin Kelley, was hired as a sideman and received a salary from McGuinn and Hillman. In later years, this led Hillman to state, "Gram was hired. He was not a member of the Byrds, ever. He was on salary; that was the only way we could get him to turn up." Parsons and Kelley were given equal billing alongside McGuinn and Hillman on the Sweetheart of the Rodeo album, and in press coverage. (Note: Reflecting on his time with the Byrds, Parsons said, "Being with The Byrds confused me a little. I couldn't find my place. I didn't have enough say-so. I really wasn't one of The Byrds. I was originally hired because they wanted a keyboard player. But I had experience being a frontman and that came out immediately. And [Roger McGuinn] being a very perceptive fellow saw that it would help the act, and he started sticking me out front.")

Sweetheart of the Rodeo was conceived by McGuinn as a double-album history of American popular music. It was to begin with bluegrass, then move through country and western, jazz, rhythm and blues, and rock music, before ending with electronic music. However, as recording plans were made, Parsons persuaded the other members to leave Los Angeles and record the album in Nashville. McGuinn's concept was jettisoned in favor of a country project, which included Parsons' songs "One Hundred Years from Now" and "Hickory Wind", and songs by Bob Dylan, Woody Guthrie and Merle Haggard.

Recording sessions for Sweetheart of the Rodeo commenced at Columbia Records' recording studios in the Music Row area of Nashville on March 9, 1968. Mid-way through, the sessions moved to Columbia Studios, Hollywood and were completed on May 27, 1968. However, Parsons was still under contract to LHI Records and Hazlewood threatened legal action over Parsons' appearance on the album. As a result, McGuinn replaced three of Parsons' lead vocals with his own; in 1973, in an interview with Cameron Crowe, Parsons said that McGuinn "erased it and did the vocals himself and fucked it up." Parsons remained as lead vocalist on the songs "You're Still on My Mind", "Life in Prison", and "Hickory Wind".

While in England with the Byrds in the summer of 1968, Parsons left the band over a planned concert tour of South Africa and his opposition to apartheid. During this period Parsons became acquainted with Mick Jagger and Keith Richards of The Rolling Stones. After leaving the band, Parsons stayed at Richards' house and the pair developed a close friendship, with Parsons reintroducing the guitarist to country music.

=== The Flying Burrito Brothers (1969–1970) ===
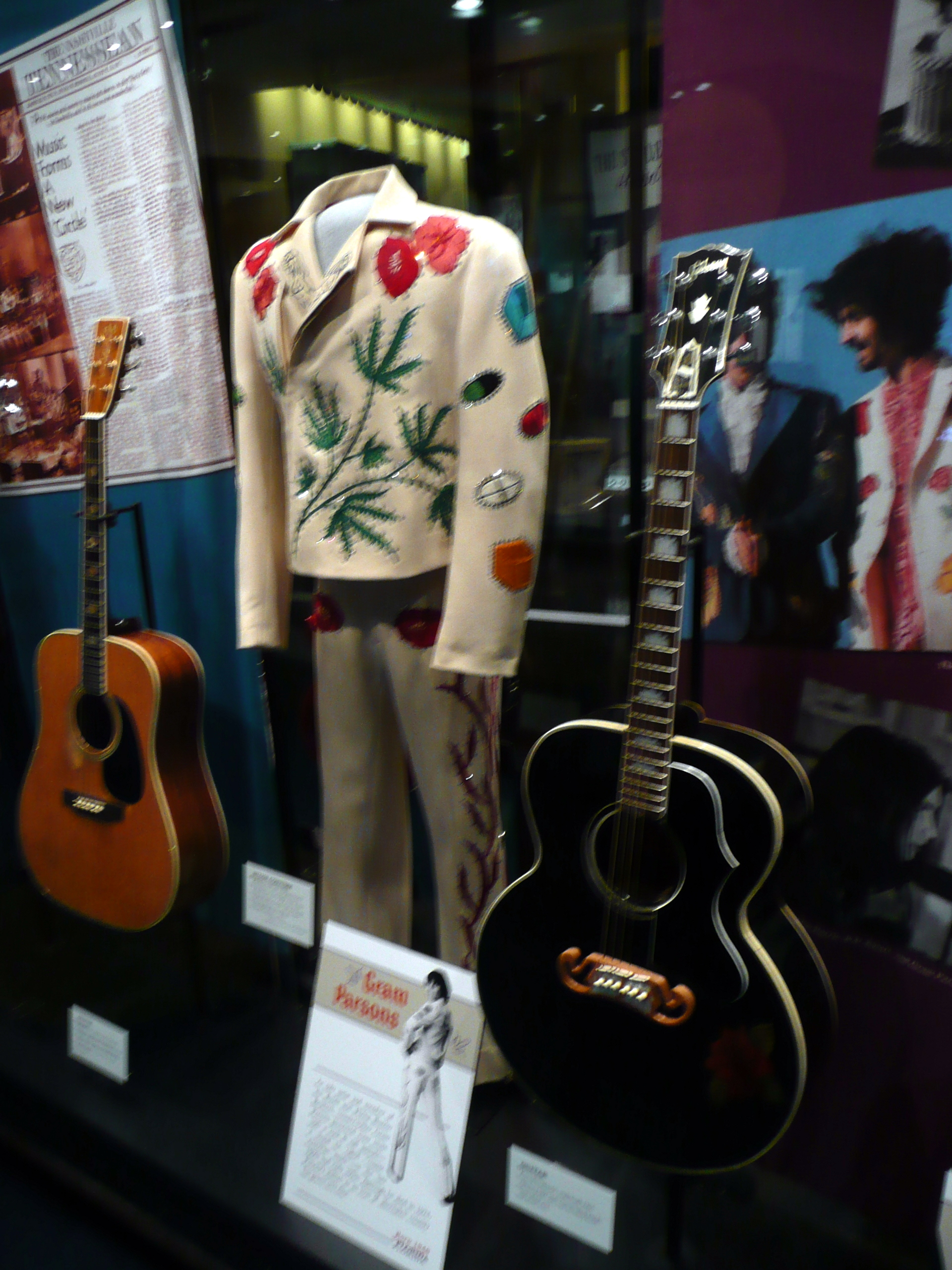
Parsons's Nudie suit in the Country Music Hall of Fame in Nashville

Returning to Los Angeles, Parsons sought out Chris Hillman, and the two formed The Flying Burrito Brothers with bassist Chris Ethridge and pedal steel player Sneaky Pete Kleinow. Their 1969 album The Gilded Palace of Sin marked the culmination of Parsons' post-1966 musical vision: a modernized variant of the Bakersfield sound that was popularized by Buck Owens amalgamated with strands of soul and psychedelic rock. The band appeared on the album cover wearing Nudie suits emblazoned with hippie symbols, including marijuana, Tuinal, and Seconal-inspired patches. Along with the Parsons-Hillman originals "Christine's Tune" and "Sin City" were versions of the soul music classics "The Dark End of the Street" and "Do Right Woman, Do Right Man", the latter featuring David Crosby on high harmony. The original songs were the result of a productive songwriting partnership between Parsons and Hillman, who were sharing a bachelor pad in the San Fernando Valley. The pronounced gospel-soul influence on this album likely evolved from the ecumenical tastes of bassist Chris Ethridge, who co-wrote "Hot Burrito No. 1/I'm Your Toy" and "Hot Burrito No. 2" with Parsons.

Original drummer Eddie Hoh was unable to perform adequate takes due to a substance abuse problem. He was dismissed after two songs and the band used session drummers, including former International Submarine Band drummer Jon Corneal and Popeye Phillips. Before commencing live performances, the group settled on original Byrds drummer Michael Clarke.

The Gilded Palace of Sin was commercially unsuccessful. Critic Robert Christgau called it "an ominous, obsessive, tongue-in-cheek country-rock synthesis, absorbing rural and urban, traditional and contemporary, at point of impact." Parsons suffered from fear of flying and the band toured via train. The band members lost most of their money in a perpetual poker game and their concerts were met with bewilderment. Parsons was taking psilocybin and cocaine, so his performances were erratic. The most successful appearance was in Philadelphia, where the group opened for the reconstituted Byrds. Midway through their set, Parsons joined the headline act and fronted his former group on renditions of "Hickory Wind" and "You Don't Miss Your Water".

After returning to Los Angeles, the group recorded "The Train Song", written during an increasingly infrequent songwriting session on the train and produced by 1950s R&B legends Larry Williams and Johnny "Guitar" Watson. Despite a request from the Burritos that the remnants of their publicity budget be diverted to the promotion of the single, it also flopped. During this period, Ethridge departed, saying that he did not share Parsons' and Hillman's affinity for country music. He was replaced by lead guitarist Bernie Leadon, while Hillman reverted to bass.

By this time, Parsons's drug use had increased to the point where new songs were rare, and much of his time was spent partying with the Rolling Stones, who were in America finishing Let It Bleed. As the Stones prepared to play the nation's largest venues, the Burritos played to dwindling nightclub audiences. But they were booked as one of the acts at the Altamont Music Festival. They played a short set, including "Bony Moronie" and "Six Days on the Road", which was included in the event's documentary Gimme Shelter.

With mounting debt incurred, A&M hoped to recoup some of its losses by marketing the Burritos as a straight country group. Manager Jim Dickson instigated a session where the band recorded honky tonk staples and contemporary pop covers in a countrified vein, but this was scrapped in favor of a second album of originals on an extremely reduced budget.

Faced with a dearth of new material, most of the album was hastily written in the studio by Leadon, Hillman, and Parsons, with two Gilded Palace of Sin outtakes thrown into the mix. The resulting album, Burrito Deluxe, was released in April 1970. Although it is considered less inspired than its predecessor, it is notable for the song "Older Guys" and for the band's take on "Wild Horses".

Like its predecessor, Burrito Deluxe under-performed commercially but also failed to carry the critical cachet of the debut. Disenchanted, Parsons left the Burritos in mutual agreement with Hillman; under Hillman, the group recorded one more album before dissolving in 1971.

=== Solo career and touring with Emmylou Harris (1970–1973) ===
In early 1970, Parsons signed a solo deal with A&M Records and moved in with producer Terry Melcher. The two shared a penchant for cocaine and heroin, and the sessions were largely unproductive, with Parsons eventually losing interest in the project. The master tapes were lost; it is unclear who took them.

Parsons accompanied the Rolling Stones on its 1971 UK tour in the hope of being signed to the newly formed Rolling Stones Records. He lived at Richards' French villa Nellcôte during the recording of Exile on Main Street, though he contributed little to the process. His drug use and constant quarrelling with his girlfriend, Gretchen Burrell, led to a request to leave by Richards' girlfriend, Anita Pallenberg. Parsons attempted to rekindle his relationship with the band on its 1972 American tour, to no avail.

Parsons returned to the US for a one-off concert with the Burritos. In Washington, D.C., he met Emmylou Harris and asked her to join him in Los Angeles to record his first solo album. It came as a surprise to many when Parsons was signed to Reprise Records by Mo Ostin in mid-1972. The ensuing GP (1973) featured several members of Elvis Presley's TCB Band. It included six new songs from Parsons alongside several country covers, including Tompall Glaser's "Streets of Baltimore" and George Jones' "That's All It Took".

Parsons, now featuring Harris as his duet partner, toured across the US as Gram Parsons and the Fallen Angels in February–March 1973. Unable to afford the TCB Band, the group featured guitarists Jock Bartley and Larry Coryell, Neil Flanz on pedal steel, bassist Kyle Tullis, and drummer N. D. Smart. The touring party also included Parsons' new wife, Gretchen Parsons, who was envious of Harris and her young daughter. Coordinating the spectacle as road manager was Phil Kaufman, who had served time with Charles Manson on Terminal Island but who ensured that the performer stayed clear of drugs and limited his alcohol intake during shows. At first, the band was under-rehearsed and played poorly; however, they improved with steady gigging and received rapturous responses at several counter-cultural venues, including Armadillo World Headquarters in Austin, Max's Kansas City in New York City, and Liberty Hall in Houston, where Neil Young and Linda Ronstadt sat in for a filmed performance. Nevertheless, the tour failed to galvanize sales of GP, which never charted in the Billboard 200.

For his next and final album, 1974's posthumously released Grievous Angel, Parsons used Harris and members of the TCB Band. The record received more enthusiastic reviews than GP. Although Parsons only contributed two new songs to the album ("In My Hour of Darkness" and "Return of the Grievous Angel"), he was reportedly enthusiastic with his new sound and seemed to have finally adopted a diligent mindset to his musical career, limiting his intake of alcohol and opiates during most of the sessions. Grievous Angel peaked at number 195 on the Billboard chart.

Before recording, Parsons and Harris played a preliminary four-show mini-tour as the headline act in a June 1973 Warner Bros. Records country rock package with the New Kentucky Colonels and Country Gazette. A shared backing band included Clarence White, Pete Kleinow and Chris Ethridge. On July 15, 1973, White was killed by a drunk driver in Palmdale, California, while loading equipment in his car for a concert with the New Kentucky Colonels. At White's funeral, Parsons and Bernie Leadon performed a rendition of "Farther Along"; that evening, Parsons reportedly informed Phil Kaufman of his final wish: to be cremated in Joshua Tree National Monument.

== Personal life ==
In 1971, Parsons married Gretchen Burrell (née Gretchen Lisl Berrill) at his stepfather's New Orleans estate. Parsons and Burrell went to England, where they visited their friend Ric Grech. With the help of Grech and his friend Hank Wangford, Parsons stopped using heroin.

In the summer of 1973, Parsons' Topanga Canyon home burned to the ground, the result of a stray cigarette. Nearly all of his possessions were destroyed with the exception of a guitar and a prized Jaguar. The fire proved to be the last straw in the relationship between Burrell and Parsons, who moved into a spare room in Kaufman's house. Parsons rekindled his relationship with Margaret Fisher, a high school sweetheart from Waycross.

Parsons had one child, born to Nancy Ross in 1967, Polly Parsons.

== Death ==
Gram Parsons died from a drug and alcohol overdose on September 19, 1973. He was 26 years old.

In the late 1960s, Parsons began to vacation at Joshua Tree National Monument in southeastern California, where he used psychedelics and said he experienced UFO sightings. After splitting from Burrell, Parsons often spent his weekends there with Margaret Fisher and Phil Kaufman. Scheduled to resume touring in October 1973, Parsons decided to go on another recuperative excursion on September 17. Accompanying him were Fisher, his assistant Michael Martin, and Martin's girlfriend Dale McElroy.

On both nights of their stay, Parsons retreated to the desert, consuming large amounts of alcohol and barbiturates, while the rest of the group visited bars in nearby Yucca Valley. On September 18, Martin drove back to Los Angeles to resupply the group with marijuana. That night, Parsons challenged Fisher and McElroy to drink with him; Fisher did not drink and McElroy was recovering from illness. Parsons said that he would drink for the three of them and drank six double tequilas. The three then went to the Joshua Tree Inn, where Parsons purchased morphine from an unknown woman; after being injected by her in Room No. 1, he overdosed. Fisher gave Parsons an ice cube suppository, and then a cold shower and moved him to Room No. 8. She put him to bed and went out to buy coffee in the hope of reviving him, leaving McElroy to stand guard. As his breathing became irregular and then ceased, McElroy attempted resuscitation. After all attempts failed, they called an ambulance. Parsons was declared dead on arrival at Yucca Valley Hospital at 12:15 a.m. on September 19, 1973. The official cause of death was an overdose of morphine and alcohol. Kaufman drove Fisher and McElroy back to Los Angeles and then dispersed the rest of Parsons' drugs in the desert.

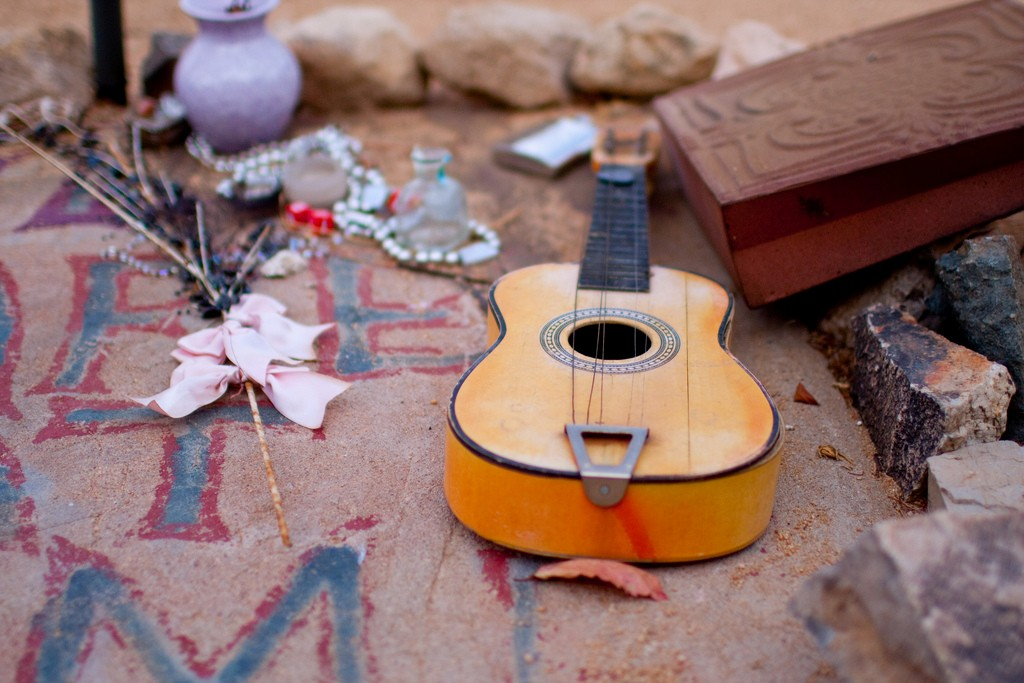
Parsons' makeshift memorial in Joshua Tree, California

Although Parsons had said he wanted his body cremated at Joshua Tree and his ashes spread over the formation Cap Rock, Parsons' stepfather organized a private ceremony in New Orleans and left the body in the care of a funeral home. But, to fulfill Parsons' wishes, Kaufman and a friend stole both a hearse and his body and drove it to Joshua Tree. At Cap Rock Parking Lot, they poured gasoline into the open coffin and lit it, creating an enormous fireball. They were arrested and eventually fined $750 for stealing the coffin. What remained of Parsons' body was buried in Garden of Memories Cemetery in Metairie, Louisiana.

The story brings Parsons fans out to a large rock flake informally known to rock climbers as the Gram Parsons Memorial Hand Traverse. At some point, someone added a slab that marked Parsons' cremation to the memorial rock; that slab was removed by the US National Park Service and moved to the Joshua Tree Inn. Joshua Tree park guides are given the option to tell the story of Parsons' cremation during tours, but there is no mention of the act in official maps or brochures.

== Legacy ==
Stephen Thomas Erlewine of AllMusic describes Parsons as "enormously influential" for both country and rock, "blending the two genres to the point that they became indistinguishable from each other ... his influence could still be heard well into the next millennium." In his 2005 essay on Parsons for Rolling Stone magazine's "100 Greatest Artist" list, Keith Richards notes that Parsons' recorded music output was "pretty minimal" but says that Parsons' "effect on country music is enormous ... and this is why we're talking about him now."

Emmylou Harris continued to champion Parsons' work, covering a number of his songs, including "Hickory Wind", "Wheels", "Sin City", "Luxury Liner", and "Hot Burrito No. 2". Harris's songs "Boulder to Birmingham", from her 1975 album Pieces of the Sky, and "The Road", from her 2011 album Hard Bargain, are tributes to Parsons. Her 1985 album The Ballad of Sally Rose includes many allusions to Parsons in its narrative. The song "My Man", written by Bernie Leadon and performed by the Eagles on their album On the Border, is a tribute to Gram Parsons.

The 1973 album Crazy Eyes by Poco pays homage to Parsons, as Richie Furay composed the title track in honor of him, and sings one of Parsons' own compositions, "Brass Buttons." The album was released four days before Parsons died.

Between 1996 and 2006, a festival called "Gram Fest", aka "The Cosmic Americana Music Festival" was held annually at Joshua Tree. The Gram Parsons Guitar Pull and Tribute Festival, in Waycross, Georgia, was founded in 1997 and continues today.

In 2003 the Americana Music Awards awarded Parsons with the President's Award, which was accepted by his daughter.

The 2003 film Grand Theft Parsons stars Johnny Knoxville as Phil Kaufman and chronicles a farcical version of the theft of Parsons' corpse. In 2006, Gandulf Hennig released the documentary Gram Parsons: Fallen Angel.

In 2004, Parsons' daughter Polly produced two tribute concerts titled "Return to Sin City: A Tribute to Gram Parsons". Artists included Keith Richards, James Burton, Lucinda Williams, Norah Jones, Dwight Yoakam, John Doe, Steve Earle, Jim Lauderdale, Kathleen Edwards, Jay Farrar, Jim James, Raul Malo, Susan Marshall, and the Sin City All Stars. The concert produced a DVD and 100% of the concerts was donated through the Gram Parsons Foundation to the Musician's Assistance Program (now MusiCares), which aids musicians in crisis.

Despite his influence, Parsons has yet to be inducted into the Country Music Hall of Fame. The Gram Parsons Petition Project (later named Gram Parsons InterNational) was begun in May 2008 in support of a drive to induct Parsons into the Country Music Hall of Fame. On September 19, 2008, the 35th anniversary of Parsons' death, it was presented to the Country Music Association (CMA) with the official Nomination Proposal. Parsons was inducted in the Rock and Roll Hall of Fame in 2026 through the influence category.

In November 2009, the musical theatre production Grievous Angel: The Legend of Gram Parsons premiered, starring Anders Drerup as Gram Parsons and Kelly Prescott as Emmylou Harris. Directed by Michael Bate and co-written by Bate and David McDonald, the production was inspired by a March 1973 interview that Bate conducted with Parsons, which became Parsons' last recorded conversation.

In 2012, Swedish folk duo First Aid Kit released the single "Emmylou" from the album The Lion's Roar. The song's chorus is a lyrical acknowledgment of the Gram Parsons and Emmylou Harris singing partnership.

In the fall of 2012 Florida festival promoter and musician Randy Judy presented his bio-musical Farther Along – The Music and Life of Gram Parsons at Magnoliafest at the Spirit of the Suwannee Music Park.

Tribute bands include Cleveland's New Soft Shoe and, out of St. Paul, The Gilded Palace Sinners.

In 2022, Dave Prinz, co-founder of Amoeba Music, rediscovered Gram Parsons' "Last Roundup" tapes featuring Emmylou Harris with Gram Parsons and the Fallen Angels. Prinz initiated a campaign to fund the release independently, in partnership with Polly Parsons. The campaign launched on November 17, 2022, and was fully backed. Gram Parsons & The Fallen Angels' "The Last Roundup: Live from The Bijou Café in Philadelphia 3/16/73" was released on limited-edition vinyl on Friday, November 24, 2023, and was considered one of the hits of Record Store Day 2023.

In 2021, Zak Bagans and his crew on the hit TV show Ghost Adventures, with a special guest, investigated the Joshua Tree Inn to bring both closure and peace to the Parsons family.

In 2026, a restaurant named "Grievous Angel" (named after the Gram Parsons album title) opened in Lakeland, Florida. The restaurant name reflects the owner's Gram Parsons music-inspired branding.

== Discography ==
Year	Album	Act	Label	Chart Positions (Note: '—' denotes the release failed to chart.)	
Year	Album	Act	Label	US	US Country
1968	Safe at Home	International Submarine Band	LHI Records	—N/a	—N/a
1968	Sweetheart of the Rodeo	The Byrds	Columbia	77	—N/a
1969	The Gilded Palace of Sin	Flying Burrito Brothers	A&M	164	—N/a
1970	Burrito Deluxe	Flying Burrito Brothers	A&M	—N/a	—N/a
1973	GP	solo	Reprise	—N/a	—N/a
1974	Grievous Angel	solo	Reprise	195	—N/a
1976	Sleepless Nights	Gram Parsons with the Flying Burrito Brothers	A&M	185	—N/a
1979	The Early Years (1963–1965)	solo	Sierra	—N/a	—N/a
1982	Live 1973	Gram Parsons and the Fallen Angels	Sierra	—N/a	—N/a
1987	Dim Lights, Thick Smoke and Loud Loud Music	Flying Burrito Brothers	Edsel	—N/a	—N/a
1988	Farther Along: The Best of the Flying Burrito Brothers	Flying Burrito Brothers	A&M	—N/a	—N/a
1995	Cosmic American Music: The Rehearsal Tapes 1972	solo	Magnum America	—N/a	—N/a
2000	Hot Burritos! The Flying Burrito Brothers Anthology 1969–1972	Flying Burrito Brothers	A&M	—N/a	—N/a
2001	Another Side of This Life: The Lost Recordings of Gram Parsons	solo	Sundazed	—N/a	—N/a
2001	Sacred Hearts & Fallen Angels: The Gram Parsons Anthology	solo	Rhino	—N/a	—N/a
2002	Sin City: The Very Best of the Flying Burrito Bros	Flying Burrito Brothers	A&M	—N/a	—N/a
2006	The Complete Reprise Sessions	solo	Reprise	—N/a	—N/a
2007	Archives Vol. 1: Live at the Avalon Ballroom 1969	Gram Parsons with the Flying Burrito Brothers	Amoeba	—N/a	45
2010	The Early Years Box Set	Gram Parsons and the Shilos	Sierra	—N/a	—N/a
2014	Live In New York 1973	Gram Parsons with Emmylou Harris	Plastic Soho	—N/a	—N/a
2014	180 Gram: Alternate Takes From GP and Grievous Angel	solo	Rhino/Reprise	—N/a	—N/a
2018	The Solo Years	solo	Rhino UK	—N/a	—N/a
2023	The Last Roundup: Live from the Bijou Café in Philadelphia 3/16/1973	Gram Parsons and the Fallen Angels	Amoeba	—N/a	—N/a
2024	Now Playing	solo	Rhino/Reprise	—N/a	—N/a

== Filmography ==
- The Trip (1967) – band member of the International Submarine Band
- Saturation 70 (1969) – soundtrack and role
- Gram Parsons: Fallen Angel (2006) – documentary

== Tribute albums ==
- Conmemorativo: A Tribute to Gram Parsons (1993)
- Return of the Grievous Angel: A Tribute to Gram Parsons (1999)

== Sources ==
- "Sweetheart of the Rodeo". Ebni.com. Archived from the original on October 28, 2010.
- Richards, Keith (April 21, 2005). "100 Greatest Artists of all Time: Gram Parsons, Number 87". Rolling Stone.
- Fong-Torres, Ben (1998). Paul Kingsbury (ed.). Gram Parsons. New York, NY: Oxford University Press.
- Meyer, David (2007). Twenty Thousand Roads: The Ballad of Gram Parsons and His Cosmic American Music. New York, NY: Villard Books. ISBN 978-0-375-50570-6.
- Road Mangler Deluxe, Phil Kaufman with Colin White, White-Boucke Publishing, 2005 (3rd edition). ISBN 1-888580-31-3
- Are You Ready for the Country: Elvis, Dylan, Parsons and the Roots of Country Rock, Peter Dogget, Penguin Books, 2001. ISBN 0-14-026108-7
- In the Country of Country: A Journey to the Roots of American Music, Nicholas Dawidoff, Vintage Books, 1998. ISBN 0-375-70082-X
- Fong-Torres, Ben (1991). Hickory Wind: The Life and Times of Gram Parsons. Pocket Books. ISBN 0-671-70513-X.
- Grievous Angel: An Intimate Biography of Gram Parsons, Jessica Hundley and Polly Parsons, Thunder's Mouth Press, 2005. ISBN 978-1-56025-673-1
- Proud to Be an Okie: Cultural Politics, Country Music, and Migration to Southern California, Peter La Chapelle. University of California Press, Berkeley, 2007. ISBN 978-0-520-24889-2
- Gram Parsons: God's Own Singer, Jason Walker, Soundcheck Books, London, 2012. ISBN 978-0-9566420-3-5
- Moody Food, Ray Robertson, SFWP, 2006. ISBN 0-9776799-0-X
- Live Fast, Die Young: Misadventures in Rock & Roll America, Chris Price & Joe Harland. Summersdale. 2010. ISBN 978-1-84953-049-1
- Trailblazers: Gram Parsons, Nick Drake & Jeff Buckley David Bret JRBooks, London, 2009.

Awards
Preceded by Doug Sahm	AMA Presidents Award; 2003	Succeeded by Carter Family
