= GP (album) =

Studio album by Gram Parsons
- Released: January 1973
- Recorded: September–October 1972
- Studios: Wally Heider Studio 4, Hollywood, California
- Genre: Country rock
- Length: 38:26
- Label: Reprise
- Producers: Gram Parsons, Ric Grech

Gram Parsons chronology
Burrito Deluxe with The Flying Burrito Brothers (1970)	GP (1973)	Grievous Angel (1974)

Singles from GP
- 1. "She" Released: January 1973; 2. "The New Soft Shoe" Released: March 1973

Professional ratings
Review scores
Source	Rating
AllMusic	5/5 stars
Christgau's Record Guide	B+

GP is American singer-songwriter Gram Parsons' debut solo album, and the only one released during his lifetime. It was originally released in a gatefold sleeve in 1973. GP received critical acclaim upon release, but failed to reach the Billboard charts. In the original Rolling Stone review, which individually covered both GP and its follow-up, Grievous Angel, the reviewer praises Parsons' vocals and delivery paraphrasing Gram's lyrics, "boy, but he sure can sing".

== Background ==
After being dismissed from his previous band, the critically acclaimed Flying Burrito Brothers, Parsons decided to embark on a solo career. Unlike his two albums with the Burritos, which melded country and western with soul and rock music, Parsons was determined to make a more traditional country record. However, Parsons' ongoing drug problem (which was a deciding factor for his being fired from the Burritos) and his friendship with Keith Richards of the Rolling Stones would delay his solo plans. As Mojo writer John Harris recalls in his article "The Lost Boy," Parsons had spent March 1971 hanging out with the Stones entourage on their 10-day "Goodbye Britain" tour and then, after spending much of the summer in London, he and (girlfriend) Gretchen Burrell flew to the South of France and spent two months "living in Nellcote, Keith and Anita's rented abode-cum-zoo-cum-studio." As the Stones spent months struggling to complete their ragged masterpiece Exile on Main Street in the basement, Parsons could be found upstairs where he was often joined by Richards spending hours passing the guitar back and forth singing old country songs. However, Parsons' condition eventually deteriorated to the point where he was booted from the premises, as David N. Meyer recounts in his 2007 Parsons biography Twenty Thousand Roads: "At Nellcote no one, not even Richards, saw rescuing Gram as a project that had much chance of success. Tolerance for his self-destruction had run out. The Stones had an album to record. Gram provided inspiration for much of what ended up on the record, but he had become a drag. It was time for him to go." Devastated at being ousted from the Stones inner circle, Parsons returned to London and, for a brief period, stayed with his former bandmate from The International Submarine Band Ian Dunlop in Cornwall before returning to Los Angeles intending to make a solo album for Warner Bros.

== Recording and composition ==
Country megastar Merle Haggard agreed to produce Parsons's first solo album but backed out at the last minute. According to Meyer's Twenty Thousand Roads, Warner Bros. arranged a meeting at Haggard's Bakersfield home and the two musicians seemed to hit it off but later, on the afternoon of the first session, Haggard canceled. Parsons, an enormous Haggard fan, was crushed, with his wife Gretchen telling Meyer, "Merle not producing Gram was probably one of the greatest disappointments in Gram's life. Merle was very nice, very sweet, but he had his own enemies and his own demons." Parsons did manage to hire Haggard's engineer Hugh Davies for his upcoming album, as well as the core of Elvis Presley's band: James Burton (who had also played on Haggard's records) on guitar, Glen D. Hardin on piano and organ, and Ronnie Tutt on drums. Parson's biggest coup, however, was discovering Emmylou Harris, an unknown singer from Washington, D.C., who was recommended to Parsons by Chris Hillman. In the BBC documentary Beyond Nashville Harris recalls, "I would say until I had met Gram and started working with him I didn't really understand or have a real love or feel for country music. Like most of my generation, you know, country music was politically incorrect for us at that point. It was associated with Republicans and Right Wing and that sort of thing. He taught me the beauty and the poetry, the simplicity, the honesty in the music. And the love of harmony came from really singing with him."

The sessions for GP ran from September through October 1972 and were produced by former Blind Faith bassist Ric Grech. Parsons was beside himself with excitement at being surrounded by such stellar musicians but also severely intimidated by their presence; in a February 2013 cover story for Uncut, David Cavanagh recalls the singer's reticence: "Rehearsals for GP descended into drug binges. The songs were coming together – 'Still Feeling Blue' (a Parsons original), 'Kiss The Children' (by Grech), 'Streets of Baltimore' (a 1966 composition by Tompall Glaser and Harlan Howard) – but Gram was falling apart at the seams. He was in the grip of alcoholism. He gorged on cocaine. He was bloated and sweaty; friends in Los Angeles estimated he'd put on three stone (42 pounds) since his Burrito days. Singer and rhythm guitarist Barry Tashian remembers him being 'nervously excited' about the album, but strangely paralysed by inaction." In the 2004 documentary Gram Parsons: Fallen Angel, Harris admits, "Gram was drinking a lot during that recording, and so there were times when he was together and times when he wasn't. I hadn't done that much recording in my life but I thought, 'If this is the way people make records, I just don't get this.'" Realising he could be blowing his big chance, Parsons cut back on his drinking and finished the sessions.

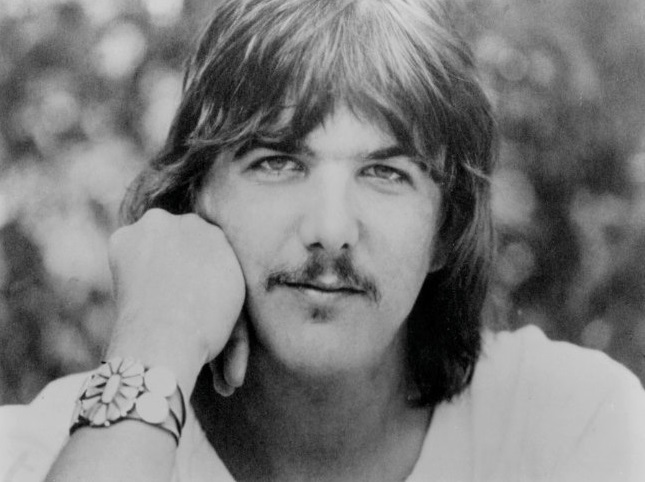
Gram Parsons in 1972

The songs on GP display Parsons' appreciation for both the Bakersfield sound pioneered by Haggard and Buck Owens as well as his love for both mainstream country music and R&B. The album is just as much a showcase for Harris, who performs two proper duets with Parsons in the style of George Jones and Tammy Wynette on "That's All It Took" (a song penned by Jones) and "We'll Sweep Out the Ashes in the Morning." The latter is classic country fare about two lovers racked by guilt and who agree their affair has to stop – but not yet. As Mojo's David Cavanagh observed in 2013, several songs on the album, such as "A Song For You" and "She," are about "the South Parsons emerged from – or at least the way he would wish to portray it to us – with Biblical imagery in every vista and trembling earth that shakes the trees loose...If it has such a thing as a concept, GP is a country album about country music itself." Parsons demonstrates a quiet, restrained vocal approach on several songs, such as "Kiss the Children" and "How Much I've Lied," infusing the material with a maturity that was not as evident on his previous recordings where his singing is noted for its almost childlike vulnerability. Parsons also recorded the J. Geils Band song "Cry One More Time," transforming the standard R&B lament into what he often referred to as Cosmic American Music, a mixture of several American musical styles. Engineer Hugh Davies would later recall to Parsons biographer David Meyers in 2007, "It was sort of funky country. Not quite rock, but beyond traditional country."

The cover of GP features Parsons sitting in a chair at the Chateau Marmont in Hollywood, where he lived with his wife when the first album was recorded.

== The Fallen Angels ==
Parsons would also tour in support of the LP, assembling a band he called The Fallen Angels, which included Emmylou Harris. In the 2004 Fallen Angel documentary, steel guitarist Neil Flanz states that the rehearsals, which took place at manager Phil Kaufman's home in Van Nuys, California, were an unmitigated disaster: "It was just, like, party time most of the time. We weren't serious enough about the rehearsals. It was just wild. Everyone was playing music and having a good time but we weren't taking care of business." Adds Kaufman: "We had a big party, Warner Bros. threw a big party for us to go on the tour. We had a tour bus, and the worst tour bus ever. Ever. Gram brought along Gretchen and we left my house and went on our tour, and the tour was just disaster after disaster." By all accounts, it was largely Harris's determination that disciplined the band and turned the shows around.

== Reception ==
Like his work with the Flying Burrito Brothers, GP was not a commercial success; neither the album or its single "She" cracked the Billboard 200. However, it was critically praised at the time of its release, with Bud Scoppa of Rolling Stone gushing, "Gram Parsons is an artist with a vision as unique and personal as those of Jagger/Richards, Ray Davies or any other of the celebrated figures," and praised the album's "rustic authenticity" and Gram's "amazing voice." The album has only risen in esteem since, with AllMusic giving it five stars out five and deeming it "probably the best realized expression of his musical personality...this album remains a haunting reminder of Parsons' talent and influence, and has only gotten better with the passing years." In the liner notes to the 1982 compilation GP, Elvis Costello wrote, "Gram Parsons had helped create a Frankenstein's monster: country rock. But his first Warners LP, GP, paid no allegiance to this style...The songs are of lost or stolen love, crossed with an occasional R'nB beat...If it should fail to move you, then you have a big problem." Amazon.com states, "Gram Parsons's debut solo album GP allowed audiences to appreciate Gram's incredible vocals and lyrical delivery."

== Track listing ==
All tracks are written by Gram Parsons unless otherwise indicated.

Side One
No.	Title	Writer(s)	Length
1.	"Still Feeling Blue"		2:40
2.	"We'll Sweep Out the Ashes in the Morning"	Joyce Allsup	3:13
3.	"A Song for You"		4:58
4.	"Streets of Baltimore"	Tompall Glaser, Harlan Howard	2:53
5.	"She"	Parsons, Chris Ethridge	4:59

Side Two
No.	Title	Writer(s)	Length
1.	"That's All It Took"	Darrell Edwards, Charlotte Grier, George Jones	3:38
2.	"The New Soft Shoe"		3:54
3.	"Kiss the Children"	Ric Grech	2:57
4.	"Cry One More Time"	Peter Wolf, Seth Justman	3:38
5.	"How Much I've Lied"	Parsons, David Rivkin	2:29
6.	"Big Mouth Blues"		3:52

== Personnel ==
- Gram Parsons – vocals, acoustic guitar
- Emmylou Harris – vocals
- Barry Tashian – vocals, rhythm guitar
- Ric Grech – bass guitar
- John Conrad – bass
- Ron Tutt – drums
- John Guerin – drums
- Sam Goldstein – drums
- Glen D. Hardin – piano, organ, bandleader
- James Burton – electric guitar, Dobro
- Al Perkins – pedal steel guitar
- Buddy Emmons – pedal steel guitar
- Byron Berline – fiddle
- Alan Munde – banjo on "Still Feeling Blue"
- Ron Hicklin, Tom Bahler, Mitch Gordon, Lewis Morford – backing vocals on "Kiss the Children"
- Hal Battiste – baritone saxophone on "Cry One More Time"
