= David Grier discography =

David Grier is an American guitarist. In addition to his solo albums and recordings with Psychograss, Richard Greene and The Grass Is Greener, and with Todd Phillips and Matt Flinner, he has been featured as a performer on many albums by other artists.

== Solo albums ==
The he has released the following Solo albums:

- 1988: Freewheeling (Rounder)
- 1991: Climbing the Walls (Rounder) with Mike Compton
- 1995: Lone Soldier (Rounder)
- 1997: Panorama (Rounder)
- 1998: Hootenanny (Dreadnought)
- 2002: I've Got the House to Myself (Dreadnought)
- 2009: Evocative (Dreadnought)
- 2014: Fly on the Wall (Dreadnought)
- 2018: Ways of the World (Dreadnought)

== Live albums ==
- 2007: Live at the Linda (Dreadnought)

== As a member of Psychograss ==
- 1996: Like Minds (Sugar Hill)
- 2005: Now Hear This (Adventure)

== As a member of The Big Dogs ==
- 1990: Live at the Birchmere (Strictly Country)

== With Richard Greene and The Grass Is Greener ==
- 1996: Wolves A Howlin' (Rebel)
- 1997: Sales Tax Toddle (Rebel)
- 2001: The Grass Is Greener (Rebel)

== With Todd Phillips and Matt Flinner ==
- 1999: Phillips, Grier, and Flinner (Compass)
- 2002: Looking Back (Compass)

== Also appears on ==
=== 1989 - 1991 ===
- 1986: Doug Dillard Band - What's That? (Flying Fish)
- 1987: Country Gazette - Strictly Instrumental (Flying Fish)
- 1989: Fred Koller - Songs From The Night Before (Alcazar)
- 1989: Kenny Baker and Blaine Sprouse - Indian Springs (Rounder)
- 1990: Rhonda Vincent - A Dream Come True (Rebel)
- 1991: Ginger Boatwright - Fertile Ground (Flying Fish)
- 1991: Vassar Clements - Grass Routes (Rounder)
- 1991: Country Gazette - Hello Operator...This Is Country Gazette (Flying Fish)
- 1991: John McEuen - String Wizards (Vanguard)
- 1991: Roger Bellow - On the Road to Prosperity (Flying Fish)

=== 1992 - 1994 ===
- 1992: All Night Gang - Bluegrass From Nashville (Rebel)
- 1992: Stuart Duncan - Stuart Duncan (Rounder)
- 1982: Tony Furtado - Within Reach (Rounder)
- 1992: Bill Keith - Beating Around the Bush (Green Linnet)
- 1993: Claire Lynch - Friends for a Lifetime (Rounder)
- 1993: John McEuen - String Wizards II (Vanguard)
- 1994: Larry Perkins - A Touch of the Past (Pinecastle)
- 1994: Roland White - Trying to Get to You (Sugar Hill)

=== 1995 - 1996 ===
- 1995: Joe Carr - Windy Days and Dusty Skies (Flying Fish)
- 1995: Bill Evans - Native & Fine (Rounder)
- 1995: Claire Lynch - Moonlighter (Rounder)
- 1995: Butch Robins - Grounded Centered Focused (Hay Holler)
- 1995: Salamander Crossing - Salamander Crossing (Signature Sounds)
- 1995: Tony Trischka - Live at Birchmere (Strictly Country)
- 1995: Tony Trischka - Glory Shone Around: A Christmas Collection (Rounder)
- 1996: Exit Thirteen - Wind on My Back (Freeland)

=== 1997 - 1999 ===
- 1997: Darol Anger - Heritage (Six Degrees)
- 1997: Jason Carter - On The Move (Rounder)
- 1997: Trace Adkins - Big Time (Capitol)
- 1997: Katsuyuki Miyazaki - Man-O-Mandolin (Red Clay)
- 1997: Chris Thile - Stealing Second (Sugar Hill)
- 1998: Butch Baldassari - New Classics for Bluegrass Mandolin (SoundArt)
- 1998: Matt Flinner - The View from Here (Compass).
- 1998: Molasses Creek - Citybound (Molasses Creek)
- 1998: Alan Munde and Joe Carr - Welcome to West Texas (Flying Fish)
- 1998: Tom Rozum - Jubilee (Signature Sounds)
- 1999: George McClure - Champagne Saturday (I Made Love to an Alien Last Night) (Just Iss Planetary)
- 1999: Anke Summerhill - The Roots Run Deep (Independent Songwriters)

=== 2000 - 2004 ===
- 2000: Alison Brown - Fair Weather (Compass)
- 2000: Gwendolyn Fields - Fewer Threads Than These (Orchard)
- 2000: Ronnie McCoury - Heartbreak Town (Rounder)
- 2001: Candlewyck - Candlewyck (Votive)
- 2001: Matt Flinner - Latitude (Compass)
- 2001: Lonesome Whistle - Railroad Classics (Cumberland)
- 2002: Jimmy Campbell - Young Opry Fiddler (Pinecastle)
- 2002: Frank Solivan - I Am a Rambler (Fiddlemon)
- 2002: Rhonda Vincent - My Blue Tears (Rebel)
- 2003: Brad Davis - I'm Not Gonna Let My Blues Bring Me Down (FGM)
- 2003: Ross Nickerson - Blazing the West (Pinecastle)
- 2003: David Thompson and Ben Winship - Fishing Music (Snake River)
- 2004: Noam Pikelny - In the Maze (Compass)

=== 2005 - 2009 ===
- 2006: Bryan Sutton - Not Too Far from the Tree (Sugar Hill)
- 2007: Tony Trischka - Double Banjo Bluegrass Spectacular (Rounder)
- 2008: Craig Duncan and the Smoky Mountain Band - Country Mountain Melodies (Green Hill)
- 2008: Craig Duncan and the Smoky Mountain Band - Bluegrass Jamboree (Green Hill)
- 2008: Margot Leverett - Second Avenue Square Dance (Traditional Crossroads)
- 2009: Mark Howard - Smoky Mountain Old Time Traditions (Cumberland)
- 2009: Kristin Scott Benson - Second Season (Pinecastle)
- 2009: Andy Hall - Sound of the Slide Guitar (Sugar Hill)

=== 2010 - present ===
- 2011: Dave Giegerich - It's About Time (CD Baby)
- 2011: Noam Pikelny - Beat the Devil and Carry a Rail (Compass)
- 2012: Bill Evans - In Good Company (Burnside)
- 2012: various artists - Pa's Fiddle: Charles Ingalls, American Fiddler (Pa's Fiddle)
- 2013: Craig Duncan - Civil War: Songs of the North (Spring Hill)
- 2013: Craig Duncan - Civil War: Songs of the South (Spring Hill)
- 2014: Michael Barnett - One Song Romance (Compass)
- 2016: Claire Lynch - North by South (Compass)

== Music instruction ==
- 1996: The Bluegrass Guitar Techniques of David Grier book (Hal Leonard) ISBN 9780793568666
- 2006: Bluegrass Guitar: Building Powerful Solos DVD (Homespun) with Happy Traum
