= Roger Bush (musician) =

American musician (born 1940)

- Born: September 16, 1940 (age 85); Hollywood, California
- Genres: Bluegrass music, country music
- Occupation: Musician
- Instruments: Double bass, guitar

Roger Bush (born September 16, 1940) is an American upright bassist and guitarist, best known as a founding member of the Kentucky Colonels and Country Gazette.

== Early history ==
Roger Bush was born in Hollywood and raised in El Monte, California. After high school, he started the Green Mountain Boys bluegrass group with his brother Sherman and future Golden State Boys Don Parmley and Tom Kuehl.

== Kentucky Colonels ==
Roland White (brother of Clarence White) taught Bush how to play upright bass. In 1961, Bush replaced bassist Eric White (brother of Roland and Clarence) in the Country Boys, which in 1962 became the Kentucky Colonels.

In 1962, Bush accompanied Clarence White on guitar on a recording captured on a home tape recorder. This recording was released in 1980 by Sierra as 33 Acoustic Guitar Instrumentals.

When the Kentucky Colonels disbanded in 1966, Bush played in a country group called Trio with Clarence White and drummer Bart Haney.

== Doug Dillard Expedition ==
Bush met Byron Berline in September 1969 and replaced David Jackson in Doug Dillard and the Expedition (after the departure of Gene Clark from Dillard & Clark.

== Country Gazette ==
In 1971, Bush and Berline formed Country Gazette. They initially assisted the Flying Burrito Brothers with a tour and live album, then recorded their first album in 1972. Bush stayed with Country Gazette until 1977. The original Country Gazette (including Bush) reunited in 1980 and again in 1985.

== Discography ==
=== As part of the Kentucky Colonels ===
- 1962: The New Sound Of Bluegrass America (Briar) reissued by Sierra in 2007
- 1964: Appalachian Swing! (World Pacific)
- 1964: Long Journey Home (Vanguard) released 1991
- 1965: Scotty Stoneman with the Kentucky Colonels: Live in L.A. (Sierra)
- 1988: On Stage (Rounder) from 1964
- 1999: Live In Stereo (Double Barrel) from 1965

=== As part of Country Gazette ===
- 1972: A Traitor In Our Midst! (United Artists)
- 1973: Don't Give Up Your Day Job (United Artists)
- 1975: Country Gazette Live (Transatlantic)
- 1976: Out To Lunch aka The Sunny Side of the Mountain (Flying Fish / Transatlantic)

=== With Billy Ray Lathum and Clarence White ===
- 2007: Rare Performance (Shikata) recorded in summer 1964)

=== With the Flying Burrito Brothers ===
- 1972: The Last of the Red Hot Burritos (A&M)
- 1973: Live in Amsterdam (Ariola)
- 1974: Bluegrass Special (Ariola)

=== With Clarence White ===
- 1962: Clarence White: 33 Acoustic Guitar Instrumentals (Sierra) with Bush playing rhythm guitar

=== Also appears on ===
- 1968: Rudy Q. Jones - A Soldier for Jesus (Warrior)
- 1970. Douglas Dillard - The Banjo Album (Together)
- 1972: Stephen Stills and Manassas - Manassas (Atlantic)
- 1973: Gene Parsons - Kindling (Warner Bros.)
- 1974: Arlo Guthrie - Arlo Guthrie (Reprise)
- 1974: Leslie Keith - Black Mountain Blues (Briar)
- 1974: Steve, Leroy & Brother Dave - Bluegrass Gospel According To Steve, Leroy & Brother Dave (Manna)
- 1975: Alan Munde - Alan Munde's Banjo Sandwich (Ridge Runner)
- 1975: Jerry Riopelle - Take a Chance (ABC)
- 1976: Dave Ferguson - Somewhere Over the Rainbow and Other Fiddle Tunes (Ridge Runner)
- 1976: Arlo Guthrie - Hobo's Lullaby (Reprise)
- 1976: The Grossman Brothers - Golden Skies (Dixie Licks)
- 1976: Dan Huckabee - Why Is This Man Smiling (Ridge Runner)
- 1976: Roland White - I Wasn't Born To Rock'n Roll (Ridge Runner)
- 1977: Sam Bush And Alan Munde -Together Again For the First Time
- 1977: Rick Nelson - Intakes (Epic)
- 1978: Jim Silvers - ...You Gotta Let All the Girls Know You're a Cowboy (CMH)
- 1979: Gene Parsons - Melodies (Sierra)
