= Appalachian Swing! =

Studio album by Kentucky Colonels
- Released: April 20, 1964
- Recorded: February 1964
- Studios: World Pacific Studios, Los Angeles, CA
- Genre: bluegrass
- Length: 26:47
- Label: World Pacific
- Producers: Ed Pearl, Richard Bock

Kentucky Colonels chronology
The New Sound of Bluegrass America (1963)	Appalachian Swing! (1964)

Appalachian Swing! is the second album by the American bluegrass band the Kentucky Colonels and was released on April 20, 1964 on World Pacific Records. Although it failed to chart in America, the album sold reasonably well over the course of the year and became an influential underground classic. A number of critics and authors have commented on how guitarist Clarence White's flatpicking guitar style on the album influenced the development of bluegrass guitar playing.

== Recording ==
Appalachian Swing! was recorded in one marathon evening session, without any overdubbing, at World Pacific Studios in Los Angeles, with the band's manager and owner of the Ash Grove folk club, Ed Pearl, co-producing with Richard Bock. Bock also originated the album's title, which is a play on composer Aaron Copland's popular orchestral suite, Appalachian Spring, as well as a reference to how he felt the group's music "swung".

Unlike the Colonels' previous album, Appalachian Swing! is an entirely instrumental record—a creative decision that was taken in an effort to keep recording costs down. However, there is speculation among some bluegrass aficionados that, in making Appalachian Swing! a purely instrumental album, World Pacific was attempting to emulate the success of Glen Campbell's early '60s instrumental records, such as The Astounding 12-String Guitar of Glen Campbell.

== Release and reception ==
The album was issued in the United States by World Pacific on April 20, 1964, in both mono and stereo configurations. Upon release, the album garnered positive reviews and, although it failed to chart, was a commercially successful and influential record in bluegrass circles. Author Christopher Hjort has noted that, with the release of Appalachian Swing!, the Kentucky Colonels came to be considered by fans and critics as one of the best bluegrass groups in the United States by the end of 1964.

A number of authors have noted that the Colonels' virtuoso guitarist Clarence White permanently expanded the language of bluegrass guitar with his flatpicking style on Appalachian Swing! Writing for the AllMusic website, Thom Owens called the album "revolutionary", noting that it was "one of the most influential albums in the whole of bluegrass music, primarily because of the stunning playing of Clarence White. With his vibrant, innovative flat-picking, White helped pioneer a new style in bluegrass; namely, he redefined the acoustic guitar as a solo instrument instead of confining it to just background status." Band biographers Tom and Chris Skinker have also commented on how Clarence's guitar playing "showed the endless possibilities open to bluegrass guitarists and established the guitar as an active and powerful solo voice, giving the instrument the impact and strength to take the place it now holds." In The Rough Guide to Music USA, Richie Unterberger called Appalachian Swing!, "one of the classic instrumental bluegrass albums."

== Reissues ==
Appalachian Swing! has been reissued several times since its initial release. It was first reissued in 1974 in the United Kingdom under the title of Kentucky Colonels, with both sides of the band's non-album, 1965 single "Ballad of Farmer Brown" b/w "For Lovin' Me" included as bonus tracks. This expanded edition was reissued on CD in 1997 by BGO Records. The album was reissued with its original track listing and artwork intact in 1982, and Rounder Records again reissued it in its original form, in a remixed and remastered CD edition in 1993. EMI Music Special Markets reissued the album in 2005, with the addition of three bonus tracks taken from Tut Taylor's 1964 album Dobro Country, which featured Clarence and Roland White as sidemen.

== Track listing ==
Side one
No.	Title	Writer(s)	Length
1.	"Clinch Mountain Back-Step"	Ruby Rakes	2:00
2.	"Nine Pound Hammer"	traditional, arranged Merle Travis	2:47
3.	"Listen to the Mocking Bird"	Alice Hawthorne, Richard Milburn, arranged Clarence White	2:21
4.	"Wild Bill Jones"	traditional	2:41
5.	"Billy in the Low Ground"	traditional	1:38
6.	"Lee Highway"	Arthur Smith	1:19

Side two
No.	Title	Writer(s)	Length
1.	"I Am a Pilgrim"	traditional, arranged G.W. Marton	2:40
2.	"Prisoner's Song"	Guy Massey	2:25
3.	"Sally Goodin"	traditional	1:36
4.	"Faded Love"	Bob Wills, John Wills, Billy Jack Wills	2:23
5.	"John Henry"	traditional	2:51
6.	"Flat Fork"	Billy Ray Latham	2:19

2005 CD reissue bonus tracks
No.	Title	Writer(s)	Length
13.	"Pickin' Flat"	Tut Taylor	3:04
14.	"A Fool Such as I"	Bill Trader	2:57
15.	"Black Ridge Ramble"	Tut Taylor	2:49

== Personnel ==
- Roland White – mandolin
- Clarence White – acoustic guitar
- Billy Ray Latham – banjo
- Roger Bush – double bass, banjo
- Bobby Sloane – fiddle
- LeRoy Mack – Dobro
