= Alan Munde =

American bluegrass musician (born 1946)

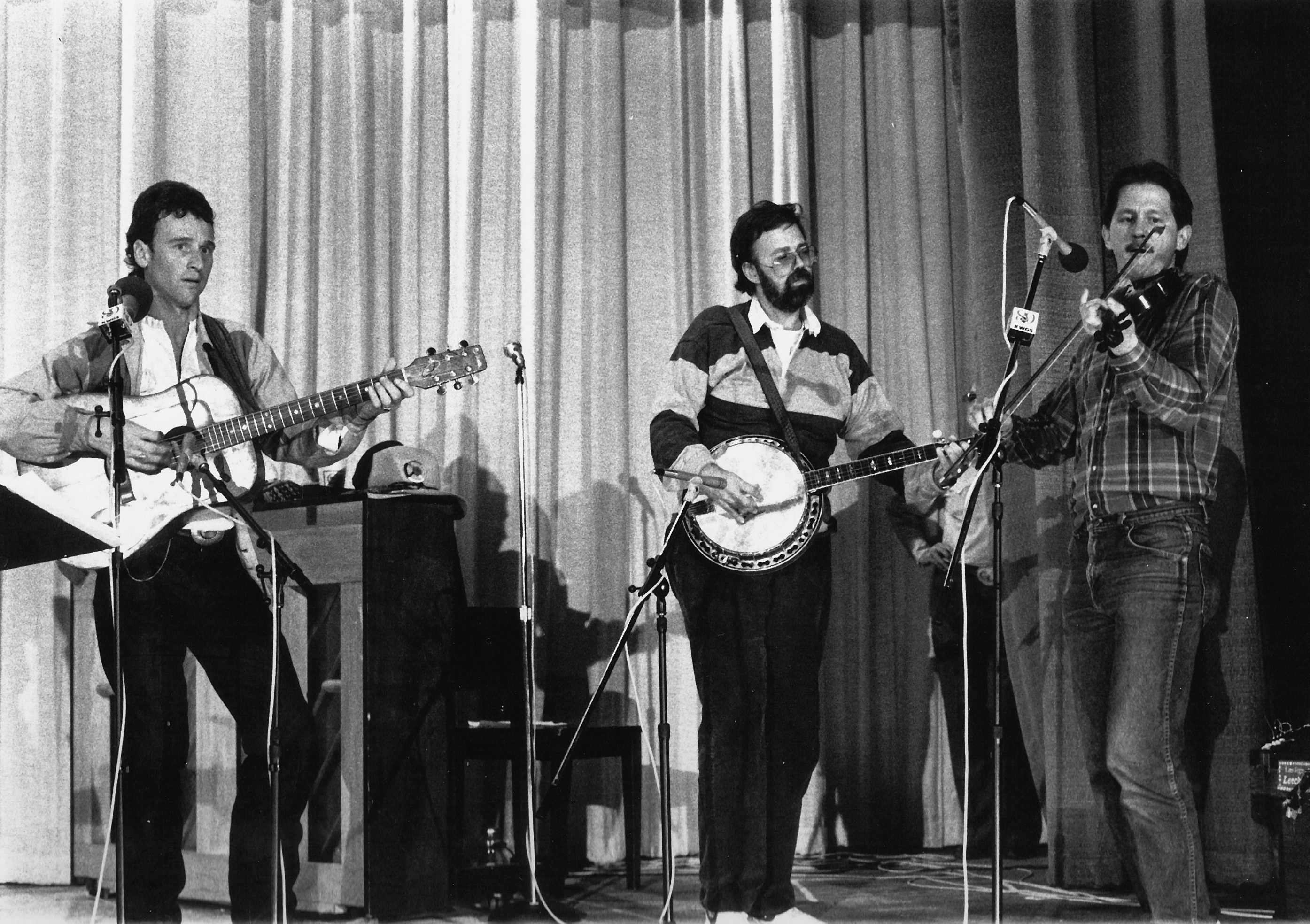
- Larry Long, Munde and Fiddlin' Pete Watercott in 1988

Background information
- Born: November 4, 1946 (age 79)
- Origin: Norman, Oklahoma, United States
- Genres: Bluegrass
- Occupation: Musician
- Instruments: Banjo, Acoustic Guitar
- Years active: 1960s–present

Alan Munde (born November 4, 1946) is an American banjoist and bluegrass musician. He was inducted into the International Bluegrass Music Hall of Fame in 2024.

== Biography ==
Born in Norman, Oklahoma, Munde learned banjo from a well-regarded Oklahoman banjo player, Ed Shelton. He frequently played amateur gigs around the state where he first met Byron Berline at the University of Oklahoma. Shelton introduced Munde to three Dallas bluegrass players: Mitchell Land, Louis "Bosco" Land and Harless "Tootie" Williams. The four of them joined to form The Stone Mountain Boys in 1965. Munde moved to Kentucky in January 1969 after he had graduated from college to play with Wayne Stewart and Sam Bush in a group called Poor Richard's Almanac.

Wayne Stewart had this idea for a group with this kid he knew in Kentucky named Sam Bush, who was probably 15. So I moved to Hopkinsville, Kentucky, and we formed Poor Richard's Almanac. Not long after, I got my draft notice, but before I left, Sam, Wayne and I made this tape, later released by Ridge Runner Records, called Poor Richard's Almanac, that was a lot of the instrumental things we were doing. I then went back to Oklahoma, was rejected by the Army, and worked in Norman that summer.

— Pamm Tucker, Bluegrass Today, October 28, 2022

For this first album, Muleskinner News reviewer Bill Vernon observed that Alan Munde: "puts his accomplished technique and wealth of ideas to full use". On the biographical web page of the Steve Martin banjo price of 2021, attributed to Alan Munde this first Album is described as "legendary and groundbreaking".

At the time, Jimmy Martin was looking for a banjo player. Doyle Lawson, his mandolinist, had been very impressed by Alan Munde's banjo work. Doyle Lawson asked him to play with Jimmy Martin. But Jimmy Martin, who had heard him play, said it didn't match the style he was looking for (that of J. D. Crowe). Doyle Lawson replied "no, but he can". Munde joined the Martin's Sunny Mountain Boys and played with this backing band from October 1969 to October 1971. He recorded thirteen tracks, for three different albums. Alan Munde "completely changed his style of banjo playing to fit the Martin sound". He remembered: "when I worked with Jimmy, I was encouraged to play like J.D. (..) I loved that; never had any problem with that - I wanted to sound like too.". But that didn't stop him from developing "his own highly musical and influential version of a melodic style". In the meantime he earned his living by working as a school teacher in Nashville.

In 1972, Munde became a member of the Flying Burrito Brothers, performing again with Byron Berline, for a European tour; in England, Holland and Denmark. The Amsterdam concert at the Concertgebouw in March was recorded in its entirety. In 1973 Ariola released a double LP setLive In Amsterdam containing most of the show. After this European tour, the Burritos split up and Alan Munde (banjo), Byron Berline (fiddle, mandolin), Kenny Wertz (guitar) and Roger Bush (bass) formed the Country Gazette. The group spent the summer of 1972 performing at Disneyland and in the fall, Country Gazette went on to record their first album Traitor In Our Midst.

According to Gary Reid, the Bluegrass Unlimited reviewer Walt Saunders described this record as "some of the best bluegrass music ever recorded by a West Coast band " and rated Alan Munde's banjo work as "easily his best to date, and he seems musically much more at home with this group". The release of the album was followed with a promotional tour around the States, early in 1973.

Around the same time, Roland White left Lester Flatt's Nashville Grass and reunited with his brothers, Clarence and Eric, formed the White brothers, also known as the New Kentucky Colonel. At the end of May 1973, Alan Munde replaced Herb Pedersen on the banjo for a gig with the New Kentucky Colonels at the Mosebacke club, Stockholm May 28–29, 1973.

The Gazette's second album, “Don’t Give Up Your Day Job,” was recorded in the summer of 1973. In July, Kenny Wertz left the group and was replaced by Roland White, who became available following the tragic death of his brother Clarence in July 1973. In September, The Country Gazette with Roland White returned to Europe for a third tour. In 1974, Berline also left the group, to create Sundance. Later, Kenny Wertz returned on vocals and guitar, and Roland White switched to mandolin. The Country Gazette toured again in Europe: Holland, England and at festivals in Switzerland and the south of France (Cazals), in summer 1975. This line-up (Alan Munde on banjo, Kenny Wertz on guitar, Roland White on mandolin and Roger Bush on bass) recorded the 1976 album Out to Lunch for Flying Fish, with fiddler Dave Ferguson and Al Perkins on pedal steel as guests.

For the next twenty years Munde remained a central figure in Country Gazette, the only original member to do so. From the mid-1970s onwards, the composition of the group varied. After Out to Lunch (1976), Kenny Wertz left the band, replaced by Texas-based Joe Carr, a former member of Roanoke. Bass player Mike Anderson, also of Roanoke, completed this new line-up from All This, and Money, Too! (1977) to American And Clean (1981). Joe Carr left after America's Bluegrass Band (1982), replaced in 1984 by Gene Wooten (Dobro, Guitar, Vocals), playing and singing for Bluegrass Tonight (1986) and Strictly Instrumental(1987). In 1989, Roland White left the group to join the Nashville Bluegrass Band. On the next album (Keep On Pushing, 1991), the band is referred to as Alan Munde & Country Gazette, then later as Alan Munde Gazette (Made To Last, 2008). This band features Alan Munde on banjo, Elliott Rogers on guitar and vocals, Bill Honker on bass and vocals, Steve Smith on mandolin and vocals, and Nate Lee on fiddle vocals. During these twenty years, notable musicians played as guest on the band's album, such as: Sam Bush, Slim Richey, and Richard Greene.

For Gary Reid it was as a solo artist, that Munde realized his greatest potential. Over the course of his career, Alan Munde has recorded numerous "popular banjo instrumental albums". The first was Alan Munde's Banjo Sandwich in 1975, with the assistance of Roland White, Roger Bush, Dave Ferguson and Doc Hamilton. For the article devoted to him in Bluegrass Unlimited in 1976, Alan Munde declared: "There are some things on it I always wanted to do (..) a few slow pieces and some original stuff.".

In 1977, Munde and mandolinist Sam Bush recorded Together Again for the First Time with Roland White, Curtis Burch and John Cowan (both members of New Grass Revival with Bush).

Munde has served on the board of directors of the International Bluegrass Music Association. He taught full-time in the bluegrass and country music program at South Plains College from 1986 to May 2007.

Munde wrote and hosted a monthly five-string banjo column for Frets Magazine during the 1980s.

In 2021, Alan won the Steve Martin Banjo Prize.

== Discography ==
=== As leader or co-leader ===
- Sam Bush & Alan Munde, "Poor Richards Almanac", American Heritage AH401-25 (1968). Ridge Runner, RRR 0002 (1976)
- Alan Munde, "Alan Munde Plays Bluegrass", Cambridge 8607 (1971)
- Alan Munde, "Banjo Sandwich", Ridge Runner, RRR 0001 (1975)
- Sam Bush & Alan Munde, "Together again for the first time", Ridge Runner, RRR 0007, (1977)
- Alan Munde, "The banjo kid picks again", Ridge Runner, RRR 0022 (1980)
- Alan Munde, "Festival favorites, Volume 1", Ridge Runner, RRR 0026 (1980)
- Alan Munde, "Festival favorites, Volume 2", Ridge Runner, RRR 0027 (1980)
- Alan Munde, "Festival favorites, Nashville sessions", Ridge Runner, RRR 0031 (1982)
- Alan Munde, "Festival favorites, Southwest sessions", Ridge Runner, RRR 0032 (1983)
- Alan Munde, "In the Tradition", Ridge Runner, RRR 0035 (1986)
- Alan Munde & Joe Carr,"Texas Fiddle Favorites for Banjo", June Appal JA-001 '(1987). Mel Bay MELBY02984 (2000)
- Alan Munde, "Festival Favorites Revisited", Rounder Records, ROUN0311 (1993)
- Alan Munde, "Blue Ridge Express", Rounder Records, ROUN0301 (1994)
- Joe Carr & Alan Munde, "Windy Days and Dusty Skies", Flying Fish, FF 644 (1995)
- Alan Munde & Joe Carr, "Welcome to West Texas", Flying Fish, FF 669 (1998)
- Alan Munde, "Solo Banjo, Just Banjo, All Banjo, Nothing But Banjo", Mel Bay CPB-2002-CD (2002)
- Alan Munde & Wayne Shrubsall, "Old Friends", Mel Bay CBP-2003-CD (2003)
- Alan Munde, "Old bones", Munde's Child Records MCR-CD002 (2007)
- Alan Munde Gazette, "Made To Last", Munde's Child Records MCR-CD003(2008)
- Alan Munde & Adam Granger, "Dapple Patti", Jeep CD 2R1 (2012)
- Alan Munde & Billy Bright, "Bright Munde", Munde's Child Records MCR-CD004 (2014)
- Alan Munde & Billy Bright, "Es Mi Suert", Munde's Child Records MCR-CD005 (2018)
- Alan Munde "Excelsior" 15-titles streaming (2023)

=== As member of Country Gazette ===
- Country Gazette, "Traitor in Our Midst", United Artists Records, UAS 5596 (1972)
- Country Gazette, "Don't Give Up Your Day Job", United Artists Records, UAS 29491 (1973)
- Country Gazette, "Live at McCabe's 1974", UK: Transatlantic Records TRA 291 (1975)
- Country Gazette, "Out to Lunch", Flying Fish, FF 027 (1976)
- Country Gazette, "What a Way to Make a Living", Ridge Runner, RRR 0008 (1977)
- Country Gazette, "All This, and More Money, Too" Ridge Runner, RRR-0017 (1979)
- Country Gazette, "American and Clean", Flying Fish, FF 253 (1981)
- Country Gazette, "America's Bluegrass Band", Flying Fish, FF 295 (1983)
- Country Gazette, "Bluegrass Tonight", Flying Fish, FF 383 (1986)
- Country Gazette, "Strictly Instrumental", Flying Fish, FF 446 (1987)
- Alan Munde & Country Gazette, "Keep on Pushing", Flying Fish, FF 70561 (1991)

=== As sidemen or participant of an ephemeral group or compilation ===
- Jimmy Martin & the Sunny Mountain Boys, "Fly Me To Frisco", MCA Records MCA-435 (1970) - 2 tracks
- Jimmy Martin & the Sunny Mountain Boys, "Singing All Day And Dinner On The Ground", Decca, DL-75226 (1970) - 6 tracks
- Jimmy Martin & the Sunny Mountain Boys, "Jimmy Martin Sings I'd Like To Be Sixteen Again", Decca, DL-75343 (1972) - 5 tracks
- Gram Parsons – GP Reprise Records – MS 2123, 1973 song: "Still Feeling Blue". (alternate takes released in 2014 in: "180 Gram: Alternate Takes From GP And Grievous Angel" 2xLP Rhino Vinyl – 8122796131)
- The Flying Burrito Bros Live In Amsterdam" Netherlands : Philips 6641 144 (1972). Ariola 86 439 XCT (1973) (Country Gazette + Rick Roberts, Don Beck & Eric Dalton, recorded on January 14, 1972, at The Concertgebouw in Amsterdam, Netherlands) - 2014 reissue of the 19+5 tracks from the 2 previous references: "Flying Burrito Brothers Live In Amsterdam 1972", Liberation Hall – LIB-5170 (2x vinyles, CD or digital album)
- The New Kentucky Colonels, "Live in Sweden 1973", Rounder, 0073 (1976). Roland White Music, RW0003 (2016) — Live at the Mosebacke Club, Stockholm, Sweden May 28 and 29, 1973.
- Roland White, "I Wasn't Born to Rock 'n Roll" Ridge Runner RRR0005, (1976).
- Slim Richey's Jazz Grass "Jazz Grass" Ridge Runner RRR0009 (1977) Night In Tunisia (feat. Bill Keith, Alan Munde Joe Carr, Sam Bush)
- Dave Ferguson And His Friends – Somewhere Over The Rainbow And Other Fiddle Tunes, (tracks : A1 to B5), Ridge Runner – RRR0003, (1976).
- Dan Huckabee – Why Is This Man Smiling (tracks: A1 to A3, A5, B3, B4), Ridge Runner – RRR0004 (1976).
- Byron Berline – Dad's Favorites - Rounder Records – 0100 (1977).
- Country Store (Jimmy Gaudreau), "Country Store Live!", Ridge Runner RRR0012 (1977) Recorded at Bill Grant's Salt Creek Park Bluegrass Festival, Hugo, Oklahoma 1973.
- Stone Mountain Boys – Stone Mountain Boys Reunion Album (tracks: A1, B2 to B4, B7), Ridge Runner – RRR0015 (1978).
- Dan Huckabee – Acoustic Steel (tracks: A1, A5, B2, B3, B5), Ridge Runner – RRR-0023 (1980).
- Joe Carr Otter Nonsense Ridge Runner – RRR-0024 (1980).
- Bob Clark – One Legged Gypsy (tracks: B1 to B5), Ridge Runner RRR 0025, (1980).
- Byron Berline – Jumpin' The Strings tracks: 1,11,13, with Joe Carr), Sugar Hill Records (2) – SH-CD-3787, (1990).
- Various Artists, "Knee Deep in Bluegrass: The AcuTab Sessions", Rebel Records, (2000)
- Rod Moag – Ah-Haa! Goes Grass: A Bluegrass Tribute To Bob Wills - TexTracs – 001 CD, Compilation, (2000).
- Various Artists, "Long Journey Home: Bluegrass Songs of the Stanley Brothers", Rounder Records, ROUN0349 (2002).
