= Slim Richey =

American musician

- Birth name: David Michael Richey
- Also known as: Slim Richey
- Born: February 11, 1938; Atlanta, Texas
- Died: May 31, 2015 (aged 77); Kyle, Texas
- Genres: jazz swing
- Occupation(s): Musician, bandleader, record label owner
- Instrument(s): Guitar, fiddle
- Years active: 1960–2015
- Labels: Ridge Runner, Tex-Grass

David Michael Richey (February 11, 1938 – May 31, 2015), known professionally as Slim Richey, was an American jazz guitarist, fiddle player, bandleader, and publisher.

== Early life ==
Richey was born in Atlanta, Texas, and became a jazz enthusiast at an early age, starting a swing band in high school. He went to college at the University of Oklahoma, studying with Benny Garcia and taking up the style of jazz guitar playing epitomized by Hank Garland, Barney Kessel, and Wes Montgomery.

== Business and publishing career ==
In the 1970s and '80s, Richey ran Warehouse Music, a mail order company that offered a full range of musical instruments and equipment, acting in many cases as a distributor for factory-licensed dealers in Fender, Gibson, and other brands, and selling them at a generous discount. Eventually pressure from manufacturers resulted in the elimination of a number of these brands. The company also sold a number of folk instruments under Richey's own Ridge Runner brand and marketed instructional materials for students of bluegrass music.

The company developed one of the first commercially-produced variable speed tape machines designed to assist in transcribing recorded music. These were quite costly at the time, and lacked the precision that is available now with inexpensive software, but were well received by transcriptionists at the time.

Richey also ran a number of record labels, most memorable being Ridge Runner Records. Specializing primarily in acoustic music from Texas and Oklahoma, the label produced some groundbreaking projects which are still cherished and studied today. Among those were early records from Sam Bush and Alan Munde (solo and as a team), Country Gazette, Roland White, Buck White, Marty Stuart, Joe Carr, Bill Lister, and others.

In 1977 Slim Richey recorded "Jazz Grass," an album of mostly bluegrass musicians forsaking their mountain roots to play more harmonically-sophisticated jazz. Richey was featured on guitar. Alan Munde, Bill Keith, and Gerald Jones played banjo; Richard Greene, Ricky Skaggs, and Sam Bush were on fiddle; Joe Carr and Kerby Stewart played mandolin; and Dan Huckabee was on dobro. Tracks included interpretations of jazz standards Stompin' at the Savoy and A Night in Tunisia next to Richey's originals.

== Later years ==
Richey moved to Driftwood, near Austin in 1992 and was a fixture of the local music scene for over 20 years. He often performed at Old Settler's Music Festival and the Kerrville Folk Festival. He also played at the Django Reinhardt Festival in Fort Worth, Texas, with Slim Richey's Stray Gypsies.

He was known for encouraging Austin's young musicians, including Kat Edmonson, who was 22 when she met Richey in 2005.

In 2012 he was left unconscious after being hit by an SUV hit-and-run driver. Upon recovering, he sold a tee-shirt that read "Takes a lickin' and keeps on pickin".

In 2013 his band Jitterbug Vipers released Phoebes Dream, an album of original tunes written in style of the 1940s jazz swing era, and featuring lyrical references to the 1940s Hipster jazz scene which historically includes references to marijuana, a legal drug during prohibition.

In 2014 Richey and the Jitterbug Vipers were featured on Michael Feinstein's NPR show Song Travels.

Richey won Best Electric Guitarist at the 2014 Austin Music Awards.

== Death ==
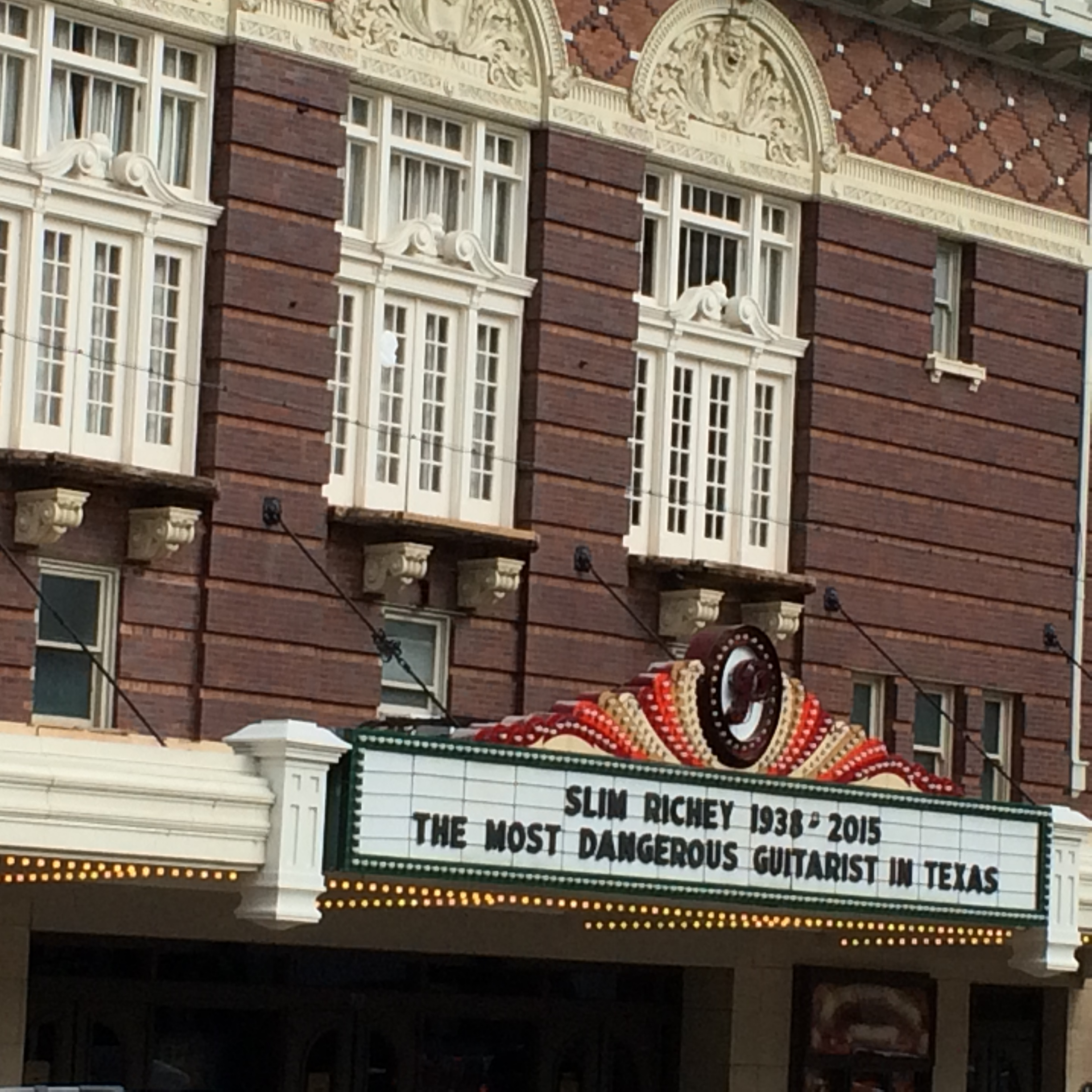
Paramount Marquee for Slim

Richey died of lymphoma on May 31, 2015, in Dripping Springs near Austin, Texas.

== See also ==
- Music of Austin
- Old Settler's Music Festival
- South Padre International Music Festival
