= Unleashed (Nashville Bluegrass Band album) =

Studio album by Nashville Bluegrass Band
- Released: October 1995
- Genre: Bluegrass music
- Length: 34:32
- Label: Sugar Hill
- Producer: Jerry Douglas

Professional ratings
Review scores
Source	Rating
Allmusic	3/5 stars

Unleashed is an album by the Nashville Bluegrass Band, released through Sugar Hill Records in October 1995. In 1996, the album won the group the Grammy Award for Best Bluegrass Album.

== Track listing ==
1. "Tear My Stillhouse Down" (Welch) – 2:27
2. "Dark Shadows of Night" (Wigley, Wilbur) – 3:09
3. "Boll Weevil" (traditional) – 2:10
4. "Last Time on the Road" (Jones) – 2:46
5. "I Got a Date" (Allen, Bays) – 2:40
6. "Blackbirds and Crows" (Humphries) – 2:47
7. "One More Dollar" (Rawlings, Welch) – 2:58
8. "Doorstep of Trouble" (Hadley) – 2:11
9. "You Wouldn't Know Love" (Dowling, Handley) – 3:30
10. "Dog Remembers Bacon" (Duncan, OBryant) – 2:19
11. "Little White Washed Chimney" (Clifton) – 2:22
12. "Almost" (Allen, Stinson) – 2:12
13. "Last Month of the Year" (Fairfield Four) – 3:01

== Personnel ==
- Jerry Douglas – producer
- Stuart Duncan – fiddle, vocal harmony
- Pat Enright – guitar, vocals, vocal harmony
- Brad Hartman – engineer
- Bradley Hartman – engineer
- Gene Libbea – bass, vocal harmony
- Nashville Bluegrass Band – arranger
- Alan O'Bryant – banjo, vocals, vocal harmony
- Roland White – mandolin, vocals, vocal harmony
