= Sierra Records =

American independent record label

- Founded: 1977; 49 years ago
- Founder: John Delgatto
- Genre: Acoustic, bluegrass, country rock, folk rock
- Country of origin: U.S.
- Location: Etiwanda, California

Sierra Records is an independent record label based in Etiwanda, California.

== History ==
Sierra Records founder John Delgatto first launched Briar Records, which released folk and bluegrass music by artists including Leslie Keith; the Doc Watson Family, Toulouse Engelhardt, the Bluegrass Cardinals, Earl Collins, and the Kentucky Colonels.

In 1977, Delgatto founded Sierra Records to issue recordings by members and ex-members of The Byrds, new music by other artists, and reissues of archival recordings. Initially, Delgatto released albums under the Sierra/Briar label.

Sierra Records gained wide recognition in 1982 with the release of the Gram Parsons and the Fallen Angels Live 1973 album, which received a Grammy nomination for Best Country Performance by a Duo/Group for the song "Love Hurts."

Through the years, Sierra Records has expanded by adding DVDs, books, and posters to their product line, by building a collection of rare material by licensing individual songs from other companies, and by releasing high-quality vinyl LPs under the Sierra High Fidelity imprint.

Sierra Records has significantly added to the depth of material available by artists such as Gram Parsons, Gene Clark, and Clarence White.

In 2019 Sierra Records was sold to 43 North Broadway LLC.

== Roster ==
- Skip Battin
- Bluegrass Etc.
- Gene Clark
- Shep Cooke
- Toulouse Engelhardt
- Country Gazette
- The Credibility Gap
- Doug Dillard
- Ever Call Ready
- Fox Family
- Steve Gillette
- Richard Greene
- Slavek Hanzlik
- The Hillmen
- Lynette Johnson
- George Jones
- Kentucky Colonels
- David Meltzer
- Muleskinner
- Nashville West
- Ray Park
- Parsons Green
- Gene Parsons and Meridian Green
- Gram Parsons
- The Reinsmen
- Phil Rosenthal
- Steve Spurgin
- Scotty Stoneman
- Clarence White

== See also ==
- List of record labels
