= Oklahoma International Bluegrass Festival =

Coordinates: 35°52′54″N 97°26′01″W

- Genre: Bluegrass music
- Location: Guthrie, Oklahoma
- Years active: 1996–present
- Founders: Byron Berline, Joe Hutchinson
- Website: Official web site

The Oklahoma International Bluegrass Festival is held annually in Guthrie, Oklahoma. The festival was founded as a nonprofit organization by Guthrie resident Byron Berline and Oklahoma state representative Joe Hutchinson in 1996. Each year the festival supports music education through music scholarships and other educational opportunities. The three-day festival draws over 15,000 participants.
