= Waitin' for the Hard Times to Go =

Studio album by Nashville Bluegrass Band
- Released: 1993
- Genre: Bluegrass music
- Length: 35:39
- Label: Sugar Hill
- Producer: Jerry Douglas

Professional ratings
Review scores
| Source | Rating |
|---|---|
| Allmusic | 5/5 stars |

Waitin' for the Hard Times to Go is an album by the Nashville Bluegrass Band, released through Sugar Hill Records in 1993. In 1994, the album won the group the Grammy Award for Best Bluegrass Album.

== Track listing ==
1. "Backtrackin'" (Mike Dowling) – 2:58
2. "Waitin' for the Hard Times to Go" (Ringer) – 3:16
3. "Kansas City Railroad Blues" – 3:57
4. "Open Pit Mine" (Gentry) – 3:03
5. "Train of Yesterday" – 3:33
6. "Father, I Stretch My Hands to Thee" (traditional) – 2:23
7. "When I Get Where I'm Goin'" (Allen) – 2:49
8. "Waltzing's for Dreamers" (Thompson) – 2:21
9. "I Ain't Goin' Down" – 2:30
10. "We Decided to Make Jesus Our Choice" (traditional) – 2:39
11. "On Again Off Again" (Allen) – 3:46
12. "Soppin' the Gravy" (traditional) – 2:24

== Personnel ==
- Dave Allen – Composer
- Jerry Douglas – Dobro, Producer
- Mike Dowling – Composer
- Stuart Duncan – Fiddle, Vocals, Baritone (Vocal)
- Pat Enright – Guitar, Vocals, Tenor (Vocal)
- D.T. Gentry – Composer
- David Glasser – Mastering
- Russell Lee – Photography
- Gene Libbea – Bass, Vocals, Baritone (Vocal), Tenor (Vocal)
- Holland MacDonald – Design
- Señor McGuire – Photography
- Alan O'Bryant – Banjo, Vocals, Tenor (Vocal)
- Jim Ringer – Composer
- Richard Thompson – Composer
- Bil VornDick – Engineer
- Roland White – Mandolin, Bass (Vocal), Vocals
