= Last of the Red Hot Burritos =

Live album by the Flying Burrito Brothers
- Released: May 1972
- Genre: Country rock
- Length: 34:45
- Label: A&M
- Producer: Jim Dickson

The Flying Burrito Brothers chronology
The Flying Burrito Brothers (1971)	Last of the Red Hot Burritos (1972)	Close Up the Honky-Tonks (1974)

Professional ratings
Review scores
Source	Rating
AllMusic	3.5/5 stars
Christgau's Record Guide	B

Last of the Red Hot Burritos is the fourth album by country rock group the Flying Burrito Brothers, released in 1972. By the time this album was recorded, "Sneaky" Pete Kleinow and Bernie Leadon had left the band, leaving Chris Hillman as the sole founding member. In their places, Hillman recruited Al Perkins and Kenny Wertz respectively. Wertz had previously played with Hillman in the Scottsville Squirrel Barkers. The band also added two guest musicians for their fall 1971 tour in Byron Berline and Roger Bush from Country Gazette. This lineup toured until Hillman left the band in October 1971, leaving the rights to the band's name to Rick Roberts. Once Hillman departed, A&M Records apparently lost faith in the group. Instead of allowing a Roberts-led version of the band (with no founding members) to record a new studio album, A&M released this live recording. It fulfilled the band's contract, but it was subsequently dropped from the label.

A group of Burritos led by Rick Roberts would continue to tour Europe with no original members into 1973 (to meet contractual obligations), at which point the band was officially dissolved by Roberts, bringing the original Flying Burrito Brothers to an end. (A new version of the Burritos would resurface in 1975, signed to Columbia Records.)

== Chart performance ==
The album debuted on Billboard magazine's Top LP's & Tape chart in the issue dated June 3, 1972, peaking at No. 171 during a seven-week run on the chart.

== Track listing ==
Side one
No.	Title	Writer(s)	Length
1.	"Christine's Tune (A.K.A. Devil in Disguise)"	Chris Hillman, Gram Parsons	3:54
2.	"Six Days on the Road"	Earl Green, Carl Montgomery	3:03
3.	"My Uncle"	Chris Hillman, Gram Parsons	2:20
4.	"Dixie Breakdown"	Jimmie Lunceford, Don Reno	2:17
5.	"Don't Let Your Deal Go Down"	Louise Certain, Gladys Stacey Flatt, Jerry Organ, Wayne Walker	2:20
6.	"Orange Blossom Special"	Ervin T. Rouse	3:39

Side two
No.	Title	Writer(s)	Length
1.	"Ain't That a Lot of Love"	Homer Banks, Deanie Parker	3:20
2.	"High Fashion Queen"	Chris Hillman, Gram Parsons	3:22
3.	"Don't Fight It"	Wilson Pickett, Steve Cropper	2:56
4.	"Hot Burrito #2"	Chris Ethridge, Gram Parsons	4:35
5.	"Losing Game"	James Carr, Dennis Weaver	2:59

Bonus tracks on the 2008 Sierra Records reissue:

- "Wake Up Little Susie" (Felice and Boudleaux Bryant) – 3:29
- "Money Honey" (Jesse Stone) – 3:20
- "One Hundred Years from Now" (Gram Parsons) – 2:35

== Personnel ==
reference for personnel section:

The Flying Burrito Brothers

- Chris Hillman - vocals, bass, mandolin
- Rick Roberts - vocals, rhythm guitar
- Al Perkins - pedal steel guitar, lead electric guitar
- Kenny Wertz - vocals, guitar, banjo
- Michael Clarke - drums

guests:

- Byron Berline - fiddle
- Roger Bush - acoustic bass, acoustic guitar (overdubbed) on "Orange Blossom Special", lead vocal on "Don't Let Your Deal Go Down"
- Earl P. Ball or Spooner Oldham - piano (overdubbed) on "High Fashion Queen" and "Losing Game"
- Bernie Leadon (possible) - guitar (overdubbed)
