= Kindling (album) =

Studio album by Gene Parsons
- Released: August 1973
- Recorded: 1973 at Warner Bros. Recording Studios, North Hollywood
- Genre: Country rock; bluegrass
- Length: 27:02
- Label: Warner Bros.
- Producer: Russ Titelman

Gene Parsons chronology
Kindling (1973)	Melodies (1979)

Professional ratings
Review scores
Source	Rating
Allmusic	4/5 stars

Kindling is the debut solo album by country rock musician Gene Parsons recorded in 1973. Guest musicians on this album include former Byrds bandmate Clarence White, plus Vassar Clements, Ralph Stanley, Bill Payne, and Gib Guilbeau.

== Track listing ==
1. "Monument" (Gene Parsons) – 2:06
2. "Long Way Back" (Gene Parsons) – 2:29
3. "Do Not Disturb" (Skip Battin, Kim Fowley) – 1:55
4. "Willin'" (Lowell George) – 3:18
5. "On the Spot" (Gene Parsons, Clarence White, Gib Guilbeau) – 1:38
6. "Take a City Bride" (Gib Guilbeau) – 2:17
7. "Sonic Bummer" (Gene Parsons) – 2:18
8. "I Must Be a Tree" (Gene Parsons, Gib Guilbeau) – 3:17
9. "Drunkard's Dream" (Ralph Stanley) – 2:37
10. "Banjo Dog" (Gene Parsons) – 2:10
11. "Back Again" (Gene Parsons) – 2:57

== Personnel ==
- Gene Parsons - guitar, bass, banjo, drums, harmonica, auto harp, percussion, vocals
- Clarence White - guitar, mandolin
- Vassar Clements - violin
- Gib Guilbeau - rhythm guitar, fiddle
- Roger Bush (musician) - bass
- Bill Payne - keyboards
- Nick DeCaro - accordion
- Ralph Stanley - tenor vocal
- Red Callender - tuba
- Andy Newmark - drums

== Production ==
- Producer: Russ Titelman
- Recording Engineer: Lee Herschberg, Donn Landee, Bobby Hata
- Art Direction: John and Barbara Cascado
- Photography: Greg Gorman
