= Ridge Runner Records =

Former record label

- Parent company: Richey Records
- Founded: 1976
- Founder: Slim Richey
- Genre: Bluegrass, country
- Country of origin: U.S.
- Location: Fort Worth, Texas

Ridge Runner Records was a record label based in Fort Worth, Texas, specializing in acoustic music from Texas and Oklahoma. Ridge Runner was one of the first labels to release and market bluegrass music in the southwestern U.S.

== History ==
While operating Warehouse Music in Fort Worth in the mid-1970s, selling guitars and musical equipment, Slim Richey began making records on his Ridge Runner label.

One of the first goals of Ridge Runner was to record and release albums by the banjo player Alan Munde, but the label branched out to other bluegrass and country musicians and groups.

Ridger Runner released Jazz Grass which featured bluegrass musicians playing jazz standards. The album had Richey and Sumter Bruton on guitar, Dan Huckabee on Dobro, Richard Greene, Ricky Skaggs and Sam Bush on fiddle, Joe Carr and Kerby Stewart on mandolin and Bill Keith, Gerald Jones and Alan Munde on banjo.

Other significant albums released by Ridge Runner include:

- Pre-Sequel by Alison Brown and Stuart Duncan was recorded when Alison had just graduated from high school.
- With A Little Help From My Friends by Marty Stuart was his first solo album, released in 1978 when he was 19 years old.

Ridge Runner also published Richey's bluegrass songbooks and music instruction videos.

Ridge Runner and its sister label Flying High Records were under the umbrella of Richey Records.

== Artists ==
Here is a partial list of artists who have released recordings on the Ridge Runner label:

- David Ferguson
- Richard Bailey
- Kenny Baker
- Bob Black
- Alison Brown & Stuart Duncan
- Sam Bush
- Joe Carr
- Bob Clark
- Country Gazette
- Country Store
- Fred Geiger
- Dan Huckabee
- Bill Knopf
- Muleskinner
- Alan Munde
- Slim Richey
- Roanoke
- Eddie Shelton
- Barry Solomon
- Wayne Stewart
- Stone Mountain Boys
- Marty Stuart
- Tennessee Gentlemen
- Buck White & The Down Home Folks
- Roland White
- Howard Yearwood

== See also ==
- List of record labels
