= Toulouse Engelhardt =

Acoustic Guitarist

Toulouse Engelhardt (born April 14, 1951, Milwaukee, Wisconsin) is an acoustic guitarist and the last member of the Takoma Seven, a group of fingerstyle guitarists who recorded for Takoma Records from 1959 to 1976. The group included John Fahey, Peter Lang, and Leo Kottke.

== Biography ==
Thomas Lloyd Engelhardt is the younger of two sons born to Alan and Arlene Engelhardt. He was born on April 14, 1951 in Milwaukee, Wisconsin. In 1953, his family relocated to the West Coast, initially settling in San Francisco, before moving south to Hermosa Beach, California. In 1956, they settled in Palos Verdes Estates, California, where Engelhardt graduated from Palos Verdes High School in 1969. Toulouse Engelhardt married Sally Georgeson in 1978, a British understudy from the Royal Ballet. They have two daughters, Lauren Talia and Lindsey Tayrn. His passion for the guitar began early, at age ten, when he first heard surf music.

Although he lacks formal training in guitar technique, he studied music theory and harmony in the early '70s while attending Utah State University. Engelhardt also received impromptu lessons from two renowned jazz guitarists of the 1960s: Wes Montgomery and Larry Carlton. His first guitar lesson was from Carlton, who taught him how to play "Walk, Don't Run" by The Ventures. In the summer of 1966, at the age of fifteen, Engelhardt received technical tips from Wes Montgomery while they were at the backstage door of the Lighthouse Café in Hermosa Beach.

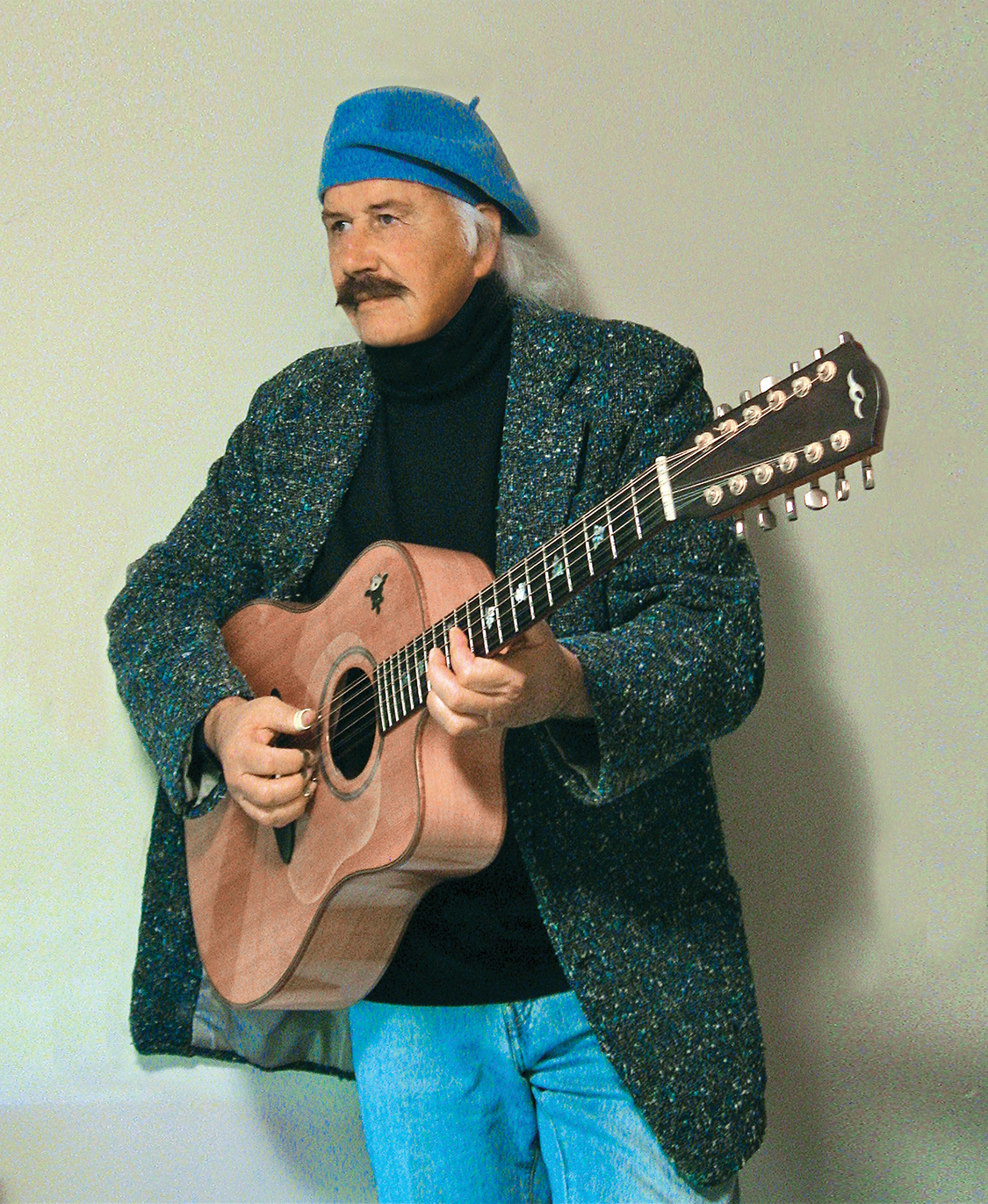

Engelhardt's break came in 1973 when he was booked as a support act for The Byrds' final American tour. In 1975, he signed with Briar Records, a subsidiary of Fahey's Takoma label. After the release of his first album, he became disillusioned with his experiences in the music industry and took a ten-year sabbatical. During this time, he returned to college to pursue two academic degrees in the natural sciences. In the early 1990s he earned a master's degree in botany from California State University, Fullerton. He has since served as an adjunct professor of biology at community colleges in Southern California.

Although Engelhardt left his solo career in those years, he played as a support act and occasional sideman for a range of notable artists, including Adrian Belew, Jack Bruce, Ry Cooder, Dick Dale, and David Lindley and many others. In 1994, Sierra Records in affiliation with Hollywood Records; a division of Walt Disney Productions Inc, reissued Toullusions. This led to Engelhardt's rediscovery by guitar fans, prompting his return to performing, composing and recording works for solo guitar.

Engelhardt's compositions are typically arranged for six-string or twelve-string guitar acoustic or Mosrite electric guitar, often written in a tone poem style. His music blends elements of folk music, acoustic blues, jazz, ragtime, and surf music.

Engelhardt has been recognized for his work in various ways, including a nomination for Best Acoustic Fingerstyle Guitarist in Guitar Player magazine's Reader's Poll. At the Virgin Islands Film Festival, he won a silver medal for his contribution to the soundtrack of "Winter Equinox". He was also awarded "Best Jazz Artist" at the Orange County Music Awards. More recently, he has been featured in several prominent "Best of the best" guitar fandom articles, including "100 Gifted Guitarists-You Should Know" (TrueFire.webarchive) and "100 Greatest Finger Style Guitarist 2018" (entertainment.expertscolumn.com).

== Discography ==
- Toullusions Sierra/Briar/Takoma, 1976)
- Winter Equinox (Festival, 1978)
- Toullusions (Hollywood, 1994)
- Acoustic Guitar Highlights Vol. 3 (Solid Air, 1995)
- A Child's Guide to Einstein (Lost Grove Arts, 2004)
- Martian Lust (Lost Grove Arts, 2006)
- Lubbock Lights EP (Lost Grove Arts, 2008)
- Perpendicular Worlds (Lost Grove Arts, 2009)
- Acoustic Guitar Highlights (Solid Air, 2011)
- Toulousology (Lost Grove Arts, 2012)
- Mind Gardens (Lost Grove Arts, 2015)
- Three Novellas for Guitar and Orchestra (Five & Dime Universe Inc, 2023), feat. music director, Christopher M. Allport
- Music from the Martian Gras (Five and Dime Universe Inc, 2026), mastered by Christopher M. Allport
