= Nashville Bluegrass Band =

American bluegrass band

- Origin: Nashville, Tennessee, United States
- Genre: Bluegrass
- Years active: 1984–present
- Members: Alan O'Bryant; Mike Compton; Stuart Duncan; Andy Todd
- Past members: Pat Enright; Mark Hembree; Gene Libbea - bass; Roland White - mandolin; Dennis Crouch - bass
- Website: nashvillebluegrassband.net

The Nashville Bluegrass Band is an American bluegrass music ensemble founded in 1984.

The group's members first played together in 1984 as a backing band for Vernon Oxford and Minnie Pearl; each of the members was an established musician from the Nashville bluegrass community. They signed to Rounder Records and recorded their Béla Fleck-produced debut, My Native Home, in 1985. Incorporating elements of black gospel and spirituals, then a rarity in bluegrass, they became critical and popular successes both in America and abroad. The group toured in some 20 countries and were the first bluegrass band to ever play in China.

The group continued to record for Rounder and Sugar Hill into the 1990s; two of the albums, 1993's Waitin' for the Hard Times to Go and 1995's Unleashed, won Grammy Awards for Best Bluegrass Album. Other albums were nominated for Grammys in the same category in 1988, 1990, 1991, 1998, and 2004. After the departure of bassist Gene Libbea and mandolinist Roland White in 1998, the group went on a brief hiatus, but after vocalist Pat Enright sang as one of the Soggy Bottom Boys from O Brother, Where Art Thou?, the group's career had a revival. They played as the backing group for many performers on the Down from the Mountain tour and album, and toured again on their own in the 2000s.

Guitarist and founding member Pat Enright died on August 18, 2026 at age 81. No cause of death was immediately given. The band were inducted into the International Bluegrass Music Hall of Fame in 2026.

== Members ==
Current members

- Alan O'Bryant - banjo, vocals
- Mike Compton - mandolin
- Stuart Duncan - fiddle
- Andy Todd - bass

Past members

- Pat Enright - guitar, vocals
- Mark Hembree - bass
- Gene Libbea - bass
- Roland White - mandolin
- Dennis Crouch - bass

== Discography ==
Released	Title	Label	Number	Notes
1985	My Native Home	Rounder	0212	LP
1986	Idle Time	Rounder	0232	LP
1987	To Be His Child	Rounder	0242	gospel LP, reissued on CD
1988	New Moon Rising	Sugar Hill	CD 3762	Grammy nominee, with Peter Rowan
1990	The Boys Are Back in Town	Sugar Hill	CD 3778	Grammy nominee
1991	The Nashville Bluegrass Band	Rounder	CD 0232	CD compiled from My Native Home and Idle Time LPs
1991	Home of the Blues	Sugar Hill	CD 3793	Grammy nominee
1993	Waitin' for the Hard Times to Go	Sugar Hill	CD 3809	Grammy winner
1995	Unleashed	Sugar Hill	CD 3843	Grammy winner. Some sources list the pre-release title as Still Unplugged
1998	American Beauty	Sugar Hill	CD 3882	Grammy nominee
2004	Twenty Year Blues	Sugar Hill	CD 3959	Grammy nominee
2007	Best of the Sugar Hill Years	Sugar Hill	CD 4036	compilation, 1990–2004
