= Billy Ray Latham =

American banjo player (1938–2018)

- Born: January 12, 1938; Wild Cat Corner, Arkansas, U.S.
- Died: August 19, 2018 (aged 80); Nashville, Tennessee, U.S.
- Occupations: Actor, Musician
- Years active: 1958–2018

Billy Ray Latham (January 12, 1938, Arkansas – August 19, 2018, Nashville, TN) was an American banjo player. He was best known as a member of the Kentucky Colonels (1961-c.1974). He then joined The Dillards in 1974, and left c.1978.

He died in 2018, having been in poor health for years.
