= Scotty Stoneman =

American bluegrass and country fiddler

Calvin Scott "Scotty" Stoneman (1932–1973) was an American bluegrass and country fiddler, five-time National Fiddle Champion and a member of the Bluegrass Champs, the Kentucky Colonels, and the Stoneman Family band. He was one of 23 children of Ernest Stoneman and Hattie Frost Stoneman.

Noted for his wild, improvisational style, Stoneman originally learned to play from his maternal grandfather Bill Frost, a traditional fiddler from southwest Virginia. Growing up in the Maryland suburbs, he played in an early incarnation of the Stoneman Family band called "Pop Stoneman and the Little Pebbles" and then formed the Bluegrass Champs, which included his sisters, Roni and Donna and his brothers Jimmy and Van, along with Porter Church. Success in the Washington, DC, area led to a guest spot on the Grand Ole Opry show in 1962, and an eventual move to Nashville. Stoneman left his family band in 1964 to join the Kentucky Colonels. He was praised by rock musician Jerry Garcia of the Grateful Dead, who referred to him as "the bluegrass Charlie Parker."

Having struggled with alcoholism throughout his life, Stoneman stopped playing music in the early '70s in an attempt to quit drinking. After a period of sobriety, he died in March 1973 of alcohol poisoning.
