= Cluster Pluckers =

American musical group

The Cluster Pluckers are a quartet of harmony singer-songwriters and country music instrumentalists. The group formed in 1980. The original and remaining members are Margaret Bailey, Kris Ballinger and Dale Ballinger, later joined by Mark Howard. The group has its own backup trio of bluegrass instrumentalists, humorously named "Them Other Pluckers", consisting of Brent Truitt on mandolin, Blaine Sprouse on fiddle and Richard Bailey on banjo, all of whom have toured and recorded with a wide range of bluegrass and country artists.

== History ==
In the spring of 1980, the trio of Bailey and the Ballingers Margaret first sang together at a pickin' party. They were then joined by fiddler Frazier Moss.

They performed at the Folklife Festival Exhibition during the 1982 World's Fair in Knoxville, Tennessee.

In 1984 the Ballingers performed with fiddler Junior Daughtery at Carnegie Hall as part of a special American Folk Roots Concert Series.

In 1986 Kris and Bailey sang vocal harmony with Vassar Clements' Hillbilly Jazz Band, on two of the group's albums and on national tour, then performed on The Nashville Network television shows Nashville Now and New Country.

The television exposure introduced them to Chet Atkins, with whom they then co-wrote the tongue-in-cheek song "Would Jesus Wear a Rolex?", which became a minor hit for Ray Stevens, reaching No. 41 on the country chart in 1987, and was nominated for a Grammy Award.

In 1987 Mark Howard joined the trio. Howard is a multi-instrumentalist and recording artist who featured with many country stars, for whom he has also done engineering and production work, as well as writing string arrangements for the Nashville Symphony and others.

In 1989, they appeared on John Hartford's album Down on the River.

The Cluster Pluckers recorded four albums on their own label, CPR (Cluster Plucker Records...Music Good for the Heart

In 1991 they appeared on the PBS music television program Austin City Limits, along with Atkins.

Other television appearances included:

- American Music Shop
- The Statler Brothers Easter Special
- Reno's Old Time Music Festival
- A Cluster Plucker Christmas
- Songs of the Civil War

In 1995, their album Unplucked featured Johnny Cash on the song, "Where the Soul Never Dies".

On radio, the Cluster Pluckers have been featured on:

- Rider's Radio Theater, on National Public Radio with Riders in the Sky

In the 1990s the group performed at a fundraiser event for Bill Clinton and Al Gore at the Opryland Hotel in Nashville, Tennessee, and also for Tipper Gore's Birthday Bash at the Ryman Auditorium in Nashville, Tennessee.

The group and performs internationally.

== Discography ==
- The Cluster Pluckers, (CPR)
- Just Pluck It! (CPR)
- Unplucked, (CPR, 1995)
- A Cluster Plucker Christmas Album (CPR)
- Old Time Gospel Favorites (Chapel Records)
- The All Nite Gang – Bluegrass From Nashville, (collaboration of Various Artists, Rebel Records)
