= Roland White =

American bluegrass music artist (1938–2022)

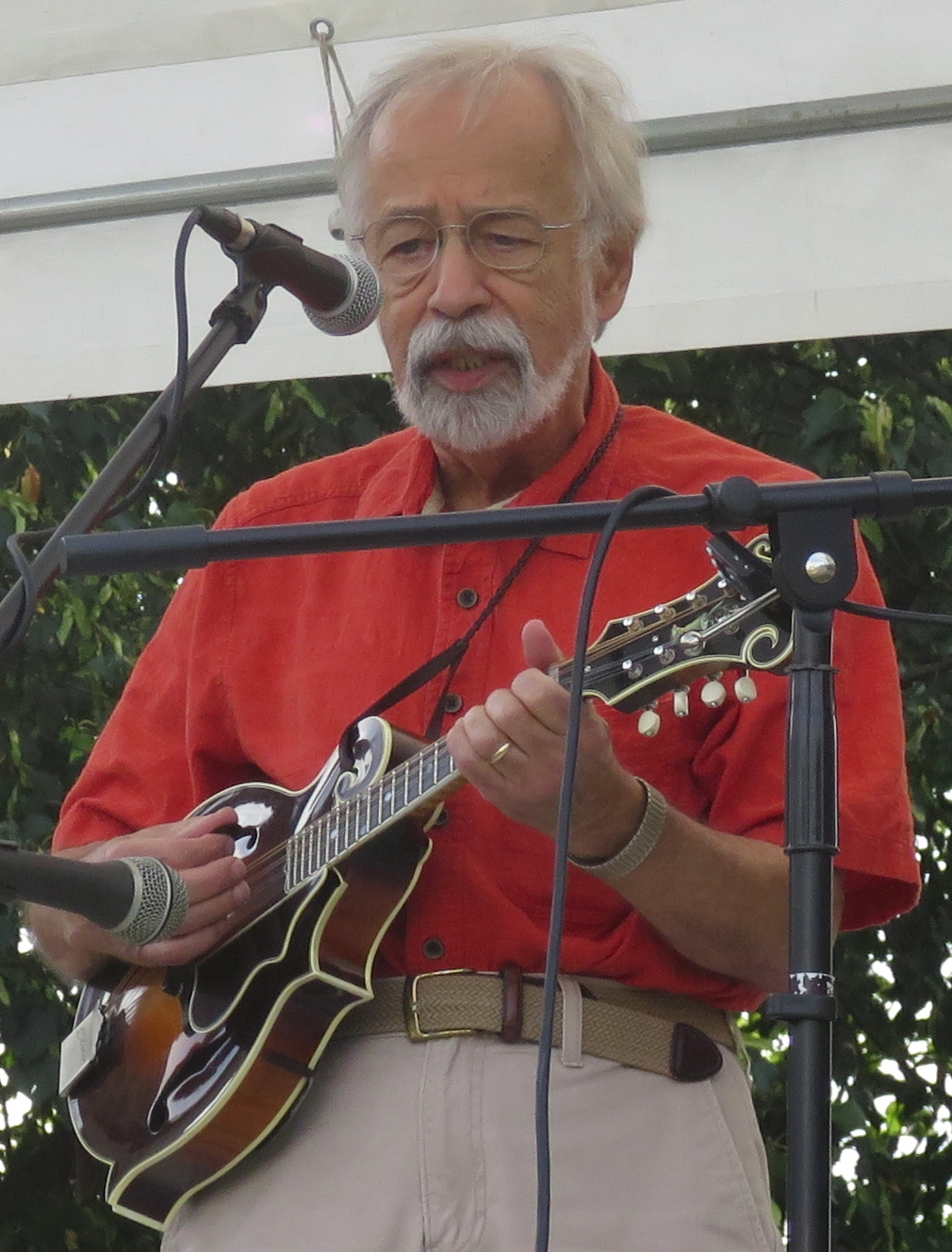
- Roland White, The New Kentucky Colonels Revival, 2014

Background information
- Born: Roland Joseph LeBlanc; April 23, 1938; Madawaska, Maine, U.S.
- Died: April 1, 2022 (aged 83) Nashville, Tennessee, U.S.
- Occupation: Musician
- Instruments: Mandolin, guitar
- Formerly of: Kentucky Colonels, Blue Grass Boys, Nashville Grass, Country Gazette, Nashville Bluegrass Band, Roland White Band
- Website: www.rolandwhite.com

Roland Joseph White (né LeBlanc; April 23, 1938 – April 1, 2022) was an American bluegrass music artist, performing principally on the mandolin. He was inducted into the International Bluegrass Music Hall of Fame in 2017.

== Biography ==
White was born in Madawaska, Maine, on April 23, 1938, as Roland Joseph LeBlanc, and grew up speaking French. He was of French-Canadian descent. At an early age, White formed himself, his two brothers (Eric and Clarence) and his sister (Joanne) into a bluegrass band which performed locally. When the family moved to California, the group won a talent show on a local radio station, after which a television station hired them (minus Joanne) as The Country Boys.

After a two-year US Army enlistment, White re-joined the Country Boys, now renamed The Kentucky Colonels. In 1967, he had the opportunity to join the Blue Grass Boys, the backup band of his childhood idol Bill Monroe. He contributed to nine cuts with this band. He stayed with that group until 1969, when he joined the Nashville Grass, the new backup band of Lester Flatt. White stayed with Flatt until 1973, when he, Clarence and Eric re-united as The New Kentucky Colonels. This only lasted a few months; he and Clarence were struck by an automobile as they loaded their equipment into their car after a performance. Roland White suffered a dislocated shoulder, but Clarence died in the accident.

White then joined the progressive bluegrass group Country Gazette, staying with them for 13 years. In 1987, he joined the Nashville Bluegrass Band, staying with that group until 2000. After that he formed the Roland White Band, which was still active until his death.

White was a noted mandolin teacher who gave many workshops and private lessons and published book/CD instruction sets. Roland White died on April 1, 2022, at the age of 83 from complications of a heart attack.

== Discography ==
=== Solo albums ===
- 1976: I Wasn't Born To Rock'n Roll (Ridge Runner) reissued in 2010 by Tompkins Square
- 1994: Trying To Get To You (Sugar Hill)
- 2003: Jelly On My Tofu (Copper Creek) with the Roland White Band
- 2014: Straight-Ahead Bluegrass (Roland White Music) with the Roland White Band
- 2018: A Tribute to the Kentucky Colonels (Mountain Home) Roland White And Friends

=== Collaborations ===
- 1964: Dobro Country (World Pacific) with Tut Taylor and Clarence White
- 2018: Jim Lauderdale & Roland White (recorded 1979) (Sky Crunch Productions, Inc./Yep Roc Records)

=== With the Kentucky Colonels ===
- 1964: Appalachian Swing! (World Pacific)
- 1975: Livin' In The Past (Polygram) live recordings 1961-1965
- 1976: 1965-1966 (Rounder) compiled privately recorded live sessions
- 1978: 1966 (Shiloh)
- 1984: On Stage (Rounder)
- 1991: Long Journey Home (Vanguard) recorded July 1964 at the Newport Folk Festival
- 2003: Live in Stereo (FGM) 1965 Vancouver concert

=== With the New Kentucky Colonels ===
- 2012: Live in Holland 1973 (Roland White Music)
- 2016: Live in Sweden 1973 (Roland White Music)

=== With Country Gazette ===
- 1976: Out To Lunch (Flying Fish)
- 1976: Country Gazette Live (Antilles)
- 1977: What a Way To Make a Living (Ridge Runner)
- 1979: All This, and More Money, Too (Ridge Runner)
- 1981: American and Clean (Flying Fish)
- 1982: America's Bluegrass Band (Flying Fish)
- 1986: Bluegrass Tonight (Flying Fish)
- 1987: Strictly Instrumental (Flying Fish)
- 1991: Hello Operator...This is Country Gazette (Flying Fish)

=== With The Nashville Bluegrass Band ===
- 1990: The Boys Are Back in Town (Sugar Hill)
- 1991: Home of The Blues (Sugar Hill)
- 1993: Waitin' for the Hard Times to Go (Sugar Hill)
- 1995: Unleashed (Sugar Hill)
- 1998: American Beauty (Sugar Hill)

=== Also appears on ===
- 1969: Joe Greene - Joe Greene's Fiddle Album (County)
- 1971: Lester Flatt and Mac Wiseman - Lester 'N' Mac (RCA Victor)
- 1971: Lester Flatt - Flatt on Victor (RCA Victor)
- 1972: Lester Flatt - Foggy Mountain Breakdown (RCA Victor)
- 1972: Lester Flatt and Mac Wiseman - On The South Bound (RCA Victor)
- 1972: Lester Flatt - Kentucky Ridgerunner (RCA)
- 1973: Lester Flatt - Country Boy Featuring Feudin' Banjos (RCA)
- 1973. Lester Flatt and Mac Wiseman - Over the Hills to the Poorhouse (RCA)
- 1975: Alan Munde - Alan Munde's Banjo Sandwich (Ridge Runner)
- 1976: Dave Ferguson and his Friends - Somewhere Over the Rainbow and Other Fiddle Tunes (Ridge Runner)
- 1976: Dan Huckabee - Why Is This Man Smiling (Ridge Runner)
- 1977: Charlie Hardiman - On The Well-Beaten Path To Bluegrass (Hillside)
- 1977: Butch Robins - Forty Years Late (Rounder)
- 1977: Buck White and the Down Home Folks - That Down Home Feeling (Ridge Runner)
- 1978: Bobby Hicks - Texas Crapshooter (County)
- 1978: Paul Warren with Lester Flatt and The Nashville Grass - America's Greatest Breakdown Fiddle Player (CMH)
- 1980: Joe Carr - Otter Nonsense (Ridge Runner)
- 1980: Alan Munde - The Banjo Kid Picks Again (Ridge Runner)
- 1981: Blaine Sprouse - Summertime (Rounder)
- 1983: The Dreadful Snakes - Snakes Alive! (Rounder)
- 1988: Glen Duncan - Sweetwater (Turquoise)
- 1990: Doc Watson - On Praying Ground (Sugar Hill)
- 1991: David Grier - Freewheeling (Rounder)
- 1992: Stuart Duncan - Stuart Duncan (Rounder)
- 1992: Marty Stuart - Let There Be Country (Sony Music)
- 1994: Gene Wooten - Sings & Plays Dobro (Pinecastle)
- 1995: Clint Black - Looking for Christmas (RCA)
- 1995: Joe Carr and Alan Munde - Windy Days and Dusty Skies (Flying Fish)
- 1996: Leroy Mack - Leroy Mack & Friends (Rebel)
- 1996: Bernadette Peters - I'll Be Your Baby Tonight (Angel)
- 1998: Valerie Smith - Patchwork Heart (Rebel)
- 2000: Kazuhiro Inaba - Dixie Dream (Copper Creek)
- 2000: Valerie Smith - Turtle Wings (Rebel)
- 2002: Ricky Skaggs and Friends - Sing The Songs Of Bill Monroe (Lyric Street)
- 2004: Clint Black - Christmas with You (Equity)
- 2007: Ry Cooder - My Name Is Buddy (Nonesuch)
- 2010: Skip Battin - Topanga Skyline (Sierra)

== See also ==
- Marty Stuart

== Relevant literature ==
- Black, Bob. Mandolin Man: The Bluegrass Life of Roland White. University of Illinois Press, 2022.
