= Country Gazette (band) =

American country rock/bluegrass band (1971–1991)

- Genres: Country rock; progressive bluegrass
- Years active: 1971–1991
- Past members: Byron Berline; Roger Bush; Kenny Wertz; Alan Munde; Roland White

Country Gazette was an American country rock and progressive bluegrass band, formed in 1971 by Byron Berline and Roger Bush. They played traditional bluegrass and contemporary songs on acoustic instruments.

== Biography ==
When the members of the country rock ensemble Dillard & Clark went their separate ways in 1971, bluegrass fiddler Byron Berline and guitarist/bass player Roger Bush formed the band Country Gazette. Guitarist Kenny Wertz and banjo player Alan Munde soon joined. Herb Pedersen wrote songs and was a guest artist on Country Gazette records, but did not tour with the band.

=== A Traitor in our Midst ===
Country Gazette recorded their first album A Traitor in our Midst in 1972, produced by Jim Dickson. Herb Pedersen, Skip Conover, and Chris Smith were guest artists.

The Sierra Records compilation Silver Meteor (released in 1980 and reissued with additional tracks in 2010) contained two unreleased songs from these sessions: "All His Children" and "The Great Filling Station Holdup."

=== Don't Give Up Your Day Job ===
After tours of Europe and the U.K., Country Gazette recorded their 1973 album Don't Give Up Your Day Job, again produced by Jim Dickson. Guests included Herb Pedersen, Clarence White, Leland Sklar, and Al Perkins.

=== Live ===
In 1973, Kenny Wertz left Country Gazette, and Roland White (mandolin, guitar) joined up. Country Gazette released Live, an album recorded in November 1974 at McCabe's Guitar Shop in Santa Monica, California. The album was produced by Jim Dickson and released on the Transatlantic label. Skip Conover guested on dobro.

=== Out to Lunch ===
Byron Berline left Country Gazette in 1975, and soon Kenny Wertz returned, along with fiddler Dave Ferguson. They recorded the 1976 album Out to Lunch for Flying Fish (Ferguson was listed as a guest artist). Jim Dickson produced, and Al Perkins played pedal steel.

=== What a Way to Make a Living ===
Kenny Wertz, Dave Ferguson, and Roland White left the group. Alan Munde and Roland White were the only members of Country Gazette in 1977, when they recorded the album "What a Way to Make a Living" on the Ridge Runner record label. Guest musicians included Byron Berline, Skip Conover, Mike Richey, Richard Greene, and Bill Bryson.

=== From The Beginning ===
From the Beginning was released in 1978 by Sunset Records, located in London, England (Album SLS50414). In the band for this recording were Byron Berline, Roger Bush, Kenny Wertz and Alan Munde.

=== All This and Money Too ===
Joe Carr and Michael Anderson joined Country Gazette in 1978. The band released the album, All This and Money Too, in 1979, on Ridge Runner with guests Dave Ferguson, Slim Richey, Tommy Spurlock, Mike McCarty and Michael J. Dohoney.

=== American & Clean ===
Their next album American & Clean was produced by Slim Richey and featured guests Sam Bush, Dahrell Norris and Slim Richey. It was released in 1981 by Flying Fish Records.

=== America's Bluegrass Band ===
Michael Anderson left the band and was replaced by Gregg Kennedy and then Bill Smith. They recorded America's Bluegrass Band in Nashville with Herschel Freeman assisting in production.

=== Keep on Pushing ===
For the 1991 album Keep On Pushing, the Country Gazette line-up was Alan Munde (banjo), Dawn Watson (mandolin), Steve Garner (bass), and Dave Hardy (guitar).

=== Other projects ===
Country Gazette recorded several songs for the 1971 film Welcome Home, Soldier Boys, including "Further Along."

The members of Country Gazette joined the Flying Burrito Brothers to record their live album The Last of the Red Hot Burritos in 1972.

Byron Berline and Alan Munde were among those performing with Clarence White on April 4, 1973, at Bob Baxter's "Guitar Workshop" TV show. Video of this show was released by Sierra Records in 1998 as Together Again For the Last Time (later reissued on DVD as Clarence White: The Video).

Note: most Country Gazette members released solo and collaborative recordings which featured other Country Gazette members. This article does not attempt to list or describe these for the sake of repetition and article length.

== Discography ==
=== Albums ===
- 1972: A Traitor in our Midst! (United Artists)
- 1973: Don't Give Up Your Day Job (United Artists)
- 1975: Out to Lunch (released in 1976 by Ariola / Flying Fish), released in 1975 as The Sunny Side Of The Mountain by Transatlantic)
- 1975: Country Gazette Live (Antilles / Ariola / Transatlantic)
- 1977: What a Way to Make a Living (Ridge Runner)
- 1978: From The Beginning (Sunset Records)
- 1979: All This, and Money, Too (Ridge Runner)
- 1981: American and Clean (Flying Fish)
- 1982: America's Bluegrass Band (Flying Fish)
- 1986: Bluegrass Tonight (Flying Fish)
- 1987: Strictly Instrumental (Flying Fish)
- 1991: Keep On Pushing (Flying Fish) with Alan Munde

=== Compilations ===
- 1979: From the Beginning (United Artists) compilation of A Traitor in our Midst and Don't Give Up Your Day Job
- 1991: "Hello, Operator....This Is Country Gazette" (Flying Fish)
- 1995: Traitor In Our Midst / Don't Give Up Your Day Job (BGO)
- 2013: The Four Album Collection (Sierra Records) compiles Live at McCabe's, Out To Lunch, What a Way to Make a Living, and The Archives Album: Unreleased Rarities 1973-1977 (not otherwise released)

=== Singles ===
- 1972: "Keep on Pushin'" / "Hot Burrito Breakdown" (United Artists)
- 1972: "Swing Low Sweet Charriot" / "I Wish I Knew" (United Artists)
- 1972: "Sound of Goodbye" (United Artists)
- 1973: "Honky Cat" / "My Oklahoma" (United Artists)
- 1973: "My Oklahoma" / "Down the Road" (United Artists)
- 1973: "Teach Your Children"/ "Huckleberry Hornpipe" (United Artists)
- 1973: "Honky Cat" / "Down the Road" (United Artists)
