= Clarence White =

American musician (1944–1973)

- White in 1970

Background information
- Born: Clarence Joseph LeBlanc; June 7, 1944; Lewiston, Maine, U.S.
- Died: July 15, 1973 (aged 29) Palmdale, California, U.S.
- Genres: Bluegrass, country, country rock, rock
- Occupations: Musician, singer
- Instruments: Guitar, mandolin, vocals
- Years active: 1954–1973
- Labels: Sundown, Republic, Briar International, World Pacific, Bakersfield International, Columbia, Warner Bros.

Clarence White (born Clarence Joseph LeBlanc; June 7, 1944 – July 15, 1973) was an American bluegrass and country guitarist and singer. He was a member of the bluegrass ensemble the Kentucky Colonels and the rock band the Byrds, as well as a pioneer of country rock during the late 1960s. White worked extensively as a session musician, appearing on recordings by the Everly Brothers, Joe Cocker, Ricky Nelson, Pat Boone, the Monkees, Randy Newman, Gene Clark, Linda Ronstadt, Arlo Guthrie, and Jackson Browne among others.

Together with frequent collaborator Gene Parsons, he invented the B-Bender, a guitar accessory that enables a player to mechanically bend the B-string up a whole tone and emulate the sound of a pedal steel guitar. White was inducted into the International Bluegrass Music Association Hall of Fame in 2016, and again in 2019 as a member of the Kentucky Colonels.

== Early years ==
Clarence Joseph LeBlanc was born on June 7, 1944, in Lewiston, Maine. The LeBlanc family, who later changed their surname to White, were of French-Canadian ancestry and hailed from New Brunswick, Canada. Clarence's father, Eric LeBlanc Sr., played guitar, banjo, fiddle, and harmonica, ensuring that his offspring grew up surrounded by music. A child prodigy, Clarence began playing guitar at the age of six. At such a young age he was barely able to hold the instrument and as a result, he briefly switched to ukulele, awaiting a time when his young hands would be big enough to confidently grapple with the guitar.

In 1954, when Clarence was ten, the White family relocated to Burbank, California and soon after, Clarence joined his brothers Roland and Eric Jr. (who played mandolin and banjo respectively) in a trio called Three Little Country Boys. Although they initially started out playing contemporary country music, the group soon switched to a purely bluegrass repertoire, as a result of Roland's burgeoning interest in the genre.

In 1957, banjoist Billy Ray Latham and Dobro player LeRoy Mack were added to the line-up, with the band renaming themselves the Country Boys soon after. In 1961, the Country Boys also added Roger Bush on double bass, as a replacement for Eric White Jr. That same year, Clarence and other members of the Country Boys appeared on two episodes of The Andy Griffith Show. Between 1959 and 1962, the group released three singles on the Sundown, Republic, and Briar International record labels.

== The Kentucky Colonels ==
Following the recording sessions for the Country Boys' debut album, the band changed its name to the Kentucky Colonels in September 1962, at the suggestion of country guitarist and friend Joe Maphis. The band's album was released by Briar International under the title The New Sound of Bluegrass America in early 1963.

Around this time, Clarence's flatpicking guitar style was becoming a much more prominent part of the group's music. After attending a performance by Doc Watson at the Ash Grove folk club in Los Angeles, where he also met the guitarist, Clarence began to explore the possibilities of the acoustic guitar's role in bluegrass music. At that time, the guitar was largely regarded as a rhythm instrument in bluegrass, with only a few performers, such as Watson, exploring its potential for soloing. White soon began to integrate elements of Watson's playing style—including the use of open strings and syncopation—into his own flatpicking guitar technique. His breathtaking speed and virtuosity on the instrument was largely responsible for making the guitar a lead instrument within bluegrass.

The Kentucky Colonels became well known on the bluegrass circuit during this period and made many live appearances throughout California and the United States. Between bookings with the Colonels, White also made a guest appearance on Eric Weissberg and Marshall Brickman's New Dimensions in Banjo & Bluegrass album, which would be re-released in 1973 as the soundtrack album to the film Deliverance (with Weissberg and Steve Mandell's version of "Dueling Banjos" added to the album's track listing).

In 1964, the Colonels recruited fiddle player Bobby Sloan and continued to make live appearances at various clubs, concert halls and festivals. The Colonels' second album, Appalachian Swing!, was a commercial success and saw White's flatpicking permanently expand the language of bluegrass guitar. Music critic Thom Owens has remarked that White's playing on the album, "helped pioneer a new style in bluegrass; namely, he redefined the acoustic guitar as a solo instrument."

Shortly after the recording of the Appalachian Swing! album, Roland and Clarence undertook some session work backing dobroist Tut Taylor on a Dobro-themed album that was released by World Pacific Records in late 1964 as Dobro Country. Although the brothers were employed as session musicians, the album was credited to Tut Taylor, Roland and Clarence White upon release.

Although the Colonels were a successful recording act, it was becoming increasingly difficult for them to make a living, due to the waning popularity of the American folk music revival due to the British Invasion and homegrown folk rock acts, such as the Byrds and Bob Dylan. As a result, the Colonels switched to electric instrumentation and hired a drummer. In spite of these changes, the Kentucky Colonels dissolved as a band following a show on October 31, 1965. Clarence, Roland and Eric Jr. formed a new line-up of the Colonels in 1966, with several other musicians, but this second version of the group was short-lived and by early 1967 they had broken up.

== Session work (1966–1968) ==
During 1964, White began to look beyond bluegrass music towards rock 'n' roll as an avenue for artistic expression. Although he was influenced by Country guitarists like Doc Watson, Don Reno and Joe Maphis, he also idolized the playing of jazz guitarist Django Reinhardt, rock 'n' roller Chuck Berry, and studio musician James Burton. White even anticipated the viability of a folk/rock hybrid when, in the summer of 1964, he was approached by Jim Dickson to record a version of the then-unreleased Bob Dylan song "Mr. Tambourine Man" with electric instruments. However, despite White's enthusiasm for the project, he was unable to convince his bandmates in the Kentucky Colonels of the experiment's validity and ultimately, the song was instead recorded by Dickson's proteges, the Byrds.

By the time the original line-up of the Kentucky Colonels folded in late 1965, White had become a respected and well-known guitarist. Abandoning bluegrass temporarily, he switched from his Martin D-28 acoustic guitar to an electric Fender Telecaster, with the intention of becoming a studio musician like his hero James Burton. Transitioning to electric guitar required White to modify his right hand playing technique, switch from open chording to fretting the whole guitar neck with his left hand, and practice using the tone and volume controls. However, he soon mastered the intricacies of the instrument and, between 1965 and 1968, he undertook session work for artists including Ricky Nelson, the Monkees, and the Gosdin Brothers.

As 1965 turned into 1966, White met Gene Parsons and Gib Guilbeau at a recording session for the Gosdin Brothers and, shortly after, he began to perform live with the duo in local California clubs, as well as doing regular session work on their records, which were released under the moniker of Cajun Gib and Gene. 1966 also saw White begin playing with a country group called Trio, which featured drummer Bart Haney and former Kentucky Colonel, Roger Bush, on bass. In autumn of that year, as a result of his friendship with Gilbeau, Parsons and the Gosdin Brothers, White was asked to provide lead guitar to ex-Byrd Gene Clark's debut solo album, Gene Clark with the Gosdin Brothers. White briefly joined Clark's touring band shortly thereafter.

During the Clark album sessions, White reconnected with mandolin player and bassist Chris Hillman, who he had known during the early 1960s as a member of the bluegrass combo the Hillmen. Hillman was currently a member of the Byrds and, in December 1966, he invited White to contribute countrified lead guitar playing to his songs "Time Between" and "The Girl with No Name", which both appeared on the Byrds' Younger Than Yesterday album. The country-oriented nature of the songs was something of a stylistic departure for the group and can be seen as an early indicator of the experimentation with country music that would color the Byrds' subsequent work. White also contributed guitar to the band's follow-up album, The Notorious Byrd Brothers, and to their seminal 1968 country rock release, Sweetheart of the Rodeo.

== Nashville West ==
Nashville West (a.k.a. Hong Kong Hillbilly)
An excerpt from a 1967 live recording of Nashville West performing their self-titled signature song. Written by Clarence White and Gene Parsons, the song "Nashville West" provides an example of White's electric guitar playing technique.

By mid-1967, White had begun performing at night in the band the Reasons (a.k.a. Nashville West), which included bass player Wayne Moore, along with Parsons and Guilbeau (as banjoist-turned-drummer and lead singer respectively). The band mostly worked at the Nashville West club in El Monte, California, frequently borrowing the club's name as their own. Critic Erik Hage has said that, in the years since their formation, the band have become legendary as one of the first to play a seamless blend of country and rock, although L.A. group the International Submarine Band, which featured country rock pioneer Gram Parsons (no relation to Gene), were also exploring a similar sound concurrently.

A live recording of Nashville West would eventually be released in 1979, which music historian Richie Unterberger later described as being "of considerable historical interest for anyone interested in the roots of country-rock". Unterberger also remarked that the recording illustrated Nashville West as having "more electric rock influences than most country acts were using at the time." In addition to being a member of Nashville West, White was also a member of another country bar band that regularly played at the Nashville West club called the Roustabouts.

In July 1967, White signed with Gary Paxton's Bakersfield International record label and released a pair of solo singles: "Tango for a Sad Mood" b/w "Tuff and Stringy" and "Grandma Funderbunks Music Box" b/w "Riff Raff". He also reportedly recorded a solo album for the label, although it has never been released.

== The StringBender ==
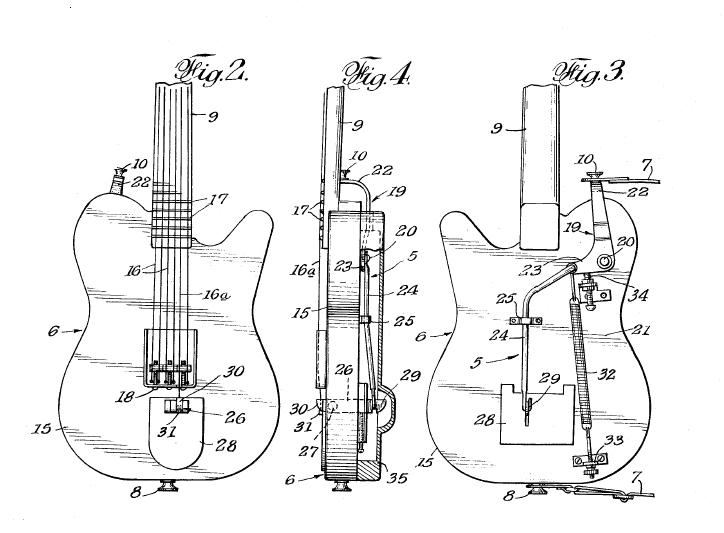
A schematic of the first Parsons/White StringBender (a.k.a. the B-Bender)

During 1967, while they were both members of Nashville West, White and Parsons invented a device that enabled Clarence to simulate the sound of a pedal steel guitar on his 1954 Fender Telecaster. The need for such a device was driven by White's desire to bend his guitar's B-string up a full tone, while keeping his left hand on the strings and fretboard. In order to achieve this feat, White felt that he needed a third hand. The guitarist turned to his friend Parsons, who was an amateur machinist, and asked him to design and build an apparatus to pull or drop the B-string.

The device, which was known as the Parsons/White StringBender (also known as the B-Bender), was a spring-lever mechanism built into the inside of White's guitar, which linked to the guitar's strap button and the B-string. When it was activated, by pulling down on the guitar neck, it pulled on the B-string and caused the guitar to simulate the "crying" sound of a pedal steel. White would go on to use the device extensively as a member of the Byrds and, as a result, the distinctive sound of the StringBender would become a defining characteristic of that band's music during White's tenure with the group.

== The Byrds ==
Tulsa County (alternate version)
An excerpt from an outtake version of the song "Tulsa County" by the Byrds. This audio clip highlights Clarence White's use of the StringBender, which was fitted to his Fender Telecaster to enable him to simulate the sound of a pedal steel guitar.

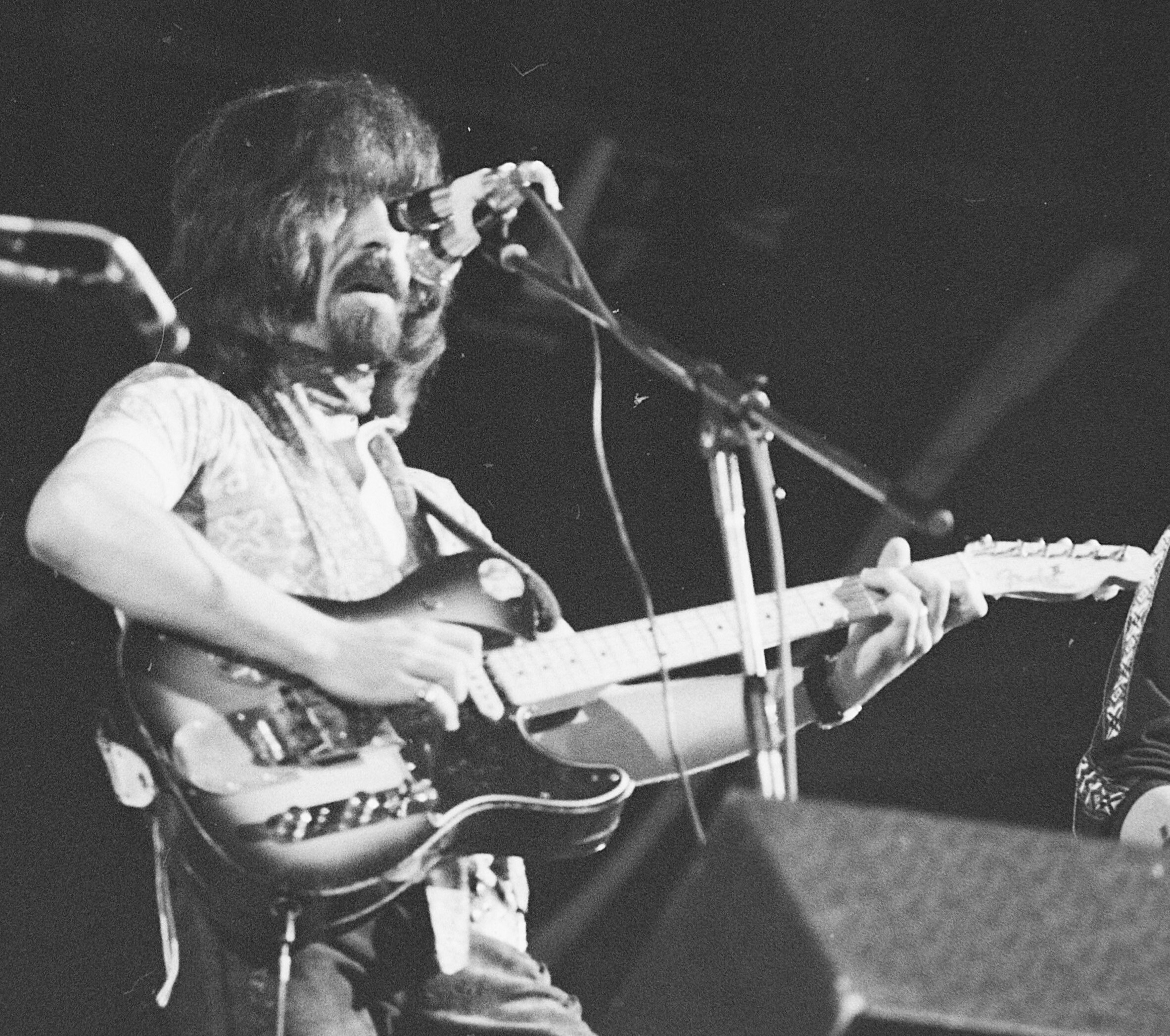
Clarence White on stage with the Byrds at the Holland Pop Festival in Kralingen, Netherlands, 27 June 1970.

Following the abrupt departure from the Byrds of singer and guitarist Gram Parsons in July 1968, White was invited to join the group as a full-time member. He remained until the band was finally dissolved by lead guitarist Roger McGuinn in February 1973. This extended tenure with the band makes White the second longest-serving member of the Byrds after McGuinn. White was brought into the group at bass player Chris Hillman's suggestion, as someone who could handle the band's older rock material and their newer country-flavored repertoire.

Once he was a member of the Byrds, White began to express dissatisfaction with the band's current drummer, Kevin Kelley. Before long, he had persuaded McGuinn and Hillman to replace Kelley with his friend from the recently dissolved Nashville West, Gene Parsons (no relation to Gram).

Hillman quit the Byrds within a month of White joining, in order to form the Flying Burrito Brothers with Gram Parsons. At around this same time, White and Gene Parsons undertook some informal rehearsing and recording with Hillman and Gram Parsons, as part of a prototype version of the Burrito Brothers. However, the pair declined an invitation to join the new country rock group and instead opted to stay with McGuinn's new-look Byrds.

"The greatest thing about Clarence was that he never played anything that sounded vaguely weak ... he was always driving—into the music—and that pulled the whole band up. He had that conservative thing he got from Bluegrass, where you underplay it on stage, where everybody poker-faces it. He would do these truly outrageous things on guitar, but hardly move a muscle, aside from his hands."

— Byrds' leader Roger McGuinn recalling White's on-stage musicianship and demeanor.

The White-era version of the Byrds, featuring McGuinn, White and Parsons, along with bassists John York (September 1968–September 1969) and Skip Battin (September 1969–February 1973), released five albums and toured relentlessly between 1969 and 1972. Journalist Steve Leggett has noted that, although the original line-up of the Byrds gets the most attention and praise, the latter-day version, featuring McGuinn and White's dual lead guitar work, was regarded by critics and audiences as much more accomplished in concert than any previous configuration of the band. Similarly, authors Scott Schinder and Andy Schwartz have commented that although the White-era Byrds failed to achieve the commercial success of the original line-up, the group were a formidable live act and a consistently in-demand attraction on the touring circuit. The authors also cited the Byrds' 2000 archival release Live at the Fillmore – February 1969 as a good example of the White-era band's musical potency. Rolling Stone journalist David Fricke has commented on White's contribution to the band by noting, "with his powerful, impeccable tone and melodic ingenuity, White did much to rebuild the creative reputation of the Byrds and define the road-hearty sound of the group at the turn of the '70s."

The first Byrds' album to feature White as a full member was Dr. Byrds & Mr. Hyde, which was released in early 1969. The album included a re-recording of the Gene Parsons and White-penned instrumental "Nashville West", as well as a rendition of the traditional song "Old Blue", which was the first Byrds' recording to utilize the StringBender. The Ballad of Easy Rider album followed in November 1969, on which White could be heard leading the band through a rendition of the traditional song "Oil in My Lamp", representing the guitarist's first lead vocal performance as a Byrd.

1970 saw the Byrds release the double album (Untitled), which consisted of one LP of live concert recordings and another of new studio recordings. Upon release, the album was a critical and commercial success on both sides of the Atlantic, peaking at number 40 on the Billboard Top LPs chart and reaching number 11 on the UK Albums Chart. Two of the album's studio recordings featured White singing lead vocals: a cover version of the Lowell George composition "Truck Stop Girl" and a rendition of Leadbelly's "Take a Whiff on Me" (the latter also featured White playing mandolin). In addition, excerpts from an instrumental jam, recorded during the (Untitled) album sessions and logged in the Columbia Records' files under the title of "Fifteen Minute Jam", were later released as "White's Lightning" and "White's Lightning Pt.2" on The Byrds box set and the remastered double CD version of (Untitled) respectively.

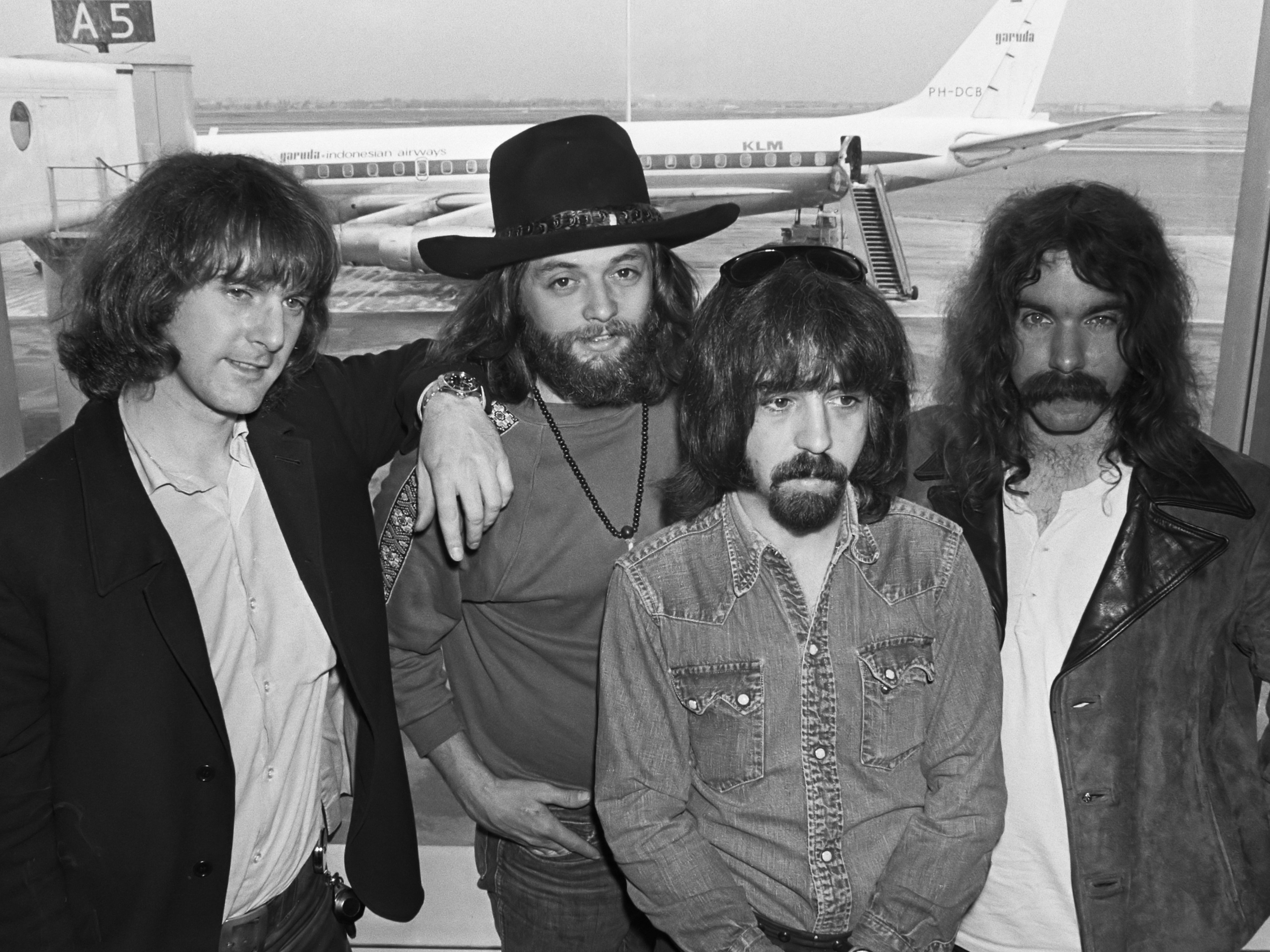
Clarence White (third from left) on tour with the Byrds in the Netherlands, June 1970.

The 1971 Byrdmaniax album saw White singing lead vocals on "My Destiny", written by Helen Carter, and "Jamaica Say You Will", penned by the then little-known songwriter Jackson Browne. In addition, White received a co-writing credit for the album's bluegrass instrumental "Green Apple Quick Step". This song also featured White's father, Eric White Sr., on harmonica.

Farther Along, released in November 1971, would prove to be the final album by the White-era Byrds. It featured White singing the Gospel hymn and title track "Farther Along" and a cover of the Larry Murray composition "Bugler". This latter song features White playing mandolin and has been described by Byrds expert Tim Connors as, "the best song on the album, and by far the best vocal ever recorded by Clarence White during his time with the Byrds."

Following the release of Farther Along, the band continued to tour throughout 1972, but no new Byrds album appeared. In late 1972, the original five-piece line-up of the Byrds reunited and, as a result, McGuinn decided to disband the existing version of the band. Parsons had been fired in July 1972 and Battin was dismissed by McGuinn in early 1973. The last concert by the White-era version of the Byrds (which at this point featured former Byrd Chris Hillman on bass and Joe Lala on drums) was given on February 24, 1973, at The Capitol Theatre, Passaic, New Jersey, with White and McGuinn jokingly firing each other from the band afterwards.

Despite being on tour or in the recording studio with the Byrds for the majority of the time between 1969 and 1972, White continued to undertake selected session work for other recording artists. During this period he played on Joe Cocker's 1969 album Joe Cocker!, Randy Newman's 1970 album 12 Songs, and the Everly Brothers' Stories We Could Tell from 1972. In early 1971, White also contributed guitar to Paul Siebel's Jack-Knife Gypsy album and the title track of the L.A. Getaway album by Joel Scott-Hill, John Barbata and Chris Ethridge. Other albums that White contributed his guitar playing to while he was a member of the Byrds include Linda Ronstadt's Hand Sown ... Home Grown (1969), Rita Coolidge's Rita Coolidge (1971), Marc Benno's Minnows (1971), Jackson Browne's Jackson Browne (1972), Gene Clark's Roadmaster (1973), and a trio of Arlo Guthrie albums: Running Down the Road (1969), Washington County (1970) and Hobo's Lullaby (1972).

== Post-Byrds ==
"Clarence was at my birthday party the night before, and he and I had agreed to start working together again—not necessarily as the Byrds, but in some form. He was incredibly talented, and full of life and full of music. I know he'd still be doing something great today if he was still around."

— Roger McGuinn recalling a meeting with White on the day before he died.

In mid-February 1973, just prior to the break up of the White-era version of the Byrds, White joined with guitarist Peter Rowan, mandolinist David Grisman, fiddler Richard Greene, and banjoist Bill Keith to form the bluegrass supergroup Muleskinner. The musicians initially assembled as a one-off pickup band to back bluegrass pioneer Bill Monroe for a television program, but ended up performing on their own when Monroe's tour bus broke down on the way to the television studios. A recording of this broadcast, which was once thought lost, was released as an album in 1992, under the title Muleskinner Live. A VHS video cassette of the broadcast was also released in 1992 and later re-issued on DVD.

As a result of the success of their appearance on the television broadcast, the band was offered a one album recording contract with Warner Bros. Records. Sessions for the album took place at the Record Plant in Los Angeles between March 27 and April 14, 1973, with Richard Greene and Joe Boyd producing. The music the band recorded for the Muleskinner album (a.k.a. A Potpourri of Bluegrass Jam) was in the vein of country rock, traditional bluegrass and progressive bluegrass (or "newgrass"). It was also one of the first bluegrass albums to feature a full drum kit. The album was released in the latter half of 1973 and is nowadays regarded by critics as a milestone in the development of progressive bluegrass, with ex-band members Greene, Keith, Grisman, and Rowan all going on to become important figures in the development of that genre.

In addition to his work with Muleskinner, White also undertook a number of sessions between late 1972 and early 1973 for his friend Gene Parsons' debut solo album Kindling. White's distinctive guitar and mandolin playing can be heard on the tracks "Do Not Disturb", "On the Spot", "Sonic Bummer", "I Must Be a Tree", "Banjo Dog", "Back Again", and "Drunkard's Dream" (the latter of which also features White contributing harmony vocals).

Following completion of the Muleskinner album in April 1973, White reunited with his brothers Roland and Eric Jr. for a tour as the White Brothers (a.k.a. The New Kentucky Colonels). After playing a handful of shows in California, the White Brothers departed for Europe in May 1973.

Returning to the U.S., White's final bout of touring took place with the New Kentucky Colonels in June 1973, as part of a four-date country rock package tour with Gram Parsons, Emmylou Harris, Country Gazette, Sneaky Pete Kleinow, Gene Parsons, Byron Berline, and Chris Ethridge among others. Although Gram and Clarence had been acquainted with one another since the Byrds' Sweetheart of the Rodeo sessions, the pair would develop a fast friendship during the mini-tour, after a very acrimonious re-acquaintance. Following the end of the package tour, White entered the recording studio with producer Jim Dickson on June 28 and 29, 1973 to begin work on a solo album. He recorded a total of six songs, four of which would belatedly be released on the archival album Silver Meteor: A Progressive Country Anthology in 1980.

== Death ==
White died on July 15, 1973 in Palmdale, California after being struck by a drunk driver. The accident occurred shortly after 2 a.m. while White and his brother Roland were loading equipment into their car following a White Brothers concert. Clarence was survived by his wife Susie, daughter Michelle, and son Bradley. Clarence was 29 years old. His wife Susie, and 11 year old son Bradley, were killed in an automobile accident in 1981.

Gram Parsons was especially shaken by White's death; he led a singalong of "Farther Along" at White's funeral service and later conceived his final song (before his own death), "In My Hour of Darkness", as a partial tribute to White.

== Musical influence ==
Clarence White helped popularize the acoustic guitar as a lead instrument in bluegrass music, building on the work of guitarists such as Doc Watson. Prior to the advent of the more aggressive flatpicking style pioneered by guitarists like Watson and White, the guitar was strictly a rhythm instrument, save for a few exceptions (such as the occasional guitar track by banjoist Don Reno). Many of the most influential flatpickers of the 20th century cite White as a primary influence, including Dan Crary, Norman Blake, and Tony Rice. Rice owned and played White's highly modified 1935 Martin D-28. David Grier and Russ Barenberg are two other acoustic guitarists who were heavily influenced by White's guitar work. White's bluegrass playing with the Kentucky Colonels was also a considerable influence on Jerry Garcia of the Grateful Dead, who traveled with the band during 1964.

On the electric side of the guitar spectrum, White was similarly influential. Together with fellow Byrds bandmember Gene Parsons, White invented the B-Bender device. This device raises the B-string (second string) of the guitar a whole step by the use of pulleys and levers attached to both the upper strap knob and the second string on the guitar. It is activated by pushing down on the neck, and produces a "pedal steel" type sound. Arlen Roth, heavily influenced by this style, did not at the time know that White and Parsons had invented a B-bender, so instead developed his own unique all-finger bending version of this technique. This was heavily documented in his ground-breaking book, "Nashville Guitar", all of his recordings, as well as his book "Masters of the Telecaster". Subsequently, his Telecaster sound became as notable as his bluegrass playing. Marty Stuart, another guitarist influenced by White's playing, now owns and regularly plays White's 1954 Fender Telecaster with the prototype B-Bender.

Music archivist and writer Alec Palao has called White "one of a handful of true greats amongst the instrumentalists of 20th century popular music", before adding that "the waves created by the guitarist's idiosyncratic style are still forming ripples within bluegrass, country and rock 'n' roll." In 2003, White was ranked No. 41 on Rolling Stone magazine's list of the 100 Greatest Guitarists of All Time. In 2010, guitar manufacturer Gibson ranked White at No. 42 on their Top 50 Guitarists of All Time list.

== Selected album discography ==
NOTES:

- This discography does not include albums that Clarence White played on as a session musician, with the exception of Dobro Country, on which he is billed by name.
- Sources for this section are Johnny Rogan's book Timeless Flight Revisited and the Kentucky Colonels discography at the AllMusic website.

=== Kentucky Colonels ===
- The New Sound of Bluegrass America (1963)
- Appalachian Swing! (1964)
- Kentucky Colonels (1974) — UK reissue of Appalachian Swing! with two bonus tracks.
- Livin' in the Past (1975) — Various live recordings from 1961 to 1965.
- The Kentucky Colonels 1965-1966 (1976) — Live recordings.
- Scotty Stoneman, Live in LA with the Kentucky Colonels (1979) — Live recording from 1965.
- Kentucky Colonels 1966 (1979) — Studio demo recordings for an unreleased album.
- Clarence White and the Kentucky Colonels (1980) — Live recordings.
- On Stage (1984) — Live recordings.
- Long Journey Home (1991) — Live recordings from the 1964 Newport Folk Festival.
- Live in Stereo (1999) — Live recordings from a 1965 concert in Vancouver.
- Bush, Latham & White (2011) — Live recordings from 1964.

=== Tut Taylor, Roland and Clarence White ===
- Dobro Country (1964)

=== Nashville West ===
- Nashville West (a.k.a. The Legendary Nashville West Album) (1979) — Live recordings from 1967.

=== The Byrds ===
- Dr. Byrds & Mr. Hyde (1969)
- Ballad of Easy Rider (1969)
- (Untitled) (1970)
- Byrdmaniax (1971)
- Farther Along (1971)
- Live at the Fillmore – February 1969 (2000)
- Live at Royal Albert Hall 1971 (2008)
- The Lost Broadcasts (2011) — Live recordings from the Byrds' 1971 appearance on the Beat-Club television program.

=== Muleskinner ===
- Muleskinner (aka A Pot Pourri of Bluegrass Jam) (1973)
- Muleskinner Live: Original Television Soundtrack (1992) — Live recordings from a 1973 television broadcast.

=== The New Kentucky Colonels ===
- The White Brothers: The New Kentucky Colonels Live in Sweden 1973 (1976)
- Live in Holland 1973 (2013)

=== Clarence White ===
- 33 Acoustic Guitar Instrumentals (2003) — Recorded in 1962.
- Tuff & Stringy Sessions 1966–68 (2003) — Various studio sessions.
- Flatpick (2006) — Recorded 1964, 1967, 1970 and 1973.
- White Lightnin' (2008) — Various recordings from 1962 to 1972.

=== Tut Taylor & Clarence White ===
- Tut & Clarence Flatpickin' (2003)
