= Joe Carr (Texas musician) =

Joseph Allen Carr (June 22, 1951 – December 14, 2014) was an American country and roots musician, author, and professor originally from Denton, Texas. Self-taught, he began playing first folk music and later old-time and bluegrass music on guitar at age 13 and mandolin at age 15. After performing with local Texas bands Roanoke in the 1970s and Country Gazette in the 1970s and 80s, Carr formed a "Bob Wills style" Western swing band, Joe Carr & the Texas Lone Star Band, in 1987. Beginning in 1984, he taught at the commercial music program at South Plains College in Levelland, Texas, For the last several years of his life, he was in charge of the bluegrass and Western swing departments at the college and was the director of Camp Bluegrass held there annually

Carr penned numerous instructional books and videos for mandolin, western swing guitar, flat-picking guitar, banjo, and ukulele as well as coauthor (with former South Plains colleague Alan Munde) of the 1996 Prairie Nights to Neon Lights: The Story of Country Music in West Texas. He also cowrote and performed a two-man musical comedy play called Two Swell Guys from Texas with Munde. He was also a frequent contributor to Flatpicking Guitar Magazine and Mandolin Magazine.

Carr died from a stroke on December 14, 2014, in Levelland, Texas. He was 63.

== Works ==
=== Bibliography ===
- Joe Carr and Alan Munde. Prairie Nights to Neon Lights: The Story of Country Music in West Texas. (1996)

=== Discography ===
- Joe Carr. Otter Nonsense. (Ridge Runner, 1980)
- Joe Carr & the Texas Lone Star Band. Let's Go Dancing Down in Texas. (Compose/Peter Pan, 1992)
- Joe Carr & the Texas Lone Star Band. Dance Country. (Compose/Peter Pan, 1995)
- Alan Munde & Joe Carr. Welcome to West Texas. (Flying Fish, 1998)
