= Byron Berline =

American fiddle player (1944–2021)

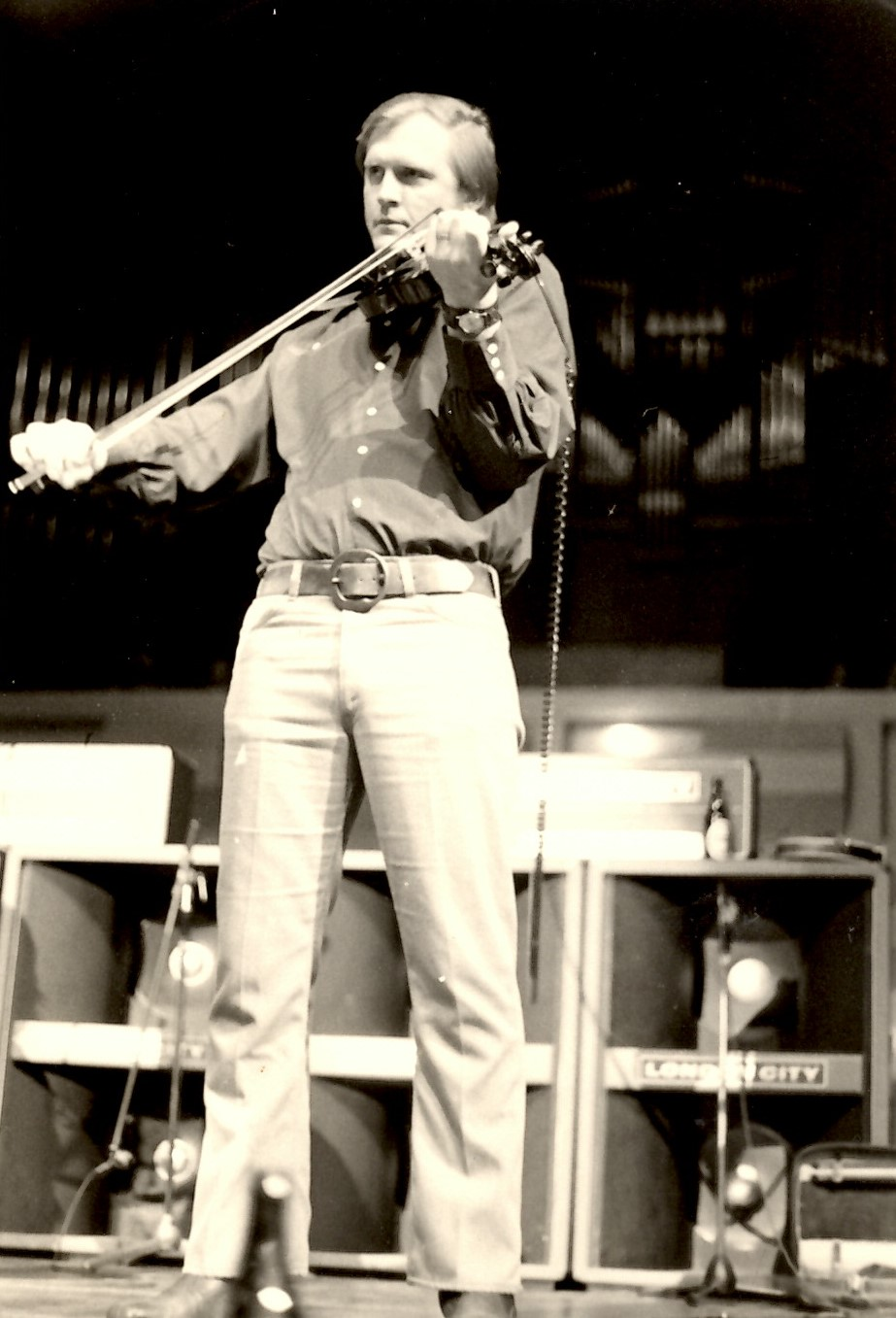
- Berline in 1970

Background information
- Born: Byron Douglas Berline; July 6, 1944; Caldwell, Kansas, US
- Died: July 10, 2021 (aged 77) Oklahoma City, Oklahoma, U.S.
- Genres: Bluegrass; rock; country rock
- Occupation: Musician
- Instruments: Fiddle; mandolin
- Years active: 1960s–2021

Byron Douglas Berline (July 6, 1944 – July 10, 2021) was an American fiddle player who played many American music styles, including old time, ragtime, bluegrass, Cajun, country, and rock. Berline was posthumously inducted into the International Bluegrass Music Hall of Fame in 2026.

== Life and career ==
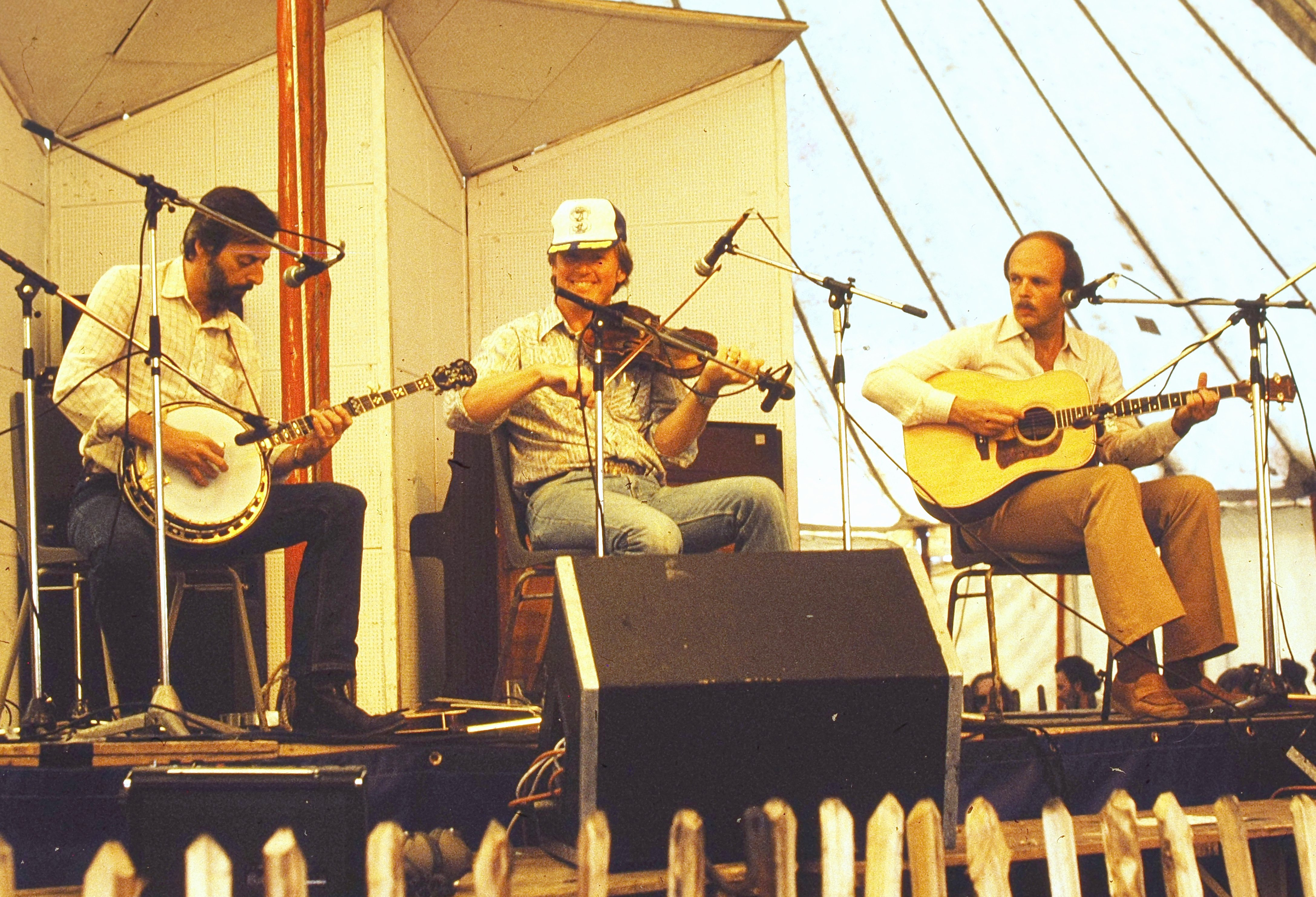
Berline, Crary and Hickman at Cambridge Folk Festival, UK, 1981. L-R: John Hickman, banjo; Byron Berline, fiddle; Dan Crary, guitar.

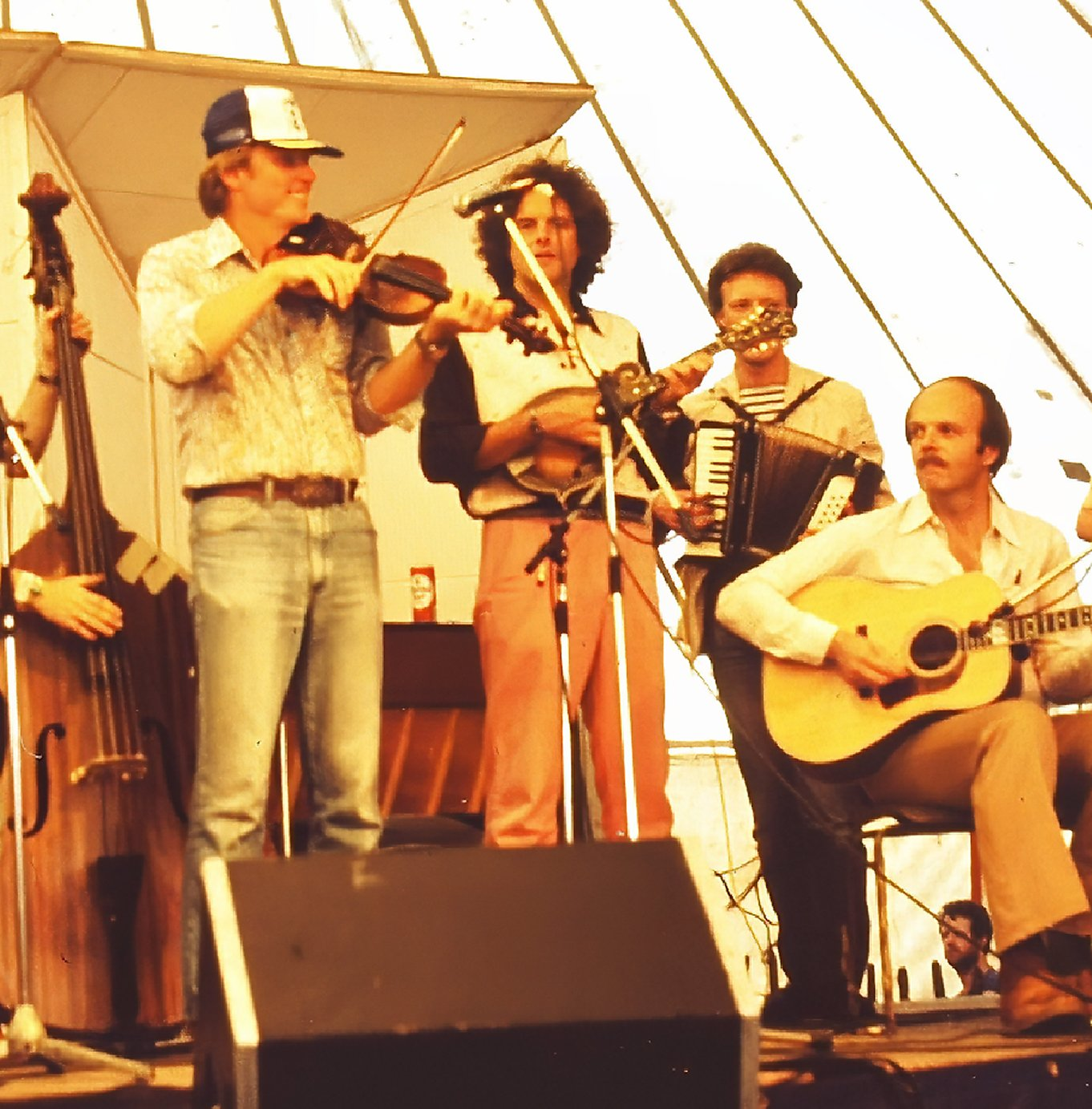
Byron Berline, Peter Rowan (center), Dan Crary with others at Cambridge Folk Festival, UK, 1981

Berline was born in Caldwell, Kansas, on July 6, 1944. He started playing the fiddle at age five and quickly developed his talent. In 1965 he recorded the album Pickin' and Fiddlin' with the Dillards. That year he met Bill Monroe at the Newport Folk Festival and was offered a job with Monroe's Bluegrass Boys, but he turned it down to finish his education. He graduated from the University of Oklahoma in 1967 with a teaching degree in Physical Education and joined the Bluegrass Boys in March, replacing Richard Greene. He recorded three instrumentals with them, including "Gold Rush", which Berline and Monroe co-wrote, and which has become a jam session standard. Berline left the group in September 1967 when he was drafted into the Army.

Discharged from the Army in 1969, Berline joined Dillard & Clark on the album Through the Morning, Through the Night. He moved to Southern California that year.

He played on "Country Honk" on the Rolling Stones' album Let It Bleed—the song the Stones later recorded as "Honky Tonk Women". (Source: album sleeve notes, Keith Richard's autobiography) Mick Jagger asked him to record the fiddle part out on the street to give it a better ambiance. A car horn that was picked up in this recording was left on the track, as Jagger thought it reflected the spirit of the song. At the time, Berline had just left the US army, and recording with the Stones catapulted his career exponentially.

He won the National Oldtime Fiddlers' Contest Championship in Weiser, Idaho, in 1965, and won it again in 1967 and 1970.

He joined The Flying Burrito Brothers in 1971, recording two albums, Last of the Red Hot Burritos (Live) and Six Days On the Road: Live in Amsterdam. After the Burritos' breakup, Berline briefly worked with Stephen Stills's band Manassas (which also included several other Burritos' alumni) contributing to several songs on their debut album. Together with Alan Munde, Kenny Wertz, and Roger Bush, Berline formed the band Country Gazette early in 1972.

Berline joined guitarist Dan Crary, banjoist John Hickman and others to form Byron Berline and Sundance. Their self-titled debut album was released on MCA Records in 1976. A young Vince Gill later joined the band on mandolin. The album Live at McCabes was released in 1978.

In 1979 Berline had a small role as a country musician in the film The Rose. In 1987, he appeared briefly playing violin in the first-season episode "Where No One Has Gone Before" of Star Trek: The Next Generation.

In 1981 he again collaborated with Crary and Hickman, forming the band Berline, Crary, and Hickman (BCH). A subsequent line up also included Steve Spurgin and John Moore. That band later became known as California. California was named the International Bluegrass Music Association Instrumental Group of the Year in 1992, 1993, and 1994.

In April 1995, Berline moved to Guthrie, Oklahoma, to open a fiddle shop called "Double Stop". From the jam sessions there on the upper floor "The Byron Berline Band" was formed. This shop became one of the best known music stores in the country, where fiddlers from all around the world would stop to buy their instruments and congregate for a jam session. It burnt down in 2019, but the local community helped finance a new venue for it across the street.

In 1996, Berline, along with Oklahoma State Representative Joe Hutchinson founded the annual Oklahoma International Bluegrass Festival, to which he has invited many bluegrass icons, including Earl Scruggs, Ricky Skaggs and John Hartford. Famous international bluegrass bands have also performed there, such as Druhá Tráva (Czech Republic), the Kruger Brothers (Switzerland) and The Japanese Bluegrass Band.

Berline has recorded several solo albums, most notably Fiddle and a Song, with guest performances from Earl Scruggs, Bill Monroe, Vince Gill and Mason Williams. In 1995 it was nominated for a Grammy Award for Best Bluegrass Album. Its song "Sally Goodin" was nominated for Best Country & Western Instrumental Performance.

The last line up of the Byron Berline Band included Thomas Trapp, Richard Sharp, Greg Burgess and Bill Perry. They regularly played around the US and in Europe, and would also perform two concerts a month for the townsfolk of Guthrie.

On February 23, 2019, the Double Stop Fiddle Shop burned to the ground while Berline was in Mexico. It destroyed dozens of irreplaceable instruments, but one of Byron's favorite mandolins was protected in a safe. He opened a new venue, the Double Stop Fiddle Shop and Music Hall, across the street.

Berline died at the age of 77 on July 10, 2021, in Oklahoma City of complications of a stroke.

Berline recorded with many well known musicians including The Rolling Stones, Bob Dylan, The Band, Elton John, The Byrds, Janis Ian, Earl Scruggs, Dillard & Clark, Willie Nelson, Guthrie Thomas, Bill Monroe, The Flying Burrito Brothers, Doc Watson, John Denver, Gene Clark, Rod Stewart, The Eagles, The Band, Vince Gill, Gram Parsons, Emmylou Harris, Tammy Wynette, Alabama, Don Francisco, Mary Chapin Carpenter, The Dillards, Mason Williams, Stephen Stills, Bill Wyman, Manhattan Transfer, Joe Diffie, The Doobie Brothers, Lucinda Williams, François Vola, Mickey Gilley, Deke Leonard, and Andy Statman.

His music has also appeared in television and film soundtracks, including Star Trek, Blue Collar, Hardcore, Basic Instinct, Blaze, Back to the Future Part III, Northern Exposure, Stay Hungry, and Run, Simon, Run.

== Discography ==
- Pickin' and Fiddlin' (with The Dillards) (1965)
- Byron Berline & Sundance (1976)
- Dad's Favorites (1977)
- Live at McCabes (1978)
- Byron Berline and the L.A. Fiddle Band (1980)
- Outrageous (1980)
- Berline, Crary, Hickman (1981)
- Francois Vola (1983)
- Night Run (1984)
- B-C-H (1986)
- Double Trouble (1986)
- Now They Are Four (1989)
- Jumpin' the Strings (1990)
- Fiddle and a Song (1995)
- Flatbroke Fiddler (2005)
- Flying Fingers (2016)
