= Ko Ko Mo (I Love You So) =

1955 single by Gene and Eunice

Song by Gene and Eunice (original)
- Published: 1954
- Genre: Novelty song, rock
- Label: Combo, Aladdin Records
- Composers: Forest Gene Wilson, Eunice Levy

"Ko Ko Mo (I Love You So)" is a popular rock novelty song written in late 1954 by the rhythm and blues partnership of Forest Gene Wilson and Eunice Levy, and also credited to Jake Porter. One of the earliest rock and roll songs, it was probably "the most extensively recorded rock 'n' roll song of that time".

Originally recorded by rhythm and blues duo Gene and Eunice (Wilson and Levy) in November 1954 on the Combo label and again in January 1955 on the Aladdin label, it was covered by at least 17 different musicians in the first few months of 1955 alone, including Perry Como, The Crew-Cuts, The Charms, Louis Armstrong and Gary Crosby, Goldie Hill & Red Sovine, Hawkshaw Hawkins and Rita Robbins, The Hutton Sisters (Marion Hutton and Betty Hutton), The Flamingos, Ronnie Aldrich and The Squads, Tito Rodríguez, Big Dave and His Orchestra, Marvin & Johnny, Barry Frank (with the Four Bells), Bill Darnell & Betty Clooney, Jack Cardwell with Jackie Hill, and The Dooley Sisters. Andy Griffith also recorded a satirical parody of the song.

The song spent 15 weeks in the Billboard charts from January to May 1955, and peaked at #3 in its Honor Roll of Hits in the week ending March 2, 1955. The version by Perry Como, RCA's first rock 'n' roll release, was the most successful, reaching #2 on the Billboard charts in February 1955, while a version by The Crew-Cuts reached #6 on the Pop charts that same month. Gene and Eunice's two versions were on the charts for 7 weeks and reached #6 on the Billboard R&B charts.

== History ==
Forrest Samuel Wilson Jr. (born September 3, 1931, in San Antonio, Texas; died on July 24, 2003, in Las Vegas, Nevada) (known professionally as Gene Forrest) and Eunice Hazel Russ (known professionally as Eunice Levy) (born March 12, 1931, in Texarkana, Texas; died May 26, 2002), who were romantically involved with one another (and later married) and known as "The Sweethearts of Rhythm & Blues", wrote the song together by the Spring of 1954. Classified as a rhythm and blues song, it featured Dave Bartholomew's much-used (or even over-used) tresillo three-beat Caribbean or Latin riff, and a habanera bassline.

=== Gene and Eunice ===
Performing under the name Gene and Eunice, in the Fall of 1954 Forrest and Levy made the first recording of the song, backed by Jonesy's Combo (which included saxophonist Brother William Woodman's band), in the studio in the basement of veteran musician Jake Porter's home, and released in November 1954 on his Combo label (Combo 64) as their first single. Late in 1954 The Billboard magazine reported: "Uptowners also digging the stellar treatment issued by newcomers Gene and Eunice and their Combo 'Ko-Ko-Mo' slicing".

On the 78 rpm version (Combo 64-A), the songwriting was credited to G. Forest and Porter (as V. Haver), with no credit given to Levy; however, the 45 rpm version (Combo 45 64-A) credited Forrest (as F. Wilson), Porter, and Levy as the songwriters. The song was copyrighted to Wilson, Porter, and Levy and the Meridian Music Corporation on January 10, 1955, and reviewed positively in The Billboard magazine on January 15, 1955. Played by influential pioneer rock and roll disc jockey Alan Freed on his program on 1010 WINS from New York City, this version of the song "hit it big in New York and Chicago very quickly", as well as in Cincinnati, Cleveland, Atlanta, and Los Angeles by mid-January 1955.

However, in January 1955, Aladdin Records, which had Wilson on contract as a solo artist, claimed ownership of the team of Gene & Eunice, and had them record another version of the song with Johnny Otis's band (billed as Johnny's Combo—perhaps as a slap at Combo Records) (Aladdin 3276). While the songwriting was credited to Wilson, Porter and Levy, Aladdin also claimed the publishing rights, which Porter had only a few weeks earlier sold to the E.H. Morris Publishing Company for an advance of $5,000, with the result that Forrest and Levy received very little of the songwriting royalties due them. Aladdin released the re-cut version on January 17, 1955. Aladdin, a much larger independent label than Combo, ran an ad in Billboard announcing: "Don't Be Fooled! This Is The Gene & Eunice Ko Ko Mo." Combo Records responded on January 22, 1955, proclaiming: "This is it! The original Ko Ko Mo".

The Combo and Aladdin singles, counted as one unit by Billboard's compilers, entered the Billboard R&B charts in the week ending January 26, 1955, and spent 7 weeks in the charts, before it reached #7 in the week ending February 16, 1955, before peaking at #6 on the R&B charts.

== Cover versions ==
Encouraged by findings of the US Federal Court in the A Little Bird Told Me case that permitted cover versions, and fueled by advance rumors that the song was a likely hit, by the middle of January 1955, cover versions had been recorded by Perry Como (RCA Victor 20-5994A) on January 4, 1955, in New York city; The Crew-Cuts; The Hutton Sisters (Marion Hutton and Betty Hutton) (Capitol 303); the Bill Darnel & Betty Clooney duo (X Records "X"-0087; 4X-0087); and The Dooley Sisters (Tampa 100) that "broke loose in Pittsburgh".

By the end of January 1955, there were also a jazz version by Louis Armstrong and Gary Crosby (Decca 29420), that was recorded on January 18, 1955, in Los Angeles; The Charms (De Luxe 6080). a "vigorous country" version by Alabama disc jockey Jack Cardwell with Jackie Hill (King 1442), that was recorded on January 20, 1955, at radio station WKAB in Mobile, Alabama; a country version by Goldie Hill & Red Sovine (Decca 29411); and a rockabilly/Western swing version by country singer Hawkshaw Hawkins with Rita Robbins (Victor 47-6022);

However, pioneer rock and roll disc jockey Alan Freed refused to play the copycat 'cover' versions of R&B hits (including "Ko Ko Mo") which were rapidly being turned out by the major pop labels, as he believed that they were imitative of the originals and that his audience quickly detected their lack of authenticity. Other disc jockeys refused to play any R&B songs, including Marc Jennings, of WCMI in Huntington, West Virginia, who indicated in May 1955:

"Tunes like 'Kiss the Baby', 'Hearts of Stone', 'Ko Ko Mo' and 'Tweedle Dee' are products of the mass hysteria prevalent in our world today."

=== Perry Como ===
"Ko Ko Mo (I Love You So)"

Single by Perry Como
- B-side: "You'll Always Be My Lifetime Sweetheart"
- Released: January 1955
- Recorded: January 4, 1955
- Studio: Webster Hall, New York City
- Genre: Big band, Traditional pop
- Length: 2:40
- Label: RCA Victor
- Songwriters: Forest Gene Wilson, Jake Porter, Eunice Levy

Perry Como singles chronology
| "There's No Place Like (Home for the Holidays)" (1954) | "Ko Ko Mo (I Love You So)" (1955) | "Chee Chee-Oo Chee (Sang the Little Bird)" (1955) |

The most popular and commercially successful version of Ko Ko Mo (I Love You So) was that of Perry Como, "the quintessential white pop crooner of the 1950s", who recorded his version at Webster Hall, New York on January 4, 1955, as the first rock 'n' roll release on the RCA Victor label. Shapiro and Pollock viewed Como's version as part of "the industry effort to whitewash the racy, raunchy music of rhythm and blues before anyone's daughter heard it".

Como's version was reviewed positively in The Billboard magazine in its January 15, 1955, issue, and the label promoted it extensively in a two-page advertising spread in the same issue, headlined as "DIG PERRY IN ACTION ON A GREAT 'ROCK-AND-ROLL' RECORD". Como also performed the song on his television program "The Perry Como Chesterfield Show" in mid-January, and again on February 18, 1955.

Entering the Billboard charts on February 5, 1955, eventually the song spent 14 weeks in the charts. Como's version peaked on March 2, 1955, when it was ranked #2 onBillboard's Disc Jockey Chart, #5 on the Best Sellers in Stores chart, and #5 on the Juke Box Chart. However, on March 2, 1955, Julius La Rosa sang the song with Joni James on Como's Perry Como Chesterfield Show on CBS due to Como's vacation. Como also performed the song on his NBC television program The Perry Como Show on October 29, 1955. At the end of 1955, Como's version was ranked by Billboard Magazine as #22 on its Disc Jockey charts and #25 of the year's Top Tunes based on record sales.

Como again performed the song on The Perry Como Show on April 28, 1956, this time with Louis Armstrong, who had previously covered the song with Gary Crosby in early 1955.

Despite its commercial success, Como's version is regarded by some critics as being one of his worst recordings, due to his reluctance to record the song, his apparent discomfort, an inane choral backing, and losing both the rhythm and meter of the song in the final chorus. Albin Zak described Como's version as a "bizarre transformation emphasizing the novelty element to the point of Spike Jonesish parody."

=== The Crew-Cuts ===
"Ko Ko Mo (I Love You So)"

Single by The Crew-Cuts
- B-side: "Earth Angel"
- Released: 1955
- Recorded: 1955
- Genre: Big band, Traditional pop, R&B, Doo-wop, Swing music
- Length: 2:40
- Label: Mercury records
- Songwriters: Forest Gene Wilson, Jake Porter, Eunice Levy

The Crew-Cuts singles chronology
| "Don't Be Angry" (1955) | "Ko Ko Mo (I Love You So)" (1955) | "Chop Chop Boom" (1955) |

Canadian vocal quartet The Crew-Cuts' version of Ko Ko Mo was released by Mercury Records as catalog number 70529. After their version was reviewed positively in The Billboard magazine on January 15, 1955, it entered the Billboard magazine charts on January 29, 1955, eventually spending 14 weeks in the there. On the Disk Jockey chart, it peaked at #11; on the Best Seller chart, at #10; on the Juke Box chart, at #6. The song was one side of a two-sided hit, with the flip side being "Earth Angel."

Defending against the criticism that they and other white artists were being "predatory" by "systematically pillaging the R&B charts" and recording cover versions of songs written by black musicians, Crew-Cut member Rudi Maugeri responded:

"If we hadn't done "Don't Be Angry" or "Ko Ko Mo (I Love You So)" or "Earth Angel", these songs would not have helped black groups get their songs to the white masses. They helped us by writing good Material, and we helped them by doing their material and presenting it to white audiences."

=== The Flamingos ===
In an attempt to capitalize on what he felt would be a hit record after hearing Gene and Eunice's Combo Records version in California in November 1954, Chicago blues label Parrot Records owner Al Benson encouraged The Flamingos to record an up tempo version of the song on his label (Parrot 812). Released in late January 1955, the single features Nate Nelson and Johnny Carterin unison on lead. While it was played on the radio in various parts of the United States, it was never able to steal the thunder from the Gene and Eunice version. This lack of commercial success precipitated their move to Chess Records' Checkers subsidiary later in 1955.

In January 1959 Checker Records re-released The Flamingo's Parrot Records version as a single, and included it on their self-titled album the following month. In 1961 The Flamingos re-released a version of the song on End Records (End 1085).

=== The Charms ===
On January 11, 1955, The Charms recorded their version of the song on the De Luxe label (De Luxe 6080). Seen as a cover of The Flamingo's cover, their "attempt to hijack Gene And Eunice's 'Ko Ko Mo' in February 1955 failed, and saw the group return to writing originals." Alan Freed's refusal to play cover records at the time (really directed at White pop covers); nonetheless had the effect of shutting out The Charms. Despite reaching #7 in the New Orleans R&B charts by mid-February, their version was withdrawn from sale by the end of February 1955.

=== Other versions ===
By the end of February 1955, there was also a mambo version of Ko Ko Mo (I Love You So) by Tito Rodríguez(Victor 47-5998); Additionally, Andy Griffith (Capitol 3057) had satirized the song in which he described the love affair of a lady wrestler and a referee. Griffith's version was still in the top 10 of the Capitol Records on the Pop charts on April 30, 1955.

By March 19, 1955, at least another two versions were released: including those by Marvin & Johnny (Modern 949); and Barry Frank (with the Four Bells) (Bell Records).

On April 18, 1955, Life magazine, in discussing the emergence of rock 'n roll music and the ensuing controversy, mentioned Ko Ko Mo in the article as representative of the new songs that were dominating the juke boxes. On April 24, 1955 Mitch Miller defended "Ko Ko Mo (I Love You So)" in an article in The New York Times entitled "June, Moon and Swoon and Ko Ko Mo".

In 1955 rockabilly duo The Collins Kids performed the song on Tex Ritter's Town Hall Ranch Party television program. Jamaican / British vocal groupThe Southlanders performed the song on BBC television program In Town Tonight on October 15, 1955.

In 1957 professional baseball player Arthur Lee Maye & Mel Williams recorded the song on Johnny Otis' Dig Records, however it was not released until 2000, when it was included on Johnny Otis Rock 'N Roll Hit Parade (ACE CDCHD 774). In August 1959 Joe Houston released "a rocking arrangement" of the song that featured horns (Combo 157), and a "deliriously fractured doo-wop harmony over a loping rhumba pattern".

In 1960 Sam Butera & The Witnesses released their version of the song on Dot Records. By September 1961 The Four Amigos (Jose Vadis, Miguel Alcaildes, German Salinas, and Pedro Berrios), "a lively Puerto Rican cross between The Four Preps and Kingston Trio", released a Spanish-language version of the song on Capitol Records [Capitol ST 1617].

In January 1965 The Righteous Brothers included the song on their Phil Spector produced fourth album You've Lost That Lovin' Feelin' (Philles Records PHLP-4007, LP-4007), and subsequently performed the song on the NBC television program Shindig! on March 10, 1965, and again on September 18, 1965. Also in 1965 New Jersey quartet The Valtairs (Harry Ray, Joe Gardner, Kenneth Short, and Gregory Henson) released the song as the flip side of "Moonlight in Vermont" on the Selsom Records label, but it failed to chart.

== Discography ==
=== Singles ===
- Gene and Eunice (with Jonesy's Combo) (November, 1954; Combo 64).
- Gene and Eunice (with Johnny's Combo) (January 17, 1955; Aladdin 3276).
- Perry Como (with Mitchell Ayres and his Orchestra and the Ray Charles Singers) (US: January 1955; RCA Victor 47-5994; 20-5994A) (UK: 1955; His Master's Voice B-10841)
- The Crew-Cuts (with the David Carroll Orchestra) (US: January 1955; Mercury Records 70529-X45; 70529 78) (Canada: Mercury 70529-X45) (UK: 1955: Mercury MB. 3202) (Germany: 1955; Austroton M 70529).
- The Flamingos (January 1955; Parrot 812).
- Jack Cardwell with Jackie Hill (January, 1955; King 45-1442).
- Bill Darnell & Betty Clooney (with Sid Bass and Orchestra) (January 1955; "X" Records 4X-0087).
- The Dooley Sisters directed by Robert Scherman (January 1955; Tampa TP 100-45) (UK: March 1955; London Records HL 8128).
- Goldie Hill & Red Sovine (January 1955; Decca 9-29411).
- Hawkshaw Hawkins and Rita Robbins with String Band (January 1955; RCA Victor 47-6022).
- The Charms (US: February 1955: De Luxe6080). (UK: March 1955; Parlophone MSP 6155; Parlophone R 3988 GOLD 78 rpm).
- The Hutton Sisters (Marion Hutton and Betty Hutton) Orchestra conducted by Vic Schoen (US: January 1955; Capitol F 3031) (UK: April 1955; Capitol 14250).
- Louis Armstrong & Gary Crosby (with The Jud Conlon Rhythmaires) (US: February 1955; Decca 9-29420) (UK: March 1955; Brunswick 05400) (Germany: 1955; Brunswick 82 849A; Brunswick 12044) (Germany: Satchmo Sings August 1955; Brunswick 10 030)
- Andy Griffith (adaption by Griffith and Ainslie Pryor) (with Orchestra conducted by Burt Massengail) (US: 1955; Capitol F3057) (UK: April 1955; Capitol CL 14263).
- Ronnie Aldrich and The Squads (featuring Andy Reavley) (UK: March 1955; Decca F 10494).
- Four-In-a-Chord (UK: May 1955; Embassy Records WB130).
- Tito Rodríguez (1955: Victor 47-5998).
- The Four Jacks with Herbie Layne's Orchestra (1955; Gateway Top Tune Records 1106).
- The Four Jacks with Herbie Layne's Orchestra (1955; Big 4 Hits 125).
- Marvin & Johnny (1955; Modern 949).
- Gayle Lark with The Rhythmaires (with Nat Charles and Orchestra) (1955; Tops Records R252X45-49) (Record-of-the-Month Club Records 45-R252).
- The Rockets (with The Prom Orchestra) (Prom Records 45-1104-A).
- Barry Frank (with the Four Bells) and the Jimmy Carroll Orchestra (1955; Bell Records 1089).
- The Rock 'N Rollers (directed by Ken Jones) (UK: May 1958; Embassy Records WEP1004).
- The Southlanders (UK: 1958; Decca Records).
- The Flamingos (January 1959; Checker).
- Joe Houston (August 1959; Combo 157).
- Sam Butera & The Witnesses (1960: Dot Records 45-16072).
- The Flamingos (1961; End 1085)
- The Four Amigos (Capitol ST 1617). Spanish-language version.
- The Valtairs (1965: Selsom Records s 1061).
- Gene and Eunice (1973; United Artists Silver Spotlight Series XW151).
- Gene and Eunice (US: 1974; Imperial Records The Golden Series 015) (UK: 1974: Phoenix Records PR 4435).
- The Flamingos (1979; Lost Nite Records 154).
- Ray Ellington Quartet (UK: Columbia Records).
- Sid Phillips and his band (UK: His Master's Voice).

=== Albums ===
- Various Artists 8 Top Hits: Hits, Hits Hooray! (1954; Waldorf Music Hall MH 3310) Loren Becker with the Enoch Light Orchestra & Chorus.
- Andy Griffith Make Yourself Comfortable (US: 1955; Capitol EAP 1-630) (Australia: 1958; Capitol EAP 1-630).
- The Crew-Cuts (with the David Carroll Orchestra) Tops in Pops (1955; Mercury Records EP-1-4001-A)
- Big Dave and His Orchestra (Vocal by The Nuggets) Arthur Murray ... Rock 'N' Roll (1955; Capitol EAP 3-640).
- The Crew-Cuts Presenting the Crew-Cuts (UK: 1956; Mercury MEP 9002).
- Various Artists Schlagerparade USA (Germany: May 1956; Brunswick 86 036 LPB; LPB 86036) Louis Armstrong and Gary Crosby.
- Various Artists Rock ‘n Roll with Rhythm and Blues (September 1956; Aladdin Records LP-710 -).
- The Crew-Cuts Crew Cut Capers (1957; Mercury).
- Various Artists Johnny Otis Rock 'N Roll Hit Parade (1957; Dig Records unreleased) (2000; Ace CDCHD 774). Features Arthur Lee Maye and Mel Williams version.
- The Flamingos The Flamingos (February 1959; Checker LP 3005).
- Betty Hutton Betty Hutton at the Saints and Sinners Ball (1959; reissued by Sepia Records in 2009) features duet with Marion Hutton.
- Louis Armstrong & His All-Stars Happy Birthday, Louis!: Live at the Newport Jazz Festival 1960 (1960).
- Sam Butera & The Witnesses The Wildest Clan (1960; Dot Records DLP-3272 (mono); DLP-25272).
- The Four Amigos The Four Amigos (Capitol T 1617). Spanish-language version.
- The Four Amigos (Spain: 1962; Capitol EAP 5-1617).
- Perry Como Make Someone Happy (1962; RCA Victor Camden CAL 694).
- The Crew-Cuts High School Favorites (1962).
- Hawkshaw Hawkins Hawkshaw Hawkins Sings (April 1964; Camden CAS-808).
- The Righteous Brothers You've Lost That Lovin' Feelin' (US: January 1965; Philles Records PHLP-4007, LP-4007) (Canada: 1965; PHLP-4007, ST-90692, PHL-4007) (Germany: 1965; Metronome MLP 15183) (Scandinavia: 1967; Sonet SLPS 1917).
- Various Artists The Golden Years Of Rock' N Roll - Record One - 1948-1955 (UK: 1975; World Records SM 311) Gene and Eunice version.
- The Flamingos Flamingos (1976: Chess).
- Various Artists The Jake Porter Story (UK: 1983: Ace CH 84) Gene and Eunice's Combo version.
- Charlie Gracie Live At The Stockton Globe: August 26th 1957 (UK: 1983; Rollercoaster 2005).
- Joe Houston Rockin' at the Drive-In (1984) (2004; Ace) (2013 Ace).
- Gene and Eunice This is My Story (1985: Pathé Marconi 156136-1).
- Various Artists Rock Me All Night Long (Aladdin Records 1945-1958) (1986; EMI America ST-17201) Gene and Eunice version.
- Otis Williams and His Charms Sing Their All Time Hits (1988: King 570).
- The Collins Kids Television Party (TV 5758).
- Louis Armstrong 16 Original World Hits (Germany: 1989; MCA Records 8.62000 LZ).
- Various Artists The Rock 'N' Roll Era: Roots of Rock 1945-1956 (1989: Time-Life Music SRNR-30/2RNR-30 Warner Special Products OP-2570OPCD-2570) Gene and Eunice (Aladdin version).
- Hawkshaw Hawkins Hawk (1991: Bear Family BCD-15539).
- Louis Armstrong The ★ Collection (Germany: 1991: MCA Records MCD 17750) (Greece: 1991: MCA Records MCA 17750).
- Collins Kids Rockin' On T.V. (UK: 1993: Krazy Kat KKCD14).
- Gene and Eunice The Aladdin Records Story (1994; EMI Records EMI 308822).
- Otis Williams and His Charms Sing Their All Time Hits (1994: King Records).
- Louis Armstrong The Great Chicago Concert 1956 (1997: Jazz C2K 65119; Columbia 65119; Legacy/Sony 65119).
- Marvin & Johnny Cherry Pie: The Original Modern Recordings (1995) (1998; Ace) (2003; Ace) (2013; Ace).
- Charlie Gracie Live At The Stockton Globe: August 26th 1957 (UK: 1996; Schoolkids 1547).
- Gene and Eunice Lost Artists Vol. 2: Gene & Eunice--This is My Story (1998; Case 6002).
- Perry Como The Ultimate Collection (1998: BMG International).
- Sam Butera & the Witnesses Louis Prima Presents: The Wildest Clan/ Apache! (UK: November, 1998; Jasmine 346).
- Various Artists Rockin' Is Not Our Business!: 20 Crazy Covers of Rockin' R&B Classics 1950-58 (1998; Westside) features version by Betty Clooney & Bill Darnel with Sid Bass & His Orchestra.
- Gene and Eunice Go on Ko Ko Mo! (2001; Ace Records Ace 812) (Bear Family Records CDCHD812).
- The Bricats Welcome to Bricatannia (Germany: September 2002; Part Records 628.003).
- Various Artists King Hillbilly Bop 'n' Boogie: King/Federal's Roots of Rockabilly 1944-1956 (2002; Ace CDCHD854). Includes Jack Cardwell's version.
- Various Artists Surefire Hits On Central Avenue: The South Central R&B Scene (2003; Ace). Gene & Eunice version (2:43)
- Louis Armstrong Louis Armstrong Collection (2006: Legacy) features Velma Middleton.
- Various Artists From Boppin Hillbilly to Red Hot Rockabilly (2006; Proper Records Properbox103) features version by Hawkshaw Hawkins.
- Rosemary and Betty Clooney Sisters (2006: Sepia Records) features version by Betty Clooney and Bill Darnel.
- Various Artists They Sold A Million: Fifties (June 19, 2006: Alphadisc). Perry Como version.
- Sid Phillips and his band Any Old Iron (2007; Dutton Vocalion).
- Various Artists 50 Hot Rhythm & Blues Tunes from The R&B Years 1955: Volume One (UK: 2007; Boulevard Vintage BVDCD1012). Gene and Eunice version.
- Various Artists Gonna Shake This Shack Tonight! (Germany: 2007; Bear Family BCD16864). Hawkshaw Hawkins version.
- Otis Williams and His Charms Ivory Tower (January 2008; Forgotten Third).
- Rod Piazza & The Mighty Flyers Blues Quartet Soul Monster (2009; Delta Groove Productions / Wienerworld).
- Charlie Gracie Live At The Stockton Globe: August 26th 1957 (UK: 2009; Rollercoaster SKR1547).
- Various Artists Great British Rock 'n' Roll Volume 3 : Just About As Good As It (UK: February 2009; Smith & Co.) features The Rock 'n' Rollers version.
- Various Artists Jumping The Shuffle Blues: JAMAICAN SOUND SYSTEM CLASSICS 1946-1960 (UK: 2011; Fantastic Voyage FVTD087) Gene and Eunice version.
- Various Artists Great British Rock 'n' Roll Volume 5 : Just About As Good As It (UK: February 2011; Smith & Co.) features The Southlanders version.
- Various Artists Rumba Doowop Vol.1 1933-54 (March 2012; Rhythm & Blues) features The Flamingos version.
- Red Sovine Gonna Shake This Shack Tonight: Juke Joint Johnny (2012; Bear Family Records).
- The Flamingos The Chess Sessions.
- The Crests Collector's Gold Series (Trigger).
- Otis Williams and His Charms The Charms Vol. 2 (EP) (De Luxe 3664)
- Various Artists British Rock 'n' Roll, Skiffle and Early 60s U.K. Teeners: Embassy Label Rock 'n' Roll Volume 1. Features version by the Rock "N' Rollers.
- Various Artists Rock & Roll Hits Vol. 2: Chick's Are Jivin' (Bear Family Records CDTLR002). Hutton Sisters version.

== Videography ==
- Various Artists The Fabulous 50's Volume 4 (DVD) Features version by the Collins Kids.
- Various Artists SHINDIG! - The Complete Series Volumes 11 & 12 (DVD). Features The Righteous Brothers singing the song.
- Various Artists SHINDIG! - The Complete Series Volumes 23 & 24 (DVD). Features The Righteous Brothers singing the song.
