= Raleigh Hotel =

Raleigh Hotel may refer to:

- Raleigh Hotel (South Fallsburg, New York)
- Raleigh Hotel (Washington D.C.)
- Raleigh Hotel (Miami Beach)
- Sir Walter Raleigh Hotel
