= Nothing Was Delivered =

1975 song by Bob Dylan and the Band

Song by Bob Dylan & The Band

from the album The Basement Tapes
- Released: June 26, 1975
- Recorded: 1967
- Studio: West Saugerties, New York
- Genre: Rock
- Length: 4:23
- Label: Columbia
- Songwriter: Bob Dylan
- Producers: Bob Dylan; The Band

"Nothing Was Delivered"

Song by The Byrds

from the album Sweetheart of the Rodeo
- Released: August 30, 1968
- Recorded: March 15
- Studio: Columbia (Nashville, Tennessee)
- Genre: Country rock
- Length: 3:24
- Label: Columbia
- Songwriter: Bob Dylan
- Producer: Gary Usher

"Nothing Was Delivered" is a song written by Bob Dylan that was originally recorded by Dylan and The Band in the Fall of 1967 during the sessions that generated The Basement Tapes. The song was first released by The Byrds on their 1968 album Sweetheart of the Rodeo.

== Lyrics and music ==
"Nothing Was Delivered" has country music elements, as do other Basement Tapes songs. Several authors, including Rolling Stone writer Greil Marcus, have suggested that the song is based on Fats Domino's 1940 standard "Blueberry Hill." But critic Clinton Heylin has suggested that the melody may have been conceived spontaneously by Dylan or else based on a country music riff he may have heard sometime earlier.

A straightforward interpretation suggests that the lyrics describe a failed deal, possibly a drug deal, in which the promised goods were not delivered. An alternative interpretation is that the song is addressing politicians, or society's elites in general, who lie and don't deliver what they promise and are thus asked in the song to return what they have taken and explain their actions. Oliver Trager suggests a possible religious interpretation; that the singer is a preacher asking a church congregation to forgive an unspecified betrayal, perhaps even that of Judas Iscariot.

Music critic Robert Shelton considered the song as one of several of Dylan's songs from this period whose theme is the search for salvation. He also noted that it is one of several songs from the period that makes prominent use of the word "nothing" or "nowhere". He suggests a possible influence from King Lear, where these words also are used to great effect. Shelton also points out that the word "nothing" "echoes the artists dilemma: death versus life, vacuum versus harvest, isolation versus people, silence versus sound, the void versus life-impulse".

Philippe Margotin and Jean-Michel Guesdon describe the lyrics as dark and threatening. But Andy Gill describes the lyrics as "more sad than angry" about the betrayal, particularly the last line of the refrain, "Take care of yourself and get plenty of rest," which he describes as being an ambivalent expression suggesting both a threat and a caring farewell.

== Dylan and the Band version ==
Dylan and the Band recorded multiple versions of "Nothing Was Delivered" between September and October 1967 at the "Big Pink" house they were using in West Saugerties, New York. Two complete versions are known to exist as well as one fragment. The first version, which Heylin regards as more successful, was used for The Basement Tapes. This version begins with Richard Manuel playing on the piano. Dylan plays a 12-string guitar on this version. The other musicians are Robbie Robertson on guitar, Garth Hudson on organ, and Rick Danko on bass guitar, and Manuel and Danko provide backup vocals. Margotin and Guesdon note that the contrast between the heavy, threatening lyrics and light music is a key element of the song, and point out that Dylan has used a similar contrast in other songs on The Basement Tapes, such as "You Ain't Going Nowhere." Gill describes Dylan's vocal and Robertson's guitar being "of a piece, dramatic and intimate as if sharing confidences" about the incident described in the lyrics.

The two complete versions do not include drums. Levon Helm, the Band drummer who temporarily left the group earlier, stated in his autobiography that he played the drums for a recording of this song. The fragmentary version does include drums, but Heylin has suggested that this sounds more like Manuel's drumming style. He has suggested that this may mean that the Band may have recorded another version for possible inclusion on their own album.

== The Byrds version ==
Dylan had intended to donate "Nothing Was Delivered" to other singers rather than release it himself. It was one of fourteen songs from the Basement Tapes sessions that were circulated by Dylan's publishers in an effort to get other artists to record them. Byrds bassist Chris Hillman has stated that he personally received tapes in late 1967 or early 1968 that contained, among others, "Nothing Was Delivered" and "You Ain't Going Nowhere." Hillman stated that he received the tapes through Columbia Records, which was both the Byrds' and Dylan's record label. Byrds guitarist Roger McGuinn suggested that their producer Gary Usher may have been their source for the tapes stating that "We always had a good relationship with Dylan's publishers...we heard the songs, and we were as thrilled as you might have expected us to have been with this material.

The Byrds recorded "Nothing Was Delivered" in Nashville on March 15, 1968, for Sweetheart of the Rodeo, six days after having recorded "You Ain't Going Nowhere" there. McGuinn sang the lead vocal in what music critic Johnny Rogan described as McGuinn's "best Dylan imitation voice." Lloyd Green played pedal steel guitar and Byrds biographer Christopher Hjort assumes that Gram Parsons played the "unobtrusive" piano part. Drummer Kevin Kelley played in a rock style rather than a country style for the only time on the album, with Rogan noting that the contrast between the rock style drumming and the pedal steel guitar produced a "startling crescendo."

Hjort particularly praises McGuinn's arrangement, taking the song "from Dylan's triplet feel to a country shuffle." Music critic Johnny Rogan described the song as a "surprise highlight" of Sweetheart of the Rodeo, particularly praising McGuinn's vocal. Rolling Stone critic Rob Sheffield calls the Byrds' version "great" and "scary" and a "peak" of the Sweetheart of the Rodeo album. Reviewing Sweetheart of the Rodeo, New York Times critic William Kloman stated that the two songs written by Dylan were "treated with characteristic and confident tastefulness." Allmusic critic Rick Clark described them as "pure magic." On the other hand, music writer Sean Egan panned the song as being "overly mordant" and stated that the only notable aspect of the recording was that its bass line presented one of the few rock sounds on the album.

== Other versions ==
Buddy Emmons covered "Nothing Was Delivered" on his 1975 album Steel Guitar. Allmusic critic Eugene Chadbourne disliked the recording, stating that it sounded like it was being played by a wedding band. The Original Marauders covered the song on their 1977 album Now Your Mouth Cries Wolf.
