= Kevin Kelley (musician) =

American drummer

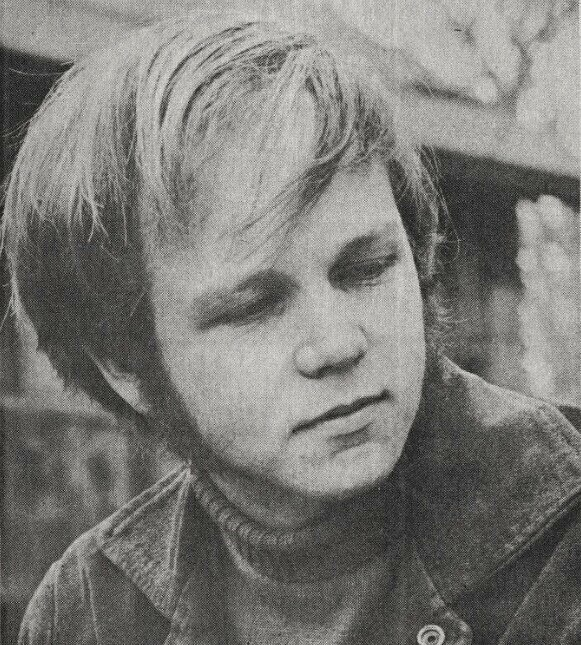
- Kelley in 1968

Background information
- Born: Kevin Daniel Kelley; March 25, 1943; Los Angeles County, California, U.S.
- Died: April 6, 2002 (aged 59) Hollywood
- Genres: Rock, country rock
- Occupations: Musician, songwriter
- Instrument: Drums
- Years active: 1965–1973
- Labels: Columbia, Ampex

Kevin Daniel Kelley (March 25, 1943 – April 6, 2002) was an American drummer, best known for his work with the rock bands the Byrds and the Rising Sons. Kelley also played drums for Fever Tree, although it is unknown whether he was an official member of the group or not. Kelley is the cousin of country rock pioneer and ex-member of the Byrds and the Flying Burrito Brothers, Chris Hillman.

He also worked as a session musician between 1969 and 1973, playing drums on albums by artists including John Fahey and Phil Ochs. He appears to have retired from the music industry after drumming on Michael Cohen's 1973 album, What Did You Expect?

Kelley should not be confused with the similarly named Kevin Kelly, another American session musician who played piano for Joan Baez during the Rolling Thunder Revue and guested on albums by Tim Buckley, Judee Sill, Bryn Haworth, and The Babys during the 1970s.

== Biography ==
=== Early life ===
Kelley began his musical career playing drums for the Beverly Hills High School band, before attending Santa Monica College and Los Angeles City College to study music and composition. Following his time at college, Kelley spent three years in the U.S. Marine Corps, including a year in Japan, where he became interested in Eastern spirituality and Buddhism.

=== The Rising Sons ===
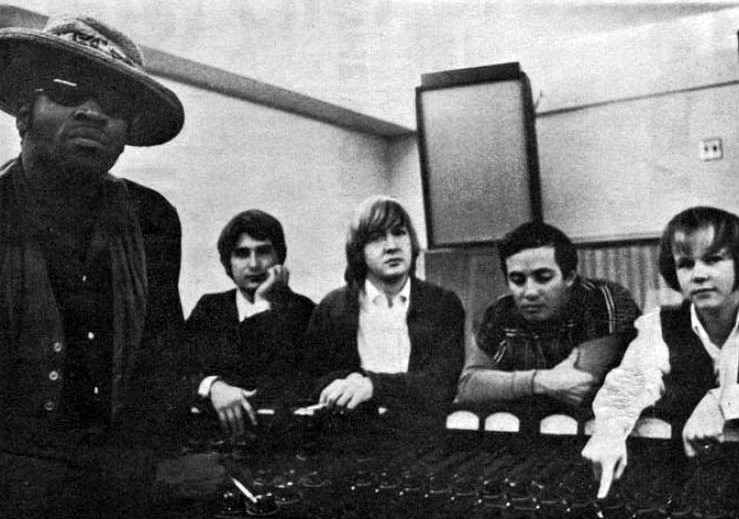
Kelley (far right) with the Rising Sons, 1966

In 1965, after returning to civilian life, he became the drummer with one of the earliest Los Angeles folk rock bands, the Rising Sons, a group that also included guitarists Ry Cooder and Taj Mahal. Kelley was brought in to replace the band's original drummer Ed Cassidy, who went on to join the jazz-influenced psychedelic rock band Spirit. Following Kelley's recruitment into the band, the Rising Sons were signed to Columbia Records and released the Reverend Gary Davis' song "Candy Man" as a single in 1966. The single failed to chart and the band broke up soon afterwards, leaving an albums worth of unreleased material that was not issued until the early 1990s.

During this period in his life, Kelley taught himself to play piano and guitar but he remained essentially a drummer.

=== The Byrds ===
Following the break-up of the Rising Sons, Kelley found himself without a band and consequently had to resort to working in a men's clothing store. It was while he was working at the clothing store that Kelley's cousin, Chris Hillman, who was the bass player with the successful L.A. folk rock and psychedelic band the Byrds, asked him to join the group in January 1968. The Byrds had recently been reduced to a duo following the October 1967 firing of rhythm guitarist David Crosby and the December 1967 departure of the band's original drummer, Michael Clarke. With a U.S. college tour looming, Hillman and his bandmate Roger McGuinn chose to recruit a drummer that they already knew, rather than hold time-consuming auditions.

Kelley holds the distinction of being the first non-original member to join The Byrds, although a second new recruit, Gram Parsons, came on board soon afterwards in February 1968. It was this four-piece line-up consisting of Kelley, Hillman, McGuinn, and Parsons that would record the seminal country rock album Sweetheart of the Rodeo between March and May 1968.

During the recording sessions for the album, the band attempted one of Kelley's own compositions titled "All I Have Are Memories", but ultimately the song was not included on the album and remained unreleased at the time. "All I Have Are Memories" was finally issued in an instrumental configuration as a bonus track on the 1997 expanded reissue of Sweetheart of the Rodeo, although it was erroneously credited to E. D. Hewitt and R. J. Ledford on that particular release. This error was corrected for the 2003 Legacy Edition of Sweetheart of the Rodeo, which presented the song with Kelley's lead vocal intact for the first time.

In addition to participating in the recording of Sweetheart of the Rodeo, Kelley was also with the Byrds when they made their infamous appearance at the Grand Ole Opry in Nashville on March 15, 1968, where the band was met with booing and heckling from the audience, due to their association with the hippie counterculture. In the years since the incident, the band's appearance at the Grand Ole Opry has taken on near-legendary status among fans of the Byrds and Gram Parsons.

Following the release of Sweetheart of the Rodeo, Kelley was dismissed from the Byrds in September 1968, largely due to pressure from the group's new lead guitarist Clarence White, who had come on board as a replacement for Gram Parsons in July 1968.

=== Fever Tree and session work ===
After leaving the Byrds, Kelley next contributed drums to the psychedelic rock band Fever Tree's fourth album, For Sale, although it is unknown whether he was a fully-fledged member of the band or was simply hired as a sideman to embellish the album.

He was also a member of the band Gas Food & Lodging in 1972 and participated in the recording of 22 tracks with the band which were released in 2017 as downloads by CD Baby, under the title On the Great Highway.

Between 1969 and 1973, Kelley found work as a session musician, guesting on albums by John Fahey, Phil Ochs, Frank Kinsel, Jerry Jeff Walker, Judee Sill, Jesse Wolff & Whings, and Michael Cohen. Following the release of Cohen's What Did You Expect? album in 1973, Kelley appears to have retired from the music business and little is known about his subsequent life.

=== Death ===
Kevin Kelley died of natural causes in North Hollywood on April 6, 2002. Although most published sources dealing with his career as a professional musician state that Kelley's year of birth was 1945, which would have made him either 56 or 57 at the time of his death, his obituary in the Los Angeles Times listed his age as being 59, making his year of birth 1943. It is unknown which of these birth years is correct. According to the Social Security Death Index (SSDI) his birth date was March 25, 1943.

== Selected discography ==
NOTE: Sources for this discography are as follows:

=== Rising Sons ===
- "Candy Man"/"The Devil's Got My Woman" (7" single – 1966)
- Rising Sons Featuring Taj Mahal and Ry Cooder (compilation album – 1992)
- The Rising Sons (compilation album – 2001)

=== The Byrds ===
- "You Ain't Goin' Nowhere"/"Artificial Energy" (7" single – 1968) – Kevin Kelley only appears on "You Ain't Goin' Nowhere"
- Sweetheart of the Rodeo (studio album – 1968)
- "I Am a Pilgrim"/"Pretty Boy Floyd" (7" single – 1968)

=== Fever Tree ===
- For Sale (studio album – 1970)
- "She Comes in Colors"/"You're Not the Same Baby" (7" single – 1970)
- "I Put a Spell on You"/"Hey Joe, Where You Gonna Go" (7" single – 1970)

=== Gas, Food & Lodging ===
- On the Great Highway (22 tracks released as downloads – 2017)

=== Album guest appearances ===
- John Fahey – The Yellow Princess (1969)
- Bernie Schwartz - The Wheel (1970)
- Frank Kinsel – At Home (1971)
- Jesse Wolff & Whings – Jesse Wolff & Whings (1972)
- Michael Cohen – What Did You Expect? (1973)
- Phil Ochs – Gunfight at Carnegie Hall (1975, recorded in 1970)
- Judee Sill – Dreams Come True (2005, recorded in the 1970s)
