= Joe Houston =

American jazz musician

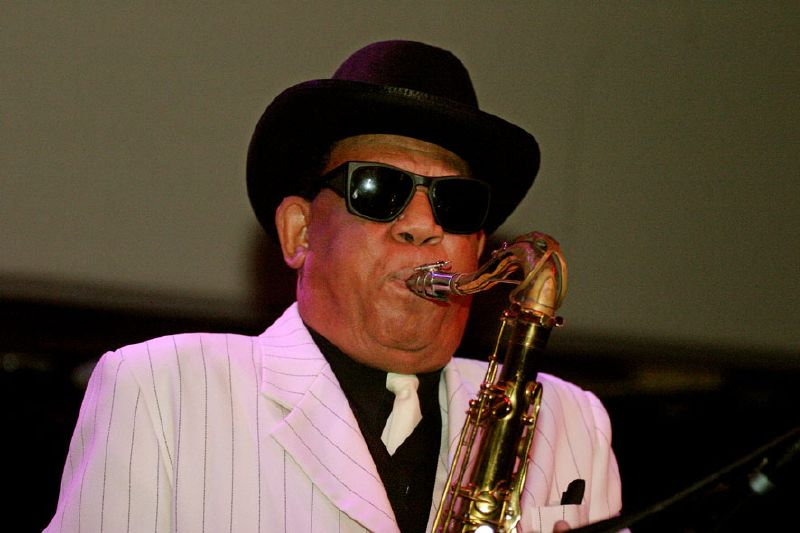

Background information
- Born: 12 July 1926
- Died: 28 December 2015 (aged 89)
- Occupation: Musician
- Instrument: Saxophone
- Label: Freedom Recording Co.

Joseph Abraham Houston (July 12, 1926 – December 28, 2015) was an American tenor saxophonist who played jazz and rhythm and blues.

== Biography ==
He was born in Bastrop, a suburb of Austin, Texas, and studied trumpet in school, changing to saxophone later. As a teen he began emulating a touring band by buying a red suit with white pants. One night in 1941 a saxophone player did not show for a gig with the band and Houston took his place. Between 1943 and 1946, Houston toured with King Kolax's band through Kansas City and Chicago and throughout the Mid-West.

After World War II, Houston returned to Texas, and recorded with the pianist Amos Milburn and singer Big Joe Turner. Initially playing alto sax, he switched to tenor in the wake of such "honking" saxophonists as Big Jay McNeely, Wild Bill Moore, Paul Williams, Hal Singer and Chuck Higgins. Turner got Houston his first recording contract on Freedom Records in 1949. Houston moved to Baton Rouge, Louisiana, and played with Wynonie Harris, Savannah Churchill and Betty Roche.

Eventually, Houston formed his own band The Rockets, and moved to Los Angeles in 1952. He scored his only two chart hit singles in 1952 with "Worry, Worry, Worry", and "Hard Time Baby" both of which peaked at number 10 on Billboard's R&B singles chart. He recorded for many record companies, including Freedom, Macy's, Modern, Crown, RPM, Combo, Imperial, Bayou, and the Recorded In Hollywood/Lucky/Money/Cash group of labels, and contributed vocals as well as tenor saxophone on some of his records.

Houston was based in Los Angeles throughout most of his career. He toured and recorded with his band 'The Defrosterz', started up by Mark St. John, who acted as his bassist and manager for almost 20 years, plus the keyboardist Mike Malone. They toured North America and recorded throughout the 1990s and 2000s. The band was signed to the Shattered Records label.

Houston's musical career stalled after he suffered a stroke in 2006. He returned to the stage in July 2008 and performed at the Long Beach Lobster Festival. He continued to entertain until 2012. He died on December 28, 2015, in Long Beach, California, following some more health issues.

== Singles ==
Year	Title	Album	US R&B
1952	"Worry, Worry, Worry"	not released on LP	10
1952	"Hard Time Baby"	not released on LP	10

== Albums ==
- Joe Houston (Combo, 1955)
- Rockin' At The Drive In (Combo, 1956)
- Blows All Nite Long (Modern, 1956)
- Rocks and Rolls All Nite Long (Crown, 1957) reissue of Blows All Nite Long
- Rock and Roll with Joe Houston and His Rockets (Tops, 1957)
- Wild Man of the Tenor Sax (Crown, 1961)
- Doin' The Twist (Crown, 1962)
- Twisting in Orbit (Crown, 1962)
- Rockin' and Rollin' (Crown, 1962)
- Surf Rockin' (Crown, 1963)
- Limbo (Crown, 1963)
- Kicking Back (Big Town, 1978)
- The Return of Honk! with Otis Grand (JSP, 1994)
- The Blues & Nothin' Else (Shattered Music, 1996)
