= Luke McDaniel =

American singer-songwriter

- Born: Luke Jefferson McDaniel; February 3, 1927; Laurel, Mississippi, U.S.
- Died: June 27, 1992 (aged 65) Mobile, Alabama, U.S.
- Genres: country; Rockabilly
- Occupations: Singer, songwriter, guitarist
- Instruments: Guitar, vocals
- Years active: 1950–1970s
- Labels: Trumpet, Meladee, Big Howdy, Astro, Big B, King

Luke McDaniel (February 3, 1927 – June 27, 1992), who also recorded under the stage name Jeff Daniels, was an American country and rockabilly music singer and songwriter. He was the grandfather of Mississippi state senator Chris McDaniel.

== Biography ==
McDaniel was born in Laurel, Mississippi and raised on a farm. He learned to play mandolin in high school, playing in local churches and public events. In 1945, he formed his own band, which opened for Hank Williams at a show in New Orleans in 1950. In 1952, he auditioned for Trumpet Records, but was initially turned down for a recording session. After Trumpet label head Lillian McMurry asked him to return with better songwriting material, he wrote "This Crying Heart", modeled after Williams's hit "Your Cheatin' Heart", which convinced McMurry to sign him for a recording contract. He recorded three songs with Jimmy Swan's backing band, including the single "Whoa Boy", which Trumpet issued later in 1952; the song became a regional hit in New Orleans. Following Williams's death, McDaniel wrote a song titled "A Tribute to Hank Williams, My Buddy"; Trumpet released the single with low fidelity mastering, and it did not sell well.

He then moved to Mobile, Alabama and played with Jack Cardwell, a star on local radio and television station WKAB. He became a regular on the "Tom 'N Jack" show, and in 1953 Cardwell's label, King Records, signed him. He recorded several singles for King, the most successful of which was "Drive In". On the strength of his releases on Trumpet and King, he was invited to play on the radio program Louisiana Hayride. He moved to New Orleans in 1954, where he also recorded for Mel-A-Dee Records.

In 1956, he was persuaded by friends Elvis Presley and Carl Perkins to send a demo recording to Sam Phillips, who signed him to his label Sun Records. McDaniel recorded two sessions with Sun, but left the label over a contract dispute. None of the Sun sides were released until Charly Records compiled them decades later.

Following this, he signed with Big Howdy Records and released records under the name Jeff Daniel, but was unable to score a hit record under this name, either. He continued recording into the 1970s.

== Legacy ==
Buddy Holly performed his song "Midnight Shift" (written under the pseudonym Earl Lee), and The Byrds covered his "You're Still on My Mind" on their album Sweetheart of the Rodeo. George Jones and Jim Reeves also covered McDaniel's songs.

== Discography ==
=== Singles ===
as Luke McDaniel or Luke McDaniels

Year	Title	Record label
1952	Whoa, Boy! / No More	Trumpet Records
1953	A Tribute To Hank Williams, My Buddy / This Cryin’ Heart	Trumpet Records
1953	Drive On / Let Me Be A Souvenir	King Records
1953	I Can't Go / For Old Times Sake	King Records
1954	The Automobile Song / I Can't Steal Another's Bridge	King Records
1954	Honey Won't You Please Come Home / Crying My Heart Out For You	King Records
1954	Money Bag Woman / Hurts Me So	King Records
1955	One More Heart / Living in a House Of Sin	King Records

as Jeff Daniels

Year	Title	Record label
1956	Daddy-O Rock / Hey Woman!	Meladee Records
1959	Switch Blade Sam / You’re Still on My Mind	Big Howdy Records
1959	Uh-Huh-Huh / Table For Two	Big B Records
1960	Foxy Dan / Some Day You’ll Remember	Astro Records
197?	Uh-Huh-Huh / Table For Two	Big Howdy Records
197?	Foxy Dan / Bye Bye Baby	Big Howdy Records
197?	Hard Luck / Johnny's	Big Howdy Records
197?	I Tried / I’m Tired Of These Country Ways	Big Howdy Records
197?	Switch Blade Sam / You’re Still on My Mind	Big Howdy Records
	Go Ahead Baby; Huh Babe	Sun Records (not issued)
	High High High; My Baby Don't Rock; That's What I Tell My Heart	Sun Records (not issued)

=== Compilation album ===
- 1996 – Daddy-O-Rock – The Rock And Country Sides Of: Luke McDaniel, Hydra Records
