= Rising Sons =

American folk rock band (1965–1966)

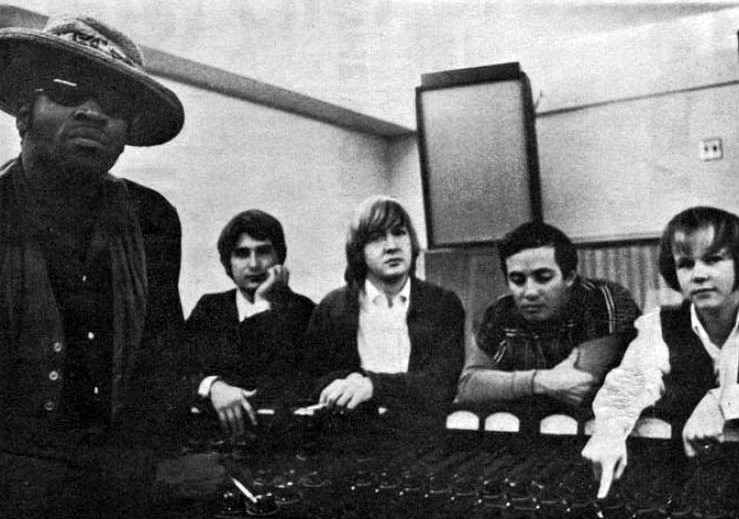
- Rising Sons in 1965; From left: Taj Mahal, Jesse Lee Kincaid, Gary Marker, Ry Cooder and Kevin Kelley

Background information
- Origin: Los Angeles, California, U.S.
- Genres: Folk rock
- Years active: 1965–1966
- Label: Columbia
- Past members: Ed Cassidy; Ry Cooder; Kevin Kelley; Jesse Lee Kincaid; Taj Mahal; Gary Marker

Rising Sons was an American folk-rock band formed in Los Angeles in 1965. Their initial career was short-lived, but the group found retrospective fame for launching the careers of singer Taj Mahal and guitarist Ry Cooder.

== History ==
The original lineup was a 17-year-old Ry Cooder (vocals, six- and 12-string guitar, mandolin, slide and bottleneck guitar, dobro), Taj Mahal (vocals, harmonica, guitar, piano), Gary Marker (bass), Jesse Lee Kincaid (born Nick Gerlach, vocals and guitar) and Ed Cassidy (drums). Cassidy left in 1965 after injuring his wrist playing a monumental version of "Statesboro Blues" with the band. He was replaced by Kevin Kelley.

The group often played at the Los Angeles clubs The Troubadour and The Ash Grove. They were signed by Columbia Records. Their only album, produced by Terry Melcher, was not issued at the time. In February 1966, in conjunction with a two-week engagement at The Trip club on the Sunset Strip, the band released their first and only single, "Candy Man" backed with "The Devil's Got My Woman". The group disbanded in late 1966.

They were contemporaries of the famous Los Angeles band The Byrds; fans wondered which band would be the bigger success, until the Byrds' album Mr. Tambourine Man became a hit. Recordings by Rising Sons were widely bootlegged and nearly three decades later were released by Columbia Records under the title Rising Sons Featuring Taj Mahal and Ry Cooder (1992). "We were the problem," remembered Marker later. "We had difficulties distilling our multiple musical agendas down to a product that would sell. We had no actual leader, no clear musical vision.... I think [Melcher] went out of his way to make us happy – within the scope of his knowledge. He tried just about everything he could, including the live, acoustic session that produced '2:10 Train.'"

== After Rising Sons ==
Mahal went on to become a prominent solo blues and folk performer. Cooder and Marker played with Captain Beefheart and his Magic Band. Cooder went on to become a prominent session musician, recorded numerous albums under his own name, and scored several soundtracks. Kincaid attended the California Institute of the Arts on a classical guitar scholarship and left the United States for six years in Europe. His music album, Brief Moments Full Measure, and his book, Ibiza Chronicles, were released in 2014. He currently resides in Mill Valley, California. Cassidy founded the band Spirit. Kelley became a member of his cousin Chris Hillman's band The Byrds in 1968, playing on their seminal album Sweetheart of the Rodeo.

Marker retired from the music industry but maintained an active interest (especially in Beefheart-related matters) until he died of a stroke, on December 8, 2015, at the age of 72.

== Influence ==
According to AllMusic, Rising Sons' "languid, bluesy, folksy sort of sound anticipated future recordings by outfits like Moby Grape, Buffalo Springfield, the Grateful Dead, and even the southern rock Allman Brothers, and the country-rock Byrds."

== Members ==
According to Marc Kirkeby's 1992 liner notes, except where noted:

- Taj Mahal – vocals, harmonica, guitar, piano (1965–1966)
- Ry Cooder – vocals; six- and twelve-string guitars; mandolin; slide and resonator guitars (1965–1966)
- Jesse Lee Kincaid – vocals, guitar (1965–1966)
- Gary Marker – bass guitar (1965–1966; died 2015)
- Ed Cassidy – drums (1965; died 2012)
- Kevin Kelley – drums, percussion (1965–1966; died 2002)

== Discography ==
=== Singles ===
Year	Single details
1966	"Candy Man" b/w "The Devil's Got My Woman": Released: February 1966; Recorded: October 6, 1965; Label: Columbia (4-43534)

=== Albums ===
Year	Album details
1992	Rising Sons Featuring Taj Mahal and Ry Cooder: Released: September 11, 1992; Recorded: September 9, 1965 – May 18, 1966 and June 19, 1992; Label: Columbia/Legacy (CK-52828)
