= Mel Williams =

Australian rules footballer

Melville Williams

Personal information
- Full name: Melville Williams
- Born: 1 June 1926
- Died: 25 September 2003 (aged 77)
- Original team: Tooronga
- Height: 191 cm (6 ft 3 in)
- Weight: 91 kg (201 lb)

Playing career^{1}
Years	Club	Games (Goals)
1948–50	Hawthorn	44 (18)
- ^{1} Playing statistics correct to the end of 1950.

Mel Williams (1 June 1926 – 25 September 2003) was an Australian rules footballer who played with Hawthorn in the Victorian Football League (VFL).
