= Raleigh Hotel (South Fallsburg, New York) =

Resort hotel in New York, US

Coordinates: 41°40′46.1″N 74°37′58.9″W

The Raleigh Hotel in 1978

The Raleigh Hotel was a resort hotel in South Fallsburg, New York, within the Borscht Belt region of the Catskill Mountains.

The Raleigh temporarily closed in December 2005 and reopened the following year under new ownership as a retreat mainly for Orthodox Jews. As of 2024, it operates as the HCS Resort.

== History ==
The hotel was established in 1937 as a kosher resort catering mostly to Jewish (observant and non-observant) travelers, as well as guests of other religions. Situated on 200 acres (81 ha) of land roughly 90 miles (140 km) from New York City, the Raleigh hosted entertainers of the day such as Sammy Davis Jr., Jackie Mason, Milton Berle, Totie Fields, Eddie Fisher, Andy Gibb, Chubby Checker, and Rodney Dangerfield. For many decades, Barry Frank was the master of ceremonies at the resort.

Raleigh Hotel co-owner George Gilbert died in 1988. The hotel's other longtime owner, Mannie Halbert, the widower of Gilbert's sister Nettie Halbert, died in 2004. A court dispute between his two daughters over his estate, Matter of Halbert, was settled in a Sullivan County, New York court in 2010.
