= Sid Phillips (musician) =

British jazz musician (1907–1973)

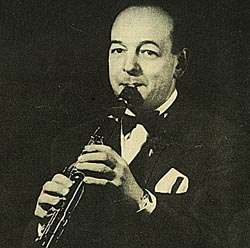

Background information
- Born: Isador Simon Phillips; 14 June 1907; London, United Kingdom
- Died: 24 May 1973 (aged 65) Chertsey, United Kingdom
- Genres: Jazz
- Occupation: Musician
- Instrument: Clarinet
- Labels: Variety, Vocalion, Brunswick, Columbia

Isadore Simon Phillips (14 June 1907 – 24 May 1973) was a British jazz clarinettist, bandleader and arranger. He was once known as "England's King of the Clarinet".

== Early life and education ==
Phillips was born in London, England, into a Jewish family. He learned violin and piano as a child, taught himself music theory and harmony, and played reeds in his teens as a member of his brother's European band. His first stage appearance was in 1923 at the People's Palace, Mile End. He got into the music business as a freelance arranger and musical director for the Edison Bell Gramophone Company.

== Career ==
In 1930, Phillips joined the Denmark Street music publisher Lawrence Wright as staff arranger and began writing arrangements for Bert Ambrose, joining Ambrose's ensemble in 1933 and remaining there until 1937. Later in the 1930s, Phillips played in the United States on radio and freelance in clubs. He served in the Royal Air Force during the Second World War, then put together his own quartet in 1946 and (under the name Simon Phillips) wrote several pieces for the BBC Symphony Orchestra, including the Overture Russe in 1946, which was conducted by Adrian Boult.

During World War II Phillips served as an intelligence officer for five years. After the war he mainly played in groups that worked in a Dixieland style. He led a quintet of his own formation from 1949, and his sidemen variously included George Shearing, Colin Bailey, Tommy Whittle and Kenny Ball. This basic instrumentation set the style of his work through extensive touring, appearances at social functions, many broadcasts and recordings. His last appearance was in Nottingham on 14 April 1973, guesting with Jazz Spectrum. He died in Chertsey, Surrey, in 1973, aged 65.

=== Recordings ===
Phillips's first recordings under his own name were made in 1928, and he continued to record as a leader into the 1970s. His compositions, mostly for the Ambrose band, include Cotton Pickers' Congregation, Night Ride and Streamline Strut. In 1937 through 1938, a number of his recordings were issued in the United States, through a contract he signed with Irving Mills and issued on Mills' Variety label, as well as Vocalion, Brunswick and Columbia labels, most recordings were made in England. The "England's King of the Clarinet' tag emerged post-war, when he and his Dixieland band made around 200 recordings for His Master's Voice, including signature tunes Hors d'oeuvres, and Clarinet Cadenza. On The Fabulous Mr Phillips (1958, reissued 2003) he revisited some of the best known music from his whole career, adding strings to the orchestrations.

== Family ==
Phillips' younger brother Woolf Phillips (1919–2003) was a successful trombonist, arranger and musical director who conducted at the London Palladium. His two other brothers, Ralph (banjo, double bass) and Harry (trumpet, violin) were also musicians: the four brothers formed The Melodians in 1925. His son, Simon, is a drummer, songwriter and record producer and started his career in his father's big band. His nephew was saxophonist, composer and bandleader John Altman.

== In popular culture ==
- One of Phillips' songs, "Boogie Man", is included in the 2008 video game Fallout 3 and the 2016 television series Stranger Things.
- His rendition of the song Heartaches is sampled in the opening track of The Caretaker's final project Everywhere at the End of Time.
