= The Southlanders =

Jamaican British vocal group

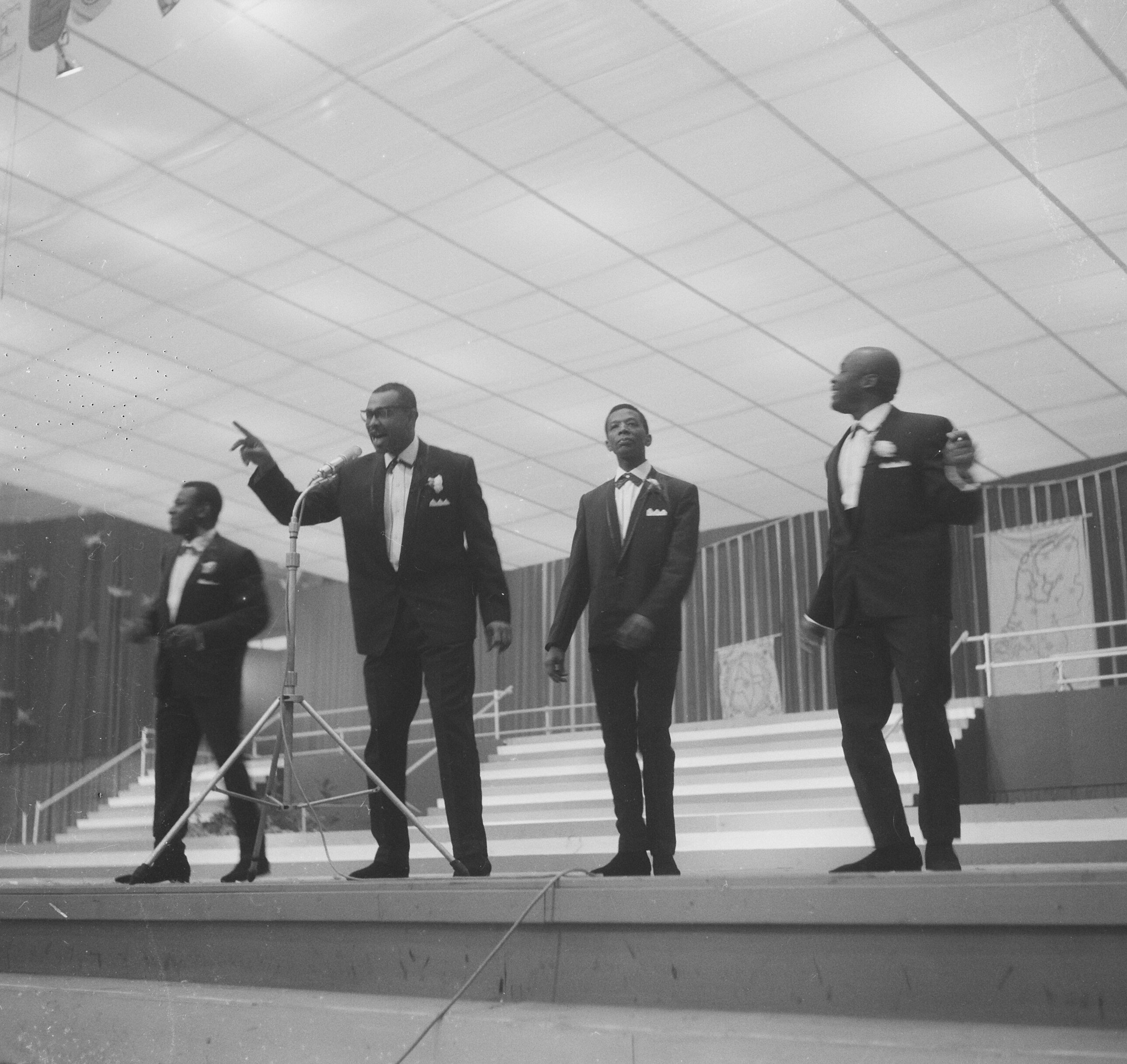
- The Southlanders performing in Utrecht, Netherlands in 1964

Background information
- Also known as: The Caribbeans, The Southerners, The South Londoners
- Origin: London, England
- Genres: rhythm and blues, calypso, doo-wop
- Years active: 1950 – c. 2004
- Label: Decca Records
- Past members: Vernon Nesbeth (d. 2017); Frank Mannah (d. 1991); Harold (Harry) Wilmot (d. 1961); Allan Wilmot (d. 2021)

The Southlanders was a Jamaican and British vocal group formed in 1950 by Edric Connor and Vernon Nesbeth.

Nesbeth had received singing lessons from Connor, and when the latter decided to record an album of Jamaican songs, he asked Nesbeth to assemble a vocal backing group. Besides Nesbeth, other members of the group were Frank Mannah, and brothers Harold (Harry) and Allan Wilmot. Songs from Jamaica (Argo RG33) was released in 1954 with the group credited as "The Caribbeans". Connor persuaded the group to appear with him in cabaret in London's Celebrity Restaurant to promote the album.

During the following year, the group was briefly known as "The South Londoners" and "The Southerners", but when they made their second recording providing harmony vocals to Connor on Songs from Trinidad (1955, Argo RG57), the group had settled on the name The Southlanders. They later recorded a third album with Connor.

The group's biggest commercial hit, and its only appearance in the UK Singles Chart, was their 1957 cover version of "Alone", which sold more than one million copies. "Alone", released by Decca Records, entered the Chart on 22 November 1957 and spent 10 weeks in the chart, peaking at number 17 on 28 November.

The group's final single, "Imitation of Love", was released in 1961.

The song the group is most identified with is "I am a Mole and I Live in a Hole" (also known as "Mole", "The Mole" and "The Mole in a Hole"). The title line from the song was spoken by the group's bass voice Harry Wilmot, father of Gary Wilmot. Harry Wilmot died in 1961, when his son was six years old. The song failed to make the UK Singles Chart in 1958, but has been performed at every Southlanders' event since its release. Group founder Vernon Nesbeth said that the group tried to take the song out of their set but that club managers and audiences insisted upon hearing it. "It's become protected. Untouchable. We've even sung it in Japanese," said Nesbeth.

When its profile began to wane, the group performed in cabaret on cruise ships and in hotels until it disbanded. Nesbeth semi-retired in January 2004 to reside in Spain; he died on 6 March 2017 in Torrevieja. Allan Wilmot retired and resided in South London. He died on 20 October 2021, at the age of 96.
