= Barry Frank =

American singer

Barry Frank (September 1930 – December 2, 2016) was a smooth-voiced 1950s and early 1960s pop and rock and roll vocalist who professionally recorded numerous 78s, 45s, 33s, and extended play/long play albums for Bell, Columbia, Jubilee, Seeco and other record companies in the United States and Europe. In many cases, Frank covered recordings debuted by other artists. These included songs like "Party Doll", "Earth Angel" and "The Great Pretender". In addition to his solo work, Frank also had a brief stint as the lead singer of the Sammy Kaye orchestra.

Although his hit recording career did not lead to permanent stardom, Frank continued performing. For many decades, he was master of ceremonies (emcee) of the Raleigh Hotel in South Fallsburg, New York, from the 1970s through the 2000s (when the hotel closed), and also performed as a singer at other Catskills resorts on off nights. He retired from performing due to illness, and returned to New York City, but continued to live independently. Frank died of natural causes, aged 86 on December 2, 2016.

== Releases by Bell Records ==
- Cat. #1051 – "Sh-Boom"
- Cat. #1059 – "Smile" and "If I Give My Heart to You"
- Cat. #1063 – "Mama, Don't Cry at My Wedding" and "Fortune in Dreams"
- Cat. #1077 – "Hold Me in Your Arms" and "The Naughty Lady of Shady Lane"
- Cat. #1089 – "Ko Ko Mo (I Love You So)" and "Earth Angel"
- Cat. #1109 – "Only You (And You Alone)" and "Black Denim Trousers and Motorcycle Boots"
- Cat. #1118 – "Go On with the Wedding" and "The Great Pretender"
- Cat. #1123 – "Why Do Fools Fall in Love" and "I'll Be Home"
- Cat. #16 – "A Rose and a Baby Ruth"
- Cat. #19 – "Love Me"
- Cat. #21 – "Banana Boat Song" and "Jamaica Farewell"
- Cat. #23 – "Young Love"
- Cat. #24 – "The Moonlight Gambler"
- Cat. #25 – "Too Much"
- Cat. #31 – "Teen-Age Crush" and "Party Doll"
- Cat. #36 – "First Date, First Kiss, First Love"
- Cat. #37 – "Ninety-nine Ways"
- Cat. #45 – "(Let Me Be Your) Teddy Bear" and "I'm Gonna Sit Right Down and Write Myself a Letter"
- Cat. #52 – "Diana"
- Cat. #58 – "Chances Are"
- Cat. #59 – "Wake Up Little Susie"
- Cat. #61 – "Lips of Wine"
- Cat. #64 – "You Send Me" and "My Special Angel"
- Cat. #67 – "When I Am with You"
- Cat. #68 – "At the Hop"
- Cat. #73 – "Oh-oh, I'm Falling in Love Again"
- Cat. #79 – "Twilight Time"
- Cat. #83 – "Make Me a Miracle" and "Return to Me"
- Cat. #131 – "If I Had a Girl" and "Pretty Blue Eyes" (under the pseudonym "Frank Rich")
- Cat. #134 – "Go, Jimmy, Go" (under the pseudonym "Frank Rich")
- Cat. #136 – "Beyond the Sea" (under the pseudonym "Scott Howard")
- Cat. #141 – "Puppy Love" (under the pseudonym "Larry Todd")

== Releases by outside labels, in the United States and other countries ==
- "I'll Dance You" and "If You Want My Heart", New-Disc (5075)
- "Shelly Baby" and "Ella, Her Fellow, and a Striped Umbrella", Mohawk Records (137)
- "Jimmy's Girl" and "Corrina, Corrina", RCA Italiana (45N-1157, Italy)
- "Jimmy's Girl" and "The Story of My Love", CRC (8005, Chile)
- "Frisky", Jubilee (45–5227)
- "Tick Tock" (with Budd Smith and Danny Mendelsohn and his Orchestra), X (4X-0050)
- "Rubber Ball", Discofoon (FF 136, the Netherlands)
- "Calendar Girl", Iberofon (extended play IB-45-1032, Spain)
- "Love Is All We Need" and "Ever-Changing World", Mark (M-140)
- "Take Good Care of Her", X (45X-2004, Italy)
- "Nicolasa" and "In the Hall of the Cha-Cha King", Seeco (45–4176)
- "My Cocalita" and "The Gay Merengue", Seeco (45–4195)
- "Shy" (with Belmonte and his Orchestra), Columbia (4–40607)
- "The Lonely One" (with Belmonte and his Orchestra), Columbia (4–40763)
- "Tonight (Could Be the Night)", RCA Victor (47–9357, Germany)
- "Tonight My Love, Tonight", RCA Victor (47–9351, Germany)
- "Sway" and "Lonely Teenager", RCA Italiana (45N-1168, Italy)

== Releases by Columbia Records as a member of Sammy Kaye's orchestra ==
Studio album

- Serenade of the Bells (CL 1173, 1958)

Singles

- "Mountain of Kisses" (4–40839)
- "What a Saturday Night" and "A Young Lover's Dream" (4–40909)
- "Charm Bracelet" (4–40936)
- "Moonlight Swim" (4–40988)
- "Ha! Ha! Ha!" (4–41028)
- "Garden of Allah" (4–41084)
- "That Girl Next Door" and "Our First Formal Dance" (4–41140)
- "Why Can't This Night Go On Forever" (4–41206)
