= Jack Cardwell =

American singer-songwriter (1925–1993)

Jack Cardwell (November 9, 1925 – October 22, 1993) was an American country music singer, songwriter, and disk jockey.

== Biography ==
Cardwell was raised on a farm in Chapman, Alabama and was self-taught on guitar. He attended the Barton Academy and worked as an electrician for the port at Mobile.

Cardwell became a radio personality on Mobile-based radio station WKAB in the early 1950s, where he hosted the Tom 'n Jack Show. Around 1952 he also debuted on local television, hosting the Friendly Variety Show until 1967. His radio and television platforms helped launch the careers of musicians such as Luke McDaniel and Curly Brooks. Shortly after Hank Williams died, Cardwell wrote and recorded a tribute titled "The Death of Hank Williams" and released it on King Records. The song reached #3 on the Billboard charts in 1953. He also had a top-ten hit that year with "Dear Joan".

In 1969, Cardwell had another chart hit, "Jesus Was a Soul Man", which Andrew Lloyd Webber and Tim Rice later identified as one of the influences on the creation of Jesus Christ Superstar.
