= You Ain't Goin' Nowhere =

1967 song by Bob Dylan

Song by Bob Dylan

from the album Bob Dylan's Greatest Hits Vol. II
- Released: November 17, 1971
- Recorded: September 24, 1971
- Genre: Country rock
- Length: 2:41
- Label: Columbia
- Songwriter: Bob Dylan
- Producer: Leon Russell

"You Ain't Goin' Nowhere" is a song written by the American musician Bob Dylan in 1967 in Woodstock, New York, during the self-imposed exile from public appearances that followed his July 29, 1966 motorcycle accident. A recording of Dylan performing the song in September 1971 was released on the Bob Dylan's Greatest Hits Vol. II album in November of that year, marking the first official release of the song by its author. Earlier 1967 recordings of the song, performed by Dylan and the Band, were issued on the 1975 album The Basement Tapes and the 2014 album The Bootleg Series Vol. 11: The Basement Tapes Complete.

The Byrds recorded a version of the song in 1968 and issued it as a single. This was the first commercial release of the song, predating Dylan's own release by three years. A later cover by ex-Byrds members Roger McGuinn and Chris Hillman reached the top 10 of the Hot Country Songs charts in 1989.

"You Ain't Goin' Nowhere" has also been covered by many other artists, including Joan Baez, Unit 4 + 2, and Glen Hansard with Markéta Irglová.

== Bob Dylan's versions ==
=== 1967 versions ===
Starting in June 1967 and ending in October 1967, Bob Dylan's writing and recording sessions with the Band (then known as the Hawks) in the basement of their house in Woodstock, New York, known as "Big Pink", were the source of many new songs. "You Ain't Goin' Nowhere" was written and recorded during this period and features lyrics that allude to the singer waiting for his bride to arrive and, possibly, a final premarital fling.

The song is in the key of G major, and has been described by author Clinton Heylin as, "one of those songs where Dylan never quite settled on a single set of lyrics." In its earliest recorded version, Dylan had a tune, the last line of each verse, and a chorus, but the song featured a stream of improvised, absurdist lyrics, including, "Now look here, dear soup/You'd best feed the cats/The cats need feeding", and "Just pick up that oil cloth, cram it in the corn/I don't care if your name is Michael/You're gonna need some boards/Get your lunch, you foreign bib". This first take was not officially released until 2014's The Bootleg Series Vol. 11: The Basement Tapes Complete.

Dylan changed the song's lyrics soon afterwards, with authors Philippe Margotin and Jean-Michel Guesdon remarking that, in the final 1967 draft, the first verse sounds like a weather report: "Clouds so swift/Rain won't lift/Gate won't close/Railings froze/Get your mind off wintertime". The pair also describe the finished lyrics as being surrealist, with the narrator waiting for his bride to arrive, before flying "down in the easy chair", and even name-dropping Mongol ruler Genghis Khan. This second 1967 version of "You Ain't Goin' Nowhere" was circulated by Dylan's publisher as a demo for fellow artists to record and was first officially released on Dylan's 1975 The Basement Tapes album.

Margotin and Guesdon have described the sound of this version as having "a country music tone, to the point of sounding like a tribute to Hank Williams". They also describe Dylan's singing voice in the recording as being laid-back, while he accompanies himself on a 12-string acoustic guitar, backed by Rick Danko on bass, Garth Hudson on organ, Richard Manuel on piano, and Robbie Robertson on drums (the Band's drummer Levon Helm had temporarily left the group at this point). An additional electric guitar part may have been overdubbed in 1975, just prior to the song's release on The Basement Tapes album.

=== 1971 version ===
"You Ain't Goin' Nowhere (1971 version)"
The 1971 version of "You Ain't Goin' Nowhere", recorded with Happy Traum and released on Bob Dylan's Greatest Hits Vol. II.

Although Dylan had recorded "You Ain't Goin' Nowhere" in 1967, he didn't release a version of the song until 1971's Bob Dylan's Greatest Hits Vol. II album. On September 24, 1971, Dylan re-recorded three Basement Tapes-era songs for inclusion on this compilation—"You Ain't Goin' Nowhere", "I Shall Be Released", and "Down in the Flood"—with Happy Traum playing bass, banjo, and electric guitar, as well as providing a vocal harmony. Traum notes that these songs "were very popular songs ... that [Dylan] wanted to put his own stamp on." Author John Nogowski has described the 1971 version of "You Ain't Goin' Nowhere" as having a "joyous delivery."

Heylin has concluded that Dylan took a lot more time and care over his third revision of the song's lyrics in 1971 than he had done back in 1967. The lyrics of the 1971 recording differed significantly from the Basement Tapes version, and featured what Heylin describes as "riddles, wisely expounded", such as, "Buy me some rings and a gun that sings/A flute that toots and a bee that stings/A sky that cries and a bird that flies/A fish that walks and a dog that talks." The 1971 lyrics also make mention of the film Gunga Din, while Genghis Khan (who was mentioned in the earlier version) is now accompanied by his brother Don. These revised lyrics also name-checked guitarist Roger McGuinn of the Byrds, and played upon a mistaken lyric in the Byrds' cover version of the song from three years earlier (see below).

The 1971 version of "You Ain't Goin' Nowhere" was later released on the compilations The Essential Bob Dylan (2000) and Dylan (2007), although the latter album's liner notes erroneously state that it is the 1967 version.

== Live performances ==
According to his official website, Dylan performed the song live 108 times between 1976 and 2012.

== The Byrds' version ==
"You Ain't Goin' Nowhere"
- Dutch picture sleeve

Single by the Byrds

from the album Sweetheart of the Rodeo
- B-side: "Artificial Energy"
- Released: April 2, 1968
- Recorded: March 9, 1968
- Studio: Columbia (Nashville, Tennessee)
- Genre: Country rock
- Length: 2:33
- Label: Columbia
- Songwriter: Bob Dylan
- Producer: Gary Usher

The Byrds singles chronology
"Goin' Back" (1967)	"You Ain't Goin' Nowhere" (1968)	"I Am a Pilgrim" (1968)

The Byrds' recording of "You Ain't Goin' Nowhere" was released as a single on April 2, 1968 and was the first commercial release of the song, coming three years prior to any release of it by Dylan. The Byrds' single reached number 74 on the Billboard Hot 100 chart and number 45 on the UK Singles Chart. The song was also the lead single from the band's 1968 country rock album, Sweetheart of the Rodeo. Although it is not as famous as their cover version of Dylan's "Mr. Tambourine Man", the Byrds' recording of "You Ain't Goin' Nowhere" is sometimes considered by critics to be the band's best Dylan cover. Billboard magazine described it as being "infectious rhythm material" and having a "good lyric line, well performed".

The song was selected as a suitable cover by the Byrds after their record label, Columbia Records (which was also Dylan's record label), sent them some demos from Dylan's Woodstock sessions. Included among these demos were the songs "You Ain't Goin' Nowhere" and "Nothing Was Delivered", both of which were recorded by the Byrds in March 1968, during the Nashville recording sessions for Sweetheart of the Rodeo. The Byrds' version of "You Ain't Goin' Nowhere" features musical contributions from session musician Lloyd Green on pedal steel guitar. Author Johnny Rogan has commented that despite the change in musical style that the country-influenced Sweetheart of the Rodeo album represented for the band, the inclusion of two Dylan covers forged a link with their previous folk rock incarnation, when Dylan's material had been a mainstay of their repertoire.

The Byrds' recording of "You Ain't Goin' Nowhere" caused a minor controversy between the band and its author. Dylan's original demo of the song contained the lyric "Pick up your money, pack up your tent", which was mistakenly altered in the Byrds' version, by guitarist and singer Roger McGuinn, to "Pack up your money, pick up your tent". Dylan expressed mock-annoyance at this lyric change in his 1971 recording of the song, singing "Pack up your money, put up your tent, McGuinn/You ain't goin' nowhere." McGuinn replied in 1989 on a new recording of the song included on the Nitty Gritty Dirt Band's Will the Circle Be Unbroken: Volume Two album, adding the word "Dylan" after the same "Pack up your money, pick up your tent" lyric.

Following its appearance on Sweetheart of the Rodeo, "You Ain't Goin' Nowhere" would go on to become a staple of the Byrds' live concert repertoire, until their final disbandment in 1973. The Byrds re-recorded "You Ain't Goin' Nowhere" in 1971 with Earl Scruggs, as part of the Earl Scruggs, His Family and Friends television special, and this version was included on the program's accompanying soundtrack album. The song was also performed live by a reformed line-up of the Byrds featuring Roger McGuinn, David Crosby, and Chris Hillman in January 1989. McGuinn continues to perform the song in his solo concerts and consequently it appears on his 2007 album, Live from Spain.

In addition to its appearance on the Sweetheart of the Rodeo album, the Byrds' original recording of "You Ain't Goin' Nowhere" also appears on several of the band's compilations, including The Best of The Byrds: Greatest Hits, Volume II, History of The Byrds, The Byrds Play Dylan, The Original Singles: 1967–1969, Volume 2, The Byrds, and There Is a Season. Live performances of the song are included on the expanded edition of the band's (Untitled) album and on Live at Royal Albert Hall 1971.

== Other covers ==
The British beat group Unit 4 + 2 released a recording of "You Ain't Goin' Nowhere" as a single in 1968, but it suffered poor sales as a result of the competing version released by the Byrds and consequently it did not chart. Joan Baez included a gender-switched version of the song, in which she sings "Tomorrow's the day my man's gonna come", on her 1968 album of Dylan covers, Any Day Now.

Former members of the Byrds Roger McGuinn and Chris Hillman re-recorded the song in 1989 with the Nitty Gritty Dirt Band on that band's Will the Circle Be Unbroken: Volume Two album. This recording was released as a single and peaked at number 6 on the Billboard Hot Country Singles chart and number eleven on the Canadian country music charts published by RPM. In spite of the involvement of the Nitty Gritty Dirt Band, the single release was credited to McGuinn and Hillman alone.

"You Ain't Goin' Nowhere" has also been covered by Earl Scruggs, Maria Muldaur, Old Crow Medicine Show, Phish, Counting Crows, the Dandy Warhols, Tedeschi Trucks Band, Loudon Wainwright III, Noel Gallagher, and Glen Hansard with Markéta Irglová among others.

It was one of about two dozen Dylan compositions included in the 2017 stage musical Girl from the North Country.

== Chart performance ==
=== The Byrds version ===
Chart (1968)	Peak position
Canadian RPM Top Singles	55
UK Singles Chart	45
US Billboard Hot 100	74

=== Chris Hillman/Roger McGuinn version ===
Chart (1989)	Peak position
Canada Country Singles (RPM)	11
US Hot Country Songs (Billboard)	6

==== Year-end charts ====
Chart (1989)	Position
US Country Songs (Billboard)	79
