= Jake Porter =

American jazz trumpeter (1916–1993)

Jake Vernon Haven Porter (August 3, 1916 – March 25, 1993) was an American jazz trumpeter and record producer.

Born in Oakland, California, Porter started playing violin at age seven and switched to cornet at nine. He played locally in the San Francisco Bay Area between 1931 and 1939, playing with Melvin Parks, Lionel Hampton, and Saunders King before moving to Los Angeles in 1940. There he found work playing with Cee Pee Johnson, Slam Stewart, and Slim Gaillard; he served in the military in 1942-43 playing in a band at Camp Lockett, near San Diego. After his discharge he played with Benny Carter, Fats Waller, Noble Sissle, Fletcher Henderson, Lionel Hampton (1945–46), Horace Henderson, Benny Goodman (briefly in 1947), and Mel Powell (1947). He led his own band at the Down Beat Room Cafe in Los Angeles from late 1947, and also led an all-female ensemble which toured the American South in 1949. He held a residency at the Norbo Grill in 1950.

In 1951, Porter founded the label Combo Records, which was active until 1961 and released R&B and doo wop releases in addition to some jazz. Much of the material released on the label was recorded in Porter's basement, and he did a fair bit of songwriting for the releases in addition to recording duties. He did further touring as a bandleader in the 1950s, and freelanced in California in the 1960s. He and Mike Porter collaborated in Canada in 1964. He played less later in his life and concentrated on the business aspects of music, working for musicians' unions in the 1970s. However, he toured Europe in 1978 and still played in the 1980s. He died in Los Angeles at age 76.

== Discography ==
=== As sideman ===
With B.B. King

- 1956: Singin' the Blues (Crown)
