= The Byrds discography =

Cataloging of published recordings by The Byrds

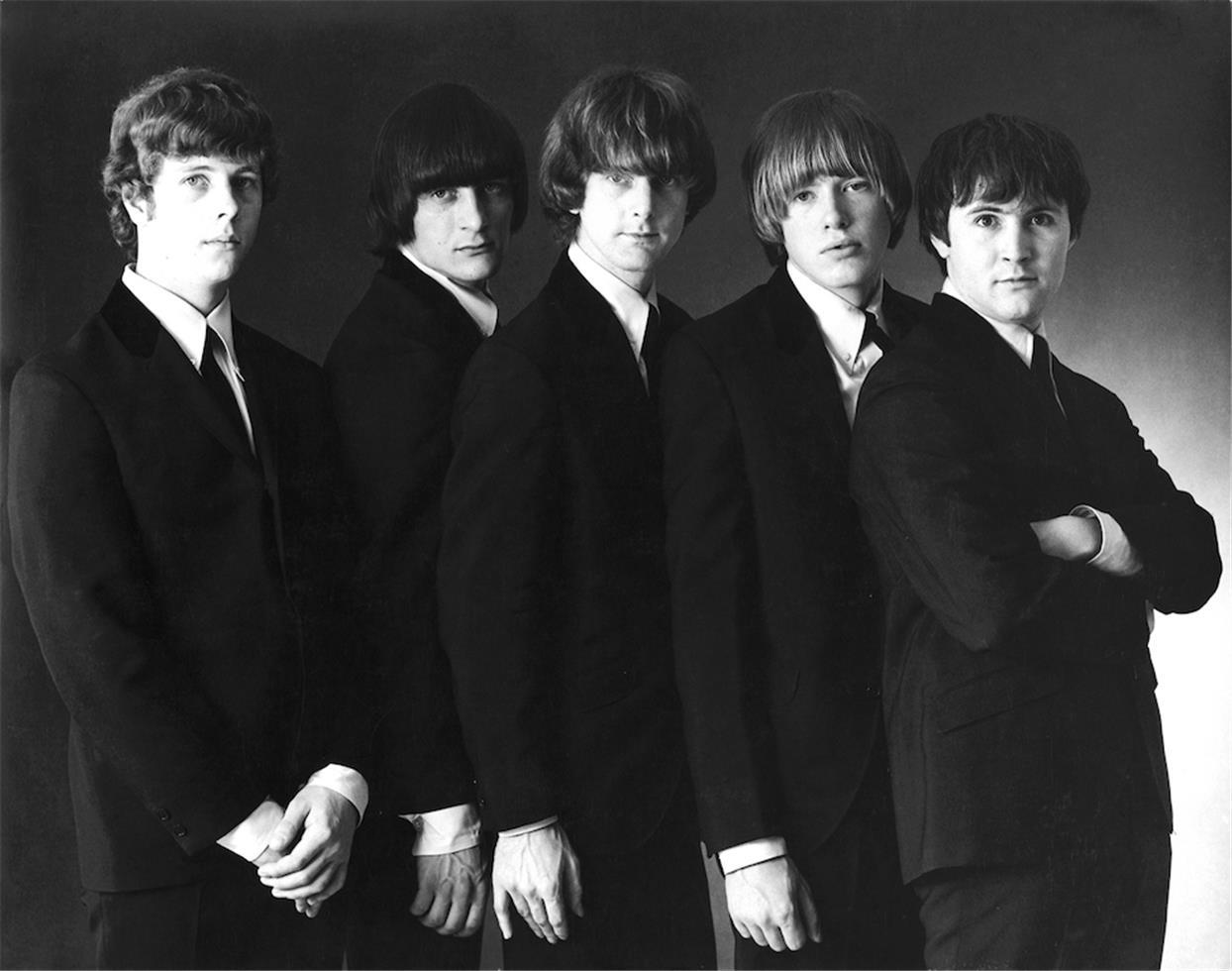
- The Byrds in 1965
- Studio albums: 12
- Extended plays: 6
- Live albums: 3
- Compilation albums: 47
- Singles: 29

The Byrds were an American rock band formed in Los Angeles, California in 1964. The bulk of the band's releases were issued on Columbia Records or its subsidiaries, except their final studio album, Byrds, and its associated singles, which Asylum Records released in 1973. Before signing a recording contract with Columbia, the band released a single with Elektra Records in 1964 under the name the Beefeaters.

The Byrds' discography was originally released on the vinyl format, as full-length LPs, shorter EPs, and singles. Since the 1960s, the band's back catalogue has also been released on reel-to-reel tape, audio cassette, 8-track tape, CD, MiniDisc, digital downloads, and, most recently, as streaming media. Between 1965 and 1968, the Byrds' albums were released in both mono and stereo variations, with Sweetheart of the Rodeo being the first album to be released exclusively in stereo in the US (Sweetheart of the Rodeo and its follow-up Dr. Byrds & Mr. Hyde were both issued in mono and stereo formats in the UK).

This article lists all of the Byrds' official studio albums, live albums, compilations, EPs, and singles. Unofficial, "bootleg" releases are not included.

== Studio albums ==
Title	Album details (Note: US and UK release information is per Christopher Hjort's book, So You Want to Be a Rock 'n' Roll Star.)		Peak chart positions				
Title	US release	UK release	US	CAN	GER	NLD	UK
Mr. Tambourine Man	Released: June 21, 1965; Label: Columbia	Released: August 20, 1965; Label: CBS	6	—	35	—	7
Turn! Turn! Turn!	Released: December 6, 1965; Label: Columbia	Released: March 22, 1966; Label: CBS	17	—	—	—	11
Fifth Dimension	Released: July 18, 1966; Label: Columbia	Released: September 22, 1966; Label: CBS	24	—	—	—	27
Younger Than Yesterday	Released: February 6, 1967; Label: Columbia	Released: April 7, 1967; Label: CBS	24	5	—	—	37
The Notorious Byrd Brothers	Released: January 15, 1968; Label: Columbia	Released: April 12, 1968; Label: CBS	47	—	—	—	12
Sweetheart of the Rodeo	Released: August 30, 1968; Label: Columbia	Released: September 27, 1968; Label: CBS	77	—	—	—	—
Dr. Byrds & Mr. Hyde	Released: March 5, 1969; Label: Columbia	Released: April 25, 1969; Label: CBS	153	—	—	6	15
Ballad of Easy Rider	Released: November 10, 1969; Label: Columbia	Released: January 16, 1970; Label: CBS	36	40	—	—	41
(Untitled)	Released: September 14, 1970; Label: Columbia	Released: November 13, 1970; Label: CBS	40	15	—	3	11
Byrdmaniax	Released: June 23, 1971; Label: Columbia	Released: August 6, 1971; Label: CBS	46	23	—	1	—
Farther Along	Released: November 17, 1971; Label: Columbia	Released: January 21, 1972; Label: CBS	152	41	—	—	—
Byrds	Released: March 7, 1973; Label: Asylum	Released: March 24, 1973; Label: Asylum	20	19	—	6	31
"—" denotes a recording that did not chart or was not released in that territory.

== Live albums ==
Title	Album details	Peak chart positions			
Title	Album details	US	CAN	NLD	UK
(Untitled) (sides 1 and 2 only)	Released: September 14, 1970; Label: Columbia; Format: LP, reel-to-reel, 8-track tape, cassette	40	15	3	11
Live at the Fillmore – February 1969	Released: February 22, 2000; Label: Columbia/Legacy; Format: CD	—	—	—	—
Live at Royal Albert Hall 1971	Released: June 17, 2008; Label: Sundazed; Format: CD, LP	—	—	—	—
The Lost Broadcasts	Released: June 28, 2011; Label: Gonzo; Format: CD, DVD	—	—	—	—
"—" denotes a recording that did not chart or was not released in that territory.

== Compilation albums ==
There have been many official compilation albums by the Byrds released since 1967, with the majority of these collections consisting of material recorded between 1965 and 1971, a period when the band were with Columbia Records. In addition, four compilations of material recorded before the group secured a recording contract with Columbia have been released under the titles Preflyte, In the Beginning, The Preflyte Sessions and Preflyte Plus. Two compilations of rare and previously unissued material have also been released as Never Before and Another Dimension. There have so far been two Byrds' box sets issued: The Byrds (October 1990) and There Is a Season (September 2006). Also, excerpts from the band's performance at the Monterey Pop Festival have been released on The Monterey International Pop Festival CD box set and among the extras on the Monterey Pop DVD.

- NOTE: The four compilation albums with the title The Very Best of The Byrds (released in 1983, 1997, 2006, and 2008) are not the same and each features a different track listing.
- NOTE: The three compilations titled The Byrds Play Dylan or The Byrds Play the Songs of Bob Dylan (released in 1979, 2001, and 2002) are not the same and each features a different track listing.

Title	Released	Peak chart positions			Certifications
Title	Released	US	NLD	UK	Certifications
The Byrds' Greatest Hits	August 7, 1967	6	—	—	RIAA: Platinum
Preflyte	July 29, 1969	84	—	—	
The Byrds' Greatest Hits Volume II	October 29, 1971	—	1	—	
The Best of The Byrds: Greatest Hits, Volume II	November 10, 1972	114	—	—	
History of The Byrds	May 18, 1973	—	—	47	
Return of The Byrds	May 7, 1976	—	—	—	
The Byrds	December 1978	—	—	—	
20 Golden Hits	July 1979	—	20	—	
The Byrds Play Dylan	November 1979	—	—	—	
The Original Singles: 1965–1967, Volume 1	August 8, 1980	—	—	—	
The Original Singles: 1967–1969, Volume 2	February 1982	—	—	—	
The Very Best of The Byrds	November 1983	—	—	—	
The Byrds Collection	September 1986	—	—	—	BPI: Silver
Never Before	December 1, 1987	—	—	—	
In the Beginning	August 1988	—	—	—	
The Byrds	October 19, 1990	151	—	—	
Full Flyte 1965-1970	February 1991	—	—	—	
Greatest Hits - 18 Classics Remastered	1991	—	26	—	
Free Flyte	1991	—	—	—	
20 Essential Tracks From The Boxed Set: 1965-1990	January 14, 1992	—	—	—	
Definitive Collection	1995	—	—	—	
Nashville West	May 1996	—	—	—	
The Very Best of The Byrds	June 23, 1997	—	—	—	BPI: Gold
Super Hits	July 21, 1998	—	—	—	
Byrd Parts	September 15, 1998	—	—	—	
Sanctuary	July 18, 2000	—	—	—	
Sanctuary II	December 19, 2000	—	—	—	
The Byrds Play the Songs of Bob Dylan	May 28, 2001	—	—	—	
The Preflyte Sessions	November 2001	—	—	—	
Sanctuary III	December 11, 2001	—	—	—	
Sanctuary IV	May 21, 2002	—	—	—	
The Byrds Play Dylan	June 11, 2002	—	—	—	
The Columbia Singles '65-'67	November 1, 2002	—	—	—	
The Essential Byrds	April 22, 2003	—	—	—	
Byrd Parts 2	May 2003	—	—	—	
Mojo Presents...An Introduction to The Byrds	September 22, 2003	—	—	—	
Cancelled Flytes	September 2004	—	—	—	
Another Dimension	April 26, 2005	—	—	—	
America's Great National Treasure	January 31, 2006	—	—	—	
The Very Best of The Byrds	June 2006	—	—	82	
There Is a Season	September 26, 2006	—	—	—	
A Collection	July 9, 2007	—	—	—	
Playlist: The Very Best of The Byrds	October 21, 2008	—	—	—	
Greatest Hits	March 16, 2009	—	—	—	
Eight Miles High: The Best of The Byrds	January 25, 2010	—	—	—	
The Complete Album Collection	November 14, 2011	—	—	—	
Setlist: The Very Best of the Byrds Live	December 27, 2011	—	—	—	
Preflyte Plus	February 27, 2012	—	—	—	
Original Singles A's & B's 1965-1971	May 30, 2012	—	—	—	
The 60s: The Byrds	September 9, 2014	—	—	—	
Turn! Turn! Turn!: The Ultimate Collection	October 16, 2015	—	—	—	
"—" denotes a recording that did not chart or was not released in that territory.

== Extended plays ==
CBS Records released two Byrds EPs in the UK during 1966, featuring tracks taken from the band's first three albums. Then, in 1971, Columbia Records and Scholastic Books released an EP in the United States to tie-in with the publication of Bud Scoppa's biography of the Byrds. A further three EPs were released in the UK between 1983 and 1990 on various record labels.

Title	Released
The Times They Are a-Changin'	February 1966
Eight Miles High	October 1966
The Byrds	1971
The Byrds	September 1983
Solid Gold	May 1989
Four Dimensions	December 1990

== Singles ==
Title	Date (Note: US and UK release information is per Christopher Hjort's 2008 book, So You Want to Be a Rock 'n' Roll Star, except where noted.)		Peak chart positions								Certifications	Album
Title	US release	UK release	US	AUS	AUT	CAN	GER	NLD	NZ	UK	Certifications	Album
"Please Let Me Love You" (Note: Released under the pseudonym the Beefeaters.) / "Don't Be Long"	October 7, 1964	January 1965	—	—	—	—	—	—	—	—		non-album single
"Mr. Tambourine Man" / "I Knew I'd Want You"	April 12, 1965	May 15, 1965	1	3	3	2	2	3	1	1	BPI: Silver	Mr. Tambourine Man
"All I Really Want to Do" / "I'll Feel a Whole Lot Better"	June 14, 1965	August 6, 1965	40; 103 (Note: "I'll Feel a Whole Lot Better" peaked at number 103 on Billboard's Bubbling Under the Hot 100 chart.)	42	—	11 (Note: RPM magazine listed the Byrds' version of "All I Really Want to Do" at number 11 on August 9, 1965. In the following week's issue, the Byrds and Cher's versions were listed jointly at number 11.)	27	—	8	4		Mr. Tambourine Man
"Turn! Turn! Turn!" / "She Don't Care About Time"	October 1, 1965	October 29, 1965	1	34	—	3	8	15	1	26		Turn! Turn! Turn!
"Set You Free This Time" / "It Won't Be Wrong"	January 10, 1966 (Note: The single's release may have been delayed by a week. Soon after its release, Columbia began promoting "It Won't Be Wrong" as the A-side.)	February 11, 1966 (Note: A week later, on February 18, CBS began promoting "It Won't Be Wrong" as the A-side.)	79; 63	—; 78	—	—; 20	—	—	14	—		Turn! Turn! Turn!
"Eight Miles High" / "Why"	March 14, 1966	May 29, 1966	14	99	—	9	—	—	16	24		Fifth Dimension
"5D (Fifth Dimension)" / "Captain Soul"	June 13, 1966	June 29, 1966	44	—	—	44	—	—	—	—		Fifth Dimension
"Mr. Spaceman" / "What's Happening?!?!"	September 6, 1966	October 14, 1966	36	—	—	29	—	18	—	—		Fifth Dimension
"So You Want to Be a Rock 'n' Roll Star" / "Everybody's Been Burned"	January 9, 1967	February 17, 1967	29	—	—	—	—	—	—	—		Younger Than Yesterday
"My Back Pages" / "Renaissance Fair"	March 13, 1967	May 23, 1967	30	—	—	—	—	18	16	—		Younger Than Yesterday
"Have You Seen Her Face" / "Don't Make Waves"	May 22, 1967	—	74	—	—	—	—	—	—	—		Younger Than Yesterday
"Lady Friend" / "Old John Robertson"	July 13, 1967	September 1, 1967 (Note: In the UK, the single was instead backed with "Don't Make Waves".)	82	—	—	—	—	—	—	—		non-album single
"Goin' Back" / "Change Is Now"	October 20, 1967	December 29, 1967	89	—	—	—	—	—	—	—		The Notorious Byrd Brothers
"You Ain't Goin' Nowhere" / "Artificial Energy"	April 2, 1968	May 3, 1968	74	82	—	55	—	—	—	45		Sweetheart of the Rodeo
"I Am a Pilgrim" / "Pretty Boy Floyd"	September 2, 1968	October 11, 1968	—	—	—	—	—	—	—	—		Sweetheart of the Rodeo
"Bad Night at the Whiskey" / "Drug Store Truck Drivin' Man"	January 7, 1969	March 7, 1969	—	—	—	—	—	—	—	—		Dr. Byrds & Mr. Hyde
"Lay Lady Lay" / "Old Blue"	May 2, 1969	June 6, 1969	132 (Note: "Lay Lady Lay" peaked at number 132 on Billboard's Bubbling Under the Hot 100 chart.)	—	—	—	—	—	—	—		non-album single
"Wasn't Born to Follow" / "Child of the Universe"	—	September 26, 1969	—	—	—	—	—	—	10	—		The Notorious Byrd Brothers
"Ballad of Easy Rider" / "Oil in My Lamp"	October 1, 1969	—	65	—	—	68	—	—	—	—		Ballad of Easy Rider
"Jesus Is Just Alright" / "It's All Over Now, Baby Blue"	December 15, 1969	February 20, 1970	97	—	—	—	—	13	—	—		Ballad of Easy Rider
"Chestnut Mare" / "Just a Season"	October 23, 1970	January 1, 1971	121 (Note: "Chestnut Mare" peaked at number 121 on Billboard's Bubbling Under the Hot 100 chart.)	—	—	77	—	13	—	19		(Untitled)
"I Trust (Everything Is Gonna Work Out Alright)" / "(Is This) My Destiny"	—	May 7, 1971	—	—	—	—	—	17	—	—		Byrdmaniax
"Glory, Glory" / "Citizen Kane"	August 20, 1971	October 1, 1971	110 (Note: "Glory, Glory" peaked at number 110 on Billboard's Bubbling Under the Hot 100 chart.)	—	—	55	—	—	—	—		Byrdmaniax
"America's Great National Pastime" / "Farther Along"	November 29, 1971	January 1972 (Note: Hjort writes that the single was possibly withdrawn before being released in the U.K., but its European release went ahead in West Germany and the Netherlands.)	—	—	—	—	—	—	—	—		Farther Along
"Full Circle" / "Long Live the King"	April 11, 1973 (Note: "Full Circle" was released in the UK with "Things Will Be Better" as its B-side on August 8, 1975.)	June 22, 1973	109 (Note: "Full Circle" peaked at number 109 on Billboard's Bubbling Under the Hot 100 chart.)	—	—	—	—	—	—	—		Byrds
"Things Will Be Better" / "For Free"	—	April 24, 1973	—	—	—	—	—	—	—	—		Byrds
"Cowgirl in the Sand" / "Long Live the King"	June 1973	—	—	—	—	62	—	—	—	—		Byrds
"—" denotes a recording that did not chart or was not released in that territory.
