= History of The Byrds =

Greatest hits album by the Byrds
- Released: May 18, 1973
- Recorded: January 20, 1965 – July 27, 1971
- Genre: Rock; pop; folk rock; psychedelic rock; country rock
- Length: 80:24
- Label: CBS
- Producer: Terry Melcher, Allen Stanton, Gary Usher, Bob Johnston, Jim Dickson, Chris Hinshaw, the Byrds

The Byrds chronology
Byrds (1973)	History of The Byrds (1973)	Return of The Byrds (1976)

History of The Byrds is a double album compilation by the American rock band the Byrds and was released on May 18, 1973 by CBS Records. The compilation was released exclusively in Europe, peaking at number 47 on the UK Albums Chart, but it was also available in the United States as an import.

== Contents ==
History of The Byrds provides a chronological survey of the band's career from 1965 to 1971, a period when they were signed to Columbia Records. It begins with the Byrds' debut single on Columbia, "Mr. Tambourine Man", and culminates with their final single release for the label, "America's Great National Pastime". The album features the first appearance on an LP of the non-album single "Lady Friend" and the 1965 B-side "She Don't Care About Time".

It was issued to coincide with the reunion of the original members of the Byrds and the release of a reunion album, titled Byrds, in March 1973. However, none of the tracks from the 1973 reunion album were included on History of The Byrds, due to that album having appeared on Asylum Records rather than on Columbia.

At the time of its release, History of The Byrds was the most comprehensive overview of the band's recorded output available. Every variation of the Byrds' ever changing lineup is represented within the album's song selection and, as such, it provides a survey of the band's musical journey from their days as folk rock and psychedelic rock pioneers through to their later exploration of country rock. Many of the band's biggest selling singles are included, along with a number of their best known album tracks. Consequently, the album includes musical contributions from all of the key players in the Byrds' convoluted history, including Gene Clark, David Crosby, Chris Hillman, Michael Clarke, Gram Parsons, Clarence White, and the group's only consistent member, Roger McGuinn.

The album's front cover made use of a David Gahr photograph featuring the last lineup of the Byrds to be represented on the album: Roger McGuinn, Skip Battin, Gene Parsons, and Clarence White. The same photograph had already been used for the cover of the U.S. compilation album The Best of The Byrds: Greatest Hits, Volume II just six months earlier. It is likely that CBS in the UK didn't have access to the original photograph because the cover of History of The Byrds features the same track listing as Greatest Hits, Volume II, with three amendments added in a noticeably smaller font over black bars that cover track names from the earlier compilation. The back cover of History of The Byrds included liner notes by Kim Fowley and the inside gatefold sleeve of the double vinyl LP featured Pete Frame's "Byrds Family Tree". This intricately detailed flowchart traced the group's roots and complicated membership history over the years. The very first pressing of this double LP mentioned the Byrds English fan club's (run by Chrissie Oakes) name and address in the middle of the family tree.

Despite being one of the band's biggest selling compilations in Europe, History of The Byrds went out of print in the early 1990s and has never been released on CD.

== Track listing ==
=== Side 1 ===
No.	Title	Writer(s)	Original Release	Length
1.	"Mr. Tambourine Man"	Bob Dylan	Mr. Tambourine Man, 1965	2:20
2.	"Turn! Turn! Turn!"	Book of Ecclesiastes/Pete Seeger	Turn! Turn! Turn!, 1965	3:49
3.	"She Don't Care About Time"	Gene Clark	B-side of "Turn! Turn! Turn!", 1965	2:28
4.	"Wild Mountain Thyme"	traditional, arranged Roger McGuinn, Chris Hillman, Michael Clarke, David Crosby	Fifth Dimension, 1966	2:29
5.	"Eight Miles High"	Gene Clark, Roger McGuinn, David Crosby	Fifth Dimension, 1966	3:35
6.	"Mr. Spaceman"	Roger McGuinn	Fifth Dimension, 1966	2:08
7.	"5D (Fifth Dimension)"	Roger McGuinn	Fifth Dimension, 1966	2:32

=== Side 2 ===
No.	Title	Writer(s)	Original Release	Length
1.	"So You Want to Be a Rock 'n' Roll Star"	Chris Hillman, Roger McGuinn	Younger Than Yesterday, 1967	2:03
2.	"Time Between"	Chris Hillman	Younger Than Yesterday, 1967	1:56
3.	"My Back Pages"	Bob Dylan	Younger Than Yesterday, 1967	3:05
4.	"Lady Friend"	David Crosby	non-album single, 1967	2:30
5.	"Goin' Back"	Carole King, Gerry Goffin	The Notorious Byrd Brothers, 1968	3:26
6.	"Old John Robertson"	Chris Hillman, Roger McGuinn	The Notorious Byrd Brothers, 1968	1:51
7.	"Wasn't Born to Follow"	Carole King, Gerry Goffin	The Notorious Byrd Brothers, 1968	2:02

=== Side 3 ===
No.	Title	Writer(s)	Original Release	Length
1.	"You Ain't Goin' Nowhere"	Bob Dylan	Sweetheart of the Rodeo, 1968	2:33
2.	"Hickory Wind"	Gram Parsons, Bob Buchanan	Sweetheart of the Rodeo, 1968	3:30
3.	"Nashville West"	Gene Parsons, Clarence White	Dr. Byrds & Mr. Hyde, 1969	2:30
4.	"Drug Store Truck Drivin' Man"	Roger McGuinn, Gram Parsons	Dr. Byrds & Mr. Hyde, 1969	3:52
5.	"Gunga Din"	Gene Parsons	Ballad of Easy Rider, 1969	3:01
6.	"Jesus Is Just Alright"	Arthur Reid Reynolds	Ballad of Easy Rider, 1969	2:09
7.	"Ballad of Easy Rider"	Roger McGuinn, Bob Dylan	Ballad of Easy Rider, 1969	2:01

- NOTE: Bob Dylan is not officially credited as a songwriter on "Ballad of Easy Rider".

=== Side 4 ===
No.	Title	Writer(s)	Original Release	Length
1.	"Chestnut Mare"	Roger McGuinn, Jacques Levy	(Untitled), 1970	5:10
2.	"Yesterday's Train"	Gene Parsons, Skip Battin	(Untitled), 1970	3:32
3.	"Just a Season"	Roger McGuinn, Jacques Levy	(Untitled), 1970	3:52
4.	"Citizen Kane"	Skip Battin, Kim Fowley	Byrdmaniax, 1971	2:35
5.	"Jamaica (Say You Will)"	Jackson Browne	Byrdmaniax, 1971	3:25
6.	"Tiffany Queen"	Roger McGuinn	Farther Along, 1971	2:40
7.	"America's Great National Pastime"	Skip Battin, Kim Fowley	Farther Along, 1971	2:56

== Personnel ==
The Byrds

- Roger McGuinn - guitar, banjo, vocals
- Gene Clark - tambourine, vocals
- David Crosby - guitar, vocals (electric bass on "Old John Robertson")
- Chris Hillman - electric bass, guitar, vocals
- Michael Clarke - drums
- Gram Parsons - acoustic guitar, piano, organ, vocals
- Kevin Kelley - drums
- Clarence White - lead guitar, vocals
- John York - electric bass, backing vocals
- Gene Parsons - drums, acoustic guitar, harmonica, vocals
- Skip Battin - electric bass, piano, vocals

Additional personnel

- Jerry Cole - rhythm guitar (on "Mr. Tambourine Man")
- Larry Knechtel - electric bass (on "Mr. Tambourine Man" and "Citizen Kane")
- Hal Blaine - drums (on "Mr. Tambourine Man")
- Leon Russell - electric piano (on "Mr. Tambourine Man")
- Van Dyke Parks - organ (on "5D (Fifth Dimension)")
- Hugh Masekela - trumpet (on "So You Want to Be a Rock 'n' Roll Star" and "Lady Friend")
- Vern Gosdin – acoustic guitar (on "Time Between")
- Jim Gordon - drums (on "Goin' Back")
- Red Rhodes - pedal steel guitar (on "Goin' Back" and "Wasn't Born to Follow")
- Paul Beaver - Moog synthesizer (on "Goin' Back")
- Dennis McCarthy - celeste (on "Goin' Back")
- James Burton - guitar (on "Goin' Back")
- Terry Trotter - piano (on "Goin' Back")
- Lester Harris - cello (on "Goin' Back")
- Victor Sazer, Carl West - violin (on "Goin' Back")
- Ann Stockton - harp (on "Goin' Back")
- Dennis Faust - percussion (on "Goin' Back")
- Lloyd Green - pedal steel guitar (on "You Ain't Goin' Nowhere", "Hickory Wind" and "Drug Store Truck Drivin' Man")
- John Hartford - fiddle (on "Hickory Wind")
- Glen D. Hardin - organ (on "Gunga Din")
- Sneaky Pete Kleinow - pedal steel guitar (on "Yesterday's Train")
- Jimmi Seiter - percussion (on "Citizen Kane")
