= The Best of The Byrds: Greatest Hits, Volume II =

Greatest hits album by the Byrds
- Released: November 10, 1972
- Recorded: November 1, 1965, November 29, 1967 – August 27, 1971
- Genre: Rock; folk rock; country rock
- Length: 31:11
- Label: Columbia
- Producer: Terry Melcher, Gary Usher, Bob Johnston, The Byrds

The Byrds chronology
Farther Along (1971)	The Best of The Byrds: Greatest Hits, Volume II (1972)	Byrds (1973)

The Best of The Byrds: Greatest Hits, Volume II is the third greatest hits album by the American rock band the Byrds, but only the second to be released in the United States, since the earlier The Byrds' Greatest Hits Volume II had only been issued in the UK. The album was released in the U.S. by Columbia Records on November 10, 1972 (see 1972 in music) in lieu of any new Byrds' product during that year. It spent a total of thirteen weeks on the Billboard Top LPs & Tape chart and peaked at number 114.

== Contents ==
The Best of The Byrds: Greatest Hits, Volume II was released just prior to the highly publicized reunion of the five original members of the Byrds. The album was compiled with input from the band's guitarist and leader Roger McGuinn, although rock historian Christopher Hjort has suggested that it offered a somewhat erratic survey of the band's later years.

The bulk of the album's songs are drawn from the years 1969 through to 1971, with the 1968 albums The Notorious Byrd Brothers and Sweetheart of the Rodeo only being represented by "Wasn't Born to Follow" and "You Ain't Goin' Nowhere" respectively. The album also included "He Was a Friend of Mine", which had originally appeared on 1965's Turn! Turn! Turn! album, a period already covered by the band's first compilation album, The Byrds' Greatest Hits. The album featured a number of the band's U.S. charting singles, including "Ballad of Easy Rider" (number 65), "Jesus Is Just Alright" (number 97), "Chestnut Mare" (number 121), and "You Ain't Goin' Nowhere" (number 74). However, since none of these singles reached the U.S. Top 40, they couldn't really be considered bona fide hits.

The Best of The Byrds: Greatest Hits, Volume II was re-issued on CD in 1990, but is currently out of print. The album's cover photograph was later reused for a UK double album compilation named History of The Byrds.

== Critical reception ==
Professional ratings
Review scores
Source	Rating
Christgau's Record Guide	B

Press reaction to the compilation was largely lukewarm, with Bud Scoppa, writing for Rolling Stone magazine, criticizing the album's song selection: "If you were asked to put together an anthology album of one of the longest-lived, most productive rock groups ever, and you had the total output of the group to choose from, I'll bet you wouldn't come up with anything remotely resembling this album. It's not that the obvious selections aren't included, it's that so little else is." Music critic Stephen Thomas Erlewine described the album in his review for the Allmusic website as "not a bad sampling of the Byrds' final years, but Sweetheart of the Rodeo itself offers a better summation of the musical direction the Byrds took after 1967."

== Track listing ==
=== Side 1 ===
1. "Ballad of Easy Rider" (Roger McGuinn, Bob Dylan) – 2:03
  - NOTE: Bob Dylan is not officially credited as a songwriter on "Ballad of Easy Rider".
2. "Wasn't Born to Follow" (Gerry Goffin, Carole King) – 2:00
3. "Jesus Is Just Alright" (Arthur Reynolds) – 2:09
4. "He Was a Friend of Mine" (traditional, new words and arrangement Roger McGuinn) – 2:32
5. "Chestnut Mare" (Roger McGuinn, Jacques Levy) – 5:09

=== Side 2 ===
1. "Tiffany Queen" (Roger McGuinn) – 2:42
2. "Drug Store Truck Drivin' Man" (Roger McGuinn, Gram Parsons) – 3:52
3. "You Ain't Goin' Nowhere" (Bob Dylan) – 2:35
4. "Citizen Kane" (Skip Battin, Kim Fowley) – 2:33
5. "I Wanna Grow Up to Be a Politician" (Roger McGuinn, Jacques Levy) – 2:03
6. "America's Great National Pastime" (Skip Battin, Kim Fowley) – 3:00
