= The Byrds' Greatest Hits Volume II =

Greatest hits album by the Byrds
- Released: May 15, 1971 (Netherlands); October 29, 1971
- Recorded: September 1, October 27, 1965, October 9, 1967 – October 6, 1970
- Genre: Rock; folk rock; country rock
- Length: 36:30
- Label: CBS
- Producer: Terry Melcher, Gary Usher, Bob Johnston

The Byrds chronology
Byrdmaniax (1971)	The Byrds' Greatest Hits Volume II (1971)	Farther Along (1971)

The Byrds' Greatest Hits Volume II is the second greatest hits album by the American rock band the Byrds. It was released in the United Kingdom and Europe on October 29, 1971, by CBS Records as a follow-up to the band's first compilation album, The Byrds' Greatest Hits. The album appeared following the band's successful appearance at the Lincoln Folk Festival in England on July 24, 1971, and according to band biographer Johnny Rogan may have been issued by CBS as a reaction to the band's previous studio album, Byrdmaniax, having failed to chart in the UK.

The album gathered together many of the singles that the Byrds had issued in the UK since the release of their first compilation in 1967, and as a result, it is the first album to feature the band's recording of Bob Dylan's "Lay Lady Lay", which had been issued as a non-album single in May 1969. Most of the tracks on the album were originally released between 1968 and 1971, but the song "The Times They Are a-Changin'" dated from 1965, despite that era of the band's career having already been covered by the Byrds' first greatest hits album.

The Byrds' Greatest Hits Volume II failed to reach the UK Albums Chart, but it peaked at number 1 in the Netherlands. The album's critical reception was generally warm, with the NME describing the compilation as, "an indispensable acquisition for any student of the cream of American rock, particularly of the roots and influences". Nonetheless, a number of contemporary reviews also made note of the album's inaccurate and misleading title, since among the twelve tracks included, only the song "Chestnut Mare" had been a genuine hit.

The album has never been re-issued on CD and is currently out of print.

== Track listing ==
=== Side 1 ===
1. "Ballad of Easy Rider" (Roger McGuinn, Bob Dylan) – 2:03
  - NOTE: Bob Dylan is not officially credited as a songwriter on "Ballad of Easy Rider".
2. "Jesus Is Just Alright" (Arthur Reynolds) – 2:09
3. "Chestnut Mare" (Roger McGuinn, Jacques Levy) – 5:09
4. "You Ain't Goin' Nowhere" (Bob Dylan) – 2:35
5. "I Am a Pilgrim" (traditional, arranged Roger McGuinn, Chris Hillman) – 3:42
6. "Goin' Back" (Gerry Goffin, Carole King) – 3:26

=== Side 2 ===
1. "I Trust (Everything Is Gonna Work Out Alright)" (Roger McGuinn) – 3:19
2. "Lay Lady Lay" (Bob Dylan) – 3:17
3. "Drug Store Truck Drivin' Man" (Roger McGuinn, Gram Parsons) – 3:52
4. "Wasn't Born to Follow" (Gerry Goffin, Carole King) – 2:00
5. "The Times They Are a-Changin'" (Bob Dylan) – 2:18
6. "Get to You" (Gene Clark, Roger McGuinn) – 2:39
  - NOTE: The album erroneously credits "Get to You" to Chris Hillman and Roger McGuinn.
