= Live at Royal Albert Hall 1971 =

Live album by the Byrds
- Released: July 17, 2008
- Recorded: May 13, 1971
- Genre: Folk rock, country rock, bluegrass, psychedelic rock
- Label: Sundazed

The Byrds chronology
| A Collection (2007) | Live at Royal Albert Hall 1971 (2008) | Playlist: The Very Best of The Byrds (2008) |

Professional ratings
Review scores
| Source | Rating |
|---|---|
| AllMusic | 4/5 stars |
| Pitchfork | 5.2/10 |
| Uncut | 2/5 stars |

Live at Royal Albert Hall is a live album by the American rock band the Byrds, released in 2008 on Sundazed Music. The album consists of recordings from the band's appearance at the Royal Albert Hall in London, England on May 13, 1971. Although the tapes had been in lead guitarist Roger McGuinn's possession since the concert took place, the album represents the first official release of all tracks. In addition to the regular CD release, Live at Royal Albert Hall 1971 was also released as a double album vinyl LP.

== Track listing ==
1. "Lover of the Bayou" (Roger McGuinn, Jacques Levy)
2. "You Ain't Goin' Nowhere" (Bob Dylan)
3. "Truck Stop Girl" (Lowell George, Bill Payne)
4. "My Back Pages" (Bob Dylan)
5. "Baby What You Want Me to Do" (Jimmy Reed)
6. "Jamaica Say You Will" (Jackson Browne)
7. "Black Mountain Rag"/"Soldier's Joy" (traditional, arranged Clarence White, Roger McGuinn)
8. "Mr. Tambourine Man" (Bob Dylan)
9. "Pretty Boy Floyd" (Woody Guthrie)
10. "Take a Whiff (On Me)" (Huddie Ledbetter, John Lomax, Alan Lomax)
11. "Chestnut Mare" (Roger McGuinn, Jacques Levy)
12. "Jesus Is Just Alright" (Arthur Reynolds)
13. "Eight Miles High" (Gene Clark, Roger McGuinn, David Crosby)
14. "So You Want to Be a Rock 'n' Roll Star" (Roger McGuinn, Chris Hillman )
15. "Mr. Spaceman" (Roger McGuinn)
16. "I Trust" (Roger McGuinn)
17. "Nashville West" (Gene Parsons, Clarence White)
18. "Roll Over Beethoven" (Chuck Berry)
19. "Amazing Grace" (traditional, arranged Roger McGuinn, Clarence White, Gene Parsons, Skip Battin)

== Personnel ==
The Byrds

- Roger McGuinn - guitar, vocals
- Clarence White - guitar, vocals
- Skip Battin - electric bass, vocals
- Gene Parsons - drums, banjo, harmonica, vocals

Additional personnel

- Jimmi Seiter - percussion
