= Farther Along (The Byrds album) =

Studio album by the Byrds
- Released: November 17, 1971
- Recorded: July 22–28, 1971; August 1971
- Studios: CBS, London; Columbia, Hollywood
- Genres: Rock; country rock
- Length: 32:02
- Label: Columbia
- Producer: The Byrds

The Byrds chronology
The Byrds' Greatest Hits Volume II (1971)	Farther Along (1971)	The Best of The Byrds: Greatest Hits, Volume II (1972)

Singles from Farther Along
- 1. "America's Great National Pastime" Released: November 29, 1971

Farther Along is the eleventh album by the American rock band the Byrds and was released in November 1971 on Columbia Records. For the most part, the album was recorded and produced by the Byrds themselves in London, England, over the course of five work-intensive days in July 1971. It was quickly released as a reaction to the commercial failure of the Byrds' previous album, Byrdmaniax, and as an attempt to stem the criticism that album was receiving in the music press.

Byrdmaniax had featured a large amount of orchestration, which producer Terry Melcher had applied to the album, allegedly without the band's consent. The band were unhappy with this and Farther Along was intended as their answer to what they perceived as Melcher's over-production, as well as an attempt to prove that they themselves could produce an album that they regarded as superior to Byrdmaniax. Band biographer Johnny Rogan has suggested that the rapidity with which the Byrds planned and recorded Farther Along resulted in an LP that the band themselves were unhappy with and that failed to undo the damage to their reputation inflicted by Byrdmaniax.

Upon release, the album only managed to reach number 152 on the Billboard Top LPs chart and failed to break into the UK Albums Chart altogether. A single taken from the album, "America's Great National Pastime", was released on November 29, 1971, but failed to chart in the United States or in the United Kingdom. Farther Along has the dubious honor of tying with Dr. Byrds & Mr. Hyde as the Byrds' album to have spent the least time on the Billboard album chart. In addition, it was almost the lowest charting album of The Byrds' career in America, being beaten only by Dr. Byrds & Mr. Hyde, which charted at number 153.

== Overview ==
Following the release of the Byrdmaniax album, the Byrds' producer and manager, Terry Melcher, resigned amid accusations of overdubbing strings, horns, and a gospel choir onto that album without the band's consent. The Byrds' annoyance over Melcher's additions to Byrdmaniax prompted them to try to rectify the situation by quickly recording a new album, this time produced by themselves. Despite a heavy touring schedule—resulting from the band being an in-demand fixture on the live concert circuit—the Byrds were eager to release another studio album as soon as possible.

Upon arriving in England for an appearance at the Lincoln Folk Festival on July 24, 1971, the Byrds booked into a London recording studio with engineer Mike Ross to record their next album. The band's decision to produce the album themselves was almost certainly an attempt to show Melcher that they could do a better job than he had done on Byrdmaniax. During five days of recording between July 22 and July 28, 1971, the Byrds recorded all eleven songs that would appear on Farther Along, with no other songs known to have been attempted by the band during the sessions. The tapes were then brought back to the U.S., where they were mixed by Eric Prestidge at Columbia Studios, Hollywood in August 1971, with the song "Bugler" receiving additional Mandolin and lead vocal overdubs from the band's lead guitarist, Clarence White.

Overall, Farther Along had a much less cluttered sound than its predecessor, as guitarist and band leader Roger McGuinn told journalist David Fricke in 2000: "It was as live as you can get in the studio. We didn't do a lot of overdubs, mostly just the vocals." Nonetheless, while the album succeeded in countering the over-production present on Byrdmaniax, the band themselves weren't particularly satisfied with the finished product. In a 1997 interview, bass player Skip Battin expressed his dissatisfaction with the album by saying "When we finished it, I didn't think we had anything, I thought the stuff was rotten - it didn't sound good, it was scattered and there was no unification." Drummer Gene Parsons concurred with Battin's assessment of the album, stating "I felt that Farther Along was a good album, but it was under produced. It was done really rapidly and it suffered in under production as a reaction to Byrdmaniax."

=== Music ===
The eleven tracks on Farther Along included two written by Battin and his songwriting partner, Kim Fowley. The first of these, "America's Great National Pastime", was a vaudeville-style novelty song that painted a whimsical picture of life in the US and drew humorous comparisons between the taste of Coca-Cola and cocaine. The second Battin–Fowley song, "Precious Kate", was a love song based on a real life incident and was, according to Battin, written in five minutes. Rather than being sung by Battin himself, as most of the Byrds' Battin and Fowley penned songs were, "Precious Kate" featured McGuinn on lead vocal. McGuinn himself contributed the song "Tiffany Queen", a rousing, Chuck Berry-influenced track with amusing, Dylanesque lyrics, inspired by his third wife Linda Gilbert.

Tiffany Queen
Like a number of tracks on Farther Along, the song "Tiffany Queen" exhibits traces of 1950s rock 'n' roll music, most noticeably in Roger McGuinn's Chuck Berry-influenced guitar solo.

The album also included the Larry Murray song "Bugler" which was sung by Clarence White and was regarded by most critics as the album's highlight, as well as one of White's best vocal performances. The moving tale of a boy and his dog, which turns tragic when the dog is killed in a road accident, took on a deeper meaning when White himself was killed by a drunken driver in 1973. "Bugler" was the third in a trio of Byrds' songs about canine companions, with the first being "Old Blue" on Dr. Byrds & Mr. Hyde and the second being "Fido" on Ballad of Easy Rider. White was also responsible for arranging the album's title track, the bluegrass standard "Farther Along", a song that had crossed-over to a rock audience in 1970 when it had appeared on The Flying Burrito Brothers' second album, Burrito Deluxe. The Byrds' recording of the song became more poignant in the years following its release, after "Farther Along" was sung by ex-Byrd Gram Parsons and then-current member of the Eagles, Bernie Leadon, at White's funeral in 1973.

The Byrds' drummer, Gene Parsons (no relation to Gram), contributed two songs to the album: "Get Down Your Line", a reflection on the need for self-improvement, and "B.B. Class Road", a lighthearted song about a road manager's life on tour with a rock band, co-written by the Byrds' roadie, Stuart "Dinky" Dawson. For many years it was assumed that the lead vocal on "B.B. Class Road" was sung by Dawson himself, but Parsons eventually revealed in the early 1990s that it was actually him singing on the track. Parsons went on to elucidate by stating "I wanted Dinky to sing this song but Dinky insisted that I do it. Until now, everyone thought he did. I tried to sing it with an excess of testosterone in the true spirit of rock 'n roll." Parsons further explained to the Byrds' biographer Johnny Rogan in 1997 "I was imitating and taking on a different persona. Stuart and I collaborated and it's me growling and howling out the vocal."

"Antique Sandy" was the result of a songwriting experiment between all four members of the Byrds and their percussionist/road manager Jimmi Seiter. The song's inspiration was Seiter's then girlfriend, who did indeed live in the woods in a house full of antiques, as the song's lyrics indicate. The Bob Rafkin-penned "Lazy Waters" featured a melodramatic lead vocal from Battin, which was enhanced during the song's refrain by the Byrds' trademark crystal clear harmonies. Despite being a cover, the song's wistful yearning for the simpler days of a bucolic childhood had personal significance for Battin, as he explained during a 1979 interview: "'Lazy Waters' was a serious song. I was living in the Mendocino woods and working on the road. I'd known the song a long time. It expressed my feelings about life in the country and life on the road." The band also elected to cover The Fiestas' 1959 hit single "So Fine" on the album, at the suggestion of Clarence White. The addition of "So Fine", along with other rock 'n' roll-influenced songs, such as "Tiffany Queen", "Get Down Your Line", and "B.B. Class Road", provided the album with a 1950s-flavored thematic unity. The final track on Farther Along was a Gene Parsons and Clarence White-penned bluegrass instrumental titled "Bristol Steam Convention Blues". The song had been inspired by Parsons' frustration and disappointment at having narrowly missed the Bristol Steam Convention during both of the Byrds' last two visits to England.

== Release and reception ==
Professional ratings
Review scores
Source	Rating
Allmusic	3/5 stars
Christgau's Record Guide	C
Entertainment Weekly	B+

Farther Along was released on November 17, 1971 in the United States (catalogue item KC 30150) and January 21, 1972 in the United Kingdom (catalogue item S 64676), less than five months after Byrdmaniax. Although the album was issued in stereo commercially, there is some evidence to suggest that mono copies of the album (possibly radio station promos) were distributed in the UK. The album peaked at number 152 on the Billboard Top LPs chart, during a chart stay of seven weeks, but failed to break into the UK Albums Chart. In the U.S., the album was almost the lowest charting of the Byrds' career, being beaten only by Dr. Byrds & Mr. Hyde, which had charted at number 153 during 1969. A single taken from the album, "America's Great National Pastime" b/w "Farther Along", was released on November 29, 1971 but failed to chart in the United States or in the United Kingdom. The single's failure in the UK was due to its being withdrawn by CBS Records shortly after its release in January 1972.

Reaction to the album in the U.S. was more enthusiastic than it had been for Byrdmaniax but still wasn't wholly positive. Andy Mellen, reviewing the album in the Winnipeg Free Press in February 1972, wrote, "[While] not being anywhere the equal of Younger Than Yesterday or even Dr. Byrds & Mr. Hyde, it is an encouraging LP, offering some assurance that Roger McGuinn and friends still have their fingers on the pulse of what's happening musically in 1972." Ben Gerson commented on both the band and the album in the March 1972 issue of Rolling Stone magazine: "There is a programmatic certainty to their music at this point which at first glance happily signifies that a first-generation band has successfully remade itself, but, after repeated exposure disappoints one with its inflexibility." Gerson concluded his review of Farther Along by commenting "This is not an outstanding album, either by Byrds or contemporary standards, though, for at least a Byrds fan, it contains several seductive tunes and some exemplary musicianship. But beneath the old Byrds sound, and this new, quartered approach, there is a more fundamental commitment, and that is to survival." The question of the Byrds' continued existence was also echoed in a contemporary review by Bud Scoppa in the March 1972 edition of Rock magazine, in which he remarked: "The Byrds recognized their failure on Byrdmaniax, but placed the blame on the lavish production job rather than their own disunity. So what we have with Farther Along, evidently rushed out to rectify the problems caused by the last LP, is more disunity, but this time in a basic unadorned state."

In the UK, Farther Along received reasonable reviews in the music press, with many commentators expressing pleasure that the band had reverted to a simpler style of production. The January 29, 1972 edition of Melody Maker commented that it was "Good to hear the Byrds stretching their wings again" before concluding that "Byrdmaniax was the bad news - now for the good news." Caroline Boucher, writing in Disc magazine, awarded the album three stars out of four, while Lon Goddard's review in Record Mirror stated that the album showed the Byrds "slowly drifting away from the more apparent country influences that came to the fore with Sweetheart of the Rodeo and combining into a hybrid that features more of the approach utilised on their earlier albums."

In more recent years, Mark Deming of the Allmusic website has described the album's contents as a "well-crafted set" and compared it to Byrdmaniax by stating "It's certainly a significant improvement, but something short of a triumphant return; the band sounds a bit tired in spots, as if they were starting to run out of gas." In his 2000 review for The Austin Chronicle, Raoul Hernandez gave the album a rating of three and a half stars out of five, commenting "its authentic Dylan and the Band feel solidifies its status as further blueprint of today's roots-rock revival." Rolling Stone senior editor David Fricke described the album favorably in 2000 as "a warm, fine record: a rustic, intimate surprise still rarely appreciated for its quiet nobility and winning performances."

== Post-release ==
Following the release of the album, the Byrds continued to tour the U.S. and Europe throughout 1972, but no new LP or single release was forthcoming and ultimately, Farther Along would turn out to be the last studio album by the McGuinn, White, Parsons, and Battin line-up of the band. The Byrds did, however, record a handful of new songs during 1972 but these remained unreleased at the time. Included among these new songs were versions of David Wiffen's "Lost My Drivin' Wheel" and McGuinn's own "Born to Rock and Roll", recorded on January 12 and April 18, 1972 respectively. "Born to Rock and Roll" was intended for a proposed single release, most likely with "Lost My Drivin' Wheel" as the B-side, but ultimately the single failed to materialize. According to McGuinn, the January 12, 1972 session that produced "Lost My Drivin' Wheel" saw the guitarist being backed, not by the Byrds, but by hired studio musicians. However, since McGuinn was contracted to Columbia Records as a member of the band and not as a solo artist, the studio documentation for this session lists "Lost My Drivin' Wheel" as a Byrds' recording.

In July 1972, Gene Parsons was fired from the group and replaced by session drummer John Guerin, although Guerin was never officially a fully fledged member of the Byrds and instead worked for a standard session musician's rate. Following Parsons' dismissal, a further three songs ("Draggin'", "I'm So Restless", and "Bag Full of Money") were taped by the band at Wally Heider's Studio 3 in Hollywood during July 1972. Ultimately, the five songs recorded by the Byrds throughout 1972 would all be re-recorded for McGuinn's debut solo album, Roger McGuinn, with the exception of "Born to Rock and Roll", which was re-recorded for the Byrds' 1973 reunion album, Byrds. McGuinn did, however, re-record the song for his 1975 solo album, Roger McGuinn & Band.

In January 1973, the band taped a cover version of "Roll Over Beethoven" and a re-recording of their signature song, Bob Dylan's "Mr. Tambourine Man", for the soundtrack to Banjoman, an Earl Scruggs tribute film in which they also starred. Bass player Skip Battin was fired soon after and in late February 1973, McGuinn finally disbanded the latter-day line-up of the Byrds in order to facilitate a reunion of the five original members of the group. The Byrds' reunion was centered around the release of a comeback album in March 1973 and featured McGuinn, along with original band members David Crosby, Gene Clark, Chris Hillman, and Michael Clarke.

Farther Along was remastered at 20-bit resolution as part of the Columbia/Legacy Byrds series. It was reissued in an expanded form on February 22, 2000 with the addition of three bonus tracks. These bonus tracks were all taken from the Byrds' early to mid-1972 studio sessions and included "Lost My Drivin' Wheel", "Born to Rock and Roll" and "Bag Full of Money". The remastered reissue also includes, as a hidden track, an alternate version of "Bristol Steam Convention Blues".

== Track listing ==
=== Side 1 ===
1. "Tiffany Queen" (Roger McGuinn) – 2:40
2. "Get Down Your Line" (Gene Parsons) – 3:26
3. "Farther Along" (Traditional; arranged by Clarence White) – 2:57
4. "B.B. Class Road" (Gene Parsons, Stuart Dawson) – 2:16
5. "Bugler" (Larry Murray) – 3:06

=== Side 2 ===
1. "America's Great National Pastime" (Skip Battin, Kim Fowley) – 2:57
2. "Antique Sandy" (Roger McGuinn, Skip Battin, Gene Parsons, Clarence White, Jimmi Seiter) – 2:13
3. "Precious Kate" (Skip Battin, Kim Fowley) – 2:59
4. "So Fine" (Johnny Otis) – 2:36
5. "Lazy Waters" (Bob Rafkin) – 3:32
6. "Bristol Steam Convention Blues" (Gene Parsons, Clarence White) – 2:39

=== 2000 CD reissue bonus tracks ===
12. "Lost My Drivin' Wheel" (David Wiffen) – 4:56
13. "Born to Rock and Roll" (Roger McGuinn) – 2:59
14. "Bag Full of Money" (Roger McGuinn, Jacques Levy) – 5:58
  - Note: this song ends at 3:18; at 3:29 begins "Bristol Steam Convention Blues" [Alternate Version] (Gene Parsons, Clarence White)

== Personnel ==
Sources for this section are as follows:

The Byrds

- Roger McGuinn – guitar, vocals
- Clarence White – guitar, mandolin, vocals
- Skip Battin – electric bass, piano, vocals
- Gene Parsons – drums, guitar, harmonica, pedal steel guitar, banjo, vocals

Note: Bonus track 12 is a recording not by the Byrds, but by Roger McGuinn and a group of unknown studio musicians. Bonus track 13 features the regular band line-up plus Charles Lloyd (saxophone), an unknown musician (synthesizer), and a number of unnamed female backing singers. Bonus track 14 features McGuinn, White and Battin, along with John Guerin (drums), Buddy Emmons (pedal steel guitar), and an unknown musician (piano).

== Release history ==
Date	Label	Format	Country	Catalog	Notes
November 17, 1971	Columbia	LP	US	KC 30150	Original release.
January 21, 1972	CBS	LP	UK	S 64676	Original release.
1975	Columbia	LP	US	LE 10215	"Columbia limited edition" reissue.
1993	Columbia	CD	UK	COL 468418	Original CD release.
1993	Line	CD	Germany	901024	
February 22, 2000	Columbia/Legacy	CD	US	CK 65849	Reissue containing three bonus tracks and the remastered album.
February 22, 2000	Columbia/Legacy	CD	UK	COL 495078	Reissue containing three bonus tracks and the remastered album.
2003	Sony	CD	Japan	MHCP-106	Reissue containing three bonus tracks and the remastered album in a replica LP sleeve.

=== Single release ===
1. "America's Great National Pastime" b/w "Farther Along" (Columbia 45514) November 29, 1971

== Bibliography ==
- Rogan, Johnny, The Byrds: Timeless Flight Revisited, Rogan House, 1998, ISBN 0-9529540-1-X
- Hjort, Christopher, So You Want To Be A Rock 'n' Roll Star: The Byrds Day-By-Day (1965–1973), Jawbone Press, 2008, ISBN 1-906002-15-0.
