= The Times They Are a-Changin' =

The Times They Are a-Changin' may refer to:

- "The Times They Are a-Changin'" (song), a 1964 song by Bob Dylan
- The Times They Are a-Changin' (Bob Dylan album), the 1964 Bob Dylan album (of which the song is the title track)
- The Times They Are A-Changin' (Burl Ives album), 1968
- The Times They Are a-Changin' (musical), a 2006 musical featuring the songs of Bob Dylan
- The Times They Are a Changing (The Fureys album), 2014
- The Times They Are a-Changin, a 1966 EP by The Byrds
