= Take a Whiff on Me =

Traditional song

Song
- Genre: American folk

"Take a Whiff on Me" (Roud 10062) is an American folk song, with references to the use of cocaine. It is also known as "Take a Whiff (on Me)", "Cocaine Habit", and "Cocaine Habit Blues".

== History ==
This song was collected by John and Alan Lomax from Iron Head and Lead Belly, as well as other sources.

The first recording appears to be the 1930 recording by Memphis Jug Band titled "Cocaine Habit Blues".

== Recordings ==
- Memphis Jug Band The Best of the Memphis Jug Band (titled Cocaine Habit Blues) 1930
- Lead Belly Leadbelly ARC and Library of Congress Recordings Vol. 1 (1934–1935)
- The Greenbriar Boys Ragged But Right! (1964)
- Jerry Garcia (with Mother McCree's Uptown Jug Champions) Mother McCree's Uptown Jug Champions (recorded 1964, released 1998)
- The Byrds (Untitled) (1970), There Is a Season (2006), and Live at Royal Albert Hall 1971 (2008)
- Mungo Jerry (as “Have a Whiff on Me”, 1971 single)
- The New Kentucky Colonels Live in Sweden (recorded 1973, released 1976)
- The Flying Burrito Brothers The Red Album (recorded c. 1975, released 2002)
- Captain Matchbox Whoopee Band (1975 Album, "Australia")
- Mission Mountain Wood Band In Without Knocking (1977)
- Lonnie Donegan's "Have a Drink on Me" on Puttin' On the Style (1978) is a sanitized version of the song, based on Charlie Poole's 1924 recording, "Take a Drink on me"
- Woody Guthrie Muleskinner Blues: The Asch Recordings, Smithsonian Folkways Recordings SFW 40101 (1997)
- The White Stripes Under Blackpool Lights (2004)
- Old Crow Medicine Show: Two versions: As "Tell It to Me" on Old Crow Medicine Show (2004) and with substantially reworked lyrics as "Cocaine Habit" on Big Iron World (2006)

== Print versions ==
- American Ballads and Folk Songs, John Lomax and Alan Lomax, 1934 as "Honey, Take a Whiff on Me"
- Mission Mountain Wood Band, "Take a Whiff on Me", 1970
