= Jamaica Say You Will (song) =

1971 song written by Jackson Browne

Song by Jackson Browne

from the album Jackson Browne
- Written: Fall 1969
- Released: January 2, 1972
- Recorded: 1971
- Studio: Crystal Sound, Hollywood
- Genre: Folk rock
- Length: 3:23
- Label: Asylum
- Songwriter: Jackson Browne
- Producer: Richard Sanford Orshoff

"Jamaica Say You Will" (alternately "Jamaica" and "Jamaica, Say You Will") is a song written and performed by American singer-songwriter Jackson Browne. It is the opening track of his 1972 self-titled debut album.

== History ==
Browne wrote "Jamaica Say You Will" in the fall of 1969. In February 1970 he recorded a demo of the song, with Glenn Frey, Ned Doheny and JD Souther backing him. This demo led to David Geffen signing Browne as a client. The song was first released by The Byrds on their Byrdmaniax album the year before Browne's version came out, so many people were familiar with it before ever hearing Browne's recording.

Allmusic critic William Ruhlmann described the song as "a subtle depiction of a relationship in which a man finds comfort with a woman, Jamaica, but then is forced to follow her if he wants them to stay together." Browne has referred to the song as a "fable," but one based in real experience. "I thought I was kind of writing it for this girl I knew that worked in a garden in Zuma Beach, across the street from the Pacific Ocean, and she worked in this organic food orchard," Browne said in an interview, "like the Garden of Eden, and she was the kind of Eden-like girl, too." He continues: "When I created the fable of this girl who lived by the sea and whose father is a captain, and eventually she would be taken away and go sailing off, I wanted to hide in the relationship. I wanted to sort of have the cocoon of this relationship to just stay sort of insulated from the world. And she was ready to move out into the world and was... you know, the relationship had broken up. That's the ... reality that was going on in my life. I just think it's odd that that's exactly how songs come into being, but if you feel it, it's about something."

"Jamaica Say You Will" fits into Browne's concern with water-based lyric themes and explores the dichotomy between wet and dry, an issue Browne would continue to return to. The song ends with the singer singing that he and Jamaica will sail together "until our waters have run dry."

The song seemingly is a more straightforwardly traditional and conventional narrative than much of Browne's other early works, but the lyrics about a lost love can be read dually as a period piece - with its references to Jamaica as "daughter of a captain on the rolling seas" and to her sister ringing the "evening bell" - and, as Browne seems to confirm, as a memory of a lost young love from Browne's past near the California coast.

She would stare across the water from the trees
Last time he was home he held her on his knees
And said the next time they would sail away just where they pleased.

The narrator wants her to stay to "help me find a way to fill these empty hours; say you will come again tomorrow," but "next thing I knew, we had brought her things down to the bay -- what could I do."

Browne performed the song on The Old Grey Whistle Test in 1972.

== Music and lyrics ==
Calling it an "exquisite love song," in 1972, Bud Scoppa in Rolling Stone spent a large part of his review discussing and gushing about "Jamaica Say You Will," explaining how he felt the song "perfectly embodies Browne's writing and performing approach:"

"A full-chorded grand piano gives the song a rolling, even motion and a certain austerity of mood. Browne plays his voice off the piano's restrained tone, soaring up from his own basically understated vocal in mid-verse and chorus. This underplaying of mood lights Jackson's simple but evocative images with a muted radiance that aurally captures the look of McCabe and Mrs. Miller. While the music sets the tone, Browne deftly tells the tale, his imagery charged with vivid suggestion. ... Much of the dramatic force of "Jamaica" derives from its gorgeous choruses. Each chorus builds tension by offsetting its lyrical meter from the movement of the music, so that the first part of each line is packed tightly and the second part is stretched out, as here, in the second chorus:

Jamaica Sayyy yoou wi-lll
Help-me-find-a Wayyy tooo fi-lll
These-lifeless-sails-and Stayyy uhhhntil
My ships can find the sea.

Harmonies enter at the "Sayyy" section of each of the first three lines, accenting the rush of words that precedes them. All the tension built up by the struggle for balance between the lyrical and musical structures resolves itself gracefully in the even last line. Naturally, Browne's single-minded delivery drives the tension to even greater heights, and the song soars. It's as moving a love song as I've ever heard."

Clarence White played lead acoustic guitar on the song.

== Reception ==
Glide critic Lee Zimmerman rated it as one of 10 Jackson Browne songs that should have been a hit, saying that it "provided a universal connection, dwelling on memories of times well-spent, when trouble and turmoil were displaced by idyllic innocence" and that "few [songs from Browne's debut album] equalled it as far as those longing sentiments were concerned."

== The Byrds version ==
"Jamaica Say You Will"

Song by The Byrds

from the album Byrdmaniax
- Released: June 23, 1971
- Recorded: January 17, 1971
- Studio: Columbia, Hollywood
- Genre: Country rock
- Length: 3:27
- Label: Columbia
- Songwriter: Jackson Browne
- Producer: Terry Melcher

The Byrds released a version of "Jamaica Say You Will" on Byrdmaniax in 1971, before Browne's version was released. The Byrds first recorded the song on January 17, 1971, with Browne in the studio. Browne played piano on one take but the take was not used. According to Byrds' bassist Skip Battin:

We had done one dynamite cut of "Jamaica Say You Will", which Jackson Browne had played piano on, and it was not even used. He had come in and taught us the song and Gene [Parsons], Clarence [White], Jackson and I laid down this beautiful track, which was really hot and very tasty, but for some reason it was considered the demo.

Many critics regarded it as the best song on the album. The band was unhappy with the production by Terry Melcher, such as the addition of strings and horns. Drummer Gene Parsons claimed that Melcher did not use the best take of the song. Lead singer Clarence White said:

On "Jamaica" I tried to do an excellent recording because I knew Jackson Browne was going to be known as a great singer and incredible songwriter. We did a good track underneath there, but when they added the strings there were almost 40 people in the studio, and they had to listen to the track because we don't always tune on pitch. Instead of tuning to the piano, they had to tune from the earphones. So the whole orchestra is a little sharp and I'm flat. I was embarrassed when I heard it.

Melcher defended himself saying that:

Clarence wasn't that great a singer in technical terms. I just chose the version that I thought was the best. [Byrd guitarist Roger McGuinn's ex-wife] Linda Carradine later told me that there was some friction in the group because Roger didn't like the idea of Clarence singing that song and wanted it for himself.

Allmusic critic Matthew Greenwald called it "a love song with an aching, searching quality" and saying that "the song has a true California pop/folk quality, and it's not surprising that the Byrds would record it." Greenwald praised the vocal arrangement and production, and said that "although the band wasn't happy with producer Terry Melcher's decision to add strings and horns to the track, it has aged quite well." Uncut critic Jason Anderson felt it was one of the strongest cuts on Byrdmaniax, particularly noting the "familiar vocal harmonies." Andy McArthur found the released take to be "uninspired" and criticized the fact that the vocal was buried in the mix, but praised McGuinn's guitar and the vocal harmonies.

Music critic Johnny Rogan agreed with the band that the production was odd, noting that Parsons' drumming was sometimes inaudible, the lead guitar sounded sharp, the vocal sounded weak, and the strings "created an unusual, but not unpleasant, effect."

The Byrds also included the song on their live album Live at Royal Albert Hall 1971, released in 2008.

== Other cover versions ==
"Jamaica Say You Will" was also covered by the Nitty Gritty Dirt Band on All the Good Times in 1972, Tom Rush on Merrimack County in 1972 and Joe Cocker on Jamaica Say You Will in 1975.

Allmusic critic William Ruhlmann criticized Joe Cocker's version, saying that "though the Jackson Browne song was a strong piece of material, it worked originally because of its restraint, not in the overwrought way Cocker treated it."

In 2021, Los Lobos covered the song on their tribute to Los Angeles: Native Sons.

== Use in other media ==
The song is heard playing on the radio at the end of The Wonder Years episode "The Lake" from Season 5. However, the episode is set in August 1971, several months before the album was released.
