= Eric "Monty" Morris =

Jamaican ska singer (born 1942)

- Born: c. 1942
- Origin: Kingston, Jamaica
- Genres: Ska, reggae
- Years active: Early 1950s–present
- Labels: Blue Beat, Treasure Isle

Eric "Monty" Morris (born c.1942) is a Jamaican ska singer, known for his work with the Skatalites and hit singles such as "Sammy Dead Oh" and "Oil in My Lamp".

== Background ==
Morris grew up in the Trench Town area of Kingston and like many singers of the era, Morris started by competing in talent contests in the early 1950s, including Vere Johns' Opportunity Hour, and made his first recording with Derrick Morgan. Morris went on to record several singles for Prince Buster and Duke Reid and was the original vocalist for The Skatalites. He also recorded as a duo with Roy Panton. Morris had a hit in 1961 with the song "Humpty Dumpty".

== Career ==
In 1962, "Money Can't Buy Life" which he composed was backed with "True Love" by Hortense Ellis & Stranger Cole. Produced by Prince Buster, it was released in the UK on Blue Beat BB83.

In the wake of two big Jamaican hits with "Sammy Dead Oh" and "Oil in My Lamp" he performed in the United States at the 1964 New York World's Fair as part of a Jamaican group of musicians that also included Millie Small, Jimmy Cliff, and Byron Lee & the Dragonaires. He later recorded for Clancy Eccles in 1968, including the hit "Say What You're Saying", and for Lee "Scratch" Perry in 1969.

== Later years ==
In the late 1970s, Morris emigrated to the United States, living in Washington DC and San Diego before settling in Florida in the early 2000s. In 1998 he returned to Jamaica to perform at the Heineken Startime show. As of 2016 he was still performing regularly.

His "Enna Bella" was used in the soundtrack of the 2003 Jim Jarmusch film Coffee and Cigarettes. His music has been included on many ska and reggae compilations.

In January 2020 it was announced that Morris would be the 2020 recipient of the Lifetime Achievement Award from the Jamaica Reggae Industry Association (JaRIA).
