= Chestnut Mare =

- Cover artwork for the single, as used in the Netherlands.

Single by The Byrds

from the album (Untitled)
- B-side: "Just a Season"
- Released: October 23, 1970
- Recorded: June 1 – June 5, June 9, June 11, 1970
- Studio: Columbia Studios, Hollywood, CA
- Genre: Country rock
- Length: 5:08; 2:58 (single edit)
- Label: Columbia
- Songwriter(s): Roger McGuinn, Jacques Levy
- Producer(s): Terry Melcher, Jim Dickson

The Byrds singles chronology
"Jesus Is Just Alright" (1969)	"Chestnut Mare" (1970)	"I Trust (Everything Is Gonna Work Out Alright)" (1971)

Audio sample
- file; help

"Chestnut Mare" is a song by the American rock band the Byrds, written by Roger McGuinn and Jacques Levy during 1969 for a planned country rock musical named Gene Tryp. The musical was never staged and the song was instead released in September 1970 as part of the Byrds' (Untitled) album. It was later issued as a single, peaking at number 121 on the Billboard singles chart and number 19 on the UK Singles Chart.

== Composition ==
Throughout most of 1969, the Byrds' leader and guitarist, Roger McGuinn, had been writing songs with psychologist and Broadway impresario Jacques Levy for a country rock stage production of Henrik Ibsen's Peer Gynt that the pair were developing. The intended title for the musical was Gene Tryp, an anagram of the title of Ibsen's play.

McGuinn and Levy's production was to loosely follow the storyline of Peer Gynt, albeit with some modifications to transpose the story from Norway to south-west America during the mid-19th century. Ultimately, the Gene Tryp stage production was abandoned and among the twenty-six songs that McGuinn and Levy had written for the project, six (including "Chestnut Mare") would end up being released on the Byrds' (Untitled) and Byrdmaniax albums.

"Chestnut Mare" was intended to be used during a scene in which the play's eponymous hero attempts to catch and tame a wild horse, a scene that had featured a deer in Ibsen's original. While the majority of "Chestnut Mare" had been written specifically for Gene Tryp, the musical accompaniment to the song's middle section had actually been written by McGuinn back in the early 1960s, while on tour in South America with the Chad Mitchell Trio.

Musically, "Chestnut Mare" echoes the sound of the Byrds' mid-1960s recordings, with McGuinn's chiming 12-string Rickenbacker guitar sitting alongside guitarist Clarence White's country-style acoustic and electric guitar picking. Lyrically, the song's spoken verses recount the story of one man's quest to tame a wild horse, and, as such, it echoes the familiar Byrds' themes of nature and freedom. Byrds expert Tim Connors has also suggested that the song's narrative can be seen to deal in mythic archetypes: the wild mare being an embodiment of untamed nature, which the narrator wants to control, and thus an analogy of mankind's attempts to dominate and subjugate the natural environment.

== Release and reception ==
"Chestnut Mare" was initially released as part of the Byrds' (Untitled) album on September 14, 1970. It was then issued as a single on October 23, 1970, with "Just a Season", another McGuinn and Levy song left over from the Gene Tryp project, on the B-side. The single stalled at number 121 on the Billboard singles chart, but nonetheless, "Chestnut Mare" went on to become a staple of FM radio programming in America during the 1970s.

The song did much better, however, when it was released as a single in the United Kingdom on January 1, 1971, reaching number 19 on the UK Singles Chart, during a chart stay of eight weeks. "Chestnut Mare" was the first UK Top 20 hit that the Byrds had achieved since their cover of Bob Dylan's "All I Really Want to Do" had peaked at number 4 in September 1965.

Although the U.S. single release featured the full-length album version of "Chestnut Mare", in the UK and Europe a severely edited version of the song was issued instead. The running time of the album version is 5:08, while the single edit is noticeably shorter at 2:58, due to the removal of the song's second verse and middle section. This same edited version was issued as a promo 45 in the U.S. as well.

Following its appearance on the (Untitled) album, the song would go on to become a staple of the Byrds' live concert repertoire, until their final disbandment in 1973. The band also performed the song in 1971 and 1972 on the German music television program, Beat-Club.

In addition to its appearance on the (Untitled) album, "Chestnut Mare" appears on several Byrds' compilations, including The Best of The Byrds: Greatest Hits, Volume II, History of The Byrds, The Byrds, The Very Best of The Byrds, The Essential Byrds, and There Is a Season. A live performance of the song is also included on The Byrds' Live at Royal Albert Hall 1971 album.

The Icicle Works covered "Chestnut Mare" as a medley with another Byrds' song, "Triad", on the 1989 Byrds' tribute album, Time Between – A Tribute to The Byrds.
