= (Untitled) (The Byrds album) =

Studio album / Live album by the Byrds
- Released: September 14, 1970
- Recorded: Live album: February 28, 1970, Colden Auditorium, Queens College, New York City; March 1, 1970, Felt Forum, New York City; Studio album: May 26 – June 11, 1970, Columbia, Hollywood
- Genres: Rock; country rock; jam rock; psychedelic rock
- Length: 71:27
- Label: Columbia
- Producers: Terry Melcher, Jim Dickson

The Byrds chronology
Ballad of Easy Rider (1969)	(Untitled) (1970)	Byrdmaniax (1971)

Singles from (Untitled)
- 1. "Chestnut Mare" Released: October 23, 1970

(Untitled) is the ninth album by the American rock band the Byrds and was released in September 1970 on Columbia Records. It is a double album, with the first LP featuring live concert recordings from early 1970, and a second disc consisting of new studio recordings. The album represented the first official release of any live recordings by the band, as well as the first appearance on a Byrds' record of new recruit Skip Battin, who had replaced the band's previous bass player, John York, in late 1969.

The studio album mostly consists of newly written, self-penned material, including a number of songs that had been composed by band leader Roger McGuinn and Broadway theatre director Jacques Levy for a planned country rock musical that the pair were developing. The production was to have been based on Henrik Ibsen's Peer Gynt and staged under the title of Gene Tryp (an anagram of Ibsen's play), but plans for the musical fell through. Five of the songs that had been intended for Gene Tryp were instead recorded by the Byrds for (Untitled)—although only four appear in the album's final running order.

The album peaked at number 40 on the Billboard Top LPs chart and reached number 11 on the UK Albums Chart. A single taken from the album, "Chestnut Mare" b/w "Just a Season", was released in the U.S. in October 1970, but missed the Billboard Hot 100 chart, bubbling under at number 121. The single was later released in the UK in January 1971, where it did considerably better, reaching number 19 on the UK Singles Chart. Upon release, (Untitled) was met with positive reviews and strong sales, with many critics and fans regarding the album as a return to form for the band. Likewise, the album is today generally regarded by critics as being the best that the latter-day line-up of the Byrds produced.

== Background ==
Following the dismissal of the Byrds' bass player, John York, in September 1969, Skip Battin was recruited as a replacement at the suggestion of drummer Gene Parsons and guitarist Clarence White. Battin was, at 35, the oldest member of the band and the one with the longest musical history. Battin's professional career in music had begun in 1959, as one half of the pop music duo Skip & Flip. The duo had notched up a string of hits between 1959 and 1961, including "It Was I", "Fancy Nancy", and "Cherry Pie". After the break-up of Skip & Flip, Battin moved to Los Angeles, where he worked as a freelance session musician and formed the band Evergreen Blueshoes. Following the disbandment of that group, Battin returned to session work in the late 1960s and it was during this period that he met Gene Parsons and became reacquainted with Clarence White, whom he had known from a few years earlier. York's dismissal and Battin's recruitment marked the last line-up change to the Byrds for almost three years, until Parsons was fired by McGuinn in July 1972. Thus, the McGuinn, White, Parsons, and Battin line-up of the band was the most stable and longest lived of any configuration of the Byrds.

For most of 1969, the Byrds' leader and guitarist, Roger McGuinn, had been developing a country rock stage production of Henrik Ibsen's Peer Gynt with former psychologist and Broadway impresario Jacques Levy. The musical was to be titled Gene Tryp, an anagram of the title of Ibsen's play, and would loosely follow the storyline of Peer Gynt, with some modifications to transpose the action from Norway to south-west America during the mid-19th century. The musical was intended as a prelude to even loftier plans of McGuinn's to produce a science-fiction film, tentatively titled Ecology 70 and starring former Byrd Gram Parsons (unrelated to Gene Parsons) and ex-member of the Mamas & the Papas, Michelle Phillips, as a pair of intergalactic flower children. Ultimately, Gene Tryp was abandoned and a handful of the songs that McGuinn and Levy had written for the project would instead see release on (Untitled) and its follow-up, Byrdmaniax.

Of the twenty-six songs that were written for the musical, "Chestnut Mare", "Lover of the Bayou", "All the Things", and "Just a Season" were included on (Untitled), while "Kathleen's Song" and "I Wanna Grow Up to Be a Politician" were held over for the Byrds' next album. "Lover of the Bayou" would be re-recorded by McGuinn in 1975 and appear on his Roger McGuinn & Band album.

Despite not being staged at the time, Gene Tryp was eventually performed in a revised configuration by the drama students of Colgate University, between November 18 and November 21, 1992, under the new title of Just a Season: A Romance of the Old West.

=== Conception and title ===
Having toured extensively throughout 1969 and early 1970, the Byrds decided that the time was right to issue a live album. At the same time, it was felt that the band had a sufficient backlog of new compositions to warrant the recording of a new studio album. The dilemma was resolved when it was suggested by producer Terry Melcher that the band should release a double album, featuring an LP of concert recordings and an LP of new studio recordings, which would retail for the same price as a regular single album. At around this same time, the band's original manager Jim Dickson, who had been fired by the group in June 1967, returned to the Byrds' camp to help Melcher with the editing of the live recordings, affording him a co-producer credit on (Untitled).

The album's innominate title actually came about by accident. According to Jim Bickhart's liner notes on the original double album sleeve, the group's intention was to name the release something more grandiose, such as Phoenix or The Byrds' First Album. These working titles were intended to signify the artistic rebirth that the band felt the album represented. Another proposed title for the album was McGuinn, White, Parsons and Battin, but McGuinn felt that this title might be misinterpreted by the public. The band still had not made up their minds regarding a title when Melcher, while filling out record company documentation for the album sessions, wrote the placeholder "(Untitled)" in a box specifying the album's title. A misunderstanding ensued and before anyone associated with the band had realized, Columbia Records had pressed up the album with that title, including the parentheses.

== Live recordings ==
The latter-day line-up of the Byrds, featuring McGuinn, White, Parsons, and Battin, was regarded by critics and audiences as being much more accomplished in concert than previous configurations of the band had been. This being the case, it made perfect sense to capture their sound in a live environment, and so two consecutive New York concert appearances were recorded. The first of these was the band's performance at Queens College's Colden Auditorium on February 28, 1970, and the second was their performance at the Felt Forum on March 1, 1970.

(Untitled) featured recordings from both of these concerts, spliced together to give the impression of a single continuous performance. Of the seven live tracks featured on the album, "So You Want to Be a Rock 'n' Roll Star", "Mr. Tambourine Man", "Mr. Spaceman", and "Eight Miles High" were drawn from the Queens College performance, while "Lover of the Bayou", "Positively 4th Street", and "Nashville West" originated from the Felt Forum show. Byrds biographer Johnny Rogan has suggested that the appearance of the band's earlier hit singles "Mr. Tambourine Man", "So You Want to Be a Rock 'n' Roll Star", and "Eight Miles High" on the live record had the effect of forging a spiritual and musical link between the band's current line-up and the original mid-1960s incarnation of the band.

The opening track of the live LP is "Lover of the Bayou", a new song written by McGuinn and Levy for their aborted Gene Tryp stage show. The song is set during the American Civil War and was intended for a scene in which the eponymous hero of the musical is working as a smuggler, bootlegger, and gun runner for both the Confederacy and the Unionists. Despite the central character's appearance in the scene, McGuinn explained in a 1970 interview with journalist Vincent Flanders that the song wasn't actually intended to be sung by Gene Tryp, but by another character, a voodoo witch-doctor (or houngan) named Big Cat.

"Lover of the Bayou" is followed on the album by a cover of Bob Dylan's "Positively 4th Street", which would be the last Dylan song that the Byrds covered on an album until "Paths of Victory", which was recorded during the 1990 reunion sessions featured on The Byrds box set. The remainder of side one of (Untitled) is made up of live versions of album tracks and earlier hits. In a 1999 interview with journalist David Fricke, McGuinn explained the rationale behind the inclusion of earlier Byrds' material on the album: "The live album was Melcher's way of repackaging some of the hits in a viable way. Actually, I wanted the studio stuff to come first. Terry wouldn't hear of it."

Side two of the live album is taken up in its entirety by a sixteen-minute, extended version of "Eight Miles High", which proved to be popular on progressive rock radio during the early 1970s. The track is highlighted by the dramatic guitar interplay between McGuinn and White, as well as the intricate bass and drum playing of Battin and Parsons. The song begins with improvisational jamming, which lasts for over twelve minutes and culminates in an iteration of the song's first verse. Rogan has stated the opinion that the revamping of "Eight Miles High" featured on (Untitled) represented the ultimate fusion of the original Byrds and the newer line-up. At the end of this live performance of "Eight Miles High", the band can be heard playing a rendition of their signature stage tune, "Hold It", which had first been heard on record at the close of the "My Back Pages/B.J. Blues/Baby What You Want Me to Do" medley included on Dr. Byrds & Mr. Hyde.

Additional live material from the Byrds' early 1970 appearances at Queens College and the Felt Forum has been officially released over the years. "Lover of the Bayou", "Black Mountain Rag (Soldier's Joy)", and a cover of Lowell George's "Willin'", taken from the Queens College concert, were included on The Byrds box set in 1990. Additionally, performances of "You Ain't Goin' Nowhere", "Old Blue", "It's Alright, Ma (I'm Only Bleeding)", "Ballad of Easy Rider", "My Back Pages", and "This Wheel's on Fire" from the Felt Forum show were included on the expanded (Untitled)/(Unissued) release in 2000. A further two songs, "You All Look Alike" and "Nashville West", taken from the Queen's College concert were included on the 2006 box set, There Is a Season.

== Studio recordings ==
The studio recording sessions for (Untitled) were produced by Terry Melcher and took place between May 26 and June 11, 1970 at Columbia Studios in Hollywood, California. Melcher had been the producer of the Byrds' first two albums in 1965, Mr. Tambourine Man and Turn! Turn! Turn!, as well as producer of their previous LP, Ballad of Easy Rider. The majority of the songs included on the studio album were penned by the band members themselves, in stark contrast to their previous album, which had largely consisted of cover versions or renditions of traditional material.

Among the songs recorded for the album were Parsons and Battin's "Yesterday's Train", a gentle meditation on the theme of reincarnation; a cover of Lowell George and Bill Payne's "Truck Stop Girl", sung by Clarence White; and a light-hearted reading of Lead Belly's "Take a Whiff on Me". The album also included the Battin-penned "Well Come Back Home", a heartfelt comment on the Vietnam War. Battin explained the song's genesis to Rogan during a 1979 interview: "I was personally touched by the Vietnam situation, and my feelings about it came out in that song. I had a high school friend who died out there and I guess my thoughts were on him at the time." Battin also revealed in the same interview that he couldn't decide whether to name the song "Well Come Back Home" or "Welcome Back Home", but finally settled on the former. Curiously, although the song was listed on the original album and the original CD issue of (Untitled) as "Well Come Back Home", it was listed as "Welcome Back Home" on the (Untitled)/(Unissued) re-release in 2000, possibly in error. With a running time of 7:40, the song is the longest studio recording in the Byrds' entire oeuvre. In addition, the song also continues the tradition of ending the Byrds' albums on an unusual note, with Battin chanting the Nichiren Buddhist mantra "Nam Myoho Renge Kyo" towards the end of the song.

"Chestnut Mare" had originally been written during 1969 for the abandoned Gene Tryp stage production. The song was intended to be used in a scene where Gene Tryp attempts to catch and tame a wild horse, a scene that had originally featured a deer in Ibsen's Peer Gynt. Although the majority of "Chestnut Mare" had been written specifically for Gene Tryp, the lilting middle section had actually been written by McGuinn back in the early 1960s, while on tour in South America as a member of the Chad Mitchell Trio.

Two other songs originally intended for Gene Tryp were also included on the studio half of (Untitled): "All the Things", which included an uncredited appearance by former Byrd Gram Parsons on backing vocals, and "Just a Season", which was written for a scene in which the eponymous hero of the musical circumnavigates the globe. Lyrically, "Just a Season" touches on a variety of different subjects, including reincarnation, life's journey, fleeting romantic encounters and finally, stardom, as touchingly illustrated by the semi-autobiographical line, "It really wasn't hard to be a star."

The album also includes the song "Hungry Planet", which was written by Battin and record producer, songwriter, and impresario Kim Fowley. The song is one of two Battin–Fowley collaborations included on (Untitled) and features a lead vocal performance by McGuinn. The ecological theme present in the song's lyrics appealed to McGuinn, who received a co-writing credit after he completely restructured its melody prior to recording. Journalist Matthew Greenwald, writing for the AllMusic website, has described "Hungry Planet" as having an underlying psychedelic atmosphere, which is enhanced by the sound of the Moog modular synthesizer (played by McGuinn) and the addition of earthquake sound effects. The album's second Battin–Fowley penned song, "You All Look Alike", was again sung by McGuinn and provided a sardonic view of the plight of the hippie in American society.

There were six other songs that were attempted during the (Untitled) recording sessions, but were not present in the album's final running order. Of these, "Kathleen's Song" would be held over until Byrdmaniax, a cover of Dylan's "Just Like a Woman" would not be issued until the release of The Byrds box set in 1990, and a second Lowell George song, "Willin'", along with John Newton's Christian hymn "Amazing Grace" were eventually issued as bonus tracks on the (Untitled)/(Unissued) re-release in 2000 ("Amazing Grace" appearing as a hidden track). Additionally, an improvised jam was recorded during the album sessions and was logged in the Columbia files under the title of "Fifteen Minute Jam". Two different excerpts from this jam were later issued on The Byrds box set and (Untitled)/(Unissued), where they were given the retronyms of "White's Lightning Pt.1" and "White's Lightning Pt.2" respectively.

One other song attempted in the studio, but not included on (Untitled), was a cover of Dylan's "It's Alright, Ma (I'm Only Bleeding)". As of 2026, this track has never been officially released, although a live version is included on (Untitled)/(Unissued). "Lover of the Bayou" was also recorded during studio sessions for (Untitled), but ultimately, a live recording of the song would be included on the album instead, with the studio recording appearing for the first time on the (Untitled)/(Unissued) reissue.

== Release ==
(Untitled) was released on September 14, 1970 in the United States (catalogue item G 30127) and November 13, 1970 in the United Kingdom (catalogue item S 64095). Despite being a double album release, it retailed at a price similar to that of a single album, in an attempt to provide value for money and increase sales. The album peaked at number 40 on the Billboard Top LPs chart during a stay of twenty-one weeks. It reached number 11 in the United Kingdom, where it spent a total of four weeks on the charts. The "Chestnut Mare" single was released some weeks after the album, on October 23, 1970, and bubbled under at number 121 on the Billboard singles chart. It fared better when it was released in the UK on January 1, 1971, reaching number 19 on the UK Singles Chart, during a chart stay of eight weeks. "Chestnut Mare" went on to become a staple of FM radio programming in America during the 1970s.

Although (Untitled) was released exclusively in stereo commercially, there is some evidence to suggest that mono copies of the album (possibly radio station promos) were distributed in the U.S. In addition, there are advance promo copies of the album known to exist which list both "Kathleen's Song" and "Hold It" as being on the album: the former under the simplified title of "Kathleen" and the latter as "Tag". While "Hold It" does indeed appear on the official album release, at the end of the live recording of "Eight Miles High", it was not listed as a separate track on commercially released copies of the album. "Kathleen's Song", however, was not included in the album's final running order.

The album cover artwork was designed by Eve Babitz and featured photographs taken by Nancy Chester of the Byrds upon the steps of Griffith Observatory in Los Angeles, with the view of L.A. that originally made up the background being replaced by a desert scene. When the double album gatefold sleeve was opened up, the front and back cover photographs were mirrored symmetrically in a style reminiscent of the work of graphic artist M. C. Escher. The inside gatefold featured four individual black & white photographic portraits of the band members, along with liner notes written by Jim Bickhart and Derek Taylor.

(Untitled) is the only double album to be released by the Byrds (excluding later compilations) and is therefore the band's longest album by far. In fact, the studio LP alone, which has a running time of roughly 38 minutes, is longer than any other Byrds album—despite containing fewer tracks than any of the band's other albums.

== Reception ==
Professional ratings
Review scores
Source	Rating
AllMusic	4/5 stars
The Austin Chronicle	4/5 stars
Blender	3/5 stars
Disc	4/4 stars
Encyclopedia of Popular Music	4/5 stars
The Great Rock Discography	6/10
Music Story	3/5 stars
MusicHound Rock	4/5
The Rolling Stone Album Guide	2/5 stars
The Village Voice	C+
Record Collector	4/5 stars

Upon its release, (Untitled) was met with widespread critical acclaim and strong international sales, with advance orders alone accounting for the sale of 100,000 copies. The album's success continued the revival of the band's commercial fortunes that had begun with the release of their previous album, Ballad of Easy Rider. Many fans at the time regarded the album as a return to greatness for the Byrds and this opinion was echoed by many journalists.

Bud Scoppa, writing in the November 16, 1970 edition of Rock magazine, described the album as "easily their best recorded performance so far – in its own class as much as the records of the old Byrds were – and I think one of the best half-dozen albums of 1970." Ben Edmonds' review in the December issue of Fusion magazine was also full of praise: "(Untitled) is a joyous re-affirmation of life; it is the story of a band reborn. The Byrds continue to grow musically and lead stylistically, but they do so with an unailing sense of their past." Edmonds concluded his review by noting that, "History will no doubt bear out the significance of the Byrds' contribution to American popular music, but, for the time being, such speculations are worthless because (Untitled) says that the Byrds will be making their distinctive contributions for quite some time to come."

In a contemporary review for Jazz & Pop magazine, Bruce Harris declared that the album "brings the Byrds back as the super cosmic-cowboys of all time, and is without question their greatest achievement since The Notorious Byrd Brothers." However, Lester Bangs was less enthusiastic about the album in his review for Rolling Stone magazine: "This double album set is probably the most perplexing album the Byrds have ever made. Some of it is fantastic and some is very poor or seemingly indifferent (which is worse), and between the stuff that will rank with their best and the born outtakes lies a lot of rather watery music, which is hard to find much fault with but still harder for even a diehard Byrds freak to work up any enthusiasm about." In a negative review for The Village Voice in 1971, Robert Christgau found the songs "unarresting", their harmonies "weak or just absent", and the live performances poorly captured on vinyl.

In the UK, Disc magazine hailed the album as "probably the most intelligent collection of songs ever assembled on a double LP... The Byrds show they retain all their imagination yet at the same time retain their unique sound." Roy Carr, writing in the NME, commented that, "the Byrds still retain an artistry and freshness unmatched by most others in their genius. Even changes in personnel and direction haven't dulled their appeal or magical charms." Yet another complimentary review came from the pen of Richard Williams, who described the album as "simply their most satisfying work to date" in his review for the Melody Maker.

In his review of the album for AllMusic, Bruce Eder said that although (Untitled) was always considered by fans to be "the one to own" among the band's post-1968 output, it has, since its initial release, risen in the estimation of some critics more than any other Byrds' album. Eder goes on to attempt to evaluate the album's significance within the context of the Byrds' back catalogue: "listening to this album nearly 40 years later, it now seems as though this is the place where the latter-day version of the group finally justified itself as something more important than just a continuation of the mid-'60s band." In his 2000 review for The Austin Chronicle, Raoul Hernandez described it as, "beginning with a biting live set before giving way to a studio side of crackling Americana fare."

(Untitled) was remastered at 20-bit resolution as part of the Columbia/Legacy Byrds series. It was reissued in an expanded form with the new title of (Untitled)/(Unissued) on February 22, 2000. The remastered reissue of the album contains an entire bonus CD of previously unreleased live and studio material from the period. The six studio based bonus tracks on the reissue include alternate versions of "All the Things", "Yesterday's Train", and "Lover of the Bayou", along with the outtake "Kathleen's Song". The remaining eight bonus tracks are live recordings taken from the Byrds' concerts on March 1, 1970 at the Felt Forum and September 23, 1970 at the Fillmore East.

== Track listing ==
All tracks are written by Roger McGuinn and Jacques Levy, except where noted.

Side one (live)
No.	Title	Writer(s)	Length
1.	"Lover of the Bayou"		3:39
2.	"Positively 4th Street"	Bob Dylan	3:03
3.	"Nashville West"	Gene Parsons, Clarence White	2:07
4.	"So You Want to Be a Rock 'n' Roll Star"	Chris Hillman, McGuinn	2:38
5.	"Mr. Tambourine Man"	Dylan	2:14
6.	"Mr. Spaceman"	McGuinn	3:07

Side two (live)
No.	Title	Writer(s)	Length
1.	"Eight Miles High"	Gene Clark, David Crosby, McGuinn	16:03

Side three (studio)
No.	Title	Writer(s)	Length
1.	"Chestnut Mare"		5:08
2.	"Truck Stop Girl"	Lowell George, Bill Payne	3:20
3.	"All the Things"		3:03
4.	"Yesterday's Train"	Skip Battin, Parsons	3:31
5.	"Hungry Planet"	Battin, Kim Fowley, McGuinn	4:50

Side four (studio)
No.	Title	Writer(s)	Length
1.	"Just a Season"		3:50
2.	"Take a Whiff on Me"	Huddie Ledbetter, Alan Lomax, John Lomax	3:24
3.	"You All Look Alike"	Battin, Fowley	3:03
4.	"Welcome Back Home"	Battin	7:40
Total length:			71:27

(Untitled) / (Unissued) (2000 CD reissue) bonus tracks
No.	Title	Writer(s)	Length
1.	"All the Things" (alternate version)		4:56
2.	"Yesterday's Train" (alternate version)	Battin, Parsons	4:10
3.	"Lover of the Bayou" (studio)		5:13
4.	"Kathleen's Song" (alternate version)		2:34
5.	"White's Lightning Pt. 2"	McGuinn, White	2:21
6.	"Willin'"	George	3:28
7.	"You Ain't Goin' Nowhere" (live)	Dylan	2:56
8.	"Old Blue" (live)	traditional, arranged by McGuinn	3:30
9.	"It's Alright, Ma (I'm Only Bleeding)" (live)	Dylan	2:49
10.	"Ballad of Easy Rider" (live)	McGuinn	2:22
11.	"My Back Pages" (live)	Dylan	2:41
12.	"Take a Whiff on Me" (live)	Ledbetter, Alan Lomax, John Lomax	2:45
13.	"Jesus Is Just Alright" (live)	Art Reynolds	3:09
14.	"This Wheel's on Fire" (live)	Rick Danko, Dylan	6:16

- Note: "This Wheels on Fire" ends at 5:08. "Amazing Grace" (traditional, arranged by Battin, McGuinn, Parsons, White) begins at 5:17.

Mono bonus tracks

1. "Chestnut Mare" [Single Version] – 2:57
2. "Just a Season" [Single Version] – 3:31

Stereo bonus tracks

1. "White's Lightning Pt.1" – 2:36
2. "All the Things" [Alternate Version] – 4:57
3. "Lover of the Bayou" [Prev. Unissued Stereo Version] – 5:13
4. "Yesterday's Train" [Alternate Version] – 4:10
5. "Willin'" [Prev. Unissued Studio Version] – 3:28
6. "White's Lightning Pt.2" – 2:21
7. "Kathleen's Song" [Alternate Version] – 2:35
8. "Just Like a Woman" [Prev. Unissued Version] – 3:59
9. "You All Look Alike" [Live] – 3:09
10. "Nashville West" [Live] – 2:12
11. "Willin'" [Live] – 3:13
12. "Black Mountain Rag (Soldier's Joy)" [Live] – 1:20

== Personnel ==
The Byrds

- Roger McGuinn – guitar, Moog synthesizer, vocals
- Clarence White – guitar, mandolin, vocals
- Skip Battin – electric bass, vocals
- Gene Parsons – drums, guitar, harmonica, vocals

Additional personnel

- Gram Parsons – backing vocal on "All the Things"
- Terry Melcher – piano on "All the Things" and "Truck Stop Girl"
- Byron Berline – fiddle on "You All Look Alike"
- Sneaky Pete Kleinow – pedal steel guitar on "Yesterday's Train"

== Release history ==
Date	Label	Format	Country	Catalog	Notes
September 14, 1970	Columbia	LP	US	G 30127	Original release.
November 13, 1970	CBS	LP	UK	S 64095	Original release.
1990	Columbia	CD	US	CGK 30127	Original CD release.
1993	Columbia	CD	UK	COL 468179	
1998	Mobile Fidelity Sound Lab	CD	UK	UDCD 722	
February 22, 2000	Columbia/Legacy	CD	US	C2K 65847	(Untitled)/(Unissued) reissue containing a bonus disc and the remastered album.
February 22, 2000	Columbia/Legacy	CD	UK	COL 4950772	(Untitled)/(Unissued) reissue containing a bonus disc and the remastered album.
2002	Simply Vinyl	LP	UK	SVLP 381	Triple LP featuring the remastered album and fifteen bonus tracks.
2003	Sony	CD	Japan	MHCP-103	Reissue of the (Untitled)/(Unissued) release in a replica gatefold LP sleeve.

== Bibliography ==
- Rogan, Johnny, The Byrds: Timeless Flight Revisited, Rogan House, 1998, ISBN 0-9529540-1-X
- Hjort, Christopher, So You Want To Be A Rock 'n' Roll Star: The Byrds Day-By-Day (1965–1973), Jawbone Press, 2008, ISBN 1-906002-15-0.
