= Colden Auditorium =

Coordinates: 40.737854°N 73.815746°W

Colden Auditorium is a 2,085-seat concert hall located on the campus of Queens College in Flushing, Queens, New York City. The auditorium is named after Charles S. Colden, founder of Queens College. It was built in 1961 and designed by the architectural firm Fellheimer & Wagner.
