= Ballad of Easy Rider =

1969 single by Roger McGuinn

Song by Roger McGuinn

from the album Easy Rider
- Released: August 1969
- Recorded: February 1969
- Studio: Columbia Studios, Hollywood, CA
- Genre: Folk rock, country rock
- Length: 2:15
- Label: ABC-Dunhill
- Songwriters: Roger McGuinn; Bob Dylan (uncredited)

"Ballad of Easy Rider" is a song written by Roger McGuinn, with input from Bob Dylan (although Dylan is not credited as a co-writer), for the 1969 film Easy Rider. The song was initially released in August 1969 on the Easy Rider soundtrack album as a Roger McGuinn solo performance. It was later issued in an alternative version as a single by McGuinn's band the Byrds on October 1, 1969. Senior editor for Rolling Stone magazine, David Fricke, has described the song as perfectly capturing the social mood of late 1969 and highlighting "the weary blues and dashed expectations of a decade's worth of social insurrection".

== Roger McGuinn's version ==
The star and script writer of Easy Rider, Peter Fonda, had initially intended to use Bob Dylan's song "It's Alright, Ma (I'm Only Bleeding)" in the film, but after failing to license the track, Fonda asked Roger McGuinn of the Byrds to record a cover version of the song instead. Fonda also wanted Dylan to write the film's theme song, but Dylan declined, quickly scribbling the lines, "The river flows, it flows to the sea/Wherever that river goes, that's where I want to be/Flow, river, flow" on a napkin and telling Fonda to "give this to McGuinn. He'll know what to do with it." The lyric fragment was dutifully passed on to McGuinn, who took the lines and expanded upon them with his own lyrical and musical contributions to produce the finished song.

When Dylan saw a private screening of Easy Rider and realised that he had been credited as co-writer of the film's theme song, he telephoned McGuinn and demanded that his name be removed from both the film's closing credits and all subsequent releases of the song. McGuinn has theorised in interviews that Dylan disowned the song because "he didn't like the movie that much. He didn't like the ending. He wanted to see the truck blow up in order to get poetic justice. He didn't seem to understand Peter Fonda's anti-hero concept." Other critics have speculated that Dylan's reason for insisting his co-writing credit be removed was the belief that his name was being exploited to boost the film's street credibility.

The version of "Ballad of Easy Rider" used in the film and included on the Easy Rider soundtrack album is listed as a solo performance by McGuinn and features the singer accompanying himself on acoustic guitar, with fellow Byrd Gene Parsons playing harmonica. This McGuinn solo version is a completely different take from the version that McGuinn's band the Byrds later released as a single and included on their Ballad of Easy Rider album.

In the 21st century, McGuinn continues to perform the song during his solo concerts and consequently a recording of it appears on his 2007 live album, Live from Spain.

== The Byrds' version ==
"Ballad of Easy Rider"
- 1969 Norwegian picture sleeve.

Single by The Byrds

from the album Ballad of Easy Rider
- B-side: "Oil in My Lamp"; "Wasn't Born to Follow"
- Released: October 1, 1969
- Recorded: June 18, 1969
- Studio: Columbia Studios, Hollywood, CA
- Genre: Country rock
- Length: 2:01
- Label: Columbia
- Songwriters: Roger McGuinn; Bob Dylan (uncredited)
- Producer: Terry Melcher

The Byrds singles chronology
"Wasn't Born to Follow" (1969)	"Ballad of Easy Rider" (1969)	"Jesus Is Just Alright" (1969)

The Byrds' version of the song was recorded on June 18, 1969, and is performed at a quicker tempo than the soundtrack version. The song was also lengthened by producer Terry Melcher by editing a copy of the first verse onto the end of the second, effectively creating a third verse. In addition, Melcher added an orchestral overdub to the track in an attempt to emulate recent hit singles like Glen Campbell's "Gentle on My Mind" and Harry Nilsson's "Everybody's Talkin'".

As recording sessions for the Byrds' eighth studio album continued, interest in the band mounted as a result of their involvement with the Easy Rider film, leading McGuinn to announce in interviews that the band's next album would be titled Captain America, in honor of Peter Fonda's character in the film. However, this idea was discarded and ultimately the song "Ballad of Easy Rider" gave the new Byrds' album its title.

The single was issued in America on October 1, 1969, and reached number 65 on the Billboard Hot 100. It also became a number 21 hit in the FIMI National Charts in Italy. Although the single was issued in most international territories, it was not released in the United Kingdom.

The B-side of the Byrds' single was the traditional song "Oil in My Lamp", although there are copies of the single known to exist with the Goffin-King song "Wasn't Born to Follow" on the B-side instead. The Byrds' recording of "Wasn't Born to Follow" first appeared on their 1968 album, The Notorious Byrd Brothers, but since it had been featured prominently in Easy Rider, Columbia Records saw fit to include the song on some copies of "Ballad of Easy Rider". CBS Records in the United Kingdom went a step further by reissuing "Wasn't Born to Follow" as the A-side of a single in September 1969, in the hopes that it might provide the Byrds with a fluke hit (although it failed to chart).

"Ballad of Easy Rider" was first introduced into the Byrds' live concert repertoire during February 1969 and would go on to be performed relatively frequently throughout the rest of the year and into 1970. However, the song was played only rarely between 1971 and the band's break-up in 1973. In addition to its appearance on the Ballad of Easy Rider album, the song can also be found on several Byrds' compilations, including The Best of The Byrds: Greatest Hits, Volume II, History of The Byrds, The Very Best of The Byrds, and The Essential Byrds.

An extended, alternate mix of the song, featuring more prominent percussion and Clarence White's lead guitar solo (which had been edited out of the version found on the album), was included as a bonus track on the 1997 Columbia/Legacy reissue of Ballad of Easy Rider. In addition, a live performance of the song, recorded at the Felt Forum in New York City on March 1, 1970, was included as a bonus track on the remastered (Untitled) album in 2000.

== Cover versions ==
"Ballad of Easy Rider" has been covered by the British folk rock band Fairport Convention and their version of the song was included as a bonus track on the 2003 re-release of the band's 1969 album, Unhalfbricking.

A live cover by Tom Petty and the Heartbreakers from 1987, which the band dedicated to River Phoenix, was featured on the deluxe edition of their career-spanning set, The Live Anthology.
