= Oil in My Lamp =

Traditional Christian hymn

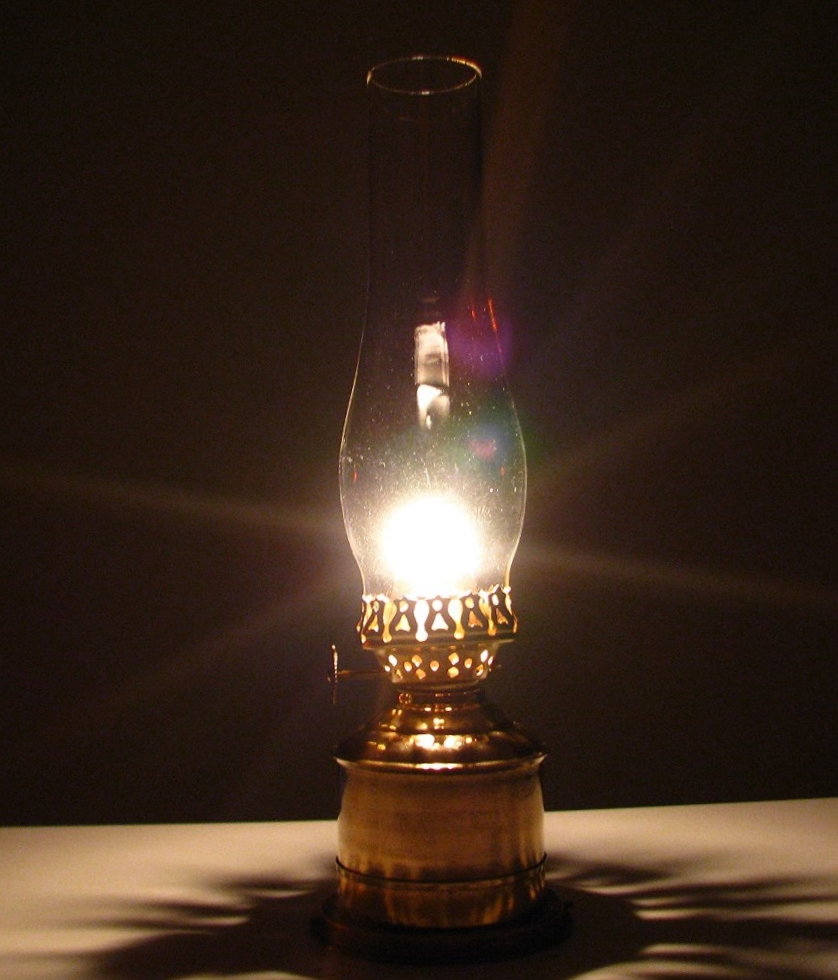
- An example of a burning Oil lamp.

Song
- Language: English
- Genre: Gospel
- Lyricist(s): A. Sevison

"Oil in My Lamp", also known as "Give Me Oil in My Lamp" and "Sing Hosanna", is a Christian hymn based on the Parable of the Ten Virgins. The song has been recorded many times and was a hit in Jamaica in 1964 for Eric "Monty" Morris, as well as appearing on The Byrds' 1969 album Ballad of Easy Rider, and also as a single (on the B side of Ballad of Easy Rider, Columbia 44990).

== Lyrics ==
Verse:
Give me oil in my lamp,
Keep me burning,
Give me oil in my lamp, I pray!
Give me oil in my lamp,
Keep me burning,
Keep me burning
Till the break of day.

Chorus:
Sing hosanna! Sing hosanna!
Sing hosanna to the King of kings!
Sing hosanna! Sing hosanna!
Sing hosanna to the King!

The song is sung in verse-chorus format; subsequent verses replace "oil in my lamp" with a different request, with the verb "burning" replaced with an appropriate verb for the request. Thus the second verse runs: "Give me joy in my heart, Keep me singing, Give me joy in my heart, I pray (etc.)", continuing with a third verse beginning "Give me peace in my heart, Keep me resting" and so on.

== Cultural references ==
=== Football ===
The melody has been used in football chants in the United Kingdom. For example, fans both of Rangers and of the England national team have chanted "No surrender to the IRA" to it.
