= Ballad of Easy Rider (album) =

Studio album by the Byrds
- Released: November 10, 1969
- Recorded: June 17 – August 26, 1969
- Studios: Columbia, Hollywood
- Genres: Rock; country rock
- Length: 33:55
- Label: Columbia
- Producer: Terry Melcher

The Byrds chronology
Preflyte (1969)	Ballad of Easy Rider (1969)	(Untitled) (1970)

Singles from Ballad of Easy Rider
- 1. "Ballad of Easy Rider" Released: October 1, 1969; 2. "Jesus Is Just Alright" Released: December 15, 1969

Ballad of Easy Rider is the eighth album by the American rock band the Byrds and was released in November 1969 on Columbia Records. The album was named after the song "Ballad of Easy Rider", which had been written by the Byrds' guitarist and singer, Roger McGuinn (with help from Bob Dylan) as the theme song for the 1969 film Easy Rider. The title was also chosen in an attempt to capitalize on the commercial success of the film, although the majority of the music on the album had no connection with it. Nonetheless, the association with Easy Rider heightened the Byrds' public profile and resulted in Ballad of Easy Rider becoming the band's highest charting album for two years in the U.S.

The album peaked at number 36 on the Billboard Top LPs chart and number 41 on the UK Albums Chart. The title track was released as a preceding single in October 1969, achieving moderate success on the Billboard Hot 100 chart. A second single taken from the album, "Jesus Is Just Alright", was released in December 1969 but only managed to reach number 97 on the Billboard Hot 100.

The album was the second to be recorded by the Roger McGuinn, Clarence White, Gene Parsons and John York line-up of the Byrds, although York would be fired shortly after its completion. Upon release, Ballad of Easy Rider was met with mixed reviews but is today regarded as one of the band's stronger albums from the latter half of their career.

== Background and Easy Rider film ==
Recording sessions for Ballad of Easy Rider were produced by Terry Melcher, who had also worked as the Byrds' producer during 1965, on their Mr. Tambourine Man and Turn! Turn! Turn! albums. The band decided to work with Melcher again as a result of their dissatisfaction with Bob Johnston's production on their previous album, Dr. Byrds & Mr. Hyde, and on their recent single, "Lay Lady Lay". Melcher was happy to accept the band's invitation to produce the album, but his one stipulation was that he would also take on management duties for the Byrds, not wishing for a repeat of the conflict he had experienced with Jim Dickson, the group's original manager, in 1965. Melcher's return to the producer's chair began an association with the band that would last until Byrdmaniax in 1971, much longer than his first tenure as the Byrds' producer.

Ballad of Easy Rider
An excerpt from the Byrds' recording of "Ballad of Easy Rider", which was written as the theme tune for the 1969 counterculture film Easy Rider. Although primarily penned by Roger McGuinn, the song did feature uncredited songwriting contributions from Bob Dylan.

In early 1969, the script writer and leading actor of Easy Rider, Peter Fonda, asked Bob Dylan to compose a theme song for the film. Dylan declined, but as a consolation he offered the lines, "The river flows, it flows to the sea/Wherever that river goes, that's where I want to be/Flow, river, flow"—which he hurriedly scribbled onto a napkin, telling Fonda to "give that to McGuinn." The fragment was dutifully passed on to Roger McGuinn, the Byrds' lead guitarist, who added his own lyrical and musical contributions to complete the song, which he titled "Ballad of Easy Rider".

After seeing a private screening of Easy Rider and realizing that he had been named as co-writer of the film's theme song, Dylan demanded that his writing credit be removed, leading McGuinn to theorize in later years that Dylan had disliked the film's ending and anti-hero motif. In 2000, McGuinn recounted to Jud Cost the story of how Dylan disowned credit for the song: "I got a call from Dylan at three o'clock in the morning going 'What's this? I don't want this credit. Take it off.'" Another possible reason for Dylan insisting that his name be removed from the song's credits may have been a suspicion that his name was being exploited to boost the film's credibility.

Two versions of the song "Ballad of Easy Rider" were released. The first was the version included on the Easy Rider soundtrack album, which was listed as a solo performance by McGuinn, although it also featured fellow Byrd Gene Parsons on harmonica. The second was the recording by the Byrds, which was included on the Ballad of Easy Rider album and released as a single. The version of the song found on the soundtrack album and used in the film is a completely different recording to the one released by the Byrds.

As recording sessions for the Ballad of Easy Rider album continued throughout July and August 1969, public interest in the band mounted as a result of their involvement with the Easy Rider film. This prompted McGuinn to announce that the title of the Byrds' forthcoming album would be Captain America (the name of Fonda's character in Easy Rider). Ultimately, this working title would not be used and the album was instead named after the film's theme song in an attempt to emphasize the connection with Easy Rider.

Following completion of the album, the Byrds' bass player, John York, was asked to leave the band in September 1969. York had become increasingly disenchanted with his position in the Byrds, and had been vocal about his reluctance to perform material that had been written and recorded before he had joined the band, believing it was spurious of him to do so. The rest of the Byrds had begun to doubt York's commitment and so a consensus was reached among the other three members that York should be fired. He was replaced, at the suggestion of drummer Gene Parsons and lead guitarist Clarence White, by Skip Battin, a freelance session musician and one-time member of the duo Skip & Flip.

== Music ==
The album opens with the McGuinn and Dylan penned title track, which is performed at a substantially quicker tempo than McGuinn's solo version from the Easy Rider soundtrack. The Byrds' version of the song also features the addition of an orchestra, which had been added by Melcher in an attempt to emulate the then-recent hit singles "Gentle on My Mind" by Glen Campbell and "Everybody's Talkin'" by Harry Nilsson. "Ballad of Easy Rider" was McGuinn's only songwriting contribution to the Ballad of Easy Rider album, due to his being preoccupied with composing music for a country rock adaptation of Henrik Ibsen's Peer Gynt, which was anagrammatically re-titled as Gene Tryp.

The remaining ten tracks on Ballad of Easy Rider mostly consisted of cover versions and interpretations of traditional material. Among these non-original songs was a cover of Dylan's "It's All Over Now, Baby Blue", which the band had attempted to record twice before in June and August 1965, during the sessions for their second album, Turn! Turn! Turn!. These earlier recordings had gone unreleased at the time and McGuinn decided to revisit the composition in 1969, slowing down the tempo and radically altering the arrangement to fashion a more somber and serious version than those recorded in 1965. The Byrds' 1969 rendition of "It's All Over Now, Baby Blue" was released as the B-side of the "Jesus Is Just Alright" single.

Other covers on the album included Woody Guthrie's "Deportee (Plane Wreck at Los Gatos)", a poignant account of a plane crash involving migrant farm workers; the gospel-styled "Jesus Is Just Alright", which went on to influence The Doobie Brothers' hit recording of the song; and Pamela Polland's "Tulsa County Blue", which would become a moderate country hit for Anita Carter in 1971. Although "Tulsa County Blue" had been brought to the album sessions by John York and had also been sung by him in concert, the album version features McGuinn on lead vocals. An outtake recording of "Tulsa County Blue" with York singing was finally released as a bonus track on the 1997 Columbia/Legacy reissue of Ballad of Easy Rider.

Another cover included on the album was "There Must Be Someone (I Can Turn To)", a song principally written by country singer Vern Gosdin, after he returned home one evening to find that his wife had left him and taken their children with her. The final track on the album was a meditation on the July 20, 1969 Apollo 11 Moon landing, titled "Armstrong, Aldrin and Collins", which continued the tradition of ending Byrds' albums on a quirky, tongue-in-cheek note.

The Byrds also recorded a number of traditional songs for the album: the sea shanty "Jack Tarr the Sailor", which McGuinn sang in an approximation of an English accent; a harmony-laden arrangement of the Baptist hymn "Oil in My Lamp"; a rendition of "Way Beyond the Sun", which had been inspired by the song's appearance on the debut album by Pentangle; and a Moog synthesizer dominated version of "Fiddler a Dram". Ultimately, "Way Beyond the Sun" and "Fiddler a Dram" would not be included in the album's final track listing and would remain unreleased until the former appeared on The Byrds box set in 1990, and the latter was included on the 1997 reissue of Ballad of Easy Rider.

The album also featured the John York composition "Fido", a song written about a stray dog that the bass player had encountered in a Kansas City hotel room while on tour. The inclusion of the song made Ballad of Easy Rider the second Byrds' album in a row to feature a paean to a canine companion (the first being Dr. Byrds & Mr. Hyde, which had included the song "Old Blue"). A third song about a dog, "Bugler", would appear on the band's 1971 album, Farther Along. "Fido" is notable for featuring a drum solo, the only example of such a solo on any of the Byrds' studio albums. Drummer Gene Parsons also contributed the song "Gunga Din", which related the story of two separate incidents: the first being the Byrds' appearance at a concert in Central Park where Chuck Berry had been billed to perform but had failed to appear; and the second involving John York and his mother being refused admittance to a restaurant, due to York wearing a leather jacket.

== Release and reception ==
Professional ratings
Review scores
Source	Rating
AllMusic	4/5 stars
Robert Christgau	B+
Encyclopedia of Popular Music	3/5 stars
Rolling Stone	(favourable)
Blender	2/5 stars
Rising Storm	(favourable)

Ballad of Easy Rider was released on November 10, 1969 in the United States (catalogue item CS 9942) and January 16, 1970 in the United Kingdom (catalogue item S 63795). The album is notable for being the first Byrds' album to be commercially issued exclusively in stereo in both the U.S. and the UK, although there is some evidence to suggest that mono promo copies of the album were distributed in the United Kingdom. To emphasize the connection between the album and Easy Rider, the back cover of the LP featured liner notes written by Fonda. His musings were written in a free-form, stream of consciousness style and optimistically opined (in a manner reminiscent of the chorus of "Jesus Is Just Alright") that "whoever the Byrds are is just alright. OH YEAH!"

The album peaked at number 36 on the Billboard Top LPs chart, during a chart stay of seventeen weeks, which was a substantial improvement over its predecessor, Dr. Byrds & Mr. Hyde. The reverse was true in the United Kingdom, however, where the album reached number 41 on the UK Albums Chart, while Dr. Byrds & Mr. Hyde had reached number 15. The "Ballad of Easy Rider" single was released ahead of the album on October 1, 1969 (b/w "Oil in My Lamp") and reached number 65 on the Billboard Hot 100 chart. Although this single was issued in most international territories, it was not released in the United Kingdom. A second single taken from the album, "Jesus Is Just Alright", was released on December 15, 1969 and reached number 97 on the Billboard Hot 100, but failed to chart in the UK.

Upon release, the Ballad of Easy Rider album somewhat revived the Byrds' commercial fortunes, giving them their first U.S. Top 40 album since Younger Than Yesterday in 1967. This renewed success was, in part, due to the band's public profile having been increased as a result of their involvement with Easy Rider and the inclusion of three Byrds-related songs on the film's soundtrack album. Columbia Records was eager to capitalize on this newfound popularity and launched an advertising campaign for the Ballad of Easy Rider album, proclaiming "The movie gave you the facts, the Ballad interprets them." However, as Byrds expert Tim Conners has stated on his website, with the exception of the title track, none of the songs on the album had much to do with the film. In fact, the Byrds' biographer Johnny Rogan has remarked that the album cover's sepia-toned photograph of Lemuel Parsons (Gene Parsons' father) sitting astride an archaic 1928 Harley-Davidson could almost be seen as a parody of the film's biker ethos.

The album was met with mixed reviews at the time of its release, with Ed Leimbacher, in the December 1969 issue of Rolling Stone magazine, criticizing the music on the album as "only intermittently successful" and concluding that "the Byrds are still on the wing, but seem a little woozy and wobbly." Todd Selbert, writing in Jazz & Pop magazine, was more positive, describing the album as "Pretty good Byrds—their best effort since the stunning The Notorious Byrd Brothers." In more recent years, music critic Robert Christgau has dismissed Ballad of Easy Rider as "the poorest Byrds album", but also admitted that the album "improves with listening." AllMusic's Mark Deming was more positive: "Ballad of Easy Rider sounds confident and committed where Dr. Byrds & Mr. Hyde often seemed tentative. The band sounds tight, self-assured, and fully in touch with the music's emotional palette, and Clarence White's guitar work is truly a pleasure to hear."

Ballad of Easy Rider was remastered at 20-bit resolution as part of the Columbia/Legacy Byrds series. It was reissued in an expanded form on March 25, 1997 with seven bonus tracks, including the outtakes, "Way Beyond the Sun", "Fiddler a Dram (Moog Experiment)", a rendition of "Tulsa County Blue" with John York singing lead vocals and "Mae Jean Goes to Hollywood"; written by the then little-known Jackson Browne.

== Track listing ==
=== Side one ===
1. "Ballad of Easy Rider" (Roger McGuinn, Bob Dylan) – 2:01
  - Bob Dylan is not officially credited as a songwriter.
2. "Fido" (John York) – 2:40
3. "Oil in My Lamp" (traditional, arranged Gene Parsons, Clarence White) – 3:13
4. "Tulsa County Blue" [aka "Tulsa County"] (Pamela Polland) – 2:49
5. "Jack Tarr the Sailor" (traditional, arranged Roger McGuinn) – 3:31

=== Side two ===
1. "Jesus Is Just Alright" (Arthur Reid Reynolds) – 2:10
2. "It's All Over Now, Baby Blue" (Bob Dylan) – 4:53
3. "There Must Be Someone" (Vern Gosdin, Cathy Gosdin, Rex Gosdin) – 3:29
4. "Gunga Din" (Gene Parsons) – 3:03
5. "Deportee (Plane Wreck at Los Gatos)" (Woody Guthrie, Martin Hoffman) – 3:50
6. "Armstrong, Aldrin and Collins" (Zeke Manners, Scott Seely) – 1:41

=== 1997 reissue bonus tracks ===
12. "Way Beyond the Sun" (traditional, arranged Roger McGuinn) – 2:57
13. "Mae Jean Goes to Hollywood" (Jackson Browne) – 2:44
14. "Oil in My Lamp" [Alternate Version] (traditional, arranged Gene Parsons, Clarence White) – 2:02
15. "Tulsa County Blue" [Alternate Version] (Pamela Polland) – 3:39
16. "Fiddler a Dram (Moog Experiment)" (traditional, arranged Roger McGuinn) – 3:10
17. "Ballad of Easy Rider" [Long Version] (Roger McGuinn, Bob Dylan) – 2:26
18. "Build It Up" [Instrumental] (Clarence White, Gene Parsons) – 5:34
  - Ends at 2:35; at 3:35 begins "Radio Spot: Ballad of Easy Rider Album #1", which ends at 4:30; at 4:38 begins "Radio Spot: Ballad of Easy Rider Album #2".

== Personnel ==
The Byrds

- Roger McGuinn – guitar, vocals; Moog synthesizer and banjo on 1997 bonus track "Fiddler a Dram (Moog Experiment)"
- Clarence White – lead guitar, vocals
- John York – electric bass, vocals
- Gene Parsons – drums, guitar, banjo, vocals

Additional personnel

- Byron Berline – fiddle on "Tulsa County Blue" (and on 1997 bonus track "Mae Jean Goes to Hollywood")
- Glen D. Hardin – organ on "Gunga Din"
- Terry Melcher – backing vocal on "It's All Over Now, Baby Blue"
- string section on "Ballad Of Easy Rider" and "Jesus Is Just Alright"

== Release history ==
Date	Label	Format	Country	Catalog	Notes
November 10, 1969	Columbia	LP	US	CS 9942	Original release.
January 16, 1970	CBS	LP	UK	S 63795	Original release.
1982	Embassy	LP	UK	EMB 31956	
1989	Columbia	CD	US	CK 9942	Original CD release.
March 25, 1997	Columbia/Legacy	CD	US	CK 65114	Reissue containing seven bonus tracks and the remastered stereo album.
March 25, 1997	Columbia/Legacy	CD	UK	COL 486754	Reissue containing seven bonus tracks and the remastered stereo album.
2003	Sony	CD	Japan	MHCP-102	Reissue containing seven bonus tracks and the remastered album in a replica LP sleeve.

== Bibliography ==
- Rogan, Johnny, The Byrds: Timeless Flight Revisited, Rogan House, 1998, ISBN 0-9529540-1-X
- Hjort, Christopher, So You Want To Be A Rock 'n' Roll Star: The Byrds Day-By-Day (1965-1973), Jawbone Press, 2008, ISBN 1-906002-15-0.
