= Wasn't Born to Follow =

1968 song by The Byrds

- German single cover

Single by The Byrds

from the album The Notorious Byrd Brothers
- B-side: "Child of the Universe" (UK); "Ballad of Easy Rider" (Germany)
- Released: September 26, 1969
- Recorded: November 30, 1967
- Studio: Columbia Studios, Hollywood, CA
- Genre: Country rock, psychedelic rock
- Length: 2:04
- Label: CBS
- Songwriters: Gerry Goffin, Carole King
- Producer: Gary Usher

The Byrds singles chronology
"Lay Lady Lay" (1969)	"Wasn't Born to Follow" (1969)	"Ballad of Easy Rider" (1969)

Audio
- "Wasn't Born to Follow" by the Byrds on YouTube

"I Wasn't Born to Follow"

Song by The City

from the album Now That Everything's Been Said
- Released: 1969
- Recorded: February 1969
- Genre: Soft rock
- Length: 3:43
- Label: Ode Records
- Songwriters: Gerry Goffin, Carole King
- Producer: Lou Adler

"Wasn't Born to Follow", also known as "I Wasn't Born to Follow", is a song written by Gerry Goffin and Carole King. Goffin wrote the lyrics and King provided the music. The song was first recorded by the Byrds for their 1968 album The Notorious Byrd Brothers. King's short-lived band The City also recorded the song for their 1968 album Now That Everything's Been Said. It has also been covered by other artists, including the Monkees, the Lemon Pipers, Dusty Springfield, and as a solo recording by King. The Byrds recording was featured in the 1969 film Easy Rider and was released as a single in the UK and Germany the same year.

== Lyrics and music ==
The lyrics of "Wasn't Born to Follow" celebrate the freedom that hippies enjoyed in the late 1960s. They express the need for escape and independence. Music critic Johnny Rogan describes the lyrics as an "evocation of pastoral freedom and the implicit desire to escape from the restrictions of conventional society." Music professor James E. Perone describes the singer as "a rugged individualist at one with nature." The song uses a country rock melody, which Perone regards as an authentic contribution to the country rock genre that was just getting started in the late 1960s.

== The Byrds version ==
Byrds producer Gary Usher acquired "Wasn't Born to Follow" before it was released or recorded by anyone else through his connections at the Screen Gems production company and his personal acquaintance with Carole King. The Byrds recorded the song on November 30, 1967, as one of the last songs recorded in the sessions for The Notorious Byrd Brothers album. The band's lead guitarist Roger McGuinn sings the lead vocal, and the band are augmented by Red Rhodes on pedal steel guitar and Clarence White on guitar. As Byrds' drummer Michael Clarke had left the group during the recording of the album, Jim Gordon, who also performed on The City's version, plays drums. The album recording ends with the sound of a door slamming.

Rogan points out that the Byrds revamped King's melody and also added some "starting" effects, including the juxtaposition of White's country-style guitar playing and "a cascade of exotic phrasing." According to Allmusic critic Thomas Ward, the Byrds play the song "with supreme modesty" in recognition of "beauty of the purest forms of American music." Perone regards the Byrds' recording as the "definitive version of the song." Perone suggests that "Wasn't Born to Follow" takes on extra poignancy on the album due to its placement right after the anti-military draft song "Draft Morning," suggesting that "the singer was not born to follow the sheep (draftees) into slaughter."

While McGuinn was writing the theme song for the film Easy Rider, its star and producer Peter Fonda also wanted to include two songs from The Notorious Byrd Brothers in the film ("Wasn't Born to Follow" and "Draft Morning"). In the end, only "Wasn't Born to Follow" was used, accompanying the two bikers riding through the mountains and taking a hitchhiker to a commune. The song was used in the film to express "the search for America."

CBS Records in the United Kingdom took advantage of the song's prominent use in the film and released "Wasn't Born to Follow" as a single on September 26, 1969, in the unfulfilled hope of scoring a fluke hit. It was also issued as a single in Germany. "Wasn't Born to Follow" was not released as the A-side of a single in the U.S., but it did appear on the B-side of some copies of the single release of the title song from the film, "Ballad of Easy Rider".

== Other versions ==
The City recorded the song under the title "I Wasn't Born to Follow" for their 1968 album Now That Everything's Been Said. King sang the lead vocals and played keyboards. Danny Kortchmar played guitar, Charles Larkey played bass and Gordon played drums with Lou Adler producing. The City's version is longer and more meandering than the Byrds' version. Perone describes some of King's piano playing as gospel-influenced." According to AllMusic critic Tim Sendra, as a vocalist King is "able to wrench all the emotions she can ... with her expressive amateurism."

King recorded a solo version of "Wasn't Born to Follow" for her 1980 album Pearls: Songs of Goffin and King. Perone describes this version as being more country music influenced than either the Byrds' or The City's versions. Perone also praises her multitracked vocal harmonies.

The psychedelic pop band the Lemon Pipers recorded "Wasn't Born to Follow" on their 1968 album Jungle Marmalade. Dusty Springfield recorded the song during the sessions for her See All Her Faces album, although it was not included on that LP and had to wait until the 1990s to be released on compilation albums. Paul Howes and Petula Clark describe Springfield's version as being similar to King's, with its "undulating rhythm and urgent delivery." But they note that she changes the gender of the pronouns of the final verse from female to male. The Monkees covered the song on their 2016 album Good Times! in a version that Will Hodgkinson of The Sunday Times said "rolls along with mellow ease." The recording was begun in 1968 and completed in 2016. English singer-songwriter Beth Orton included a cover of the song as one of three bonus tracks on the deluxe edition of her fifth studio release Sugaring Season, from 2012.

American indie rock band Yo La Tengo released a cover of "Wasn't Born to Follow" as a single in August 2020.
