= Jimmi Seiter =

- Born: James Duke Seiter; May 2, 1945 (age 81); St. Louis, Missouri United States
- Genres: Rock, R&B
- Occupations: Musician, Road manager, Percussionist, Associate producer, Architect
- Instruments: Drums, percussion

Jimmi Seiter (born James Duke Seiter; May 2, 1945 in St. Louis, Missouri) is an American musician, tour manager, artist manager, music producer, sound designer, stage producer and architect.

He worked as road manager, associate producer and touring percussionist for The Byrds, and as road manager for The Flying Burrito Brothers alongside Gram Parsons during the late 1960s and early 1970s.

== Early life ==
Seiter developed an interest in music during childhood while growing up in St Louis. With encouragement from his parents and two brothers, he began playing drums at an early age. His first exposure to live performance soon followed with school recitals on the Admiral cruise boats on the Mississippi in the early 1950s.

During high school, he performed with several local bands and was influenced by rock and roll music and artists such as Bill Haley, Sam Cooke, Ricky Nelson, and Elvis Presley. Seiter's elder brother John Seiter achieved success as a drummer, recording with Spanky and Our Gang in 1967.

During high school, Seiter joined his first rock band with two high school friends who played bass guitar and guitar. With the addition of a horn player, they began performing at special events and local clubs. The band later added a female vocalist, Pat Shannahan, and became known as Vince Arter and the High-5s. During this period, the band met Ike Turner, who introduced them to R&B music alongside members of his backing band. They later performed between Turner's headline shows on the night club circuit.

After graduating from high school, Seiter briefly served in the US Navy before studying architecture and music. He later moved to California where he worked in architectural design.

While living in Los Angeles, Seiter became involved in stage production for singer Dobie Gray and later worked as a roadie for The Byrds.

Seiter later assisted on tours with The Byrds, in Northern California and Texas, putting his architectural career on hold.

== 1970s ==
After briefly working with The Flying Burrito Brothers and Gram Parsons in 1969, Seiter returned to working full-time with The Byrds as road manager at the request of guitarist Clarence White. Byrds publicist Derek Taylor later referred to him as a "manager by proxy".

Seiter performed as an uncredited percussionist on several recordings from The Byrds' mid-to-late period. Producer Terry Melcher encouraged him to seek acknowledgment for his contributions, and both Melcher and White incorporated his drumming into the band's live performances.

By 1973, internal disagreements within The Byrds had strained relationships among band members. Seiter left the group during this period. Shortly afterward, drummer Gene Parsons and bassist Skip Battin were dismissed, and Clarence White departed following Roger McGuinn efforts to reunite the original Byrds lineup for a reunion album.

After leaving The Byrds, Seiter worked with artists including Alice Cooper, Flo & Eddie, Rocky Burnette, and David Cassidy. He later expanded his career into studio design and construction management, and collaborated on several recording projects with producer Terry Melcher.

== Recent years ==
Seiter has worked on large-scale events and installations around the world, including the L.A. Olympics ceremonies, six subsequent Olympics, theme parks and the construction of a city in Kazakhstan. He lated lived in Macau, China due to his involvement in planning for the Beijing 2008 Olympic Games.

In August 2012, Seiter published The Byrds - My Way (Volume 1), the first volume of a series about his experience working with The Byrds and The Flying Burrito Brothers.
