= Jacques Levy =

Musical artist (1935–2004)

Background information
- Born: July 29, 1935; New York City, U.S.
- Died: September 30, 2004 (aged 69) New York City, U.S.
- Occupations: Theatre director, songwriter

Jacques Levy (July 29, 1935 – September 30, 2004) was an American songwriter, theatre director and clinical psychologist.

== Early life and education ==
Levy was born in New York City in 1935 and graduated from the City College of New York in 1956. He then received his M.A. (1958) and Ph.D. (1961) in psychology from Michigan State University and was certified by the Menninger Institute for Psychoanalysis in Topeka, Kansas. After returning to New York, he practiced as a clinical psychologist while pursuing his avocation in the city's experimental theatre scene.

== Career ==
In 1965, Levy directed Sam Shepard's play Red Cross at the Judson Poets Theater, New York City. The following year he directed two of the short plays in Jean-Claude van Itallie's America Hurrah. In 1969, Levy directed the successful off-Broadway erotic revue Oh! Calcutta!

During this period, Levy approached Roger McGuinn of The Byrds to collaborate on Gene Tryp, a project inspired by Henrik Ibsen's Peer Gynt. While development of the musical stalled (a revised iteration was eventually performed at Colgate University in 1993), one song, "Chestnut Mare," became the single released from the album (Untitled) in 1970. Although it only peaked at #121 in the United States, the song reached #19 in the United Kingdom and ultimately became an enduring FM radio staple in America. Many further Levy-McGuinn songs appeared on Byrds and McGuinn albums during the 1970s and on McGuinn, Clark & Hillman albums in the late 1970s. In 1973, Levy and Van Itallie reunited for Mystery Play, which starred Judd Hirsch and ran for 14 performances off-Broadway at the Cherry Lane Theatre. The songwriting partnership between McGuinn and Levy endured until 1977's Thunderbyrd, a McGuinn solo album.

In the mid-seventies, Levy met Bob Dylan through McGuinn. Shortly thereafter, the two collaborated on "Isis" and another six songs which appeared on Dylan's 1976 album Desire. These included "Hurricane" (about imprisoned boxer Rubin "Hurricane" Carter) and "Joey" (an ode to the American Mafia gangster and hitman Joe Gallo). Levy was the stage director of both the 1975 and 1976 legs of Dylan's Rolling Thunder Revue.

In 1980, he staged Stephen Poliakoff's play American Days at Manhattan Theatre Club, which featured David Blue, one of the performers in the Rolling Thunder Revue. Frank Rich in his review for The New York Times wrote: "Jacques Levy, the director, matches the crackling energy of the text blow for blow." In 1983 he staged Doonesbury: A Musical Comedy (based on Garry Trudeau's comic strip Doonesbury) on Broadway. In 1988 he provided the lyrics for the stage musical of the film Fame. Later came Marat/Sade (1994), Bus Stop (1997), and Brecht on Brecht (2000, in New York City).

In the early 1990s he taught acting at Hunter College in Manhattan. From 1993 until his death from cancer in 2004, he was a professor of English and director of the drama program at Colgate University in upstate New York.

== Personal life ==
He had two children, Maya and Julien, with his wife Claudia.

== Theatrical credits ==
Broadway

- Oh! Calcutta! (1969) – revue – director
- Oh! Calcutta! (1976 revival) – revue – director and contributing songwriter
- Almost an Eagle (1982) – play – director
- Doonesbury: A Musical Comedy (1983) – musical – director

Note: Fame, the stage musical, was not presented on Broadway, but has been playing in London's West End since 1995.

Off Broadway

- America Hurrah (1966) – play – director – Pocket Theatre – American premiere
- Mystery Play (1973) – play – director – Cherry Lane Theatre – American premiere
- American Days (1980) – play – director – Manhattan Theatre Club – American premiere
- TRYP (2005) – play – dramaturge
