= The World Turns All Around Her =

Song by the Byrds

from the album Turn! Turn! Turn!
- Released: December 6, 1965
- Recorded: August 28, 1965
- Studio: Columbia, Hollywood, California
- Genre: Folk rock
- Length: 2:13
- Label: Columbia
- Songwriter: Gene Clark
- Producer: Terry Melcher

"The World Turns All Around Her" is a song written by Gene Clark that was first recorded by the Byrds for their second album Turn! Turn! Turn! (1965).

== Music and lyrics ==
"The World Turns All Around Her" is one of several songs written by Clark with lyrics about broken love and the pain of teenage romance. The song has been described as being about "the unrealized potential of womanhood." According to music critic Johnny Rogan, the theme of the song is "understanding through loss." The singer has lost his girlfriend, but doesn't feel jealous or resentful. Rather than expressing the cliche of asking her new boyfriend to care for his ex-girlfriend, he instead asks that he help her realize her potential. The song ends with the singer suggesting that the new boyfriend may eventually recognize that he too must set her free in order for her to become all that she can be.

Despite the sad and philosophical content, the music is set to a rock beat. Byrds biographer Christopher Hjort described the tune as one of Clark's "catchiest." Rolling Stone Album Guide contributor Rob Sheffield described the music as being "morosely uptempo." Rogan feels that applying this music to "a plaintive love song" reinforces the impact of the lyrics. Clark was reportedly pleased with the effect, stating "I liked the song very much. I thought the fast, electric treatment worked out OK."

Something Else! contributor Beverly Paterson described the music as having "sparkling sheen and needle-sharp hooks." Rogan praised the vocal harmonies but felt that the instrument playing was a little too loose.

== Recording ==
"The World Turns All Around Her" was recorded on August 28, 1965, at Columbia Recording Studio A in Hollywood, California. The Byrds also recorded "She Don't Care About Time" at that session.

== Reception ==
AllMusic critic Richie Unterberger describes "The World Turns All Around Her" as a "strong composition." Clark biographer John Einarson described it as "indicative of [Clark's] expanding poetic vision" and one of the highlights of Turn! Turn! Turn!. Pitchfork contributor Joe Tangari describes it as "exquisite pop" and Rolling Stone contributor Billy Altman described it as "thoughtful, original pop." Writer Jeremy Simmonds described it as a "timeless number."

"The World Turns All Around Her" appeared on several Byrds' compilation albums, including The Byrds (1990 box set), The Very Best of The Byrds (1997), and The Essential Byrds (2003).

== Other versions ==
The Byrds recorded an alternate mix of "The World Turns All Around Her" that incorporated bongo drums. This version was included as a bonus track on the 1996 CD release of Turn! Turn! Turn!.

"The World Turns All Around Her" has been recorded by several artists including Skydiggers and Johnny Winter.
