= The Times They Are a-Changin' (song) =

1965 single by Bob Dylan

- Swedish picture sleeve

Single by Bob Dylan

from the album The Times They Are a-Changin'
- B-side: "Honey, Just Allow Me One More Chance"
- Released: March 8, 1965
- Recorded: October 24, 1963
- Studio: Columbia Recording, New York City
- Genre: Folk
- Length: 3:15
- Label: Columbia
- Songwriter: Bob Dylan
- Producer: Tom Wilson

Bob Dylan singles chronology
"Blowin' in the Wind" (1963)	"The Times They Are a-Changin'" (1965)	"Subterranean Homesick Blues" (1965)

"The Times They Are a-Changin'" is a song written by Bob Dylan and released as the title track of his 1964 album of the same name. Dylan wrote it as an anthem of change for the time, influenced by Irish and Scottish ballads. Released as a 45-rpm single in Britain in 1965, it reached number 9 on the UK Singles Chart. The song was not released as a single in the US. In 2025, it was certified Gold by BPI.

The song has influenced people's views about society. Critics have said the lyrics' universality give the song a lasting message of change. According to Dylan's official website, he performed the song 633 times between 1963 and 2009, making it his 23rd most-performed song as of June 2023. The song has been covered by many artists, including Nina Simone; Josephine Baker; the Byrds; the Seekers; Cher; Peter, Paul and Mary; Tracy Chapman; Richie Havens; Simon & Garfunkel; Blackmore's Night; Runrig; the Beach Boys; Joan Baez; Phil Collins; Billy Joel; Bruce Springsteen; Me First and the Gimme Gimmes; Brandi Carlile; and Burl Ives. The song was ranked number 59 on Rolling Stone's 2004 list of the "500 Greatest Songs of All Time".

== Inspiration and composition ==
Bob Dylan, 1963 promo photo by Don Hunstein for The Times They Are a-Changin' in a recording studio.

Dylan appears to have written the song in September and October 1963. He recorded it as a Witmark publishing demo at that time, a version that was later released on The Bootleg Series Volumes 1–3 (Rare & Unreleased) 1961–1991. The song was then recorded at Columbia Studios in New York on October 23 and 24; the latter session yielding the version that became the title song of Dylan's third album. The a- in the song title is an archaic intensifying prefix, as in the British songs "A-Hunting We Will Go" and "Here We Come a-Wassailing", from the 18th and 19th century.

Dylan recalled writing the song as a deliberate attempt to create an anthem of change for the moment. In 1985, he told Cameron Crowe, "This was definitely a song with a purpose. It was influenced of course by the Irish and Scottish ballads ...'Come All Ye Bold Highway Men', 'Come All Ye Tender Hearted Maidens'. I wanted to write a big song, with short concise verses that piled up on each other in a hypnotic way. The civil rights movement and the folk music movement were pretty close for a while and allied together at that time."

Dylan biographer Clinton Heylin wrote that musician Tony Glover stopped by Dylan's apartment in September 1963, picked up a page of the song Dylan was working on, and read a line from it: "Come senators, congressmen, please heed the call." Glover asked, "What is this shit, man?" Dylan shrugged and replied, "Well, you know, it seems to be what the people want to hear."

Critic Michael Gray called it "the archetypal protest song." Gray commented, "Dylan's aim was to ride upon the unvoiced sentiment of a mass public—to give that inchoate sentiment an anthem and give its clamour an outlet. He succeeded, but the language of the song is nevertheless imprecisely and very generally directed." Gray suggested that the song has been made obsolete by the very changes that it predicted and hence was politically out of date almost as soon as it was written.

Literary critic Christopher Ricks suggested that "the song transcends the political preoccupations of the time in which it was written". Ricks argued in 2003 that Dylan was still performing the song, and when he sang "Your sons and your daughters / Are beyond your command", he "sang inescapably with the accents not of a son, no longer perhaps primarily a parent, but with the attitude of a grandfather." Ricks concluded, "Once upon a time it may have been a matter of urging square people to accept the fact that their children were, you know, hippies. But the capacious urging could then come to mean that ex-hippie parents had better accept that their children look like becoming yuppies. And then Republicans..."

Critic Andy Gill points out that the song's lyrics echo lines from the Book of Ecclesiastes, which Pete Seeger adapted to create his anthem "Turn, Turn, Turn!". The climactic line about the first later being last, likewise, is a direct scriptural reference to Mark 10:31: "But many that are first shall be last, and the last first."

Less than a month after Dylan recorded the song, President Kennedy was assassinated on November 22, 1963. Dylan told his biographer Anthony Scaduto that he had performed a concert the night after the assassination, and recalled opening the concert with "The Times They Are a-Changin'": "I thought, 'Wow, how can I open with that song? I'll get rocks thrown at me.' But I had to sing it, my whole concert takes off from there. I know I had no understanding of anything. Something had just gone haywire in the country and they were applauding the song. And I couldn't understand why they were clapping, or why I wrote the song. I couldn't understand anything. For me, it was just insane." Later researchers have suggested Dylan may have mistaken the date of his first concert after Kennedy’s assassination. (Note: Dylan historian Ian Woodward looked extensively for a Dylan concert immediately after Kennedy’s assassination. The first concert that he could verify took place on November 26, 1963, at St. Lawrence University, Canton, upper New York State. Woodward suggests that Dylan mistook the date but this was his first concert after Kennedy’s assassination. Woodward, Ian, “Was There A Bob Dylan Concert on 23 November 1963?” Isis magazine, issue 207, pp. 12–16. (2020))

== Charts ==
2026 chart performance for "The Times They Are a-Changin'"
Chart (2026)	Peak position
Israel International Airplay (Media Forest)	20

== Certifications ==
Region	Certification	Certified units/sales
New Zealand (RMNZ)	Platinum	30,000^{‡}
United Kingdom (BPI)	Gold	400,000^{‡}
^{‡} Sales+streaming figures based on certification alone.

== The Byrds' version ==
"The Times They Are a-Changin'"
- 2011 re-release picture sleeve 45-rpm vinyl

Song by the Byrds

from the album Turn! Turn! Turn!
- Released: December 6, 1965
- Recorded: September 1, 1965
- Studio: Columbia, Hollywood, California
- Genre: Folk rock
- Length: 2:18 (album); 1:54 (original)
- Label: Columbia
- Songwriter: Bob Dylan
- Producer: Terry Melcher

"The Times They Are a-Changin'" was one of two Dylan covers that the Byrds included on their second album, Turn! Turn! Turn!, "Lay Down Your Weary Tune" being the other. Like other Dylan compositions that the band had covered, such as "Mr. Tambourine Man" and "All I Really Want to Do", the song was intended to be the A-side of a single. It was sung by bandleader Jim McGuinn and prominently features his signature twelve-string Rickenbacker guitar. The song was often played at concerts surrounding its release.

I remember the Beatles were in the studio for one of them (version of 'The Times They Are a-Changin'). That kinda put a lot of pressure on us.

— Roger McGuinn

George Harrison and Paul McCartney of the Beatles attended the Byrds' recording of the song on September 1, 1965, at Columbia's studios on Sunset Boulevard. Members of the Byrds later reflected that the presence of the two Beatles prevented them from completing the track effectively. Columbia Records originally pressed thousands of cover sleeves for the intended single, but the Byrds' manager, Jim Dickson, asked for the release to be dropped because of the group's dissatisfaction, most vocally expressed by David Crosby; Dickson originally thought the song would have made a strong single. In a 2004 interview, Chris Hillman stated his dislike for the song, suggesting that "we shouldn't have bothered with that song". Another version of the song, recorded in June, is a bonus track on the 1996 reissue. "Turn! Turn! Turn!" ended up becoming the band's third single, reaching number 1 on the U.S. Billboard Hot 100 chart and number 26 on the UK Singles Chart.

The Byrds performed the song on the U.S. television program Hullabaloo, but it failed to make a long-term impact. CBS England issued "The Times They Are a-Changin'" as the lead track of an EP, along with "Set You Free This Time", written by Gene Clark, which was moderately successful. In addition to its appearance on the Byrds' second album, "The Times They Are a-Changin'" is included on several Byrds compilations, including The Byrds' Greatest Hits Volume II, The Very Best of The Byrds, The Byrds, The Essential Byrds, There Is a Season, and The Byrds Play Dylan.

== Later history ==
In January 1984, a young Steve Jobs recited the second verse of "The Times They Are a-Changin'" in his opening of the 1984 Apple shareholders meeting, where he famously unveiled the Macintosh computer for the first time.

The "Dylan Covers Database" listed 436 recordings, including bootlegs, of this song as of October 19, 2009. According to the same database, the song has been recorded in at least 14 other languages, such as Catalan, Czech, Dutch, Finnish, French, German, Hungarian, Italian, Japanese, Norwegian, Polish, Serbian, Spanish, and Swedish.

Hip hop group Public Enemy allude to it in their 2007 Dylan tribute song "Long and Whining Road": "It's been a long and whining road, even though time keeps a-changin' / I'm a bring it all back home".

In 2009, the filmmaker Michael Moore sang the third verse of the song live on The Jay Leno Show after being told that he had to "earn" a clip from his film Capitalism: A Love Story to be shown.

On December 10, 2010, Dylan's hand-written lyrics of the song were sold at auction at Sotheby's, in New York, for $422,500. They were purchased by a hedge fund manager.

The song is included in "The 500 Songs That Shaped Rock and Roll", a permanent exhibit at the Rock and Roll Hall of Fame.

Billy Bragg covered the song but updated the lyrics, singing "Accept it that soon you'll be drenched to the bone/For the climate is obviously changing," and "But the man in the White House says no one's to blame/For the times, they are a-changing back."

A cover of the song by singer Susan Calloway was used in a commercial for the 2022 Stanley Cup Finals. The commercial featured an edited sequence of handoffs of the Stanley Cup between notable former Cup winning players with Calloway's version accompanying.

Nitty Gritty Dirt Band covered the song in 2021 with guest vocals from Jason Isbell, Steve Earle, Rosanne Cash, and the War and Treaty, for their album Dirt Does Dylan. Proceeds from sales of their version were donated to Feeding America.

== Sources ==
- Bjorner, Olof (2002). Olof's Files: A Bob Dylan Performance Guide (Bob Dylan all alone on a shelf). Hardinge Simpole. ISBN 1-84382-024-2.
- Gill, Andy (1999). Classic Bob Dylan: My Back Pages. Carlton. ISBN 1-85868-599-0.
- Gray, Michael (2006). The Bob Dylan Encyclopedia. Continuum International. ISBN 0-8264-6933-7.
- Heylin, Clinton (2003). Bob Dylan: Behind the Shades Revisited. Perennial Currents. ISBN 0-06-052569-X.
- Ricks, Christopher (2003). Dylan's Visions of Sin. Penguin/Viking. ISBN 0-670-80133-X.
- Scaduto, Anthony (2001). Bob Dylan. Helter Skelter, reprint of 1972 edition. ISBN 1-900924-23-4.
- Unterberger, Richie (2002). Turn! Turn! Turn!: The '60s Folk-Rock Revolution. San Francisco: Backbeat Books. ISBN 0-87930-703-X.
