= She Don't Care About Time =

- Japanese picture sleeve

Single by the Byrds
- A-side: "Turn! Turn! Turn!"
- Released: October 1, 1965
- Recorded: August 28, 1965
- Studio: Columbia, Hollywood
- Genre: Folk rock
- Length: 2:28
- Label: Columbia
- Songwriter: Gene Clark
- Producer: Terry Melcher

The Byrds singles chronology
"All I Really Want to Do" (1965)	"Turn! Turn! Turn!" / "She Don't Care About Time" (1965)	"Set You Free This Time" / "It Won't Be Wrong" (1966)

Alternative cover
- Cover art for a 2004 reissue, with "It's All Over Now, Baby Blue"

"She Don't Care About Time" is a song by the American folk rock band the Byrds. It was released on a non-album single as the B-side to "Turn! Turn! Turn!" in October 1965. The song was written by Gene Clark, the Byrds' main songwriter between 1964 and early 1966. "She Don't Care About Time" was recorded during sessions for Turn! Turn! Turn!, the group's second album. The song is on many of the band's hits compilations.

== Composition ==
As was true with the Byrds' first album, the majority of group-penned compositions on "Turn! Turn! Turn!" were written by Gene Clark. The composition's lyrics have been well cited for their complexity by many who have been affiliated with the group. In particular Johnny Rogan stated in his biography Timeless Flight that the elaboration of the lyrics were in anticipation of Clark's later work and were a "fascinating apotheosis in which naturalistic detail and abstraction coalesced". Musically, the recording featured a guitar solo patterned after by Bach's "Jesu, Joy of Man's Desiring". The Byrds' recording of "Mr. Tambourine Man" opens with a similar and distinctive, Bach-inspired guitar riff played by Jim McGuinn.

The previously unreleased first recording of the song appears on The Byrds box set. It is played at a much faster tempo with Clark performing a harmonica solo and McGuinn's guitar playing being more dissonant. Other early versions have been known to feature the group's producer Terry Melcher, playing the piano. Although the track was released as single it was ultimately left off the album, along with the Dylanesque "The Day Walk (Never Before)" (also written by Clark). "The Day Walk (Never Before)" was left to languish in the Columbia tape vaults for more than 20 years.

This was one of two songs that The Beatles' George Harrison cited as inspiration for "If I Needed Someone". Upon the release of the Beatles' Rubber Soul album, he sent a letter to the group's publicist Derek Taylor, stating: "Tell Jim [McGuinn] and David [Crosby] that 'If I Needed Someone' is the riff from 'The Bells Of Rhymney' and the drumming from 'She Don't Care About Time', or my impression of it."

== Reception ==
Since its release, "She Don't Care About Time" has been highly praised by fellow Byrd members. When asked about the recording, McGuinn stated: "I love that song ('She Don't Care About Time'), I really do. I don't know why that never got on. That was for the Turn Turn Turn album, right? I think we had enough stuff already – except that I'm not too happy with the last four cuts of that album." David Crosby and Chris Hillman were also big advocates of the song, praising its importance in many interviews since Clark's death.

Cash Box described it as a "rollicking, hard-driving contagious, teen-angled romancer." AllMusic critic Matthew Greenwald considers it to be "one of the early Byrds' finest records" and that the Bach-inspired guitar lines (from "Joy of Man's Desiring") "took the song to even greater heights". In 2012, Will Levith of Ultimate Classic Rock rated the song as Clark's third best composition, praising McGuinn's Bach-inspired guitar riff and Clark's "introspective lyrics and driving melody".

== Appearances ==
In addition to its appearance on The Byrds' second album as a bonus track, "She Don't Care About Time" also appears on several compilations, including The Original Singles: 1965–1967, Volume 1, The Essential Byrds, History of The Byrds, and the expanded and reissued edition of Never Before. The song is also available on the There Is a Season boxset, which comprises 99 tracks and includes material from each of the band's twelve studio albums, presented in roughly chronological order.

The song was also revisited by Chris Hillman on his Tom Petty produced 2017 album Biding My Time. Hillman told Rolling Stone magazine that it "is one of my favorite Gene Clark compositions".
