= My Back Pages =

1964 song by Bob Dylan

Song by Bob Dylan

from the album Another Side of Bob Dylan
- Released: August 8, 1964
- Recorded: June 9, 1964
- Genre: Folk
- Length: 4:22
- Label: Columbia
- Songwriter: Bob Dylan
- Producer: Tom Wilson

Audio sample
- file; help

"My Back Pages" is a song written by Bob Dylan and included on his 1964 album Another Side of Bob Dylan. It is stylistically similar to his earlier folk protest songs and features Dylan's voice with an acoustic guitar accompaniment. However, its lyrics—in particular the refrain "Ah, but I was so much older then/I'm younger than that now"—have been interpreted as a rejection of Dylan's earlier personal and political idealism, illustrating his growing disillusionment with the 1960s folk protest movement with which he was associated, and his desire to move in a new direction. While Dylan wrote the song in 1964, he did not perform it live until 1988, though his band played a brief instrumental version of it as Dylan took the stage during his 1978 tour.

"My Back Pages" has been covered by artists as diverse as Keith Jarrett, the Byrds, the Ramones, the Nice, Steve Earle, Eric Johnson, and the Hollies. The Byrds' version, initially released on their 1967 album Younger Than Yesterday, was also issued as a single in 1967 and proved to be the band's last Top 40 hit in the U.S.

== Writing, recording and performance ==
Bob Dylan wrote "My Back Pages" in 1964 as one of the last songs—perhaps the last song—composed for his Another Side of Bob Dylan album. He recorded it on June 9, 1964, under the working title of "Ancient Memories", the last song committed to tape for the album. The song was partly based on the traditional folk song "Young But Growing" and has a mournful melody similar to that of "The Lonesome Death of Hattie Carroll" from Dylan's previous album, The Times They Are a-Changin'. As with the other songs on Another Side, Dylan is the sole musician on "My Back Pages" and plays in a style similar to his previous protest songs, with a sneering, rough-edged voice and a hard-strumming acoustic guitar accompaniment.

In the song's lyrics, Dylan criticizes himself for having been certain that he knew everything and apologizes for his previous political preaching, noting that he has become his own enemy "in the instant that I preach." Dylan questions whether one can really distinguish between right and wrong, and even questions the desirability of the principle of equality. The lyrics also signal Dylan's disillusionment with the 1960s protest movement and his intention to abandon protest songwriting. The song effectively analogizes the protest movement to the establishment it is trying to overturn, concluding with the refrain:

Ah, but I was so much older then
I'm younger than that now

Music critic Robert Shelton has interpreted this refrain as "an internal dialogue between what he [Dylan] once accepted and now doubts." Shelton also notes that the refrain maps a path from Blakean experience to the innocence of William Wordsworth. The refrain has also been interpreted as Dylan celebrating his "bright, new post-protest future."

Dylan's disenchantment with the protest movement had previously surfaced in a speech he had given in December 1963 when accepting an award from the Emergency Civil Liberties Committee (ECLC) in New York. Author Mike Marqusee has commented that "No song on Another Side distressed Dylan's friends in the movement more than 'My Back Pages' in which he transmutes the rude incoherence of his ECLC rant into the organized density of art. The lilting refrain ... must be one of the most lyrical expressions of political apostasy ever penned. It is a recantation, in every sense of the word."

In an interview with the Sheffield University Paper in May 1965, Dylan explained the change that had occurred in his songwriting over the previous twelve months, noting "The big difference is that the songs I was writing last year ... they were what I call one-dimensional songs, but my new songs I'm trying to make more three-dimensional, you know, there's more symbolism, they're written on more than one level." In late 1965, Dylan commented on the writing of "My Back Pages" specifically during an interview with Margaret Steen for The Toronto Star: "I was in my New York phase then, or at least, I was just coming out of it. I was still keeping the things that are really really real out of my songs, for fear they'd be misunderstood. Now I don't care if they are." As Dylan stated to Nat Hentoff at the time that "My Back Pages" and the other songs on Another Side of Bob Dylan were written, "There aren't any finger pointing songs [here] ... Now a lot of people are doing finger pointing songs. You know, pointing to all the things that are wrong. Me, I don't want to write for people anymore. You know, be a spokesman."

Dylan did not play "My Back Pages" in concert until June 11, 1988, during a performance at the Shoreline Amphitheatre in Mountain View, California, the fourth concert of his Never Ending Tour which had started four days earlier. The arrangement he used eliminated some of the song's verses and included an electric guitar part performed by G. E. Smith as a member of his newly formed band. Since 1988, Dylan has played the song in concert many times in both electric and semi-acoustic versions, and sometimes as an acoustic encore.

At the 30th Anniversary Tribute Concert to Dylan at Madison Square Garden in 1992, "My Back Pages" was performed in the Byrds' arrangement, with Roger McGuinn, Tom Petty, Neil Young, Eric Clapton, Dylan himself, and George Harrison, each singing one verse in that order. This performance, which included guitar solos from Clapton and Young, also featured Jim Keltner, G. E. Smith, and the three surviving members of Booker T. & the M.G.'s (Steve Cropper, Booker T. Jones, and Donald "Duck" Dunn) as sidemen. It was released on The 30th Anniversary Concert Celebration album in 1993.

In addition to its initial appearance on Another Side of Bob Dylan, "My Back Pages" has appeared on a number of Dylan compilation albums. In the United States and Europe, it appeared on the 1971 album Bob Dylan's Greatest Hits Vol. II (a.k.a. More Bob Dylan Greatest Hits) and on the 2007 album Dylan. In Australia, the song was included on the 1994 compilation album Greatest Hits Vol. 3.

== Cover versions ==
=== The Byrds' version ===
"My Back Pages"
- Dutch picture sleeve

Single by the Byrds

from the album Younger Than Yesterday
- B-side: "Renaissance Fair"
- Released: March 13, 1967
- Recorded: December 5–8, 1966
- Studio: Columbia, Hollywood, California
- Genre: Folk rock
- Length: 3:08 (album); 2:31 (single)
- Label: Columbia
- Songwriter: Bob Dylan
- Producer: Gary Usher

The Byrds US singles chronology
"So You Want to Be a Rock 'n' Roll Star" (1967)	"My Back Pages" (1967)	"Have You Seen Her Face" (1967)

The Byrds UK singles chronology
"So You Want to Be a Rock 'n' Roll Star" (1967)	"My Back Pages" (1967)	"Lady Friend" (1967)

Audio sample
- file; help

The American rock band the Byrds released a recording of "My Back Pages" on February 6, 1967, as part of their fourth album, Younger Than Yesterday. The title of Younger Than Yesterday was directly inspired by the song's refrain of "Ah, but I was so much older then/I'm younger than that now." "My Back Pages" was subsequently issued as a single by the Byrds on March 13, 1967, with the version included on the single being a radio edit that omitted the song's second verse, to reduce the playing time from 3:08 to 2:31. The single reached number 30 on the Billboard Hot 100 and number 18 in Canada, but failed to chart in the United Kingdom. "My Back Pages" was the last single by the Byrds to reach the Top 40 of the U.S. charts.

The song was initially suggested as a suitable vehicle for the band by their manager Jim Dickson. Lead guitarist Jim McGuinn felt that it would make an effective cover version, but David Crosby, the band's rhythm guitarist, felt that covering another Dylan song was formulaic. The Byrds had already released a total of six Dylan covers on their first two albums, Mr. Tambourine Man and Turn! Turn! Turn!, enjoying particular success with their recordings of "Mr. Tambourine Man" and "All I Really Want to Do". Despite Crosby's objections, the band recorded "My Back Pages" between December 5 and 8, 1966, during the recording sessions for their fourth album. Upon its release, this cover was received well by the critics and is today regarded as one of the Byrds' strongest Dylan interpretations. Following its release on Younger Than Yesterday, the song would go on to become a staple of the Byrds' live concert repertoire, until their final disbandment in 1973. On December 4, 1968, a later line-up of the Byrds re-recorded an excerpt of "My Back Pages" as part of a medley that was included on their 1969 album, Dr. Byrds & Mr. Hyde. The song was performed live extensively during the band's later country rock period, often segueing into Jimmy Reed's "Baby What You Want Me to Do". Live versions from this time can be found on Live at Royal Albert Hall 1971 and as a bonus track on the reissue of (Untitled). The song was also performed live by a reformed line-up of the Byrds featuring Roger McGuinn, David Crosby, and Chris Hillman in January 1989.

In addition to its appearance on the Younger Than Yesterday album, the Byrds' original version of "My Back Pages" appears on several of the band's compilations, including The Byrds' Greatest Hits, History of The Byrds, The Byrds Play Dylan, The Original Singles: 1967–1969, Volume 2, The Byrds, The Very Best of The Byrds, The Essential Byrds, and There Is a Season. In 1996, a previously unreleased alternate version of "My Back Pages" (which had been considered for release as a single in 1967) was included as a bonus track on the Columbia/Legacy reissue of Younger Than Yesterday.

=== Other covers ===
The song has been covered by numerous artists, including the Ramones, Po!, America, the Hollies, the Nice, Eric Johnson, the Box Tops, Carl Verheyen, Jackson Browne & Joan Osborne, Marshall Crenshaw, Keith Jarrett, Steve Earle, La Mancha de Rolando, Dick Gaughan, and Anna Nalick. Austrian singer-songwriter Wolfgang Ambros recorded a version of the song named "Alt und Jung" ("Old and Young"). In 1995, the German rock musician Wolfgang Niedecken recorded a German-language (Kölsch language) cover of the song with the title "Vill Passiert Sickher" for his album Leopardefell. In addition, a Japanese-language cover by the Magokoro Brothers is included in the soundtrack of Masked and Anonymous, a feature film with a screenplay co-written by Dylan.

== Personnel ==
- Bob Dylan - vocals, acoustic guitar, harmonica
