= The Essential Byrds =

Greatest hits album by the Byrds
- Released: April 22, 2003
- Recorded: 20 January 1965 – 25 July 1971
- Genres: Rock, folk rock, psychedelic rock, country rock
- Length: 94:40
- Label: Columbia/Legacy
- Producers: Terry Melcher, Allen Stanton, Gary Usher, Bob Johnston, The Byrds

The Byrds chronology
The Columbia Singles '65-'67 (2002)	The Essential Byrds (2003)	Byrd Parts 2 (2003)

The Essential Byrds is a comprehensive two-CD compilation album by the American rock band the Byrds. It was released in 2003 as part of Sony BMG's The Essential series. The Essential Byrds did not chart in the U.S. or the UK. A 3.0 edition of the compilation released in 2011 contains a third disc with six additional tracks: "Spanish Harlem Incident", "I Knew I'd Want You", "The World Turns All Around Her", "I See You", "Change Is Now", and "One Hundred Years from Now".

== Reception ==
Rob Horning from Popmatters said of the compilation: "Similar to the serial-reissue strategy is the hits-repackaging ruse, except the target here is not the fanatic, but the more casual listener, who buys one hits collection only to discover that important songs are included on some other compilation."

Professional ratings
Review scores
Source	Rating
Allmusic	5/5 stars
Pitchfork Media	(8.4/10)

== Track listing ==
=== Disc one ===
1. "Mr. Tambourine Man" (Bob Dylan) – 2:31
2. "I'll Feel a Whole Lot Better" (Gene Clark) – 2:32
3. "All I Really Want to Do" (Bob Dylan) – 2:04
4. "Chimes of Freedom" (Bob Dylan) – 3:51
5. "Turn! Turn! Turn! (to Everything There Is a Season)" (Book of Ecclesiastes/Pete Seeger) – 3:51
6. "She Don't Care About Time" [Single Version] (Gene Clark) – 2:30
7. "It Won't Be Wrong" (Roger McGuinn, Harvey Gerst) – 1:59
8. "Set You Free This Time" (Gene Clark) – 2:50
9. "He Was a Friend of Mine" (traditional, new words and arrangement Roger McGuinn) – 2:31
10. "Eight Miles High" (Gene Clark, David Crosby, Roger McGuinn) – 3:36
11. "5D (Fifth Dimension)" (Roger McGuinn) – 2:34
12. "Mr. Spaceman" (Roger McGuinn) – 2:10
13. "So You Want to Be a Rock 'n' Roll Star" (Chris Hillman, Roger McGuinn) – 2:06
14. "Have You Seen Her Face" (Chris Hillman) – 2:41
15. "Renaissance Fair" (David Crosby, Roger McGuinn) – 1:52
16. "My Back Pages" (Bob Dylan) – 3:08

=== Disc two ===
1. "Lady Friend" (David Crosby) – 2:31
2. "Old John Robertson [Single Version]" (Chris Hillman, Roger McGuinn) – 1:54
3. "Goin' Back" (Gerry Goffin, Carole King) – 3:27
4. "Natural Harmony" (Chris Hillman) – 2:12
5. "Wasn't Born to Follow" (Gerry Goffin, Carole King) – 2:03
6. "You Ain't Goin' Nowhere" (Bob Dylan) – 2:35
7. "Hickory Wind" (Gram Parsons, Bob Buchanan) – 3:32
8. "This Wheel's on Fire" (Bob Dylan, Rick Danko) – 4:45
9. "Drug Store Truck Drivin' Man" (Roger McGuinn, Gram Parsons) – 3:54
10. "Ballad of Easy Rider" (Roger McGuinn, Bob Dylan) – 2:04
  - NOTE: Bob Dylan is not officially credited as a songwriter on "Ballad of Easy Rider".
11. "Jesus Is Just Alright" (Arthur Reynolds) – 2:10
12. "Lover of the Bayou" [Live] (Roger McGuinn, Jacques Levy) – 3:40
13. "Chestnut Mare" (Roger McGuinn, Jacques Levy) – 5:08
14. "Glory, Glory" (Arthur Reynolds) – 4:01
15. "I Wanna Grow Up to Be a Politician" (Roger McGuinn, Jacques Levy) – 2:02
16. "Tiffany Queen" (Roger McGuinn) – 2:41
17. "Farther Along" (traditional, arranged Clarence White) – 2:57

== European and Australasian edition ==
A variation of The Essential Byrds was released outside of the U.S. in 2010, featuring the following alternate track listing:

=== Disc One ===
1. "Mr. Tambourine Man" (Bob Dylan) – 2:31
2. "I'll Feel a Whole Lot Better" (Gene Clark) – 2:32
3. "All I Really Want to Do" (Bob Dylan) – 2:04
4. "The Bells of Rhymney" (Idris Davies, Pete Seeger) - 3:32
5. "Chimes of Freedom" (Bob Dylan) – 3:51
6. "Turn! Turn! Turn! (to Everything There Is a Season)" (Book of Ecclesiastes/Pete Seeger) – 3:51
7. "She Don't Care About Time" [Single Version] (Gene Clark) – 2:30
8. "It Won't Be Wrong" (Roger McGuinn, Harvey Gerst) – 1:59
9. "Lay Down Your Weary Tune" (Bob Dylan) - 3:32
10. "Set You Free This Time" (Gene Clark) – 2:50
11. "He Was a Friend of Mine" (traditional, new words and arrangement Roger McGuinn) – 2:31
12. "The Times They Are a-Changin'" (Bob Dylan) - 2:20
13. "Eight Miles High" (Gene Clark, David Crosby, Roger McGuinn) – 3:36
14. "5D (Fifth Dimension)" (Roger McGuinn) – 2:34
15. "Wild Mountain Thyme" (traditional, arranged Roger McGuinn, Chris Hillman, Michael Clarke, David Crosby) - 2:32
16. "Mr. Spaceman" (Roger McGuinn) – 2:10
17. "So You Want to Be a Rock 'n' Roll Star" (Chris Hillman, Roger McGuinn) – 2:06
18. "Have You Seen Her Face" (Chris Hillman) – 2:41
19. "Time Between" (Chris Hillman) - 1:55
20. "Renaissance Fair" (David Crosby, Roger McGuinn) – 1:52
21. "My Back Pages" (Bob Dylan) – 3:08
22. "Everybody's Been Burned" (David Crosby) – 3:05
23. "Triad" (David Crosby) – 3:29
24. "Dolphin's Smile" (David Crosby, Chris Hillman, Roger McGuinn) - 1:58

=== Disc Two ===
1. "Artificial Energy" (Roger McGuinn, Chris Hillman, Michael Clarke) - 2:21
2. "Old John Robertson [Single Version]" (Chris Hillman, Roger McGuinn) – 1:54
3. "Goin' Back" (Gerry Goffin, Carole King) – 3:27
4. "Natural Harmony" (Chris Hillman) – 2:12
5. "Wasn't Born to Follow" (Gerry Goffin, Carole King) – 2:03
6. "You Ain't Goin' Nowhere" (Bob Dylan) – 2:35
7. "Hickory Wind" (Gram Parsons, Bob Buchanan) – 3:32
8. "Nothing Was Delivered" (Bob Dylan) - 3:26
9. "This Wheel's on Fire" (Bob Dylan, Rick Danko) – 4:45
10. "Drug Store Truck Drivin' Man" (Roger McGuinn, Gram Parsons) – 3:54
11. "Your Gentle Way of Loving Me" (Gib Guilbeau, Gary Paxton) 2:37
12. "Ballad of Easy Rider" (Roger McGuinn, Bob Dylan) – 2:04
  - NOTE: Bob Dylan is not officially credited as a songwriter on "Ballad of Easy Rider".
13. "Jesus Is Just Alright" (Arthur Reynolds) – 2:10
14. "It's All Over Now, Baby Blue" (Bob Dylan) - 4:55
15. "Lover of the Bayou" [Live] (Roger McGuinn, Jacques Levy) – 3:40
16. "Chestnut Mare" (Roger McGuinn, Jacques Levy) – 5:08
17. "Glory, Glory" (Arthur Reynolds) – 4:01
18. "Jamaica Say You Will" (Jackson Browne) - 3:28
19. "I Wanna Grow up to Be a Politician" (Roger McGuinn, Jacques Levy) – 2:02
20. "Tiffany Queen" (Roger McGuinn) – 2:41
21. "Antique Sandy" (Roger McGuinn, Skip Battin, Gene Parsons, Clarence White, Jimmi Seiter) - 2:15
22. "Farther Along" (traditional, arranged Clarence White) – 2:57

== Band personnel ==
- 1965-'66 - Roger McGuinn, Gene Clark, David Crosby, Michael Clarke, Chris Hillman
- 1966-'67 - Roger McGuinn, Chris Hillman, Michael Clarke, David Crosby
- 1968 - Roger McGuinn, Chris Hillman, Kevin Kelley, Gram Parsons
- 1969 - Roger McGuinn, Clarence White, Gene Parsons, John York
- 1970-'72 - Roger McGuinn, Clarence White, Gene Parsons, Skip Battin

== Sources ==
- CD booklet essay, Alan Bisbort, c.2003.
- AllMusicGuide.com
