= There Is a Season =

Box set by the Byrds
- Released: September 26, 2006
- Recorded: Mid-1964 – January 1973; August 6 – August 8, 1990
- Genres: Rock, pop, folk rock, psychedelic rock, country rock
- Length: 4:40:20
- Label: Columbia/Legacy
- Producers: Jim Dickson, Terry Melcher, Allen Stanton, Gary Usher, Bob Johnston, Chris Hinshaw, the Byrds, Neil Wilburn, Richard G. Abramson, Michael Varhol, David Crosby, Don DeVito

The Byrds chronology
The Very Best of The Byrds (2006)	There Is a Season (2006)	A Collection (2007)

There Is a Season is a four-CD and one DVD box set by the American rock band the Byrds that was released on September 26, 2006 by Columbia/Legacy. It comprises 99 tracks and includes material from every one of the band's twelve studio albums, presented in roughly chronological order. The bonus DVD features ten clips of the Byrds lip-synching their hits on television programs between 1965 and 1967. Upon release, the box set failed to reach the Billboard 200 chart or the UK Albums Chart. There Is a Season supplants the band's earlier box set, The Byrds, which was released in October 1990.

== Contents ==
Unlike the band's earlier box set, There Is a Season includes material pre-dating the band's 1965 debut single for Columbia Records "Mr. Tambourine Man". This pre-fame period in the group's history is represented by a number of demo recordings from the band's 1964 rehearsals at World Pacific Studios in Los Angeles (when they were known as the Jet Set), and both sides of a 1964 single released by the group under the pseudonym the Beefeaters. The set also includes selections from the band's 1973 reunion album Byrds and two 1973 recordings from the Banjoman film—a period also not covered by the first box set. There Is a Season includes more songs written by founding member Gene Clark, as a response to fan criticism that the first box set had neglected to properly represent his contributions to the band.

== Reception ==
Professional ratings
Review scores
Source	Rating
AllMusic	4.5/5 stars
The Guardian	3/5 stars
Mojo	4/5 stars
Pitchfork Media	8.3/10
PopMatters	10/10 stars
Q	5/5 stars
Rolling Stone	5/5 stars
Spin	4/5 stars
Uncut	5/5 stars

Although There Is a Season was generally well received critically, a number of reviews expressed disappointment over the relatively small number of previously unreleased tracks included in the set. Joe Tangari, writing for Pitchfork Media, praised the compilation's well-chosen track listing but expressed confusion as to who the box set was aimed at, since most hardcore fans would already own the majority of its contents. Alexis Petridis was also unenthusiastic about the contents of the set in his review for The Guardian: "Bearing only five previously unreleased tracks – all live, all with a distinct air of 'so what?' – There Is a Season smacks less of curating an important artist's legacy than of record company desperation at the lucrative back-catalogue well running dry."

This opinion was echoed by Richie Unterberger, who commented on the AllMusic website: "the point of putting out another four-CD Byrds box set about 15 years later wasn't all that clear, unless it was a mercenary exercise to get more mileage out of the band's durable catalog." Michael Franco's review for the PopMatters website was more upbeat and described the box set as "a must-have for any serious collector of music" and "the definitive collection of The Byrds".

== Track listing ==
NOTE: Tracks marked ‡ are previously unreleased.

=== Disc one ===
1. "The Only Girl I Adore" (Gene Clark, Roger McGuinn) - 2:26
  - performed by the Jet Set
2. "Please Let Me Love You" (Gene Clark, Roger McGuinn, Harvey Gerst) - 2:23
  - performed by the Beefeaters
3. "Don't Be Long" (Roger McGuinn, Harvey Gerst) - 1:56
  - performed by the Beefeaters
4. "The Airport Song" (Roger McGuinn, David Crosby) - 2:03
5. "You Movin'" (Gene Clark) - 2:08
6. "You Showed Me" (Gene Clark, Roger McGuinn) - 2:04
  - tracks 4–6 are performed by the Jet Set
7. "Mr. Tambourine Man" (Bob Dylan) - 2:32
8. "I’ll Feel a Whole Lot Better" (Gene Clark) - 2:34
9. "You Won't Have to Cry" (Gene Clark, Roger McGuinn) - 2:10
10. "Here Without You" (Gene Clark) - 2:39
11. "The Bells of Rhymney" (Idris Davies, Pete Seeger) - 3:33
12. "All I Really Want to Do" [single version] (Bob Dylan) - 2:05
13. "I Knew I'd Want You" (Gene Clark) - 2:17
14. "Chimes of Freedom" (Bob Dylan) - 3:54
15. "She Has a Way" (Gene Clark) - 2:27
16. "It's All Over Now, Baby Blue" (Bob Dylan) - 3:05
17. "Turn! Turn! Turn! (To Everything There Is a Season)" (Book of Ecclesiastes/Pete Seeger) - 3:52
18. "It Won't Be Wrong" (Roger McGuinn, Harvey Gerst) - 2:00
19. "Set You Free This Time" (Gene Clark) - 2:51
20. "The World Turns All Around Her" (Gene Clark) - 2:15
21. "The Day Walk" (Gene Clark) - 3:03
22. "If You're Gone" (Gene Clark) - 2:47
23. "The Times They Are a-Changin'" [withdrawn version] (Bob Dylan) - 1:56
24. "She Don't Care About Time" [single version] (Gene Clark) - 2:32
25. "Stranger in a Strange Land" [instrumental] (David Crosby) - 3:03

=== Disc two ===
1. "Eight Miles High" (Gene Clark, David Crosby, Roger McGuinn) - 3:37
2. "Why" [single version] (David Crosby, Roger McGuinn) - 3:01
3. "5D (Fifth Dimension)" (Roger McGuinn) - 2:35
4. "Wild Mountain Thyme" (traditional, arranged Roger McGuinn, Chris Hillman, Michael Clarke, David Crosby) - 2:32
5. "Mr. Spaceman" (Roger McGuinn) - 2:12
6. "I See You" (David Crosby, Roger McGuinn) - 2:40
7. "What's Happening?!?!" (David Crosby) - 2:37
8. "I Know My Rider" (traditional, arranged Roger McGuinn, Chris Hillman, David Crosby) - 2:46
9. "So You Want to Be a Rock 'n' Roll Star" (Roger McGuinn, Chris Hillman) - 2:08
10. "Have You Seen Her Face" (Chris Hillman) - 2:42
11. "Renaissance Fair" (David Crosby, Roger McGuinn) - 1:54
12. "Time Between" (Chris Hillman) - 1:55
13. "Everybody's Been Burned" (David Crosby) - 3:07
14. "My Back Pages" (Bob Dylan) - 3:10
15. "It Happens Each Day" (David Crosby) - 2:47
16. "He Was a Friend of Mine" [live] (traditional, new words and arrangement Roger McGuinn) - 2:39 ‡
17. "Lady Friend" (David Crosby) - 2:33
18. "Old John Robertson" [single version] (Chris Hillman, Roger McGuinn) - 1:52
19. "Goin' Back" (Carole King, Gerry Goffin) - 3:28
20. "Draft Morning" (David Crosby, Chris Hillman, Roger McGuinn) - 2:43
21. "Wasn't Born to Follow" (Carole King, Gerry Goffin) - 2:04
22. "Tribal Gathering" (David Crosby, Chris Hillman) - 2:04
23. "Dolphin's Smile" (David Crosby, Chris Hillman, Roger McGuinn) - 2:01
24. "Triad" (David Crosby) - 3:31
25. "Universal Mind Decoder" [instrumental] (Chris Hillman, Roger McGuinn) - 3:27

=== Disc three ===
1. "You Ain't Goin' Nowhere" (Bob Dylan) - 2:35
2. "I Am a Pilgrim" (traditional, arranged Roger McGuinn, Chris Hillman) - 3:39
3. "The Christian Life" [Gram Parsons vocal version] (Charlie Louvin, Ira Louvin) - 2:29
4. "You Don't Miss Your Water" [Gram Parsons vocal version] (William Bell) - 3:49
5. "Hickory Wind" (Gram Parsons, Bob Buchanan) - 3:32
6. "One Hundred Years from Now" [Gram Parsons vocal version] (Gram Parsons) - 2:53
7. "Lazy Days" [alternate version] (Gram Parsons) - 3:18
8. "Pretty Polly" [alternate version] (traditional, arranged Roger McGuinn, Chris Hillman) - 3:34
9. "This Wheel's on Fire" [alternate version] (Bob Dylan, Rick Danko) - 3:54
10. "Drug Store Truck Drivin' Man" (Roger McGuinn, Gram Parsons) - 3:54
11. "Candy" (Roger McGuinn, John York) - 3:38
12. "Child of the Universe" [Candy soundtrack version] (Dave Grusin, Roger McGuinn) - 3:11
13. "Pretty Boy Floyd" [live] (Woody Guthrie) - 2:48
14. "Buckaroo" [live instrumental] (Bob Morris) - 2:04
15. "King Apathy III" [live] (Roger McGuinn) - 3:13
16. "Sing Me Back Home" [live] (Merle Haggard) - 3:05
17. "Lay Lady Lay" [alternate version] (Bob Dylan) - 3:18
18. "Oil in My Lamp" [alternate version] (traditional, arranged Roger McGuinn, Clarence White) - 2:03
19. "Tulsa County" (Pamela Polland) - 2:48
20. "Jesus Is Just Alright" (Arthur Reynolds) - 2:10
21. "Chestnut Mare" (Roger McGuinn, Jacques Levy) - 5:08
22. "Just a Season" (Roger McGuinn, Jacques Levy) - 3:52
23. "Kathleen's Song" [alternate version] (Roger McGuinn, Jacques Levy) - 2:39
24. "All the Things" [alternate version] (Roger McGuinn, Jacques Levy) - 4:56

=== Disc four ===
1. "Lover of the Bayou" [live] (Roger McGuinn, Jacques Levy) - 3:39
2. "Positively 4th Street" [live] (Bob Dylan) - 3:06
3. "Old Blue" [live] (traditional, arranged Roger McGuinn) - 3:30
4. "It's Alright, Ma (I'm Only Bleeding)" [live] (Bob Dylan) - 2:52
5. "Ballad of Easy Rider" [live] (Roger McGuinn, Bob Dylan) - 2:10
  - NOTE: Bob Dylan is not officially credited as a songwriter on "Ballad of Easy Rider".
6. "You All Look Alike" [live] (Skip Battin, Kim Fowley) - 3:08 ‡
7. "Nashville West" [live instrumental] (Gene Parsons, Clarence White) - 2:12 ‡
8. "Willin'" [live] (Lowell George) - 3:13
9. "Black Mountain Rag" [live instrumental] (traditional, arranged Clarence White, Roger McGuinn) - 1:19
10. "Baby What You Want Me to Do" [live] (Jimmy Reed) - 3:48 ‡
11. "I Trust" [live] (Roger McGuinn) - 4:03 ‡
12. "Take a Whiff (On Me)" [live] (Alan Lomax, John Lomax, Huddie Ledbetter/arranged Clarence White, Roger McGuinn) - 2:56
13. "Glory, Glory" (Arthur Reynolds) - 4:00
14. "Byrdgrass" [instrumental] (Gene Parsons, Clarence White) - 1:44
15. "Pale Blue" (Roger McGuinn) - 2:23
16. "I Wanna Grow Up to Be a Politician" (Roger McGuinn, Jacques Levy) - 2:03
17. "Nothin' to It" [instrumental] (Doc Watson) - 1:39
18. "Tiffany Queen" (Roger McGuinn) - 2:42
19. "Farther Along" (traditional, arranged Clarence White) - 2:58
20. "Bugler" (Larry Murray) - 3:08
21. "Mr. Tambourine Man" [Banjoman soundtrack version] (Bob Dylan) - 2:59
22. "Roll Over Beethoven" [Banjoman soundtrack version] (Chuck Berry) - 3:02
23. "Full Circle" (Gene Clark) - 2:43
24. "Changing Heart" (Gene Clark) - 2:43
25. "Paths of Victory" (Bob Dylan) - 3:10
