= So You Want to Be a Rock 'n' Roll Star =

- Danish picture sleeve

Single by the Byrds

from the album Younger Than Yesterday
- B-side: "Everybody's Been Burned"
- Released: January 9, 1967
- Recorded: November 28 – December 1, 1966
- Studio: Columbia, Hollywood, California
- Genre: Rock
- Length: 2:05
- Label: Columbia
- Songwriters: Jim McGuinn, Chris Hillman
- Producer: Gary Usher

The Byrds singles chronology
"Mr. Spaceman" (1966)	"So You Want to Be a Rock 'n' Roll Star" (1967)	"My Back Pages" (1967)

Audio sample
- "So You Want to Be a Rock 'n' Roll Star": file; help

Music video
- "So You Want to Be a Rock 'n' Roll Star" (audio) on YouTube

"So You Want to Be a Rock 'n' Roll Star" is a song by the American rock band the Byrds. Written by Jim McGuinn and Chris Hillman, it was included on the band's 1967 album, Younger Than Yesterday. The song was inspired by the manufactured nature of the Monkees and was released as a single on January 9, 1967, reaching number 29 on the Billboard Hot 100, but failing to chart in the United Kingdom.

== Composition and content ==
Written in late 1966, "So You Want to be a Rock 'n' Roll Star" has been described by Byrds expert Tim Conners as "an acerbic, but good-natured swipe at the success of manufactured rock bands like the Monkees." The Monkees television series had debuted in America in September 1966, and had launched the pre-fabricated band to international fame. The manufactured nature of the group caused the Byrds' bassist, Chris Hillman, and lead guitarist, Jim McGuinn, to look upon the current state of the pop world with more than a little cynicism—something that was reflected in the song's lyrics.

Musically, "So You Want to be a Rock 'n' Roll Star" features a driving, circular Rickenbacker guitar riff by McGuinn and what Conners has called an "unstoppable bass hook" from Hillman. Hillman has stated that he composed the song's bass part during a recording session for South African musician Hugh Masekela. The song also features Masekela's trumpet playing, which represents the first use of brass on a Byrds recording. In addition, "So You Want to Be a Rock 'n' Roll Star" features the sound of hysterical teenage pop fans screaming. These screams were recorded at a Byrds' concert on August 15, 1965 in Bournemouth by the band's publicist, Derek Taylor, at McGuinn's request.

Rolling Stone editor David Fricke has written that although the song's lyrics are heavily sarcastic, beneath the playful cynicism there is a deeper, implicit irony to the song; the Byrds had, themselves, achieved almost overnight success with the release of their debut single, a cover of Bob Dylan's "Mr. Tambourine Man". However, the band members all knew, from their common bitter personal experiences, that the most difficult part of success was in remaining successful, staying ahead of the curve artistically, and staying sane under the immense pressure of stardom.

During an interview with music journalist Pete Frame, McGuinn said:

Some people have accused us of being bitter for writing that song, but it's no more bitter than "Positively 4th Street." In fact, it isn't as bitter as that. We were thumbing through a teen magazine and looking at all the unfamiliar faces and we couldn't help thinking: "Wow, what's happening … all of a sudden here is everyone and his brother and his sister-in-law and his mother and even his pet bullfrog singing rock 'n' roll." So we wrote "So You Want to Be a Rock 'n' Roll Star" to the audience of potential rock stars, those who were going to be, or who wanted to be, and those who actually did go on to realize their goals.

== Release ==
Upon release, Billboard magazine described the song as a "powerful rocker with teen-oriented lyric about becoming a rock star and the outcome of that stardom", predicting that the song could be a "giant". Cash Box said the single is a "wild, steady-moving pounder" that can be a bounce back hit for the Byrds. To promote the song, the band performed it on a number of television programs, including Popside, Top of the Pops, Drop In, The David Frost Show, and Beat-Club. The band also performed "So You Want to Be a Rock 'n' Roll Star" as the final song of their appearance at the Monterey Pop Festival, with the help of guest musicians Hugh Masekela and Big Black. The Byrds' performance of the song at Monterey is included on the 1992 The Monterey International Pop Festival CD box set.

In addition to its appearance on the Younger Than Yesterday album, "So You Want to Be a Rock 'n' Roll Star" also appears on several Byrds' compilations, including The Byrds' Greatest Hits; History of The Byrds; The Original Singles: 1965–1967, Volume 1; The Byrds; The Very Best of The Byrds; The Essential Byrds; and There Is a Season. Live performances of the song are included on the live portion of The Byrds' (Untitled) album, as well as on the Live at the Fillmore - February 1969 and Live at Royal Albert Hall 1971 albums.

== Cover versions ==
The two earliest cover versions of "So You Want To Be A Rock 'n' Roll Star" were by the Royal Guardsmen, on their 1967 album The Return of the Red Baron, and the British band the Move, who included the song on their 1968 EP, Something Else from The Move.

Hookfoot, the British group who served as Elton John's backing band for a number of years, also released the song as a single in 1974. The song was covered by Scottish hard rock band Nazareth, as part of the track "Telegram", on their 1976 album Close Enough for Rock 'n' Roll. Black Oak Arkansas covered the song on their 1977 The Best of Black Oak Arkansas album, with the song later being included on the Hot & Nasty: The Best of Black Oak Arkansas compilation album in 1993.

In 1979, "So You Want to Be a Rock 'n' Roll Star" was recorded by the Patti Smith Group and released as the third single from their album Wave. The song was also covered by Tom Petty and the Heartbreakers during their Southern Accents tour, and it appears on the 1985 live album, Pack Up the Plantation: Live!

In 1984, McGuinn joined R.E.M. on stage at the Capitol Theatre in Passaic, New Jersey, for a rendition of "So You Want to Be a Rock 'n' Roll Star". R.E.M.'s Peter Buck explained: "When we played 'Rock 'n' Roll Star', where it has that part where it goes 'la la la la la la la', he played C-F-G, and I said, 'That's weird, we do C-D-G'. Then he played it that way and said, 'You know, I like that better. I think I'll change it'. And I went, 'You mean you're going to change the chord of the song?' and he went, 'Yeah, I've never played it that way, and I like it a lot better'. Roger McGuinn's been playing that song for twenty years, and here I suggest he plays it this way, and he does!"

Unrest recorded a version of "So You Want to Be a Rock 'n' Roll Star" in 1985 for their self-titled debut album. They later re-recorded the song during the sessions for their fourth album, Malcolm X Park, released in 1988.

The Swedish pop group Roxette included the song in their 1993 MTV Unplugged show.

The German alternative rock/punk band Beatsteaks covered the song on their 2004 "Hand in Hand" single. In 2006, Les Fradkin released a cover version of the song on his album Goin' Back. Also, the Dutch rock band Golden Earring covered the song as a bonus track on their This Wheel's on Fire CD single.

Pearl Jam have covered "So You Want to Be a Rock 'n' Roll Star" a number of times at live concerts. Pearl Jam's singer, Eddie Vedder, also covered it during his 2012 American solo tour.

The British rock band Charlie released a song titled "Killer Cut" in 1979, that is essentially a sequel to "So You Want to Be a Rock 'n' Roll Star" and begins with the lyrics "So you want to be a rock and roll star, well, times have changed/That's all I'll say/You still need an electric guitar but most of all you need that radio, radio play." Counting Crows have been known to perform a few lines from "So You Want to Be a Rock 'n' Roll Star" as an introduction to their song "Mr. Jones" during live performances.

Charly Garcia and Fito Paez recorded the song in Spanish as "Rock And Roll Star" for Charly Garcia's 2024 album La lógica del escorpión.
