= Turn! Turn! Turn! (album) =

Studio album by the Byrds
- Released: December 6, 1965
- Recorded: June 28 – November 1, 1965
- Studios: Columbia, Hollywood
- Genre: Folk rock
- Length: 30:24
- Label: Columbia
- Producer: Terry Melcher

The Byrds chronology
| Mr. Tambourine Man (1965) | Turn! Turn! Turn! (1965) | Fifth Dimension (1966) |

Singles from Turn! Turn! Turn!
- 1. "Turn! Turn! Turn!" Released: October 1, 1965; 2. "Set You Free This Time" Released: January 10, 1966; 3. "It Won't Be Wrong" Released: February 18, 1966

Alternative cover
- Cover of the 1977 Embassy Records reissue (CBS 31526)

Turn! Turn! Turn! is the second studio album by the American rock band the Byrds, released on December 6, 1965, by Columbia Records. Like its predecessor, Mr. Tambourine Man, the album epitomized the folk rock genre and continued the band's successful mix of vocal harmony and jangly twelve-string Rickenbacker guitar. The album's lead single and title track, "Turn! Turn! Turn!", which was adapted by Pete Seeger from text in the Book of Ecclesiastes, had previously been arranged in a chamber-folk style by the Byrd's lead guitarist Jim McGuinn for folk singer Judy Collins' third album, but the arrangement he used for the Byrds' recording of the song utilizes the same folk-rock style as the band's previous hit singles.

The album peaked at number 17 on the Billboard Top LPs chart and went to number 11 in the United Kingdom. The "Turn! Turn! Turn!" single preceded the album by two months and topped the Billboard Hot 100 chart. Another single taken from the album, "Set You Free This Time", was less successful and failed to break into the top 50 in the U.S.

On Turn! Turn! Turn!, McGuinn's contributions to songwriting increased and rhythm guitarist David Crosby received his first writing credit on a Byrds album, but the band's prolific songwriter Gene Clark still contributed most of the original material. The album included two Bob Dylan covers: "The Times They Are a-Changin'" and the then-unreleased song "Lay Down Your Weary Tune". It would be the last Byrds album to feature the full participation of Gene Clark until the release of the original quintet's 1973 reunion album, Byrds.

== Background ==
In the wake of the international success of their debut album and the hit singles "Mr. Tambourine Man" and "All I Really Want to Do", the Byrds entered Columbia Studios in Hollywood on June 28, 1965, to set about recording their follow-up album. By the latter half of 1965, the folk rock trend the band had been instrumental in originating was gaining momentum, with hit records by the likes of Cher, the Turtles, We Five, and Barry McGuire clearly bearing the hallmarks of the Byrds' influence. Despite being such an influential band, the Byrds had been disappointed with the relative lack of success that their second single, "All I Really Want to Do", had achieved on the American charts and felt they needed a strong third single to maintain their foothold in the marketplace.

Initially, the band elected to record a third Bob Dylan cover, "It's All Over Now, Baby Blue", as their next single, but, despite a couple of attempts to record the song in June and August 1965, it was ultimately rejected. The band then briefly considered issuing a version of Dylan's "The Times They Are a-Changin'" as a single instead, but this idea was also discarded, although the song does appear on Turn! Turn! Turn! The song finally selected by the band for their third single was Pete Seeger's "Turn! Turn! Turn!", a musical adaptation of words taken from the Biblical Book of Ecclesiastes, which would return the group to the top of the Billboard Hot 100.

The recording of the album was not without its tensions, with several members of the band expressing feelings of resentment towards the close working relationship that was forming between McGuinn and producer Terry Melcher. Rhythm guitarist David Crosby was particularly vocal in his disapproval, since he felt McGuinn and Melcher (along with the band's manager Jim Dickson) were conspiring to keep his songs off the album. Crosby had brought the self-penned "Stranger in a Strange Land" (later released by Blackburn & Snow) and "The Flower Bomb Song", along with Dino Valenti's "I Don't Ever Want to Spoil Your Party" (later released by Quicksilver Messenger Service as "Dino's Song") to the recording sessions, but all three songs were rejected and remained unreleased at the time.

Tension was also developing between Gene Clark and the rest of the Byrds due to the higher level of income he was receiving as the band's principal songwriter. This resulted in Clark becoming increasingly isolated within the band and some of his best songs being relegated to appearances on B-sides or left unreleased altogether. Ultimately, this resentment would be a contributing factor in Clark's departure from the band in early 1966.

Yet another source of conflict was the power struggle that was developing between Melcher and Dickson. For his part, Dickson had aspirations to produce the band himself, which led to him being overly critical of Melcher's production work and would culminate in Melcher's dismissal as the band's producer following completion of the album.

The album's front cover photograph was taken by Guy Webster at his studio in Beverly Hills, California, and was later nominated for the Grammy Award for Best Album Cover. The LP's back cover liner notes were written by the Byrds' publicist, Derek Taylor, and were an edited version of a much longer description of the album and its recording that would later appear in its complete form in the February 15, 1966, edition of Record World magazine.

== Music ==
Turn! Turn! Turn! opens with the Pete Seeger–penned title track, which was issued as a single two months ahead of the release of the album. Based on an arrangement McGuinn had developed while working on Judy Collins' 1963 album Judy Collins 3, the idea of reviving the song came to him during the Byrds' first American tour. It reputedly took the band 78 tries, spread over five days of recording, to get the take they released. Rolling Stone editor David Fricke has commented that the song's plea for peace and tolerance was custom-made for the 1960s, a decade colored by assassinations, urban rioting, and the horrors of the Vietnam War. Peaking at number 1 on the Billboard Hot 100, the single represented the high-water mark of folk rock as a musical trend and reinforced the Byrds' standing as a commercial chart act.

The Byrds also included two Bob Dylan songs on the album, in an attempt to repeat the success they had enjoyed with their covers of his material on their debut LP. "Lay Down Your Weary Tune" was an unreleased outtake from Dylan's The Times They Are a-Changin' album that had been obtained by the band through Dylan's publisher. Dylan was impressed when he heard the band's reading of his song, telling McGuinn: "Up until I heard this I thought you were just another imitator ... but this has got real feeling to it." The other Dylan song the band included on Turn! Turn! Turn! was "The Times They Are a-Changin'", which the band's biographer Johnny Rogan has described as a sardonic reading of the protest anthem, subverting the seriousness evident in the original and replacing it with irony.

Of the self-penned material on the album, three songs were written by Clark, including "The World Turns All Around Her", which echoed his Beatlesque songs of tortured romance on the band's debut album, and "If You're Gone", a confession of emotional insecurity. To highlight the wistful melancholy of "If You're Gone", McGuinn and Melcher devised a droning, Gregorian harmony vocal part that sounds uncannily like another instrument and foreshadowed the raga rock experimentation the band would undertake on their next album. The third Clark-penned song on Turn! Turn! Turn! was "Set You Free This Time", a densely worded rumination on a failed relationship that lyrically exhibited the influence of Dylan. The song had been written by Clark during the Byrds' 1965 tour of England after a night spent drinking with Paul McCartney at the fashionable Scotch of St James club in London.

McGuinn's songwriting contributions to the album included "It Won't Be Wrong", which he wrote with his friend Harvey Gerst in 1964. An earlier version of the song, titled "Don't Be Long", had been issued on a 1964 single the Byrds released as "the Beefeaters". Another of McGuinn's contributions was an adaptation of "He Was a Friend of Mine". Before the formation of the Byrds, he had added lyrics dealing with the assassination of President John F. Kennedy to the traditional folk song, as he explained to Rogan in 1977: "I wrote that song the night John F. Kennedy was assassinated. I suppose you could say it's one of the earliest Byrds songs." "He Was a Friend of Mine" is also notable for being the first Byrds recording to feature McGuinn playing an acoustic guitar, instead of his usual twelve-string Rickenbacker.

The album featured the first appearance of a song written by McGuinn and Crosby: "Wait and See". The pair had previously collaborated on "The Airport Song", but it would not be heard publicly until the release of Preflyte in 1969. According to Rogan, both men wanted to move away from the simple boy/girl romance songs the band had been writing since 1964, but Rogan has pointed out that "Wait and See" is even more in that tradition than the earliest of Gene Clark's songs. "Wait and See" also marked the first time Crosby received a songwriting credit on a Byrds album.

Another cover on the album is "Satisfied Mind", a 1955 country and western chart-topper for Porter Wagoner, which was suggested by the Byrds' bass player, Chris Hillman. The song was the first sign of the band's interest in country music, a genre they would explore further on subsequent albums, culminating with 1968's Sweetheart of the Rodeo.

As with the band's previous album, Turn! Turn! Turn! ended on a quirky, tongue-in-cheek note, this time with a whimsical send-up of Stephen Foster's 19th-century classic "Oh! Susannah", arranged by McGuinn. Despite being recorded as an intentionally humorous reading of the song, McGuinn later admitted to journalist Vincent Flanders that he was dissatisfied with the track, stating: "That was a joke, but it didn't come off, it was poorly told."

Due to the infighting caused by the other band members' resentment of Clark's songwriting dominance within the Byrds, two of the songs he had brought to the recording sessions were excluded from the album. His romantic and densely worded "She Don't Care About Time", which featured a guitar solo inspired by Bach's "Jesu, Joy of Man's Desiring", was issued on the B-side of the "Turn! Turn! Turn!" single, while the Dylanesque "The Day Walk (Never Before)" was left to languish in the Columbia tape vaults for more than 20 years. The song was finally issued in 1987, when it was chosen as the title track of the Byrds' archival album Never Before. Both "She Don't Care About Time" and "The Day Walk (Never Before)" were added to the remastered Turn! Turn! Turn! CD as bonus tracks.

== Release and reception ==
Professional ratings
Review scores
| Source | Rating |
|---|---|
| Record Mirror | 4/5 stars |

Turn! Turn! Turn! was released on December 6, 1965, in the United States (catalogue item CL 2454 in mono, CS 9254 in stereo) and March 22, 1966, in the UK (catalogue item BPG 62652 in mono, SBPG 62652 in stereo). It peaked at number 17 on the Billboard Top LPs chart, during a chart stay of 40 weeks, and reached number 11 in the United Kingdom, spending a total of 5 weeks on the UK chart. The preceding "Turn! Turn! Turn!" single was released on October 1, 1965, in the U.S., and October 29, 1965, in the UK, reaching number 1 on the Billboard Hot 100 and number 26 on the UK Singles Chart. A second single taken from the album, "Set You Free This Time" (b/w "It Won't Be Wrong"), was released on January 10, 1966, in the U.S., peaking at number 63 on the Billboard Hot 100, but failing to chart in the UK.

Upon release, the album garnered mostly positive reviews, with Robert Shelton commenting in The New York Times that it was "not so strong as the first Byrds LP, Mr. Tambourine Man, but still an effective program of folk-rock." Billboard magazine described the album's contents by stating that "the group offers a diversified program of material that is certain to soar up the LP charts." In the UK, Richard Bruce enthusiastically praised the album in his review for Music Echo by describing the record as "so sensationally brilliant that even after [one] hearing, I've no hesitation in saying they are proving they have as big a talent as the Beatles and the Stones!"

In more recent years, Richie Unterberger has written on the AllMusic website that the album "was only a disappointment in comparison with Mr. Tambourine Man. It was still quite good, however, particularly the ringing number one title cut, a classic on par with the 'Mr. Tambourine Man' single." It was voted number 934 in Colin Larkin's All Time Top 1000 Albums 3rd Edition (2000).

=== Remix information ===
The album was one of four Byrds albums that were remastered at 20-bit resolution and partially remixed as part of the Columbia/Legacy Byrds reissue series. This release of the album was issued on April 30, 1996, and had seven bonus tracks: the Clark-penned B-side "She Don't Care About Time"; the outtakes "The Day Walk (Never Before)", "It's All Over Now, Baby Blue", and "Stranger in a Strange Land"; and three alternate versions of songs.

The reason for remixing some of the album was explained by Bob Irwin (who produced these re-issues for compact disc) during an interview:

The first four Byrds albums had sold so well, and the master tapes used so much that they were at least two, if not three generations down from the original. In most cases, a first-generation master no longer existed. They were basically played to death; they were worn out, there was nothing left of them.

He further stated:

Each album is taken from the original multi-tracks, where they exist, which is in 95% of the cases. We remixed them exactly as they were, without taking any liberties, except for the occasional song appearing in stereo for the first time.

Many fans enjoy the remixed album because it is very close to the original mix in most cases and offers noticeably better sound quality.

== Track listing ==
Side One
| No. | Title | Writer(s) | Length |
|---|---|---|---|
| 1. | "Turn! Turn! Turn! (To Everything There Is a Season)" | Book of Ecclesiastes/Pete Seeger | 3:49 |
| 2. | "It Won't Be Wrong" | Jim McGuinn, Harvey Gerst | 1:58 |
| 3. | "Set You Free This Time" | Gene Clark | 2:49 |
| 4. | "Lay Down Your Weary Tune" | Bob Dylan | 3:30 |
| 5. | "He Was a Friend of Mine" | traditional, new words and arrangement Jim McGuinn | 2:30 |

Side Two
| No. | Title | Writer(s) | Length |
|---|---|---|---|
| 1. | "The World Turns All Around Her" | Clark | 2:13 |
| 2. | "Satisfied Mind" | Red Hayes, Jack Rhodes | 2:26 |
| 3. | "If You're Gone" | Clark | 2:45 |
| 4. | "The Times They Are a-Changin'" | Dylan | 2:18 |
| 5. | "Wait and See" | McGuinn, David Crosby | 2:19 |
| 6. | "Oh! Susannah" | Stephen Foster | 3:03 |
| Total length: | | | 29:40 |

1996 CD reissue bonus tracks
| No. | Title | Writer(s) | Length |
|---|---|---|---|
| 12. | "The Day Walk (Never Before)" | Clark | 3:00 |
| 13. | "She Don't Care About Time" (single version) | Clark | 2:29 |
| 14. | "The Times They Are a-Changin'" (first version) | Dylan | 1:54 |
| 15. | "It's All Over Now, Baby Blue" (version 1) | Dylan | 3:03 |
| 16. | "She Don't Care About Time" (version 1) | Clark | 2:35 |
| 17. | "The World Turns All Around Her" (alternate mix) | Clark | 2:12 |
| 18. | "Stranger in a Strange Land" (instrumental) | Crosby | 3:04 |

- Note: The album erroneously credits "Oh! Susannah" to Jim McGuinn.
- Sides one and two were combined as tracks 1–11 on CD reissues.

== Singles ==
1. "Turn! Turn! Turn! (To Everything There Is A Season)" b/w "She Don't Care About Time" (Columbia 43424) October 1, 1965 (Billboard Hot 100 number 1, UK Singles Chart number 26)
2. "Set You Free This Time" b/w "It Won't Be Wrong" (Columbia 43501) January 10, 1966 (Billboard Hot 100 number 63)
3. "It Won't Be Wrong" b/w "Set You Free This Time" (CBS 202037) February 18, 1966

== Personnel ==
The Byrds

- Jim McGuinn – lead guitar, acoustic guitar, vocals
- Gene Clark – rhythm guitar, harmonica, tambourine, vocals
- David Crosby – rhythm guitar, vocals
- Chris Hillman – electric bass (backing vocal on "Lay Down Your Weary Tune")
- Michael Clarke – drums (tambourine on "He Was a Friend of Mine")

Additional personnel

- Terry Melcher – organ on "He Was a Friend of Mine"

== Release history ==
| Date | Label | Format | Country | Catalog | Notes |
|---|---|---|---|---|---|
| December 6, 1965 | Columbia | LP | US | CL 2454 | Original mono release. |
| December 6, 1965 | Columbia | LP | US | CS 9254 | Original stereo release.* |
| March 22, 1966 | CBS | LP | UK | BPG 62652 | Original mono release. |
| March 22, 1966 | CBS | LP | UK | SBPG 62652 | Original stereo release.* |
| 1975 | CBS | LP | UK | S 33645 | Double album stereo reissue with Mr. Tambourine Man.* |
| 1976 | Embassy | LP | UK | EMB 31257 | Stereo reissue with alternative cover.* |
| 1977 | Embassy | LP | UK | CBS 31526 | Stereo reissue with alternative cover (different cover to above release).* |
| 1987 | Columbia | CD | US | CK 9254 | Original CD release. |
| 1989 | CBS | CD | Europe | 467046 2 | |
| 1993 | Columbia | CD | UK | COL 468180 | |
| April 30, 1996 | Columbia/Legacy | CD | US | CK 64846 | Reissue containing seven bonus tracks and a partially remixed version of the stereo album.* |
| May 6, 1996 | Columbia/Legacy | CD | UK | COL 4837062 | Reissue containing seven bonus tracks and a partially remixed version of the stereo album.* |
| 1999 | Simply Vinyl | LP | UK | SVLP 037 | Reissue of the partially remixed stereo album.* |
| 2003 | Sony | CD | Japan | MHCP-67 | Reissue containing seven bonus tracks and the partially remixed stereo album in a replica LP sleeve.* |
| 2006 | Sundazed | LP | US | LP 5198 | Reissue of the original mono release. |
* The album's title track and "He Was a Friend of Mine" were never mixed into stereo and appear in mono on all stereo releases of the album.

== Bibliography ==
- Rogan, Johnny, The Byrds: Timeless Flight Revisited, Rogan House, 1998, ISBN 0-9529540-1-X
- Hjort, Christopher, So You Want To Be A Rock 'n' Roll Star: The Byrds Day-By-Day (1965–1973), Jawbone Press, 2008, ISBN 1-906002-15-0.
- Einarson, John, Mr. Tambourine Man: The Life and Legacy of the Byrds' Gene Clark, Backbeat Books, ISBN 0-87930-793-5.
