= The Very Best of The Byrds =

Greatest hits album by the Byrds
- Released: June 23, 1997
- Recorded: January 1965 – June 1970
- Genre: Rock, jangle pop, folk rock, psychedelic rock, country rock
- Label: Columbia/Legacy
- Producer: Terry Melcher, Allen Stanton, Gary Usher, Bob Johnston

The Byrds chronology
Nashville West (1996)	The Very Best of The Byrds (1997)	Super Hits (1998)

Professional ratings
Review scores
Source	Rating
NME	7/10

The Very Best of The Byrds is a compilation album by the American rock band The Byrds, released by Columbia Records in 1997. Initially the compilation was only released in Europe and Canada but as of 2006, the album has seen some release in the U.S. The album contains a total of 27 songs, arranged in chronological order, that span the first five years of the band's career (1965 to 1970).

This particular compilation should not be confused with the 2006 compilation The Very Best of The Byrds. Although the 2006 compilation has the same title, it contains a different track listing and different cover artwork.

== Track listing ==
1. "Mr. Tambourine Man" (Bob Dylan) – 2:29
2. "All I Really Want to Do" (Bob Dylan) – 2:04
3. "Chimes of Freedom" (Bob Dylan) – 3:51
4. "I'll Feel a Whole Lot Better" (Gene Clark) – 2:32
5. "Turn! Turn! Turn! (To Everything There is a Season)" (Book of Ecclesiastes/Pete Seeger) – 3:49
6. "The Times They Are a-Changin'" (Bob Dylan) – 2:18
7. "The World Turns All Around Her" (Gene Clark) – 2:13
8. "It Won't Be Wrong" (Roger McGuinn, Harvey Gerst) – 1:58
9. "He Was a Friend of Mine" (traditional, new words and arrangement Roger McGuinn) – 2:30
10. "Eight Miles High" (Gene Clark, Roger McGuinn, David Crosby) – 3:34
11. "5D (Fifth Dimension)" (Roger McGuinn) – 2:33
12. "Mr. Spaceman" (Roger McGuinn) – 2:09
13. "So You Want to Be a Rock 'n' Roll Star" (Roger McGuinn, Chris Hillman) – 2:05
14. "My Back Pages" (Bob Dylan) – 3:08
15. "Renaissance Fair" (David Crosby, Roger McGuinn) – 1:51
16. "Goin' Back" (Carole King, Gerry Goffin) – 3:26
17. "Wasn't Born to Follow" (Carole King, Gerry Goffin) – 2:04
18. "Dolphin's Smile" (David Crosby, Chris Hillman, Roger McGuinn) – 2:00
19. "You Ain't Going Nowhere" (Bob Dylan) – 2:38
20. "One Hundred Years from Now" (Gram Parsons) – 2:43
21. "You're Still on My Mind" (Luke McDaniel) – 2:26
22. "Hickory Wind" (Gram Parsons, Bob Buchanan) – 3:34
23. "Ballad of Easy Rider" (Roger McGuinn, Bob Dylan) – 2:00
  - NOTE: Bob Dylan is not officially credited as a songwriter on "Ballad of Easy Rider".
24. "Jesus Is Just Alright" (Arthur Reynolds) – 2:10
25. "It's All Over Now, Baby Blue" (Bob Dylan) – 4:53
26. "Lay Lady Lay" (Bob Dylan) – 3:18
27. "Chestnut Mare" (Roger McGuinn, Jacques Levy) – 5:08

== Certifications ==
Certifications for The Very Best of The Byrds
Region	Certification	Certified units/sales
United Kingdom (BPI)	Gold	100,000^{‡}
^{‡} Sales+streaming figures based on certification alone.
