= If You're Gone =

If You're Gone may refer to:

- "If You're Gone" (Matchbox Twenty song), 2000
- "If You're Gone" (The Byrds song), 1965

== See also ==
- You're Gone (disambiguation)
