= It Won't Be Wrong =

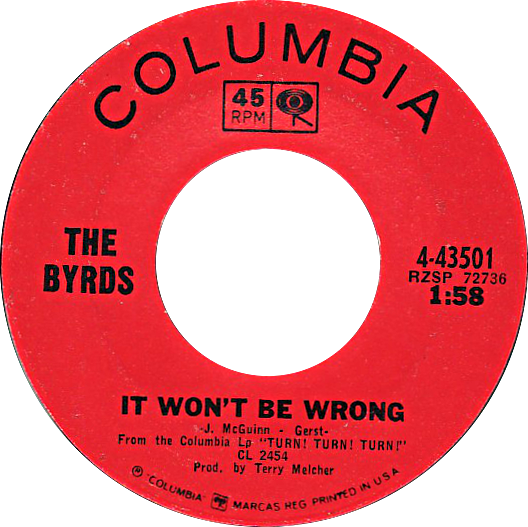
- Side label of the US vinyl release

Single by the Byrds

from the album Turn! Turn! Turn!
- A-side: "Set You Free This Time"
- Released: February 18, 1966
- Recorded: September 10 and 14–16, 1965
- Studio: Columbia, Hollywood, California
- Genre: Rock
- Length: 1:58
- Label: CBS
- Songwriter(s): Jim McGuinn, Harvey Gerst
- Producer(s): Terry Melcher

The Byrds singles chronology
"Turn! Turn! Turn!" (1965)	"Set You Free This Time" / "It Won't Be Wrong" (1966)	"Eight Miles High" (1966)

Alternative release
- 1966 Dutch picture sleeve of "Set You Free This Time/It Won't Be Wrong"

"It Won't Be Wrong" is a song by the American folk rock band the Byrds, which appeared as the second track on their 1965 album, Turn! Turn! Turn! It was also coupled with the song "Set You Free This Time" for a single release in 1966, resulting in "It Won't Be Wrong" charting at number 63 on the Billboard Hot 100. The song was written by Byrds band member Jim McGuinn and his friend Harvey Gerst in 1964.

== Composition and structure ==
"It Won't Be Wrong" was composed in 1964 by the Byrds lead guitarist Jim McGuinn and his friend Harvey Gerst, who was an acquaintance from McGuinn's days as a folk singer at The Troubadour folk club in West Hollywood, California. The song originally appeared with the alternate title of "Don't Be Long" on the B-side of a single that the Byrds had released on Elektra Records in October 1964, under the pseudonym the Beefeaters. By the time the song was re-recorded in September 1965, during the recording sessions for the Byrds' second Columbia Records' album, its title had been changed to "It Won't Be Wrong". Both the band and their producer Terry Melcher felt that the 1965 version included on the Turn! Turn! Turn! album was far more accomplished and exciting than the earlier Elektra recording of the song.

Lyrically, the song is a relatively simplistic appeal for a lover to submit to the singer's romantic advances. Musically, however, the guitar riff following each verse foreshadows the raga experimentation of the band's later songs "Eight Miles High" and "Why", both of which would be recorded within three months of "It Won't Be Wrong". The Byrds' biographer, Johnny Rogan, has described the difference between the earlier Beefeaters' recording of the song and The Byrds' Columbia version as remarkable. Rogan went on to state that the "lackluster Beefeaters' version was replaced by the driving beat of a Byrds rock classic, complete with strident guitars and improved harmonies, that transformed the sentiments of the song from an ineffectual statement to a passionate plea."

== Release ==
"It Won't Be Wrong" first appeared in December 1965 on the Byrds Turn! Turn! Turn! album. Following its appearance on the album, the song was selected as the B-side for the Byrds' "Set You Free This Time" single in January 1966. However, after initially poor sales of that single, Columbia Records in America began promoting the B-side instead, resulting in "It Won't Be Wrong" charting at number 63 on the Billboard Hot 100.

In the United Kingdom, "Set You Free This Time" was released as a single on February 11, 1966, but after the NME described the B-side as the best track on the single, it was re-released on February 18, 1966, with "It Won't Be Wrong" as the A-side. Johnny Rogan has speculated that this re-issuing of essentially the same single (albeit with its A-side and B-side transposed) twice within the space of two weeks, caused confusion among Radio DJs over which of the two songs they should play and contributed to the single's failure to chart in the UK.

Cash Box described it as a "pulsating, fast-moving blues- tinged romancer about a love-sick fella who begs his girl to give him half-a-chance."

== Legacy ==
The Byrds performed the song on the U.S. television programs Where The Action Is and Shivaree during 1966, but there is little evidence to suggest that the song was played regularly during the band's 1960s and 1970s live concerts. However, the song was performed by a reformed line-up of the Byrds featuring Roger McGuinn, David Crosby, and Chris Hillman in January 1989.

In addition to its appearance on the Byrds' second album, "It Won't Be Wrong" appears on several Byrds' compilations, including The Original Singles: 1965–1967, Volume 1, The Very Best of The Byrds, The Byrds, The Essential Byrds, There Is a Season, and the expanded and remastered edition of The Byrds' Greatest Hits. The original Elektra Records version of the song (titled "Don't Be Long") can be found on the albums In the Beginning, Byrd Parts, and The Preflyte Sessions, as well as on the There Is a Season box set.

The song was also recorded by David McCallum as an instrumental piece for his 1968 album Music... A Bit More of Me on Capitol Records. It was recorded by Jakob Dylan and Fiona Apple for the soundtrack of the documentary film Echo in the Canyon.

== Sources ==
- Hjort, Christopher (2008). So You Want To Be A Rock 'n' Roll Star: The Byrds Day-By-Day (1965-1973). Jawbone Press. ISBN 978-1-906002-15-2.
- Rogan, Johnny (1998). The Byrds: Timeless Flight Revisited (2nd ed.). Rogan House. ISBN 0-9529540-1-X.
- Whitburn, Joel (2008). Top Pop Singles 1955–2006. Record Research Inc. ISBN 978-0-89820-172-7.
