= If You're Gone (The Byrds song) =

Song by the Byrds

from the album Turn! Turn! Turn!
- Released: December 6, 1965
- Recorded: October 20, 1965
- Studio: Columbia Studios, Hollywood, California
- Genre: Folk rock
- Length: 2:45
- Label: Columbia
- Songwriter: Gene Clark
- Producer: Terry Melcher

"If You're Gone" is a song written by Gene Clark that was first released on the Byrds' 1965 album Turn! Turn! Turn!.

== Music and lyrics ==
"If You're Gone" is one of several songs written by Clark whose lyrics reveal his emotional insecurity and vulnerability. Allmusic critic Matthew Greenwald describes the melody as rising and falling gracefully but music critic Johnny Rogan feels it lacks the "melodic grace" of some of Clark's other compositions. It uses a triple meter, with a snare drum accent on the first beat of every other bar.

An unusual feature of the song is the harmony, in which a Gregorian chant-like vocal functions as a drone, sounding like an extra instrument similar to a bagpipe. Producer Terry Melcher credits Byrds' lead guitarist Roger McGuinn for coming up with the drone concept, stating that McGuinn "had this good idea for using a fifth harmony to create a droning effect, like that of a bagpipe or drum. On the album it really does sound like another instrument." Byrds biographer Christopher Hjort describes the backing vocal as "choir-like." Theodore Gracyk credits the song with being one of the first to use this type of effect, a few months after the Kinks uses a similar effect on their song "See My Friends." Melcher later adapted this drone idea for the Byrds' 1969 single "Jesus Is Just Alright."

== Recording ==
"If You're Gone" was recorded on October 20, 1965, at Columbia Recording Studio A in Hollywood, California. Melcher produced it and Hjort suggests that Ray Gerhardt was most likely the engineer.

== Reception ==
Greenwald describes "If You're Gone" as a "fine example of Gene Clark's growth as a songwriter." Fellow Allmusic critic Richie Unterberger describes it as a "strong composition." Clark biographer John Einarson described it as "indicative of [Clark's] expanding poetic vision" and one of the highlights of Turn! Turn! Turn!. Rolling Stone Album Guide contributor Rob Sheffield particularly praised the song particularly for its "devastated drone." Something Else! contributor Beverly Paterson described "If You're Gone" and another Clark composition on Turn! Turn! Turn!, "Set You Free This Time," as "stark ballads aching with regret." The song has also been described as "a song wholly in the conditional tense, a maze of lines that lead nowhere at all, a pointlessly remarkable achievement."
