= The Byrds (box set) =

Box set by the Byrds
- Released: October 19, 1990
- Recorded: January 20, 1965 – August 1971; February 24, 1990; August 6–8, 1990
- Studios: CBS Studios, New York
- Genres: Folk rock; country rock; psychedelic rock
- Length: 4:20:25
- Label: Columbia/Legacy
- Producers: Terry Melcher; Allen Stanton; Gary Usher; Bob Johnston; Jim Dickson; Chris Hinshaw; Chris Hinshaw; The Byrds; Don DeVito

Single-disc compilation

The Byrds is a four-CD box set by the American rock band the Byrds. It features music that had previously been released between the mid-1960s and early 1970s, along with a number of previously unreleased tracks and some new recordings from 1990. The box set was issued on October 19, 1990, by Columbia/Legacy and reached number 151 on the Billboard albums chart.

== Contents and history ==
The Byrds comprises 90 tracks and covers the band's career from 1965 to 1971 (a period when they were signed to Columbia Records) in roughly chronological order, but excludes material from their 1973 reunion album Byrds, which was released on Asylum Records. The Byrds' lead guitarist, Roger McGuinn, served as "musical consultant" during preparation of the set and also had a hand in deciding the final track listing. At the time of its release, The Byrds was the first box set by a defunct rock act to be issued by Columbia Records.

The compilation includes a number of rare and previously unreleased songs, many of which were later included as bonus tracks on the remastered editions of the band's individual albums. Of special interest to fans of both the Byrds and country rock pioneer Gram Parsons, was the inclusion of six previously unreleased tracks from the recording sessions of the Byrds' 1968 album, Sweetheart of the Rodeo. Of these unreleased tracks, the versions of "The Christian Life", "You Don't Miss Your Water", and "One Hundred Years from Now" featured their original Parsons' lead vocals, which had been removed and replaced by McGuinn and Hillman prior to the release of the album. Author Johnny Rogan has remarked that in the years since Sweetheart of the Rodeo was issued, these "lost" Parsons' vocals had become near-legendary among fans of the band and their inclusion on The Byrds provided a major selling point for the box set.

The set also includes six songs performed by a reunited line-up of the Byrds, featuring McGuinn and other original members David Crosby and Chris Hillman. Of these six songs, two were recorded live at the Roy Orbison Tribute Concert on February 24, 1990, and four are new studio recordings dating from August 1990. The two other original members of the Byrds, Gene Clark and Michael Clarke, who were both still living in 1990, did not participate in the reunion.

== Release and reception ==
While The Byrds does provide a detailed overview of the band's music, there has been some criticism from fans and critics concerning the absence of songs written by Clark, who was the band's principal songwriter in its early years. In particular, the exclusion of popular and highly regarded Clark-penned songs such as "Set You Free This Time" and "Here Without You" was interpreted by many fans as an attempt on McGuinn's part to downplay Clark's importance in the group. The additional failure of McGuinn to mention Clark in the box set's booklet, while at the same time praising Crosby and Hillman, served to reinforce the notion that Clark was being intentionally slighted.

Upon release, the box set reached number 151 on the Billboard Top Pop Albums chart in the U.S., during a chart stay of four weeks, but failed to reach the UK Albums Chart. A single disc selection from the box set, titled 20 Essential Tracks from the Boxed Set: 1965–1990, was also released in January 1992. The first 16 tracks on this single disc collection date from the Byrds' 1965 to 1971 period, while the final 4 tracks are from the 1990 reunion.

The Byrds is currently out of print, but a later revised box set, titled There Is a Season, was released on September 26, 2006, by Columbia/Legacy. While this second box set is meant to replace The Byrds, each set contains some tracks that the other does not.

== Track listing ==
NOTES:

- Tracks marked ‡ are previously unreleased.
- Tracks marked ø are previously unreleased alternate versions of songs that appeared on the band's albums.
- Tracks marked # are previously unreleased remixes.
- Tracks marked † are outtakes, remixes or alternate versions that had previously only appeared on the Never Before compilation.

=== Disc one (We Have Ignition) ===
1. "Mr. Tambourine Man" (Bob Dylan) – 2:29 †
2. "I'll Feel a Whole Lot Better" (Gene Clark) – 2:31
3. "Chimes of Freedom" (Bob Dylan) – 3:50
4. "She Has a Way" (Gene Clark) – 2:30 †
5. "All I Really Want to Do" [LP version] (Bob Dylan) – 2:03
6. "Spanish Harlem Incident" (Bob Dylan) – 1:57
7. "The Bells of Rhymney" (Idris Davies, Pete Seeger) – 3:31
8. "It's All Over Now, Baby Blue" (Bob Dylan) – 2:56 †
9. "She Don't Care About Time" (Gene Clark) – 2:31 ø
10. "Turn! Turn! Turn! (to Everything There Is a Season)" (Book of Ecclesiastes/Pete Seeger) – 3:54 #
11. "It Won't Be Wrong" (Roger McGuinn, Harvey Gerst) – 1:57 #
12. "Lay Down Your Weary Tune" (Bob Dylan) – 3:30 #
13. "He Was a Friend of Mine" (traditional, new words and arrangement Roger McGuinn) – 2:10
14. "The World Turns All Around Her" (Gene Clark) – 2:14 #
15. "The Day Walk (Never Before)" (Gene Clark) – 3:00 †
16. "The Times They Are a-Changin'" (Bob Dylan) – 2:18 #
17. "5D (Fifth Dimension)" (Roger McGuinn) – 2:34 #
18. "I Know My Rider" (traditional, arranged Roger McGuinn, Gene Clark, David Crosby) – 2:44 †
19. "Eight Miles High" (Gene Clark, David Crosby, Roger McGuinn) – 3:34
20. "Why" (David Crosby, Roger McGuinn) – 2:58 †
21. "Psychodrama City" (David Crosby) – 3:24 †
22. "I See You" (David Crosby, Roger McGuinn) – 2:37 #
23. "Hey Joe" (Billy Roberts) – 2:25 #

=== Disc two (Cruising Altitude) ===
1. "Mr. Spaceman" (Roger McGuinn) – 2:10 #
2. "John Riley" (Bob Gibson, Ricky Neff) – 2:59 #
3. "Roll Over Beethoven" [Live] (Chuck Berry) – 2:11 ‡
4. "So You Want to Be a Rock 'n' Roll Star" (Chris Hillman, Roger McGuinn) – 2:05
5. "Have You Seen Her Face" (Chris Hillman) – 2:43 #
6. "My Back Pages" (Bob Dylan) – 3:08
7. "Time Between" (Chris Hillman) – 1:54 #
8. "It Happens Each Day" (David Crosby) – 2:44 †
9. "Renaissance Fair" (David Crosby, Roger McGuinn) – 1:51 #
10. "Everybody's Been Burned" (David Crosby) – 3:06 #
11. "The Girl With No Name" (Chris Hillman) – 1:49 #
12. "Triad" (David Crosby) – 3:29 †
13. "Lady Friend" (David Crosby) – 2:35 #
14. "Old John Robertson" [Single version] (Chris Hillman, Roger McGuinn) – 1:49
15. "Goin' Back" [LP version] (Gerry Goffin, Carole King) – 3:27
16. "Draft Morning" (David Crosby, Chris Hillman, Roger McGuinn) – 2:38
17. "Wasn't Born to Follow" (Gerry Goffin, Carole King) – 2:02
18. "Dolphin's Smile" (David Crosby, Chris Hillman, Roger McGuinn) – 1:59
19. "Reputation" (Tim Hardin) – 3:08 ‡
20. "You Ain't Goin' Nowhere" (Bob Dylan) – 2:33
21. "The Christian Life" (Charlie Louvin, Ira Louvin) – 2:28 ø
22. "I Am a Pilgrim" (traditional, arranged Roger McGuinn, Chris Hillman) – 3:37
23. "Pretty Boy Floyd" (Woody Guthrie) – 2:34
24. "You Don't Miss Your Water" (William Bell) – 3:49 ø

=== Disc three (Full Throttle) ===
1. "Hickory Wind" (Gram Parsons, Bob Buchanan) – 3:29
2. "Nothing Was Delivered" (Bob Dylan) – 3:22
3. "One Hundred Years from Now" (Gram Parsons) – 2:56 ø
4. "Pretty Polly" (traditional, arranged Chris Hillman, Roger McGuinn) – 2:53 ‡
5. "Lazy Days" (Gram Parsons) – 3:27 ‡
6. "This Wheel's on Fire" (Bob Dylan, Rick Danko) – 4:40 #
7. "Nashville West" (Gene Parsons, Clarence White) – 2:28
8. "Old Blue" (traditional, arranged Roger McGuinn) – 3:21
9. "Drug Store Truck Drivin' Man" (Roger McGuinn, Gram Parsons) – 3:53
10. "Bad Night at the Whiskey" (Roger McGuinn, Joseph Richards) – 3:20
11. "Lay Lady Lay" (Bob Dylan) – 3:16 ø
12. "Mae Jean Goes to Hollywood" (Jackson Browne) – 2:43 ‡
13. "Ballad of Easy Rider" (Roger McGuinn, Bob Dylan) – 2:02
  - NOTE: Bob Dylan is not officially credited as a songwriter on "Ballad of Easy Rider".
14. "Oil in My Lamp" (traditional, arranged Gene Parsons, Clarence White) – 2:02 ø
15. "Jesus Is Just Alright" (Arthur Reynolds) – 2:08
16. "Way Beyond the Sun" (traditional, arranged Roger McGuinn) – 2:56 ‡
17. "Tulsa County" [aka "Tulsa County Blue"] (Pamela Polland) – 2:46
18. "Deportee (Plane Wreck at Los Gatos)" (Woody Guthrie, Martin Hoffman) – 3:50
19. "Lover of the Bayou" [Live] (Roger McGuinn, Jacques Levy) – 4:24 ø
20. "Willin'" [Live] (Lowell George) – 3:13 ‡
21. "Black Mountain Rag" [Live] (Byron Berline/arranged Clarence White, Roger McGuinn) – 1:12 ‡
22. "Positively 4th Street" [Live] (Bob Dylan) – 3:04

=== Disc four (Final Approach) ===
1. "Chestnut Mare" (Roger McGuinn, Jacques Levy) – 5:07
2. "Just a Season" (Roger McGuinn, Jacques Levy) – 3:49 #
3. "Kathleen's Song" (Roger McGuinn, Jacques Levy) – 2:35 ø
4. "Truck Stop Girl" (Lowell George, Bill Payne) – 3:20
5. "Just Like a Woman" (Bob Dylan) – 3:58 ‡
6. "Stanley's Song" (Roger McGuinn, Robert J. Hippard) – 3:11 ‡
7. "Glory, Glory" (Arthur Reynolds) – 4:00
8. "I Trust" (Roger McGuinn) – 3:17
9. "I Wanna Grow Up to Be a Politician" (Roger McGuinn, Jacques Levy) – 2:01
10. "Green Apple Quick Step" (Gene Parsons, Clarence White) – 1:47
11. "Tiffany Queen" (Roger McGuinn) – 2:41
12. "Bugler" (Larry Murray) – 3:05
13. "Lazy Waters" (Bob Rafkin) – 3:32
14. "Farther Along" (traditional, arranged Clarence White) – 2:57
15. "White's Lightning" (Roger McGuinn, Clarence White) – 2:36 ‡
16. "Turn! Turn! Turn! (to Everything There Is a Season)" [Live] (Book of Ecclesiastes/Pete Seeger) – 3:51 ø
  - Recorded live at the Roy Orbison Tribute Concert on February 24, 1990.
17. "Mr. Tambourine Man" [Live] (Bob Dylan) – 5:26 ø
  - Recorded live at the Roy Orbison Tribute Concert on February 24, 1990.
18. "He Was a Friend of Mine" (traditional, new words and arrangement Roger McGuinn) – 2:26 ø
19. "Paths of Victory" (Bob Dylan) – 3:09 ‡
20. "From a Distance" (Julie Gold) – 3:14 ‡
21. "Love That Never Dies" (Roger McGuinn, Stan Lynch) – 3:54 ‡
  - The above four tracks were recorded by a reunited line-up of the Byrds at Treasure Isle Recorders, Nashville, Tennessee, between August 6 and August 8, 1990.

== 20 Essential Tracks from the Boxed Set: 1965-1990 track listing ==
1. "Mr. Tambourine Man" (Bob Dylan) – 2:29
  - NOTE: New wide stereo remix from the 8-track session tape. The box set used the Never Before remix.
2. "I'll Feel a Whole Lot Better" (Gene Clark) – 2:32
3. "All I Really Want to Do" (Bob Dylan) – 2:04
4. "Turn! Turn! Turn! (To Everything There Is A Season)" (Book of Ecclesiastes/Pete Seeger) – 3:49
5. "5D (Fifth Dimension)" (Roger McGuinn) – 2:33
6. "Eight Miles High" (Gene Clark, Roger McGuinn, David Crosby) – 3:34
7. "Mr. Spaceman" (Roger McGuinn) – 2:09
8. "So You Want to Be a Rock 'n' Roll Star" (Roger McGuinn, Chris Hillman) – 1:50
9. "Have You Seen Her Face" (Chris Hillman) – 2:42
10. "Lady Friend" (David Crosby) – 2:35
11. "My Back Pages" (Bob Dylan) – 3:08
12. "Goin' Back" (Carole King, Gerry Goffin) – 3:26
13. "Ballad of Easy Rider" (Roger McGuinn, Bob Dylan) – 2:02
  - NOTE: Bob Dylan is not officially credited as a songwriter on "Ballad of Easy Rider".
14. "Jesus Is Just Alright" (Arthur Reynolds) – 2:09
15. "Chestnut Mare" (Roger McGuinn, Jacques Levy) – 5:06
16. "I Wanna Grow up to Be a Politician" (Roger McGuinn, Jacques Levy) – 2:02
17. "He Was a Friend of Mine" (traditional, new words and arrangement Roger McGuinn) – 2:26
18. "Paths of Victory" (Bob Dylan) – 3:10
19. "From a Distance" (Julie Gold) – 3:14
20. "Love That Never Dies" (Roger McGuinn, Stan Lynch) – 3:55
