= The Original Singles: 1965–1967, Volume 1 =

Compilation album by the Byrds
- Released: 1980
- Recorded: 1965–1966
- Genre: Rock
- Length: 41:24
- Label: Columbia
- Producers: Terry Melcher, Allen Stanton, Gary Usher

The Byrds chronology
The Byrds Play Dylan (1980)	The Original Singles: 1965–1967, Volume 1 (1980)	The Original Singles: 1967-1969, Volume 2 (1982)

The Original Singles: 1965–1967, Volume 1 is a compilation album by American rock 'n' roll band the Byrds. Originally released in 1980, it offered, for the first time, all of the mono single versions of the Byrds' singles released between 1965 and early 1967. The tracks on the album are laid out chronologically by release date of the single, and features the A-side first, then the B-side. For example, the Byrds' first single was "Mr. Tambourine Man" with "I Knew I'd Want You" on the B-side. The next single was "All I Really Want to Do" with "I'll Feel a Whole Lot Better" on the B-side, and so forth.

== Sound quality ==
Some fans consider the sound quality of the recording, most notably on CD to be substandard. Although the 1980 album was acclaimed upon release, there were many complaints about the CD version. While the first UK version used single mono mixes sent from Columbia's studios, this was not the case with the CD version later issued in the USA. Compiler and Byrds biographer Johnny Rogan (whose liner notes appeared on all issued) was not involved in the CD version which clearly did not include the original version of 'Why' (the B-side of 'Eight Miles High') but instead featured the version from 1967's "Younger Than Yesterday".

== Track listing ==
=== Side 1 ===
All tracks are in mono. They were all previously released on 45 RPM singles and most of them were also released on the mono versions of the Byrds' LPs Mr. Tambourine Man, Turn! Turn! Turn!, Fifth Dimension or Younger Than Yesterday.

1. "Mr. Tambourine Man" (Bob Dylan) - 2:20
2. "I Knew I'd Want You" (Gene Clark) - 2:14
3. "All I Really Want to Do" (Bob Dylan) - 2:03
4. "I'll Feel a Whole Lot Better" (Gene Clark) - 2:32
5. "Turn! Turn! Turn! (To Everything There Is a Season)" (Ecclesiastes/Pete Seeger) - 3:37
6. "She Don't Care About Time" (Gene Clark) - 2:30
7. "Set You Free This Time" (Gene Clark) - 2:50
8. "It Won't Be Wrong" (Roger McGuinn, Harvey Gerst) - 1:58

=== Side 2 ===
1. "Eight Miles High" (Gene Clark, Roger McGuinn, David Crosby) - 3:35
2. "Why" (Roger McGuinn, David Crosby) - 3:01
3. "5D (Fifth Dimension)" (Roger McGuinn) - 2:34
4. "Captain Soul" (Roger McGuinn, Chris Hillman, Michael Clarke, David Crosby) - 2:35
5. "Mr. Spaceman" (Roger McGuinn) - 2:09
6. "What's Happening?!?!" (David Crosby) - 2:33
7. "So You Want to Be a Rock 'n' Roll Star" (Roger McGuinn, Chris Hillman) - 2:05
8. "Everybody's Been Burned" (David Crosby) - 3:02

=== Track notes ===
- The single version of "All I Really Want to Do" (featured on this album) is a completely different recording than the version released on the mono and stereo versions of the Mr. Tambourine Man album.
- "She Don't Care About Time" appeared on the B-side of the "Turn! Turn! Turn!" single, but was never included on a Byrds studio album.
- The single version of "Why" (featured on this album) is a completely different recording than the version released on the mono and stereo versions of the Younger Than Yesterday album.
  - The LP release of The Original Singles: 1965–1967, Volume 1 contains this single version of "Why", but the CD release, in error, includes the mono album version of "Why" (from Younger Than Yesterday) rather than the single version.
