= When You're Gone =

When You're Gone may refer to:

- "When You're Gone" (Avril Lavigne song), 2007
- "When You're Gone" (Bryan Adams song), 1998
- "When You're Gone" (The Cranberries song), 1996
- When You're Gone (Jesse Stewart), 2017
- When You're Gone (Shawn Mendes song), 2022
- "When You're Gone", a US bonus song on Richard Marx's 2004 album My Own Best Enemy
- "When You Are Gone", a 1968 song by Jim Reeves

== See also ==
- You're Gone (disambiguation)
