= Turn! Turn! Turn! =

Song by Pete Seeger

"Turn! Turn! Turn!", also known as or subtitled "To Everything There Is a Season", is a song written by Pete Seeger. Most sources date the song's composition to 1959, but according to Seeger's own account, near the end of his life, he composed the song in 1954. The lyrics – except for the title, which is repeated throughout the song, and the final two lines – consist of the first eight verses of the third chapter of the biblical Book of Ecclesiastes. The song was originally released in 1962 as "To Everything There Is a Season" on the folk group the Limeliters' album Folk Matinee, and then some months later on Seeger's own The Bitter and the Sweet.

The song became an international hit in late 1965 when it was adapted by the American folk rock group the Byrds. The single entered the U.S. chart at number 80 on October 23, 1965, before reaching number one on the Billboard Hot 100 chart on December 4, 1965. In Canada, it reached number 3 on November 29, 1965, and also peaked at number 26 on the UK Singles Chart.

== Lyrics ==
The lyrics are taken almost verbatim from the book of Ecclesiastes, as found in the King James Version of the Bible. Ecclesiastes is traditionally ascribed to King Solomon, who would have written it in the 10th century BC, though modern scholarship dates its composition much later, up to the third century BC. The Biblical text posits there being a time and place for all things:

To every thing there is a season, and a time to every purpose under the heaven:
A time to be born, and a time to die; a time to plant, and a time to pluck up that which is planted;
A time to kill, and a time to heal; a time to break down, and a time to build up;
A time to weep, and a time to laugh; a time to mourn, and a time to dance;
A time to cast away stones, and a time to gather stones together;
A time to embrace, and a time to refrain from embracing;
A time to get, and a time to lose; a time to keep, and a time to cast away;
A time to rend, and a time to sew; a time to keep silence, and a time to speak;
A time to love, and a time to hate; a time of war, and a time of peace.

— Ecclesiastes 3:1-8

The lines appear out of order in Seeger's song and are open to myriad interpretations. In the song, they appear as a plea for world peace with the closing line: "a time for peace, I swear it's not too late." This line and the title phrase "Turn! Turn! Turn!" are the only parts of the lyric written by Seeger himself.

In 1999, Seeger arranged for 45% of the songwriting royalties for "Turn! Turn! Turn!" to be donated to the Israeli Committee Against House Demolitions. He kept 50% of the royalties for his own music and took a further 5% for the lyrics because, in Seeger's own words, "[in addition to the music] I did write six words and one more word repeated three times." (Note: In a 2002 interview with Acoustic Guitar magazine, Pete Seeger said, "All around the world, songs are being written that use old public domain material, and I think it's only fair that some of the money from the songs go to the country or place of origin, even though the composer may be long dead or unknown. With 'Turn, Turn, Turn' I wanted to send 45 percent, because [in addition to the music] I did write six words and one more word repeated three times, so I figured I'd keep five percent of the royalties for the words. I was going to send it to London, where I am sure the committee that oversees the use of the King James version exists, and they probably could use a little cash. But then I realized, why not send it to where the words were originally written?") Seeger's handwritten lyrics to the song were among documents donated to New York University by the Communist Party USA in March 2007.

The song is notable for being one of a few instances in popular music in which a large portion of the Bible is set to music, other examples being the Melodians' (and Boney M's) "Rivers of Babylon", Sister Janet Mead's "The Lord's Prayer", U2's "40", Sinéad O'Connor's "Psalm 33" and Cliff Richard's "The Millennium Prayer". Since Ecclesiastes is traditionally ascribed to King Solomon in the 10th century BC, the Byrds' 1965 recording of the song holds the distinction in the U.S. of being the number 1 hit with the oldest lyrics.

The song was published in illustrated book form by Simon & Schuster in September 2003, with an accompanying CD that contained both Seeger's and the Byrds' recordings of the song. Wendy Anderson Halperin created a set of detailed illustrations for each set of opposites that are reminiscent of mandalas. The book also includes the Ecclesiastes text from the King James version of the Bible.

== Renditions ==
=== Early folk versions ===
The song was first released by the folk group the Limeliters on their 1962 album Folk Matinee, under the title "To Everything There Is a Season". The Limeliters' version predated the release of Seeger's own version by several months. One of the Limeliters' backing musicians at this time was Jim McGuinn (a.k.a. Roger McGuinn), who would later record the song with his band the Byrds and, prior to that, arrange the song for folk singer Judy Collins on her 1963 album Judy Collins 3. Collins' recording of the song was retitled as "Turn! Turn! Turn! (To Everything There Is a Season)", a title that would be retained by the Byrds, though it was shortened to "Turn! Turn! Turn!" on the front cover of the album of the same name and the song became generally known by the shorter version, appearing as such on most later Byrds compilations.

In 1963, Marlene Dietrich recorded "Für alles kommt die Zeit (Glaub, Glaub)", Max Colpet's German translation of the song. Dietrich was backed by a Burt Bacharach–conducted studio orchestra, and the song was released as a single.

=== The Byrds' version ===
"Turn! Turn! Turn!"
- West German picture sleeve

Single by the Byrds

from the album Turn! Turn! Turn!
- B-side: "She Don't Care About Time"
- Released: October 1, 1965
- Recorded: September 1, 10 and 14–16, 1965
- Studio: Columbia, Hollywood
- Genre: Folk rock; jangle pop
- Length: 3:49
- Label: Columbia
- Songwriter: Pete Seeger (words from the Book of Ecclesiastes)
- Producer: Terry Melcher

The Byrds singles chronology
"All I Really Want to Do" (1965)	"Turn! Turn! Turn!" (1965)	"Set You Free This Time" / "It Won't Be Wrong" (1966)

Audio
- "Turn! Turn! Turn! (To Everything There Is a Season)" on YouTube

"Turn! Turn! Turn!" was adapted by the Byrds in a folk rock arrangement and released as a single by Columbia Records on October 1, 1965. The song was also included on the band's second album, Turn! Turn! Turn!, which was released on December 6, 1965. The Byrds' single is the most successful recorded version of the song, having reached number 1 on the US Billboard Hot 100 charts and number 26 on the UK Singles Chart. The B-side of the single was band member Gene Clark's original composition "She Don't Care About Time".

In 2001, the 1965 recording of the song was inducted into the Grammy Hall of Fame. In 2026, "Turn! Turn! Turn!" was selected by the Library of Congress for preservation in the National Recording Registry for its "cultural, historical or aesthetic importance in the nation's recorded sound heritage."

"Turn! Turn! Turn!" had first been arranged by the Byrds' lead guitarist Jim McGuinn in a chamber-folk style during sessions for Judy Collins' 1963 album Judy Collins 3. The idea of reviving the song came to McGuinn during the Byrds' July 1965 tour of the American Midwest, when his future wife, Dolores, requested the tune on the Byrds' tour bus. The rendering that McGuinn dutifully played came out sounding not like a folk song but more like a rock/folk hybrid, perfectly in keeping with the Byrds' status as pioneers of the folk rock genre. McGuinn explained, "It was a standard folk song by that time, but I played it and it came out rock 'n' roll because that's what I was programmed to do like a computer. I couldn't do it as it was traditionally. It came out with that samba beat, and we thought it would make a good single." The master recording of the song reportedly took the Byrds 78 takes, spread over five days of recording, to complete.

Music journalist William Ruhlmann has pointed out that the song's plea for peace and tolerance struck a nerve with the American record buying public as the Vietnam War escalated. The single also solidified folk rock as a chart trend and, like the band's previous hits, continued the Byrds' successful mix of vocal harmony and jangly twelve-string Rickenbacker guitar playing. Billboard described the song as a "fascinating entry with words from the Book of Ecclesiastes and music adapted by Pete Seeger" that is "performed with respect and taste and a solid dance beat backing." Cash Box described it as a "tip-top version" of Seeger's original and said that the Byrds read "the lyrical folk item in an appropriate emotion-packed style." Pete Seeger expressed his approval of the Byrds' rendering of the song.

During 1965 and 1966, the band performed the song on the television programs Hollywood A Go-Go, Shindig!, The Ed Sullivan Show, and Where the Action Is, as well as in the concert film The Big T.N.T. Show. Additionally, the song would go on to become a staple of the Byrds' live concert repertoire, until their final disbandment in 1973. The song was also performed live by a re-formed line-up of the Byrds featuring Roger McGuinn, David Crosby and Chris Hillman in January 1989. In addition to its appearance on the Turn! Turn! Turn! album, the song also appears on several Byrds compilations, including The Byrds' Greatest Hits, History of The Byrds, The Original Singles: 1965–1967, Volume 1, The Byrds, 20 Essential Tracks From The Boxed Set: 1965-1990, The Very Best of The Byrds, The Essential Byrds and There Is a Season.

The recording has been featured in numerous movies and TV shows, including 1983's Heart Like a Wheel, 1994's Forrest Gump, and 2002's In America. Following Joe Cocker's cover of "With a Little Help from My Friends", the song was the first to be played in the initial episode of the television series The Wonder Years. It was also used in a Wonder Years parody, during The Simpsons episode "Three Men and a Comic Book". In 2003, it was used in the closing sequence of the Cold Case episode "A Time to Hate" (season one, episode 7) and for the closing credits of episode 3 of Ken Burns and Lynn Novick's 2017 documentary The Vietnam War.

Personnel

- Jim McGuinn – 12-string lead guitar, lead vocals
- Gene Clark – tambourine, harmony vocals
- David Crosby – rhythm guitar, harmony vocals
- Chris Hillman – electric bass
- Michael Clarke – drums

== Chart history ==
=== Weekly charts ===
The Byrds

Chart (1965–1966)	Peak position
Canada Top Singles (RPM)	3
Finland (Soumen Virallinen)	39
Germany	8
Netherlands (Single Top 100)	15
New Zealand (Lever Hit Parade)	1
UK Singles (OCC)	26
US Billboard Hot 100	1
US Cash Box Top 100	1

Judy Collins

Chart (1969)	Peak position
Canada RPM Adult Contemporary	32
Canada RPM Top Singles	44
US Billboard Hot 100	69
US Billboard Easy Listening	28
US Cash Box Top 100	58

=== Year-end charts ===
Chart (1965)	Rank
US (Joel Whitburn's Pop Annual)	3

Chart (1966)	Rank
US Cash Box	33

== Certifications ==
Region	Certification	Certified units/sales
New Zealand (RMNZ)	Gold	15,000^{‡}
^{‡} Sales+streaming figures based on certification alone.

=== Other well-known cover versions ===
The song has been covered by many other artists:

- Mary Hopkin won the television talent show Opportunity Knocks in 1968 singing her cover of the song. She recorded it as the B-side to her debut single, "Those Were the Days", also in 1968. She also recorded a Welsh-language version of the song: "Tro, tro, tro".
- Judy Collins covered the song in 1963. Her version was reissued as a single in 1969. It became a Top 40 hit in Canada and on the U.S. Easy Listening chart.
- Dolly Parton recorded it in 1984 for her The Great Pretender album, and again in 2005 for Those Were the Days; on Parton's 2005 recording of the song, she was joined by McGuinn, who played guitar and provided harmony vocals.
- Dick Gaughan recorded the song in 1998 for his album Redwood Cathedral.
- Japanese rock band Plastic Tree released a cover of the song with Japanese lyrics titled "Inori (祈り; A Prayer)" on their 1999 single "Tremolo (トレモロ)", which was used as the theme song for the TV show "Kyōji no omezamewaido (教児のおめざめワイド)".
- McGuinn, Parton, Marty Stuart, and Kathy Mattea performed the song together in the 2003 movie Our Country.
- McGuinn, Emmylou Harris, and Ricky Skaggs cut a new version for the soundtrack and ending credits of the 2014 film The Song.

== See also ==
- List of anti-war songs
