= You're Gone =

You're Gone may refer to:

- "You're Gone" (Diamond Rio song), 1998
- "You're Gone" (Marillion song), 2004
- You're Gone, song by Del Amitri on Waking Hours album

== See also ==
- If You're Gone (disambiguation)
- When You're Gone (disambiguation)
