= Judy Collins 3 =

Judy Collins #3

Studio album by Judy Collins
- Released: December 1963
- Studio: Mastertone Recording, New York City
- Genre: Folk
- Label: Elektra
- Producer: Mark Abramson, Jac Holzman

Judy Collins chronology
Golden Apples of the Sun (1962)	Judy Collins #3 (1963)	The Judy Collins Concert (1964)

Professional ratings
Review scores
Source	Rating
AllMusic	3/5 stars
The Encyclopedia of Popular Music	3/5 stars
The Rolling Stone Album Guide	3/5 stars

Judy Collins #3 is the third studio album by the American singer and songwriter Judy Collins. It was issued by Elektra Records in December 1963. It spent 10 weeks on the Billboard Pop album charts in 1964, peaking at No. 126.

Jim (later Roger) McGuinn worked as an arranger and played guitar and banjo on the album. He would later bring with him the acoustic arrangements of the Pete Seeger songs "Turn! Turn! Turn! (To Everything There Is a Season)" and "The Bells of Rhymney", as well as the notion of performing and recording alternate, abstracted versions of Bob Dylan songs, when he went on to co-found the folk rock group the Byrds.

== Track listing ==
Side one

1. "Anathea" (Neil Roth, Lydia Wood) – 4:00
2. "Bullgine Run" (Traditional) – 2:05
3. "Farewell" (Bob Dylan) – 3:25
4. "Hey Nelly Nelly" (Shel Silverstein, Jim Friedman) – 2:46
5. "Ten O'Clock All Is Well" (Hamilton Camp, Bob Gibson) – 3:43
6. "The Dove" (Ewan MacColl) – 2:12
7. "Masters of War" (Dylan) – 3:21

Side two

1. "In the Hills of Shiloh" (Silverstein, Friedman) – 3:35
2. "The Bells of Rhymney" (Idris Davies, Pete Seeger) – 4:04
3. "Deportee" (Woody Guthrie, Martin Hoffman) – 4:35
4. "Settle Down" (Mike Settle) – 2:21
5. "Come Away Melinda" (Fran Minkoff, Fred Hellerman) – 2:45
6. "Turn! Turn! Turn! / To Everything There Is a Season" (Ecclesiastes, Seeger) – 3:35

== Personnel ==
- Judy Collins – guitar, keyboards, vocals

Additional musicians

- Walter Raim – 12-string guitar ("Bells of Rhymney" and "Hey Nelly Nelly"); banjo ("In the Hills of Shiloh")
- Jim McGuinn – second guitar, banjo
- Bill Takas – double bass

Technical

- Mark Abramson – co-producer
- Jac Holzman – co-producer
- William S. Harvey – cover design
- Jim Marshall – cover photo
- Jim McGuinn – arrangements (all tracks except "Bells of Rhymney" and "Hey Nelly Nelly")
- Walter Raim – arrangements ("Bells of Rhymney" and "Hey Nelly Nelly")
- Judy Collins – liner notes

== Charts ==
Chart performance for Judy Collins 3
Chart (1964)	Peak position
US Top LP's (Billboard)	126
