= He Was a Friend of Mine =

Traditional folk song

Song
- Written: Unknown
- Songwriter: Traditional

"He Was a Friend of Mine" is a traditional folk song in which the singer laments the death of a friend. Ethnomusicologist Alan Lomax was the first to collect the song, in 1939, describing it as a "blues" that was "a dirge for a dead comrade."

The Byrds issued a reworded version of the song in 1965, with lyrics that lament the assassination of John F. Kennedy. Since then, other artists have adapted the lyrics to talk about different murders, including those of John Lennon and George Floyd.

== Early recordings ==
The earliest known version of the song is titled "Shorty George" (Roud 10055). A performance by African-American inmate Smith Casey, who accompanied himself on guitar, was first recorded by musicologist couple John and Ruby Terrill Lomax in 1939 at the Clemens State Farm in Brazoria County, Texas.

The first professional singer to pick up the song from the Library of Congress recordings was Rolf Cahn. He recorded the song on his 1961 Folkways album Rolf Cahn & Eric von Schmidt, where the song was titled "He Was a Friend of Mine" for the first time.

Bob Dylan picked up the song from the Cahn recording and made some changes to it when he recorded it for his debut album Bob Dylan on November 20, 1961. However, Dylan's recording was not included on the album. It did show up on various Dylan bootleg albums, which received wide distribution soon thereafter. That recording of the song eventually had its official release in 1991 on volume 1 of Columbia Records' Dylan Bootleg Series.

When Dave van Ronk recorded Dylan's version of the song on his 1962 Prestige album Dave Van Ronk, Folksinger, he incorrectly credited Dylan as the song's author.

== The Byrds' version ==
"He Was a Friend of Mine"

Song by the Byrds

from the album Turn! Turn! Turn!
- Released: December 6, 1965
- Recorded: November 1, 1965
- Studio: Columbia, Hollywood, California
- Genre: Folk rock, folk
- Length: 2:30
- Label: Columbia
- Songwriters: Traditional, new words and arrangement Jim McGuinn
- Producer: Terry Melcher

The Byrds included a reworded version of "He Was a Friend of Mine" on their 1965 album Turn! Turn! Turn!. In the band's version, the song's melody is altered and the lyrics are changed to lament the assassination of John F. Kennedy. The Byrds' lead guitarist Jim McGuinn rewrote the song's lyrics in late 1963 to give it a more contemporary slant and transform it into a eulogy for President Kennedy. McGuinn explained the origins of the song in an interview: "I wrote the song the night John F. Kennedy was assassinated. I suppose you could say it's one of the earliest Byrds songs. The arrangement used was as I'd always sung it. I just thought it was a good idea to include it on the Turn! Turn! Turn! album." Due to the rewritten lyrics, the songwriting credit for the song is "Traditional/new words and arrangement McGuinn".

Following its appearance on the band's second album, the song would go on to become a staple of the Byrds' live concert repertoire. The band performed the song during their appearance at the Monterey Pop Festival on June 17, 1967, where band member David Crosby made controversial remarks alleging that Kennedy had not been killed by Lee Harvey Oswald alone, but was shot from multiple directions. The Byrds' performance of "He Was a Friend of Mine" at Monterey was included in the 2002 The Complete Monterey Pop Festival DVD box set.

In 1990, a reformed line-up of the Byrds, featuring McGuinn, Crosby, and Chris Hillman, re-recorded the song for The Byrds box set.

== Other versions ==
The song has since been recorded by many artists, including the Washington Squares, Bobby Bare, Mercury Rev, the Black Crowes, the Mitchell Trio, Willie Nelson, Nanci Griffith, Cat Power, and the Leaves. The version recorded by Willie Nelson was used in the film Brokeback Mountain and erroneously credits Bob Dylan as the songwriter. The Country Gentlemen also recorded a bluegrass version of the song on their The Country Gentlemen Play It Like It Is album in 1969.

In 1963, the Greenbriar Boys recorded "He Was a Friend of Mine" with singer Dian James on their Elektra Records album Dian & the Greenbriar Boys. The Briarwood Singers, a five-piece folk group, released a version of the song that reached number 126 on the Billboard charts in December 1963. Bobby Bare also recorded "He Was a Friend of Mine" in 1964, in memory of air crash victim Jim Reeves. That same year, Petula Clark released a French version of the song under the title "Toi qui m'as fait pleurer" ("You, who have made me cry"), with Bobby Bare credited as the writer.

Stephen Stills' band Manassas covered "He Was a Friend of Mine" during a 1972 performance at the Concertgebouw in Amsterdam, Netherlands, which was released in 2017 as the Live Treasure album. Tom Goodkind of the Washington Squares sang the song with Marco Sin of Dirty Looks on bass and Billy Ficca of Television on drums at NYC's Paladium as a tribute to friend Abbie Hoffman. Dave Van Ronk sang the song at the memorial concert for Phil Ochs in New York City's Madison Square Garden Felt Forum, in May 1976, after Ochs' suicide. Ramblin' Jack Elliott and Jerry Jeff Walker sing a duet version on Elliott's 1998 album Friends of Mine, and Walker includes it in his 1996 album Scamp. American actor Billy Bob Thornton included a cover of the Byrds' version of the song on his 2001 debut album Private Radio.

The Grateful Dead commonly performed a song called "He Was a Friend of Mine" during live concerts between 1966 and 1970, but that song was in fact based on the Mark Spoelstra song, "Just a Hand to Hold".

In 2018, Mike Peters and Dave Sharp of the Alarm performed a live version of the song that included lyrics referring to the late singer for Big Country, Stuart Adamson.

In 2020, folksinger Max Gomez released a version of "He Was a Friend of Mine" in response to the Black Lives Matter movement, with verses referencing the murder of George Floyd, the assassinations of Martin Luther King Jr. and Abraham Lincoln, and the removal of Confederate statues. French singer Etienne Daho released a version of the song in 2020.

== See also ==
- Cultural depictions of John F. Kennedy, The Byrds version listed
