= Set You Free This Time =

- West German picture sleeve

Single by the Byrds

from the album Turn! Turn! Turn!
- B-side: "It Won't Be Wrong"
- Released: January 10, 1966
- Recorded: September 16, 1965
- Studio: Columbia, Hollywood, California
- Genre: Folk rock
- Length: 2:49
- Label: Columbia
- Songwriter(s): Gene Clark
- Producer(s): Terry Melcher

The Byrds singles chronology
"Turn! Turn! Turn!" (1965)	"Set You Free This Time" (1966)	"Eight Miles High" (1966)

"Set You Free This Time" is a song by the American folk rock group the Byrds, written by band member Gene Clark. It was first released in December 1965 on the group's Turn! Turn! Turn! album, and later issued as a single in January 1966.

== Composition ==
According to Clark, "Set You Free This Time" was written in just a few hours during the Byrds' 1965 British tour, after a night spent carousing with Paul McCartney at the Scotch of St James club in London. Clark sings the lead vocal and also plays acoustic guitar and harmonica on the track. The lyrics relate the breakup of a relationship, and Byrds biographer Johnny Rogan has commented that Clark's vocal inflections and densely worded lyrics suggest the influence of Bob Dylan. Critic Matthew Greenwald has remarked that the song also has a vague country rock feel to it, largely due to the song's melody and Clark's harmonica solo. The chord progression and rhythm of the song, however, are atypical of country music.

== Single releases ==
Following its appearance on the Turn! Turn! Turn! album, the song was issued as the A-side of a single on January 10, 1966. However, initial sales were relatively poor, with the single only managing to reach number 79 on the Billboard Hot 100. As a result, Columbia Records in America began promoting the single's B-side "It Won't Be Wrong" instead, which resulted in the single eventually climbing to number 63.

In the UK, after a review in the NME stated that the B-side was better than "Set You Free This Time", CBS Records went a step further and actually re-released the single with "It Won't Be Wrong" as the A-side. This reissuing of essentially the same single twice within two weeks caused confusion among British DJs over which of the two songs they should play and contributed to the single's failure to chart. To accompany its UK release as a single, the BBC commissioned a short promotional film from the Byrds. However, on the day of filming a physical altercation occurred between the band's manager Jim Dickson and rhythm guitarist David Crosby, and although some footage was shot, the clip was never aired.

== Reception ==
Despite its lack of commercial success, the single release of "Set You Free This Time" gained mostly positive reviews in the music press. The first edition of Crawdaddy! magazine described it as, "a lovely, moving song with Dylan-like 20-syllabal lines deckful of well chosen words." Cash Box described it as a "laconic, medium-paced woeser essayed in an emotion-charged style." In the UK, Penny Valentine was complimentary in her review of the song for Disc magazine, commenting "On first play, I didn't like it – but now I do. It's rather unByrd-like and very, very Dylan-like. It's slow and gentle and rather sad about never being a person who had much, and though she laughed at him and has now come for help, he doesn't hold a grudge. Ahh!" The Beatles' drummer, Ringo Starr, reviewing the single for Melody Maker, commented, "I only heard it the other day. They can do no wrong in my book. Great record, man, I love the voices."

== Performances and album releases ==
During February 1966, the Byrds performed "Set You Free This Time" on the U.S. television programs Hollywood A Go-Go, Where The Action Is, The Lloyd Thaxton Show, and Shivaree. However, the song disappeared from the band's live concert repertoire following Clark's departure from the group in March 1966. During his solo career, Clark often returned to the song in live concerts and consequently, it appears on his live albums In Concert and Silverado '75: Live & Unreleased.

The Byrds' recording of "Set You Free This Time" is included on several of the band's compilation albums, including The Original Singles: 1965–1967, Volume 1, The Essential Byrds, There Is a Season, and the expanded and remastered edition of The Byrds' Greatest Hits. It has also been included on the Gene Clark compilations Echoes, American Dreamer 1964–1974, Flying High, and Set You Free: Gene Clark in The Byrds 1964–1973.

== Sources ==
- Einarson, John (2005). Mr. Tambourine Man: The Life and Legacy of the Byrds' Gene Clark. Backbeat Books. ISBN 0-87930-793-5.
- Hjort, Christopher (2008). So You Want To Be A Rock 'n' Roll Star: The Byrds Day-By-Day (1965-1973). Jawbone Press. ISBN 978-1-906002-15-2.
- Larkin, Colin (2011). The Encyclopedia of Popular Music (5th Concise ed.). London: Omnibus Press. ISBN 978-0-85712-595-8.
- Rogan, Johnny (1998). The Byrds: Timeless Flight Revisited (2nd ed.). Rogan House. ISBN 0-9529540-1-X.
- Rogan, Johnny (1996). Turn! Turn! Turn! (Reissue CD liner notes). Gene Clark. Edsel Records. ED CD 198.
- Whitburn, Joel (2008). Top Pop Singles 1955–2006. Record Research. ISBN 978-0-89820-172-7.
