= Johnny Rogan =

British author (1953–2021)

- Born: John Rogan; 14 February 1953; Pimlico, London, England
- Died: 21 January 2021 (aged 67); Pimlico, London, England
- Occupation: Biographer

John Rogan (14 February 1953 – 21 January 2021) was a British author of Irish descent best known for his books about music and popular culture. He wrote influential biographies of the Byrds, Neil Young, the Smiths, Van Morrison and Ray Davies. His writing was characterised by "an almost neurotic attention to detail", epic length (the first volume of Requiem for the Timeless is more than 1,200 pages long), and ambivalent - sometimes positive and sometimes hostile - response from the subjects of his biographies.

== Early life ==
Rogan spent his early childhood in impoverished circumstances in the Pimlico area of London. His parents emigrated to London from County Waterford in Ireland in 1943. His cousin was the actor John Rogan. Rogan's adolescence during the 'Swinging 60s' was vividly captured in the chapter "The Ghost of Electricity" from his book Timeless Flight Revisited. There was no mention at all of his tragic family history which included his father (fatal heart attack, late 50s), brother (drowned), sister (fatal brain haemorrhage) and mother (emaciation), among other fatalities.

Rogan attended St Vincents RC and Pimlico School and spent the entire 1970s as a student, obtaining his first degree in English Language & Literature at the University of Newcastle-upon-Tyne, after which he completed an MA at Acadia University in Canada, specialising in Spenser's The Faerie Queene. This was followed by postgraduate study at Lady Margaret Hall, Oxford.

== Career ==
Rogan's first published work was in music magazines such as ZigZag and Dark Star in the late 1970s, with writings on West Coast American music. His first book Timeless Flight, an acclaimed biography of The Byrds was published when he was still a student at Oxford's Lady Margaret Hall. This work was subsequently rewritten as the 700-page-plus volume Timeless Flight Revisited. The work won considerable acclaim, including biography of the year in Record Collector, in which it was described as "One of the best biographies ever written...Expansive enough to rival War And Peace, Johnny Rogan's definitive Byrds biography comes close to matching the emotional, if not geographical, range of Tolstoy's epic novel. One of the achievements of Timeless Flight Revisited is the way in which it matches its narrative flair with the incisiveness of its critical comment... But it's the narrative drive that makes the book so extraordinary. With its detailed research and fascinating interview material, Timeless Flight Revisited is a compelling portrait of collective turmoil, peopled by characters who win our sympathy at the same time as they earn our disbelief." Similar accolades were forthcoming from Billboard, Time Out and Q Magazine ("This is, at least, the best biography of a group ever written").

Like several of Rogan's other books, the book was revised extensively in every decade since its original appearance. Rogan's view was that writing a biography was a continuing commitment, and he maintained archives of material with which to revise his books over the years. Rogan went on to write more than 20 other books, mainly in the field of music and popular culture. These included epic biographies of Neil Young (Zero To Sixty) and Van Morrison, plus work on John Lennon, The Kinks, Wham!/George Michael (Virgin Yearbook "Book of the Year"), Crosby, Stills, Nash & Young and The Smiths. Neil Young is quoted praising Rogan's work on the back of the biography along with a five-star review from Uncut and several other prominent music publications.

The best-selling Morrissey & Marr: The Severed Alliance attracted considerable attention not least from Morrissey who famously said: "Personally I hope Johnny Rogan ends his days very soon in an M3 pile-up." The comment was made prior to the book's publication and Morrissey claimed he had yet to see a copy of any of its contents. Not long afterwards Morrissey expressed a desire that the author should die in a hotel fire. However, in 1996 Morrissey testified under cross examination that he had not read the book, only "bits of it". He also testified that comparing some items of witness statements in relation to facts contained in the book that the "book is correct"; he and Rogan also spoke about various matters at the High Court during a recess. The Severed Alliance has remained in print without interruption since first publication in 1992 and frequently appears in listings of all-time great music biographies. Rogan continued to write extensively about Morrissey, most recently with 2006's Morrissey: The Albums.

Rogan wrote two major biographies of Van Morrison and the acknowledgement page of VM: No Surrender states: "This book has probably had the longest gestation of any I have written." (20 years). However, this was thought to be likely to be eclipsed by Rogan's continuing work on the careers of the Byrds and Neil Young. Morrison on his part is quoted on the 'Dedication Page', saying: "Rogan's got something to hide. What's he hiding? I'd like to do a book on him." However, this quote actually emanates from an interview in 1984. No Surrender featured in The Sunday Times Top 10 books of the year and also featured for two consecutive years in hardback and paperback in Mojo's music books of the year. Among the many favourable press notices attached to the paperback edition was an extravagant review concluding: "Van Morrison: No Surrender is the best book about popular culture written about any Irishman living or dead, and it's certainly the best social history of Belfast in the mid-60s ever written."

Rogan also wrote lengthy studies of football management and pop management (Starmakers & Svengalis), the latter of which was adapted for a BBC series. He has also contributed to numerous television documentaries, DVDs and anthologies, including Oxford Originals a collection of writings from authors, including Rogan, who studied at Lady Margaret Hall. He also worked as a freelance editor and indexer, for example on Colin Larkin's Encyclopedia of Popular Music, and wrote book reviews. Rogan was known for his eccentricity. While working on The Severed Alliance, he said that he once spent one year in isolation without speaking to another human being.

In December 2011, Byrds: Requiem For The Timeless was published. Time Out's lead review noted: "Building on the brick-like Timeless Flight Revisited, Rogan has now collated everything he knows and everything even the staunchest psych-rock aficionado will ever want to know about the group. Rogan's insight is, as ever, razor-keen, and the book is crammed with hilarious anecdotes and brilliant deconstructions of the music. Requiem For The Timeless may yet prove to be one of the key works of rock journalism – it's certainly set to be the definitive book on the Byrds."

In the summer of 2012, Morrissey & Marr: The Severed Alliance – The 20th Anniversary Edition, an expanded and rewritten version of the original was released. Rogan's 750-page biography Ray Davies: A Complicated Life was published in March 2015, with a revised paperback following one year later. According to the London Times: "Ray Davies is an eccentric, singular artist, but does anyone need to read more than 700 pages on him? Rogan, an obsessive, has form with this kind of thing. This makes for a lot to wade through but Rogan’s strength is in his dispassionate approach. He’s not in awe of Davies, nor does he have an axe to grind. Speaking to former wives and managers, band members, brother Dave and [Ray] Davies himself, he gives as definitive a view of the man as anyone could hope for."

In August 2017, Byrds: Requiem For The Timeless, Volume 2 was issued. Both Mojo and Record Collector awarded the book a maximum five stars, the former concluding: "Rogan's dogged devotion, evocative descriptions and eternal quest for truth behind the myths shines from each of its 1,200 pages to create an essential companion to Volume 1."

== Death ==
Rogan split his time between a flat in Pimlico, where he was raised and which he eventually bought, and a home in Tramore that he shared with his long-term partner, Jackie Taylor.

Rogan died on 21 January 2021 at his Pimlico flat. His body was discovered 17 days later.

== Bibliography ==
- Timeless Flight: The Definitive Biography of The Byrds [1980] (authored as John Rogan)
- Neil Young: The Definitive Story Of His Musical Career [1982]
- Roxy Music: Style With Substance – Roxy's first ten years [1982]
- Van Morrison: A Portrait of the Artist [1984]
- The Kinks: The Sound and The Fury [1984]
- Wham! (Confidential): The Death of a Supergroup [1987]
- Starmakers & Svengalis: The History of British Pop Management [1988]
- The Football Managers [1989]
- Timeless Flight: The Definitive Biography of The Byrds [1990] (revised, expanded 2nd Edition)
- The Guinness Encyclopedia of Popular Music (contributor) [1992]
- Morrissey & Marr: The Severed Alliance [1992/93]
- The Smiths: The Visual Documentary [1994]
- The Complete Guide to the Music of The Smiths & Morrissey/Marr [1995]
- Crosby, Stills, Nash & Young: The Visual Documentary [1995]
- The Complete Guide to the Music of Neil Young [1996]
- The Complete Guide to the Music of John Lennon [1997]
- The Byrds: Timeless Flight Revisited — The Sequel [1997]
- The Complete Guide to the Music of Crosby, Stills, Nash & Young [1998]
- The Complete Guide to the Music of The Kinks [1998]
- Neil Young: Zero to Sixty: A Critical Biography [2000]
- Van Morrison: No Surrender [2006]
- Morrissey: The Albums [2006]
- Lennon: The Albums [2008]
- Byrds: Requiem For The Timeless, Volume 1 [2011]
- Morrissey & Marr: The Severed Alliance, The 20th Anniversary Edition [2012]
- Ray Davies: A Complicated Life [2015]
- Byrds: Requiem For The Timeless, Volume 2 [2017]

=== Anthology contributions ===
- The Bowie Companion
- The Encyclopedia of Popular Music
- The Mojo Collection
- Oxford Originals: An Anthology of Writing from Lady Margaret Hall, 1879–2001
