= CBS Columbia Square =

Historic radio and TV studio in California

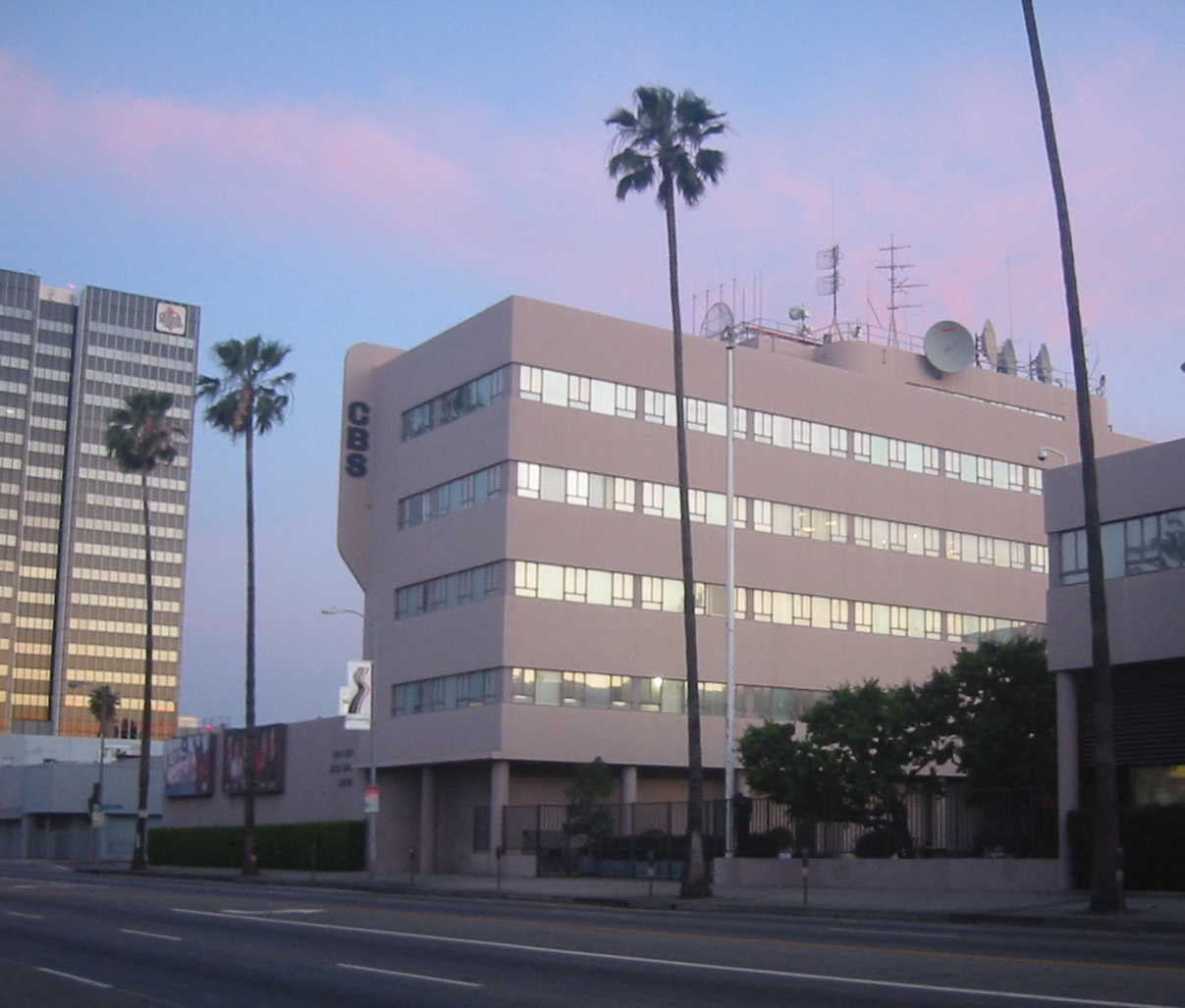
- CBS Columbia Square in April 2007

- Location within the Los Angeles metropolitan area Location within California Location within the United States
- 34.098293°N 118.323087°W
- Location: 6121 Sunset Boulevard; Hollywood, California; 90028

History
- Built: 1938

Site notes
- Architect: William Lescaze
- Architectural style: International Modernism

Los Angeles Historic-Cultural Monument
- Official name: CBS Columbia Square Studios
- Designated: March 10, 2009
- Reference no.: 947

CBS Columbia Square (also called Columbia Studio) was the home of CBS's Los Angeles radio and television operations from 1938 until 2007. Located at 6121 Sunset Boulevard in the Hollywood neighborhood of Los Angeles, California, United States, the building housed the CBS Radio Network's West Coast facilities, as well as CBS's original Los Angeles radio stations, KNX and KCBS-FM. KNXT-TV, Channel 2 (now KCBS-TV) moved into the complex in 1960, and the CBS's West Coast network operations were based there until it moved to the larger CBS Television City in November 1952. After its purchase by CBS in 2002, KCAL-TV moved to the Square from studios adjacent to CBS's corporate sibling Paramount Pictures. Between 2004 and 2007 all of these operations moved to other facilities in the Los Angeles area.

== Architecture and dedication ==
Columbia Square was built for KNX and as the Columbia Broadcasting System's West Coast operations headquarters on the site of the Nestor Film Company, Hollywood's first movie studio. The Christie Film Company eventually took over operation of Nestor Studios and filmed comedies on the site, originally the location of an early Hollywood roadhouse. Prior to moving to Columbia Square, KNX had been situated at several Hollywood locations.

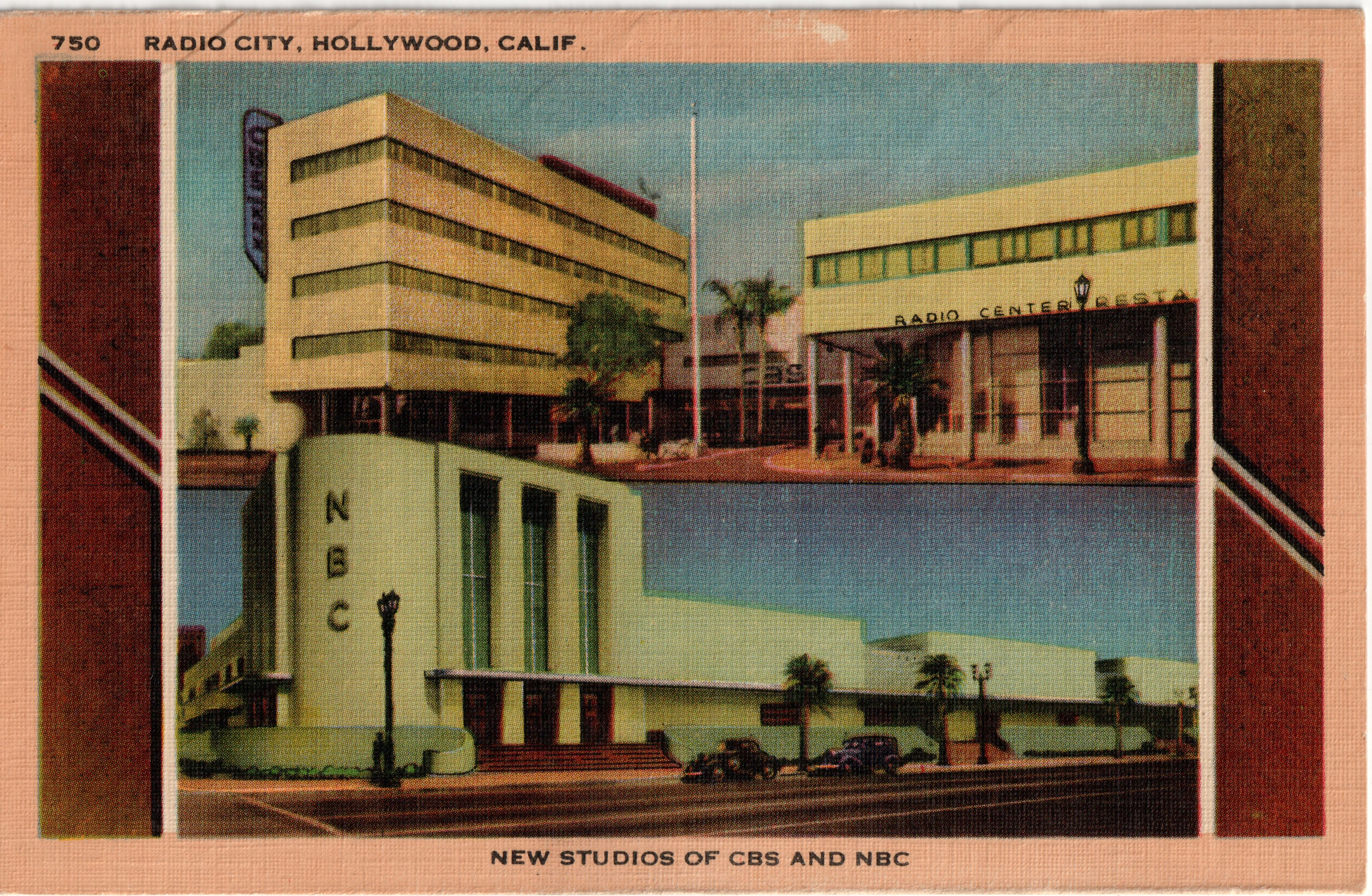
New Los Angeles radio studios of CBS and NBC circa 1938

Columbia Square was designed by Swiss-born architect William Lescaze in the style of International Modernism and built over a year at a cost of two million dollars — more money than had ever been spent on a broadcasting facility.

Lescaze's sweeping streamline motifs, porthole windows and glass brick were true to Modernist design, though CBS President William S. Paley insisted the Square's form follow function. In his dedicatory speech, he remarked, "It is because we believe these new Hollywood headquarters, reflecting many innovations of design and acoustics and control, will improve the art of broadcasting that we have built them and are dedicating them here tonight."

Columbia Square opened April 30, 1938, with a full day of special broadcasts culminating in the star-studded evening special, "A Salute to Columbia Square" featuring Bob Hope, Al Jolson and Cecil B. DeMille. Crowds thronged Sunset Boulevard and a blimp bathed in searchlights hovered overhead as the program was carried coast-to-coast on the Columbia Broadcasting System, beamed to Europe via short wave, and carried across Canada on the CBC. On that premiere broadcast, Hope joked that Columbia Square looked like "the Taj Mahal with a permanent wave." Jolson quipped, "It looks like Flash Gordon's bathroom."

The Square's original configuration included eight studios. Studios 1 through 4 were to the left of the main entrance. Upstairs were Studios 5 through 7 and at the rear of the forecourt was the large auditorium referred to as the "Columbia Playhouse" that seated 1050. In 1940, two new audience theatres were added to the east of the auditorium called "Studio B" and "Studio C" each seating approximately 350 people. Shows such as Jack Benny's Lucky Strike Program and The Adventures of Ozzie and Harriet originated from Studio B. Lucille Ball's My Favorite Husband, Blondie, and Dr. Christian are a few of the shows that broadcast from Studio C. When B and C were built, the Columbia Playhouse then took the letter designation of "Studio A". Studio A was home to The Silver Theatre, The Swan Show starring George Burns and Gracie Allen, The Lady Esther Screen Guild Players and countless others. The complex included Brittingham's Radio Center Restaurant, a men's clothing store, and a branch of the Bank of America. Tours of the studios cost 40 cents and passed by a glass-windowed control room housing Columbia's West Coast master control.

"Columbia Square was one of the glories of radio. It was somewhat sacred to those in the industry. There was nothing comparable to its splendor in New York" says writer-producer Norman Corwin whose most famous broadcast, On a Note of Triumph, originated from the Square on VE Day, 1945.

In early 2009, the Los Angeles Cultural Heritage Commission and the City Council designated CBS Columbia Square Studios as a historic-cultural monument.

== Programs ==
Columbia Square became home to some of the comedies of radio's golden age. Jack Benny, Burns and Allen, Edgar Bergen, Red Skelton, Eve Arden (Our Miss Brooks), Jack Oakie and Steve Allen were broadcast from the Square.

Dramas included Suspense; Gunsmoke; and Man Behind the Gun, written, directed and produced by William N. Robson; Dr. Christian, "The Whistler", Yours Truly, Johnny Dollar, The CBS Radio Workshop, where author Aldous Huxley introduced a production of Brave New World and Columbia Presents Corwin — dramas produced by Norman Corwin. In May 1945 Corwin's "On A Note Of Triumph" was produced in studio A marking the end of the war in Europe and to mark the end of the second world war Corwin produced "14 August" in Studio A.

Musical acts that performed at Columbia Square included Eddie Cantor, Rosemary Clooney, Bing Crosby, Doris Day and Gene Autry. Composer Bernard Hermann frequently scored and conducted Columbia Square broadcasts. Through the facilities of KNX, the Columbia network broadcast big band music from nearby ballrooms including the Hollywood Palladium and the Earl Caroll Theater.

When The Bing Crosby Show moved to CBS in 1949 it took over space on the second floor of the east side of Columbia Square. A tape recording and editing facility also was built there to support the show. It was the first facility of its kind to support a national radio show. The recording sessions and the audience shows were usually held in the CBS theater at 1615 Vine Street just south of Hollywood Boulevard. With the new three recorder facility, the radio show evolved from a cut and splice operation into one that was created from many different recording sessions with audience reactions incorporated. It was new territory explored by the Crosby team.

In the late 1940s and early 1950s Columbia Square also served as a CBS television facility. In 1948, the first West Coast-based variety program, The Ed Wynn Show, was produced on Stage A. Lucille Ball's first national TV appearance took place on The Ed Wynn Show in December 1949 (aired on the East Coast just after New Year). Within the year Stage A would be the location of the shooting of the pilot episode of I Love Lucy.

In the 2005 KNX broadcast, A Salute to Columbia Square, announcer George Walsh recalled crowds jamming the Square's forecourt for tickets to live broadcasts. (Ushers would sometimes walk down Sunset Boulevard to NBC's studios at Vine Street to urge audience members to watch a Columbia Square broadcast instead.) After their on-air appearances, actors would dash to the Radio Actors Telephone Exchange in the Square's lobby to check with their agents about their next bookings.

In 2007, KCRW and other public radio stations broadcast "Remembering Columbia Square: A Salute to a Palace of Broadcasting" featuring Norman Corwin, George Burns, Jack Benny, Jim Hawthorne, Janet Waldo, Art Gilmore, Alan Young, Herb Ellis, Art Linkletter, Gil Stratton, Harry Shearer, Marie Wilson, Mel Baldwin and sound effects man Ray Erlenborn. The program was produced by Gerald Zelinger.

Bob Crane was a top-rated KNX disc jockey at Columbia Square in the 1960s and James Dean worked as an usher. Some of the Square's radio theaters were converted to recording studios for Columbia Records used by Bob Dylan and Barbra Streisand.

== Adaptive reuse ==
KNX moved into new studios in the Miracle Mile neighborhood on L.A.'s Wilshire Boulevard which it shares with Audacy Radio stations KFWB, KTWV, and KRTH. KNX, the last radio station to operate in Hollywood, moved after 67 years of operation at the Square just after 11:00 p.m. August 12, 2005, following a farewell broadcast from its Columbia Square studios. On April 21, 2007, KCBS-TV and KCAL-TV left the building and moved their operations to the CBS Studio Center in Studio City, thus ending Columbia Square's status as a broadcast facility, one of a very few remaining in Hollywood.

The Square fell into disrepair during the years in which Laurence Tisch chaired CBS, and asbestos problems were cited as a reason to demolish the venue. Sungow Corp acquired Columbia Square in 2003 for $15 million. Las Vegas-based developer Molasky Pacific LLC, acquired the property in August 2006 for $66 million. It planned to redevelop the 125,000-square-foot (11,600 m^{2}) complex to continue to attract entertainment industry tenants and is considering options that would add some residential units to the office and broadcasting facility. The project is valued at $850-million and is the largest development project in Hollywood, California. The redevelopment of the historic CBS Studios on Sunset was approved in 2009 with a controversial 28-story tower. Developer Kilroy Realty Group acquired the project in 2012 and changed plans — when completed the new Columbia Square will feature a 20-story residential tower with 200 apartments, 33,000 sq ft (3,100 m^{2}) of retail, three renovated historic structures, two new office buildings with an additional 330,000 sq ft (31,000 m^{2}) of space, and four and a half levels of underground parking. The development was under construction by 2014.

In fall 2007, producer Viacom, owner of CBS until 2005, chose the site for MTV's The Real World: Hollywood.

The National Trust for Historic Preservation and Los Angeles Conservancy have been actively engaged in efforts to preserve the Hollywood landmark.

In November 2014, Kilroy Realty Group announced that Viacom would be leasing most of the space in one of the new office buildings on the site, for the West Coast offices of its cable television networks, including MTV, Comedy Central, BET, TV Land and Spike TV; these offices had been in Santa Monica and other parts of the Los Angeles area. (Spike TV rebranded as Paramount Network in 2018; Viacom and CBS re-merged in 2019 to form ViacomCBS, later Paramount Global.)
