= Nashville West =

American country music band

- Origin: California, United States
- Genres: Country, country rock, folk rock, Bakersfield sound
- Years active: 1967–69
- Past members: Gene Parsons; Gib Guilbeau; Clarence White; Wayne Moore

Nashville West was a short-lived American country rock quartet, that was briefly together in the late 1960s. The group comprised multi-instrumentalist Gene Parsons, guitarist Clarence White, singer-guitarist-fiddler Gib Guilbeau and bassist Wayne Moore. Parsons and White left the band to join The Byrds while Guilbeau and Parsons later joined the Flying Burrito Brothers.

Along with the International Submarine Band, The Byrds and The Flying Burrito Brothers, Nashville West was among the pioneering groups of the country rock genre.

An album by Nashville West was released in 1978, about ten years after the band had broken up. The material on the Nashville West album was recorded during a club date in 1968. The album was released again 2003 on Rev-ola, a division of Cherry Red Records.

== History ==
=== Formation ===
In the mid-1960s, Gene Parsons and fiddler Gib Guilbeau, who had been earlier acquainted from their time together in a band called the Castaways, were hired for a recording session with the Gosdin Brothers' singing duo of Vern and Rex Gosdin. The session, being produced by The Byrds' Chris Hillman, included guitarist Clarence White, who had formerly played bluegrass guitar in the Kentucky Colonels. Parsons, Guilbeau and White then went on to play on sessions together for several other country music artists and became the house band for Gary S. Paxton's record label, Bakersfield International Productions.

In the course of their session work, Parsons and White devised the B-Bender, or Stringbender, a system installed on White's Fender Telecaster that made the instrument sound like a pedal steel guitar.

Eventually, Parsons, Guilbeau and White became a band, joining with fellow session player, bassist-vocalist Wayne Moore, who played in the Castaways with Parsons and Guilbeau.

The group was known by various names, including The Reasons, Gib Guilbeau and The Reasons, the Gary Paxton Band or Cajun Gib and Gene. The Nashville West moniker was taken from the name of the El Monte, California club where they sat as the house band, and was the name of an instrumental song composed by Parsons and White.

=== Break up ===
Parsons and White were then asked to join The Byrds in 1969. White had already played on 1968's The Notorious Byrd Brothers and Sweetheart of the Rodeo. After both Gram Parsons (no relation to Gene) and Chris Hillman left the Byrds to form the Flying Burrito Brothers, White and Gene Parsons joined Roger McGuinn and John York to become full-fledged members of The Byrds. The resulting next album, Dr. Byrds & Mr. Hyde, featured White's and Parsons' signature instrumental tune, "Nashville West". White and Parsons were with the Byrds for the albums Live at the Fillmore - February 1969, Ballad of Easy Rider, (Untitled), Byrdmaniax and Farther Along.

When the original line-up of The Byrds reunited in March 1973 to record Byrds, White left the Byrds to join the bluegrass supergroup Muleskinner. He also played on a package tour with several other country rock pioneers at the time, including Gram Parsons. White then reformed his old band, the Kentucky Colonels, with his brothers, but was killed on July 15, 1973 in Palmdale, California, when he was struck by a car driven by a drunken driver.

Guilbeau went on to play sessions with Linda Ronstadt and joined a band called Swampwater. He also played with Sneaky Pete Kleinow in a group called Cold Steel. In 1974, Guilbeau and Gene Parsons joined the Flying Burrito Brothers.

== Album ==
Nashville West

Live album by Nashville West
- Released: 1978; 1997 (CD reissue); 2003
- Recorded: 1967; El Monte, California
- Genres: Country rock, Bakersfield sound
- Length: 55:38
- Label: Sierra
- Producer: Gary S. Paxton

Professional ratings
Review scores
Source	Rating
Allmusic	link

As a session band, Nashville West recorded prolifically, though never under the Nashville West name, backing other artists on Gary S. Paxton's record label. However, in 1978, an album under the name Nashville West was eventually released on the Sierra Records label. The material on it came from a 1967 club date in El Monte, California, which had been recorded by Parsons for personal use, and not necessarily for album release.

The songs include an instrumental reading of Bobbie Gentry's "Ode to Billie Joe".

"I had a Sony two-track, and I hooked it up, partly to the sound system and partly to the microphones, and just let it run and recorded the whole night," Parsons said. "There's a lot that never got on the album, thank goodness."

The album was reissued on CD by Sierra in 1997, and added four more tracks not included on the LP edition: "C.C. Rider", "Greensleeves", "Mom and Dad's Waltz" and "Columbus Stockade Blues".

=== Track listing ===
1. "Nashville West" (Gene Parsons, Clarence White) – 0:41
2. "Mental Revenge" (Mel Tillis) – 3:37
3. "I Wanna Live" (John D. Loudermilk) – 3:14
4. "C.C. Rider" (traditional) – 3:56
5. "Sweet Susannah" (Gib Guilbeau) – 2:35
6. "Green Green Grass of Home" (Curly Putman) – 4:30
7. "Love of the Common People" (John Hurley, Ronnie Wilkins) – 3:09
8. "Tuff and String" (Gary S. Paxton) – 0:31
9. "I Washed My Hands In Muddy Water" (Joe Babcock) – 2:23
10. "Greensleeves" (traditional) – 3:23
11. "Ode to Billie Joe (Bobbie Gentry) – 3:43
12. "Mom and Dad's Waltz" (Lefty Frizzell) – 3:22
13. "Louisiana Rains" (Guilbeau) – 2:34
14. "Sing Me Back Home" (Merle Haggard) – 3:14
15. "Columbus Stockade Blues" (traditional) – 4:13
16. "Memphis" (Chuck Berry) – 3:27
17. "By the Time I Get to Phoenix" (Jimmy Webb) – 5:04
18. "Nashville West" (Parsons/White) – 2:03
