= Dr. Byrds & Mr. Hyde =

Studio album by the Byrds
- Released: March 5, 1969
- Recorded: October 7 – October 16, December 4, 1968; October 21, 1968
- Studios: Columbia, Hollywood; Columbia, Nashville
- Genres: Rock; country rock; folk rock; psychedelic rock
- Length: 34:25
- Label: Columbia
- Producer: Bob Johnston

The Byrds chronology
Sweetheart of the Rodeo (1968)	Dr. Byrds & Mr. Hyde (1969)	Preflyte (1969)

Singles from Dr. Byrds & Mr. Hyde
- 1. "Bad Night at the Whiskey" Released: January 7, 1969

Dr. Byrds & Mr. Hyde is the seventh studio album by the American rock band the Byrds, released on March 5 1969, by Columbia Records. The album was produced by Bob Johnston and saw the band juxtaposing country rock material with psychedelic rock, giving the album a stylistic split-personality that was alluded to in its title. It was the first album to feature the new band line-up of Clarence White (guitar), Gene Parsons (drums), John York (bass), and founding member Roger McGuinn (guitar). Dr. Byrds & Mr. Hyde is unique within the band's discography for being the only album on which McGuinn sings the lead vocal on every track.

The album peaked at number 153 on the Billboard Top LPs album chart and reached number 15 on the UK Albums Chart. A preceding single, "Bad Night at the Whiskey" (b/w "Drug Store Truck Drivin' Man"), was released on January 7, 1969, but it failed to chart in the United States or in the United Kingdom. In addition, a non-album single featuring a cover of Bob Dylan's "Lay Lady Lay", which was recorded shortly after the release of Dr. Byrds & Mr. Hyde and also produced by Johnston, peaked at number 132 on the Billboard chart. Dr. Byrds & Mr. Hyde is the lowest charting album of the band's career in the United States, edging out the later Farther Along by one place.

== Background ==
Following the departure of Gram Parsons from the band, lead guitarist Roger McGuinn and bass player Chris Hillman decided that they needed to find a replacement member to meet their forthcoming concert obligations. With an appearance at the Newport Pop Festival looming, McGuinn and Hillman moved quickly to recruit noted session guitarist and longtime Byrd-in-waiting, Clarence White. White, who had played as a session musician on the Byrds' previous three albums, was invited to join the band as a full-time member in July 1968. After the Newport Pop Festival appearance, White began to express dissatisfaction with the band's drummer, Kevin Kelley, and soon persuaded McGuinn and Hillman to replace Kelley with Gene Parsons (no relation to Gram), a friend of White's from their days together in the band Nashville West.

The new McGuinn, Hillman, White and Parsons line-up of the band was together for less than a month before Hillman departed to form the Flying Burrito Brothers with Gram Parsons. John York, a session musician who had toured with Johnny Rivers, the Sir Douglas Quintet, and the Mamas & the Papas, was hired as his replacement on bass. The new band line-up, featuring McGuinn and White's dual guitar work, was regarded by critics and audiences as much more accomplished in concert than any previous configuration of the Byrds had been.

Amidst so many changes in band personnel, McGuinn decided that he alone would sing lead vocals on the band's new album, to give it a sense of sonic unity. McGuinn felt that it would be too confusing for fans of the Byrds to have the unfamiliar voices of the new members coming forward at this stage and so White, Parsons and York were relegated to backing vocal duties during the recording of the album. As a result, Dr. Byrds & Mr. Hyde is the only album in the Byrds' catalogue to feature McGuinn singing lead on every track.

Prior to the recording of the album, the Byrds' record producer, Gary Usher, who had worked on the band's three previous albums, had been fired by Columbia Records for spending too much money on the recording of the Chad & Jeremy album Of Cabbages and Kings. Faced with the need to find a replacement producer, the band elected to bring in Bob Johnston, who had been Bob Dylan's producer since 1965. Ultimately, the band were unhappy with Johnston's work on Dr. Byrds & Mr. Hyde and, as a result, it was the only Byrds' album to be produced by him. Johnston was employed once more as the band's producer on their May 1969 non-album single, "Lay Lady Lady". In that instance he incurred the band's wrath by overdubbing a female choir on to the recording, allegedly without the Byrds' consent. When the single then stalled at number 132 on the Billboard charts the band decided that they would not work with Johnston again.

== Recording ==
Recording sessions for the album began on October 7, 1968, with nine songs intended for the album being recorded during that month. Among these songs were "Nashville West", an instrumental written by Parsons and White during their tenure with the country rock group of the same name, and "Your Gentle Way of Loving Me", a song that Parsons and Gib Guilbeau had released as a single in 1967.

Another song recorded during these sessions was McGuinn's "King Apathy III", a comment on political apathy and a championing of the rural idyll as an antidote to the excesses of the L.A. rock scene. The October recording sessions also saw the band attempting the traditional song "Old Blue", which McGuinn had originally learned from watching Bob Gibson and Bob Camp at Chicago's Gate of Horn club back in April 1961. "Old Blue" is the first of three dog-related songs to be recorded by the Byrds: the second and third being "Fido" from the Ballad of Easy Rider and "Bugler" from Farther Along. "Old Blue" features the first appearance on a Byrds' recording of the Parsons and White designed StringBender, an invention that allowed White to duplicate the sound of a pedal steel guitar on his Fender Telecaster.

The October recording sessions also yielded "Bad Night at the Whiskey", a song that would go on to be issued as the A-side of a single two months before the album. Named after a disappointing gig at the Whisky a Go Go and co-written by Joey Richards, a friend of McGuinn's, "Bad Night at the Whiskey" featured allusive lyrics that bore little or no relationship to the song's title.

The Byrds also recorded a version of Dylan and Rick Danko's "This Wheel's on Fire" during the October 1968 sessions, but this version of the song was not included on the album. "Stanley's Song", written by McGuinn and his friend Robert J. Hippard also dates from these sessions, but it was eventually discarded and did not appear in the final track listing for Dr. Byrds & Mr. Hyde.

Another composition recorded during the October 1968 sessions was the McGuinn and Gram Parsons penned "Drug Store Truck Drivin' Man". The song had been written by the pair in London in May 1968, before Parsons' departure from the band, and was inspired by the hostility shown towards the Byrds by legendary Nashville DJ Ralph Emery when they appeared on his WSM radio program. The song's barbed lyric contains a volley of Redneck stereotypes, set to a classic country 3/4 time signature and begins with the couplet, "He's a drug store truck drivin' man/He's the head of the Ku Klux Klan." Emery was not, in fact, a Klansman. The song was subsequently performed by Joan Baez at the Woodstock Festival in 1969 and dedicated to the then-governor of California, Ronald Reagan. Baez's performance of the song also appeared on the Woodstock: Music from the Original Soundtrack and More album.

An acetate version of Dr. Byrds & Mr. Hyde, dated October 16, 1968, and containing a seven-track programme for the album is known to exist. At this point the album consisted of the songs "Old Blue", "King Apathy III", "Drug Store Truck Drivin' Man" and "This Wheel's on Fire" on side one, with "Your Gentle Way of Loving Me", "Nashville West" and "Bad Night at the Whiskey" on side two.

The Byrds returned to the studio on December 4, 1968, to re-record "This Wheel's on Fire". The Byrds also revisited two songs that had been written for the 1968 film Candy. Of these two songs, "Child of the Universe", written by McGuinn and soundtrack composer Dave Grusin, was used in the film, while the McGuinn—York penned title track was not. A medley featuring the Dylan-authored Byrds' hit "My Back Pages", along with an instrumental named "B.J. Blues" and a jam version of the blues standard "Baby What You Want Me to Do" was also recorded during this December recording session.

== Release ==
Dr. Byrds & Mr. Hyde was released on March 5, 1969, in the United States (catalogue item CS 9755) and April 25, 1969, in the United Kingdom (catalogue item 63545 in mono, S 63545 in stereo). Like the Byrds' previous LP, Sweetheart of the Rodeo, the album was issued exclusively in stereo in America, but appeared in both mono and stereo variations in the UK. Sales of Dr. Byrds & Mr. Hyde were poor in the U.S., causing it to stall at number 153 on the Billboard Top LPs chart and giving the album the dubious honor of being the lowest charting album of the band's career, edging out the later Farther Along by just one place. The album fared better in the United Kingdom, however, where it reached number 15 on the UK Albums Chart. The "Bad Night at the Whiskey" single was released ahead of the album on January 7, 1969, but it failed to reach the Billboard Hot 100 or the UK Singles Chart.

The album's title, along with the back cover photo sequence, which featured the band changing from astronaut flight suits into cowboy garb, illustrated the schizoid nature of the album's material. The psychedelic rock of "Bad Night at the Whiskey" and "This Wheel's on Fire" sat alongside the Bakersfield-style country rock of "Nashville West" and "Drug Store Truck Drivin' Man". Despite containing only ten tracks, Dr. Byrds & Mr. Hyde is the Byrds' longest single album, clocking in at approximately thirty-five minutes in length. Only the double album (Untitled) is longer.

== Critical reception and legacy ==
Professional ratings
Review scores
Source	Rating
AllMusic	2.5/5 stars
Encyclopedia of Popular Music	3/5 stars
The Great Rock Discography	5/10
Record Mirror	4/5 stars
The Rolling Stone Album Guide	3/5 stars

The album was released to generally positive reviews, with famed rock critic Robert Christgau declaring the album "first-rate Byrds, a high recommendation." Johanna Schrier, writing in The Village Voice, described the album as "smooth and strong like a blended whiskey", before suggesting that it was "Part kin to Sweetheart of the Rodeo, part the acid offspring of Notorious Byrd Brothers." In the UK, Record Mirror awarded the album four stars out of five, commenting "British devotees will dig this more than Sweetheart." Disc magazine were particularly enthusiastic in their praise of the album, stating "[This is] their best album since perhaps Younger Than Yesterday, perfectly illustrating the two completely disparate sides of the group: far-out electronic rock and hick, twangy country."

In more recent times, critic Mark Deming has stated in his review for the AllMusic website that the album "proved there was still life left in the Byrds, but also suggested that they hadn't gotten back to full speed yet." Senior editor of Rolling Stone, David Fricke, has described the album as "the Great Forgotten Byrds album", while also noting that it "seemed tame in its reliance on the familiar." Andy Gill of Mojo was less generous, describing it as "a patchy album whose title all too aptly suggested the confusion about the group's direction, an uneasy mix of heavyish rock and country stylings." However, he praised White as a great addition to the band, particularly for the "extraordinary sounds" he created on the StringBender.

Dr. Byrds & Mr. Hyde was remastered at 20-bit resolution as part of the Columbia/Legacy Byrds series. It was reissued in an expanded form on March 25, 1997, with five bonus tracks, including the outtake "Stanley's Song". Also included among the bonus tracks were alternate versions of "This Wheel's on Fire" and "Nashville West", as well as the band's cover of "Lay Lady Lay", which was issued as a single two months after the release of the album. However, in the version included here, "Lay Lady Lay" is lacking the female backing chorus that had originally appeared on the single release.

There has been some discussion amongst fans of the Byrds as to whether or not Dr. Byrds & Mr. Hyde was remixed for its expanded reissue in 1997. Although the producer of the Columbia/Legacy Byrds' series, Bob Irwin, has stated that only the first four Byrds' albums underwent any remixing, some fans of the band maintain that Dr. Byrds & Mr. Hyde was also remixed, citing distinct differences between the 1997 reissue and the original album. Among the differences found on the reissue are a lessening of reverb on many songs, the appearance of the spoken word "three" over the opening seconds of "This Wheel's on Fire", and a longer, unedited version of "Candy" appearing on the album for the first time.

== Track listing ==
Side one
No.	Title	Writer(s)	Length
1.	"This Wheel's on Fire"	Bob Dylan, Rick Danko	4:44
2.	"Old Blue"	traditional, arranged Roger McGuinn	3:21
3.	"Your Gentle Way of Loving Me"	Gib Guilbeau, Gary Paxton	2:35
4.	"Child of the Universe"	Dave Grusin, Roger McGuinn	3:15
5.	"Nashville West"	Gene Parsons, Clarence White	2:29

Side two
No.	Title	Writer(s)	Length
1.	"Drug Store Truck Drivin' Man"	Roger McGuinn, Gram Parsons	3:53
2.	"King Apathy III"	Roger McGuinn	3:00
3.	"Candy"	Roger McGuinn, John York	3:01
4.	"Bad Night at the Whiskey"	Roger McGuinn, Joseph Richards	3:23
5.	"Medley: My Back Pages/B.J. Blues/Baby What You Want Me to Do"	Bob Dylan, Roger McGuinn, John York, Gene Parsons, Clarence White, Jimmy Reed	4:08

1997 CD reissue bonus tracks
No.	Title	Writer(s)	Length
11.	"Stanley’s Song"	Roger McGuinn, Robert J. Hippard	3:12
12.	"Lay Lady Lay" (Alternate Version)	Bob Dylan	3:18
13.	"This Wheel's on Fire" (alternate - version one)	Bob Dylan, Rick Danko	3:53
14.	"Medley: My Back Pages/B.J. Blues/Baby What You Want Me To Do" (alternate - version one)	Bob Dylan, Roger McGuinn, John York, Gene Parsons, Clarence White, Jimmy Reed	4:18
15.	"Nashville West" (alternate version — Nashville Recording)	Gene Parsons, Clarence White	2:04

== Personnel ==
Adapted from The Byrds: Timeless Flight Revisited and So You Want To Be A Rock 'n' Roll Star: The Byrds Day-By-Day (1965-1973).

The Byrds

- Roger McGuinn – guitar, lead vocals
- Clarence White – guitar, backing vocals
- John York – electric bass, backing vocals
- Gene Parsons – drums, harmonica, banjo, backing vocals

Additional personnel

- Lloyd Green – pedal steel guitar on "Drug Store Truck Drivin' Man"

== Release history ==
Date	Label	Format	Country	Catalog	Notes
March 5, 1969	Columbia	LP	US	CS 9755	Original stereo release.
April 25, 1969	CBS	LP	UK	63545	Original mono release.
April 25, 1969	CBS	LP	UK	S 63545	Original stereo release.
1991	Columbia	CD	US	CK 9755	Original CD release.
1993	BGO	LP	UK	BGOLP 107	
1993	BGO	CD	UK	BGOCD 107	
March 25, 1997	Columbia/Legacy	CD	US	CK 65113	Reissue containing five bonus tracks and the remastered stereo album.
March 25, 1997	Columbia/Legacy	CD	UK	COL 486753	Reissue containing five bonus tracks and the remastered stereo album.
1999	Simply Vinyl	LP	UK	SVLP 070	Reissue of the remastered stereo album.
2003	Sony	CD	Japan	MHCP-101	Reissue containing five bonus tracks and the remastered album in a replica LP sleeve.
2008	Sundazed	LP	US	LP 5072	

=== Single release ===
1. "Bad Night at the Whiskey" b/w "Drug Store Truck Drivin' Man" (Columbia 44746) January 7, 1969

== Bibliography ==
- Rogan, Johnny, The Byrds: Timeless Flight Revisited, Rogan House, 1998, ISBN 0-9529540-1-X
- Hjort, Christopher, So You Want To Be A Rock 'n' Roll Star: The Byrds Day-By-Day (1965-1973), Jawbone Press, 2008, ISBN 1-906002-15-0.
