= Live at the Fillmore – February 1969 =

Live at the Fillmore — February 1969

Live album by the Byrds
- Released: February 22, 2000
- Recorded: February 7–8, 1969
- Venues: Fillmore West auditorium, Fillmore Street, San Francisco, CA
- Genre: Rock
- Length: 51:35
- Label: Columbia/Legacy
- Producers: Bob Irwin and Roger McGuinn

The Byrds chronology
Byrd Parts (1998)	Live at the Fillmore — February 1969 (2000)	Sanctuary (2000)

Professional ratings
Review scores
Source	Rating
Allmusic	3/5 stars

Live at the Fillmore — February 1969 is a live album released by the American rock band the Byrds in 2000 on Columbia/Legacy. Compiled from two performances at the Fillmore West on February 7 and 8, 1969, the album includes several songs that are not found on any of the group's studio albums.

Recorded less than a week after the release of the Byrds' album, Dr. Byrds & Mr. Hyde, the band line-up on these recordings includes lead singer and guitarist Roger McGuinn, lead guitarist Clarence White, bassist John York, and drummer Gene Parsons. The album features White using the Stringbender device on his guitar, which he co-invented with drummer (and banjo player) Gene Parsons. The Stringbender allowed White to emulate the sound of a pedal steel guitar on his Fender Telecaster guitar.

Live At The Fillmore — February 1969 did not chart in either the U.S. or the UK.

== Track listing ==
1. "Nashville West" (Gene Parsons, Clarence White) – 1:57
2. "You're Still on My Mind" (Luke McDaniel) – 1:57
3. "Pretty Boy Floyd" (Woody Guthrie) – 3:13
4. "Drug Store Truck Drivin' Man" (Roger McGuinn, Gram Parsons) – 2:28
5. "Medley: Turn! Turn! Turn! (To Everything There Is a Season)/Mr. Tambourine Man/Eight Miles High" (Book of Ecclesiastes/Pete Seeger, Bob Dylan, Gene Clark, Roger McGuinn, David Crosby) – 9:47
6. "Close up The Honky Tonks" (Red Simpson) – 2:59
7. "Buckaroo" (Bob Morris) – 2:02
8. "The Christian Life" (Ira Louvin, Charlie Louvin) – 2:10
9. "Time Between" (Chris Hillman) – 2:09
10. "King Apathy III" (Roger McGuinn) – 3:14
11. "Bad Night at the Whiskey" (Roger McGuinn, Joseph Richards) – 3:50
12. "This Wheel's on Fire" (Bob Dylan, Rick Danko) – 4:17
13. "Sing Me Back Home" (Merle Haggard) – 3:08
14. "So You Want to Be a Rock 'n' Roll Star" (Roger McGuinn, Chris Hillman) – 2:36
15. "He Was a Friend of Mine" (traditional, new words and arrangement Roger McGuinn) – 2:32
16. "Chimes of Freedom" (Bob Dylan) – 3:23
