= Meridian Green =

Meridian Green is a California-based folk musician, and one half of Parsons Green, a collaboration with multi-instrumentalist Gene Parsons, former drummer with The Byrds.

== History ==
Green was born to folk musician Bob Gibson in Greenwich Village. She moved to California's Mendocino area and began playing with the Gypsy Gulch International String Band. She also began playing bluegrass music with Gene Parsons, and they released some music commercially.

As a solo artist and duetist, her work has been featured on the BBC and New York Times as well as smaller papers such as the Lincoln Chronicle . She has also performed internationally, both by herself and at numerous festivals.

In addition to her musical career, she co-created the Parsons/Green B-Bender device used in the Fender Nashville B-Bender Telecaster guitar.

In 2009, Green began a tour featuring the works of Bob Gibson as one-third of the Fare-Thee-Wells, along with John Heller and Rick Grumbecker. As of February 2009, The Bob Gibson Legacy Tour, which features several acts, was slated for 28 dates.

== Discography ==
Meridian Green has performed in a variety of acts.

=== Solo ===
- In the Heart of This Town (CD)
- "Walking to Washington," a politically oriented single.

=== Parsons Green ===
- Birds of a Feather (CD) - 1986
- Live From Caspar (CD) - 1999

=== Other work ===
- Chuck McCabe - Bad Gravity Day (backup singing)
- Julian Dawson - Hillbilly Zen (backup singing)
- Antonia Lamb - Amazing Tracks (backup singing)
- Dan Paul - World Without Walls (backup singing)
- Holly Tannen - Rime Of The Ancient Matriarch (producer, performer)
