= Fender Nashville B-Bender Telecaster =

Electric guitar

The Fender Nashville B-Bender Telecaster is an American Standard series electric guitar made by Fender Musical Instruments Corporation. This guitar is a Fender Telecaster with the addition of a factory-installed B-string bender device. The device raises the pitch of the second (B) string by one whole step (two frets) to C-sharp. The bend is activated by a one-inch downward pull on the guitar neck, allowing the player to emulate pedal steel sounds and play complex country bends. The Nashville B-Bender Telecaster was introduced in 1996 with major design changes in 1998 and 2000.

== Origin ==
The B-Bender device was invented in 1967 by drummer and machinist Gene Parsons and guitarist Clarence White to fit White's Fender Telecaster. The B-string terminates in a separate hole beyond the normal bridge, this is connected to the upper strap button by a sprung lever behind a large plate on the back of the guitar. Pulling the neck downwards loads the lever and increases the tension on the string.

The original Parsons/White Stringbender was licensed to Leo Fender in 1968, but he never put it into production. Parsons continued to build and install the device himself, and sold several hundred to the Japanese instrument company Tokai Gakki for installation in their guitars. In the late 1980s, Parsons and business partner Meridian Green approached Fender again and met with luthier Fred Stuart at the new California Fender Custom Shop. Stuart and the Custom Shop eventually produced about 200 Clarence White model Telecasters equipped with the Parsons/White Stringbender, plus Scruggs tuners on both E strings. Based on this success, Fender decided to mass-produce a similar model. Parsons and Green redesigned the B-bender device for simpler installation and licensed it to Fender as the Parsons/Green B-Bender. The first Fender Nashville B-Bender Telecaster was manufactured in 1996.

== 1996 American Standard model ==
The first production model was called the American Standard B-Bender Telecaster. This guitar included two American Standard pickups and a 3-way selector switch. The guitar body was solid alder wood with a 1952-style sharp radius, a 1-piece maple neck and maple fretboard with rolled edges, 25.5 inch (648 mm) scale with 22 medium-jumbo frets, die-cast tuners and a 3-ply pickguard. The bridge was an American Telecaster series through-the-body model with 6 individually adjustable stainless steel saddles. The Parsons/Green B-Bender device was factory-installed in the routed-out back of the guitar and covered by a chrome plate. This model was available finished in Candy Apple Red, Black, Vintage White or Brown Sunburst, and was made in the United States.

== 1998 Hot Rodded American model ==
In the fall of 1998, the two-pickup system was replaced by a three-pickup configuration similar to the Stratocaster layout. The neck and bridge pickups were replaced with the hotter Delta Tone pickup system and the new middle pickup was the same "Texas Special" overwound single-coil pickup used in the Stevie Ray Vaughan model Stratocaster. The third pickup required a new selector switch, so a 5-way "Strat-o-Tele" selector with an S-1 switching system was added. All other features remained the same as the 1996 model.

== 2000 American Nashville model ==
Introduced in June 2000, the redesigned American Series model added Schaller staggered tuning machines, a new neck shape with rolled edges and a 4-ply white pearloid pickguard. The body was changed from alder to poplar, and the finishes were limited to Black and 3-color Sunburst. The S switching feature was also removed from this model. Other features remained the same as the 1998 Hot Rodded model. Fender has since stopped making the American Nashville series although a limited number can still be found for purchase.

== Deluxe Nashville ==
The American made B-Bender should not be confused with the Deluxe Nashville, a guitar that Fender builds in its Mexico facility that a similar 3 pickup design to the B-Bender guitar, but has no B-Bender and features Vintage Noiseless pickups, a modern bridge with block saddles, 12"-radius maple neck with 22 medium-jumbo frets and pearloid dot inlays, contoured neck heel and locking tuners with short posts as of 2016.
