= Julian Dawson =

British musician

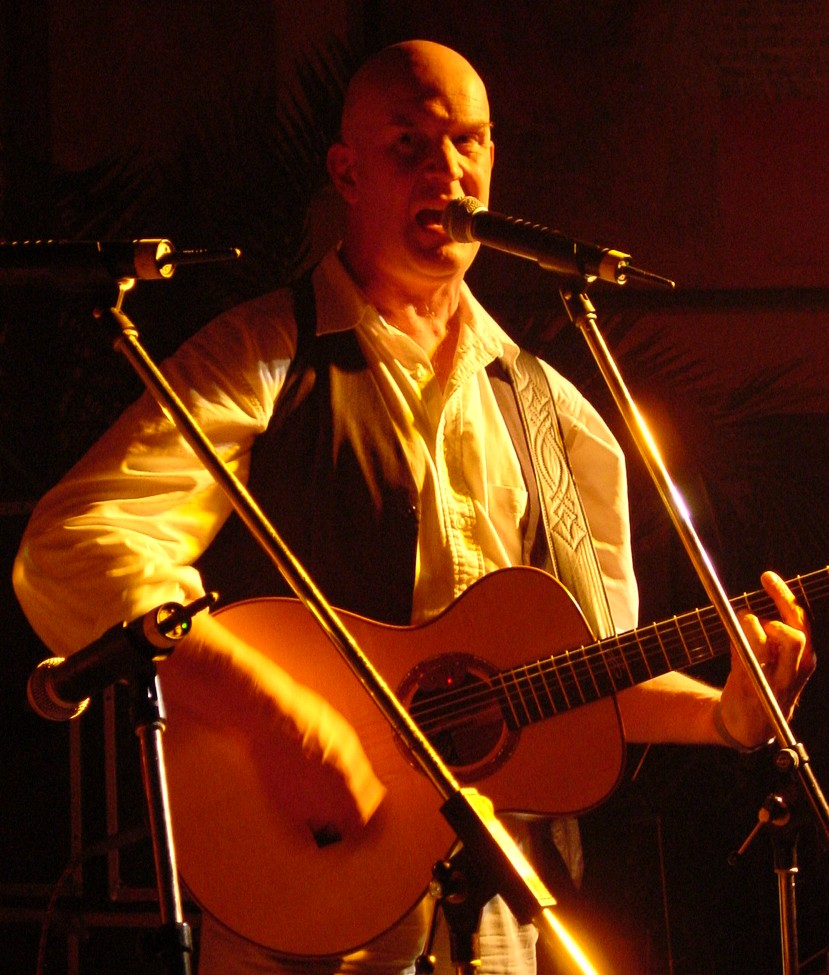
Julian Dawson

Julian Dawson (born 4 July 1954 in London) is a British singer–songwriter, guitarist and author. His style has been compared to Wilco and Ron Sexsmith. He is fluent in German and French. Outside his solo work, acts he has recorded with (as singer or harmonica player) include Gerry Rafferty, Glenn Tilbrook, Del Amitri, Dan Penn, Iain Matthews and his band Plainsong, Richard Thompson and Benny Hill. He also worked with German krautrockers Can, and BAP.

== Biography ==
He attended two Catholic boarding schools for nine years and Exeter College of Art and Design for three years, before deciding to take up music full-time and playing his first professional jobs for the US army in Germany. After a return to London, he learned his craft on the road all over Europe and the UK with various band line-ups, playing his own songs from day one and eventually landing his first record deal.

One pub-rock influenced LP was followed by two albums for Polydor, both recorded at the Can Studio near Cologne with Jaki Liebezeit and guests Richard Thompson and Toots Thielemans. 'As Real As Disneyland' garnered album-of-month status and sold well in the German-speaking territories, setting a pattern of Dawson having more success abroad than at home that has remained a feature of his career so far.

In the early 1990s, Dawson turned his attentions to the US, making two albums in Nashville with E Street Band bass-player Garry Tallent producing and a host of local guests, including Vince Gill, Duane Eddy, Bill Payne and Steve Forbert. Fragile As China charted in Germany and helped him build a radio presence and a solid following in the US, where he still tours at least once a year.

Visits to the States, and Nashville and Austin in particular, became a regular part of his life, leading to further recordings (five in all for BMG) and co-writes and collaborations with artists such as Dan Penn, Willie Nile, Nicky Hopkins, Jules Shear and Lucinda Williams, with whom he also recorded a duet version of "How Can I Sleep Without You".

For several years he kept together a live band, featuring guitarist Steuart Smith (now with the Eagles). More albums followed both as a member of Plainsong with Iain Matthews and solo including Move Over Darling, with Richard Thompson, Dan Penn and the Roches, Under The Sun with Soft Boys Kimberley Rew and Andy Metcalfe and 2002's Hillbilly Zen with ex-Byrd Gene Parsons.

Dawson has performed at festivals such as Newport (US), Cambridge, Cropredy and Glastonbury in England, on tour with Plainsong, Al Stewart, Fairport Convention and others, on TV's Later With Jools Holland (with the Richard Thompson Band) or the Europe-wide Rockpalast with his own.

In 1996, he produced Charlie Louvin's comeback album The Longest Train and later appeared with him at the BBC Proms. Dawson's 2008 CD Deep Rain, produced in Nashville by Dan Penn, helped to introduce him to a wider audience and was followed by a band tour, preserved on the double CD/DVD Live, released in 2010. He has been producing a first solo album for Beverley Martyn.

2010 also saw the first publication of his biography of Nicky Hopkins by Random House, Germany. The English language book followed in spring 2011, via Desert Hearts in the UK (in hardback) and Backstage Books/Plus One Press in North America (in paperback). First reviews were positive (four stars from Uncut magazine).

== Discography ==
- 1982: Let Out The Pig (MMG)
- 1987: As Real As Disneyland (Polydor)
- 1989: Luckiest Man in the Western World (Polydor)
- 1990: Live on the Radio (Nico Polo)
- 1991: Fragile As China (Ariola)
- 1992: June Honeymoon – Live (BMG / Ariola)
- 1993: Headlines (Ariola)
- 1994: How Human Hearts Behave – Collection 1984–1994 (BMG Aris)
- 1995: Travel On (Watermelon / BMG)
- 1996: Steal That Beat -The Lost Tapes (Re-release of "Let Out The Pig") (Hypertension)
- 1996; Songs From The Red Couch – Live (with Iain Matthews)
- 1997: Move Over Darling (Compass)
- 1999: Under The Sun (Blue Rose)
- 2001: Cologne Again Or – Live (with Andy Metcalfe)
- 2002 Flood Damage – Live (with Iain Matthews)
- 2002 Hillbilly Zen (Fledg'ling) (with Gene Parsons)
- 2004 Bedroom Suite (Blue Rose)
- 2006 Nothing Like A Dame
- 2008 Deep Rain (Blue Rose)
- 2010 Live (Double CD & DVD)
- 2013 Life And Soul (Blue Rose)
- 2015 Living Good (Fledg'ling UK)
- 2024 4th of July (Magic Mile Music)
