= John York (musician) =

American bassist and guitarist (born 1946)

- Born: John York Foley; August 3, 1946 (age 79); White Plains, New York, U.S.
- Genres: Rock, country rock
- Occupations: Musician, songwriter, record producer
- Instruments: Bass guitar, guitar, oud, vocals
- Years active: 1965–present
- Labels: Tribe, Columbia, Debris, Taxim
- Formerly of: The Bees, Sir Douglas Quintet, The Byrds
- Website: www.johnyorkmusic.com

John York Foley (born August 3, 1946) is an American bassist and guitarist. He is best known for his work with the Byrds.

== History ==
Prior to joining the Byrds, John York was a member of the Bees and the Sir Douglas Quintet, and also worked as a session musician for the Mamas & the Papas and Johnny Rivers. He was also the bassist in ex-Byrd Gene Clark's touring band.

York joined The Byrds in September 1968, as a replacement for the band's original bass player Chris Hillman. He remained with the group until September 1969, when he was replaced by Skip Battin.

Despite only being with the Byrds for a year, his bass playing and singing appear on two of the group's studio albums, Dr. Byrds & Mr. Hyde and Ballad of Easy Rider, as well as on the non-album single "Lay Lady Lay". He wrote "Fido", which appears on Ballad of Easy Rider, and co-wrote "Candy", which is included on Dr. Byrds & Mr. Hyde. He also appears on the Columbia/Legacy Byrds' live album Live at the Fillmore - February 1969.

Following his departure from the Byrds, York worked with Clark during the mid-1980s, along with Pat Robinson, in the group CRY. He served as an integral member of the Tribute to the Byrds band along with Gene Clark, Michael Clarke, Rick Roberts and others in the mid to late 1980s.

York has maintained a lengthy career as a guitarist and bass player, and since the 1980s has worked with artists including Chris Darrow, Katie Trickett, Steven T., Nick Binkley, and Carla Olson, among others.

In 1988, he recorded a number of songs with fellow ex-Byrds bass player Skip Battin, and these recordings were issued as the Family Tree album in 2001. He released three solo albums, Sacred Path Songs (1991), Claremont Dragon (1998), and Arigatou Baby (2006), and recorded the albums Clan Mother Songs with Jamie Sams, and Koto with Yukiko Matsuyama. In 2008, York teamed-up with singer-songwriter Barry McGuire for a live tour entitled Trippin' the 60's, replacing ex Mason Proffit member Terry Talbot as McGuires touring partner.

== Selected discography ==
=== The Bees ===
- "Leave Me Be"/"She's an Artist" (7" single – 1965)
- "Forget Me Girl"/"Baby, Let Me Follow You Down" (7" single – 1966)

=== Sir Douglas Quintet ===
- "She Digs My Love"/"When I Sing the Blues" (7" single – 1966)

=== The Byrds ===
- Dr. Byrds & Mr. Hyde (1969)
- "Lay Lady Lay"/"Old Blue" (7" single – 1969)
- Ballad of Easy Rider (1969)
- Live at the Fillmore – February 1969 (2000)

=== The Museuns ===
- "Train in the Desert"/"Sweet Names of Spanish Ladies" (7" single – circa 1974–1976)

=== John York ===
- Sacred Path Songs (1991)
- Clan Mother Songs [with Jamie Sams] (1992)
- Claremont Dragon (1998)
- Koto [with Yukiko Matsuyama] (2003)
- Arigatou Baby (2006)
- West Coast Revelation [with Kim Fowley] (2007)
- Trippin' the 60's: The Show Songs Live [with Barry McGuire] (2009)
- West Coast Revelation [with Kim Fowley] (GRA Records; 2011)

=== CRY ===
- After the Storm (2000)

=== Family Tree ===
- Family Tree [with Skip Battin, Ricky Mantoan, Beppe D'Angelo] (2001)

=== Selected album guest appearances ===
- The Mamas & the Papas – The Papas & The Mamas (1968)
- Jack Street Band – Jack Street Band (1982)
- Katie Trickett – The Next Time (1994)
- Mojave – Tumbleweed Circuit (1995)
- Peter Lewis – Peter Lewis (1995)
- Nick Binkley – Pin Stripe Brain (1996)
- Chris Darrow – Coyote + Straight from the Heart (1997)
- Chris Darrow and Max Buda – Harem Girl (1998)
- Anita Kruse – Creation Flight (1998)
- Toulouse Engelhardt and Remi Kabaka – A Child's Guide to Einstein (2004)
- Steven T. – Damage (2004)
- Carla Olson – Have Harmony, Will Travel (2013) ~ John sings lead on 2 songs: "First In Line" (written by Paul Kennerley) and "Upon A Painted Ocean" (written by P. F. Sloan). He also plays guitar on the album including on the Richie Furay/Carla Olson version of Gene Clark's "She Don't Care About Time".
