= Gene Parsons =

American drummer, banjo player, guitarist and singer-songwriter (born 1944)

- Born: September 4, 1944 (age 82); Morongo Valley, Mojave Desert, California, U.S.
- Genres: Rock, Country rock, Bluegrass, Country
- Occupations: Musician, songwriter, engineer
- Instruments: drums, guitar, banjo, harmonica, pedal steel, vocals, percussion
- Years active: 1966–present
- Labels: Bakersfield International, Columbia, Warner Bros., Sierra, Stringbender
- Website: http://stringbender.com

Gene Victor Parsons (born September 4, 1944, in Morongo Valley, California) is an American drummer, banjo player, guitarist, singer-songwriter, and engineer, best known for his work with the Byrds from 1968 to 1972. Parsons has also released solo albums and played in bands including Nashville West, the Flying Burrito Brothers, and Parsons Green. Along with guitarist Clarence White, he is credited with inventing the B-Bender (also known as the StringBender)—a device which allows a guitarist to emulate the sound of a pedal steel guitar. The device is often referred to as the Parsons/White B-Bender, a trademarked name.

== Early career and the Byrds ==
Gene Parsons was born on September 4, 1944, on his family's farm in Morongo Valley in the Mojave Desert, California. His professional musical career began when he joined up with guitarist and fiddle player Gib Guilbeau in the duo Guilbeau & Parsons. Later the duo was joined by Clarence White, former guitarist with the Kentucky Colonels, and bassist Wayne Moore to form the band Nashville West, named after a club where the band often performed.

After the dissolution of Nashville West, Parsons was brought into the Byrds by White (who had recently become the band's guitarist), to replace drummer Kevin Kelley. Parsons remained with the band for four years, principally as a drummer, but he also contributed guitar, banjo, harmonica and a number of his own songs to the albums Dr. Byrds & Mr. Hyde, Ballad of Easy Rider, (Untitled), Byrdmaniax and Farther Along.

== Post-Byrds career ==
His first solo album, Kindling, was released in 1973 on Warner Bros. Records, after the Byrds broke up. Although Kindling received positive reviews in music publications such as Rolling Stone, it failed to reach the Billboard Top LPs & Tape chart. Following this, Parsons joined the Flying Burrito Brothers, like other ex-Byrds Chris Hillman, Gram Parsons (no relation) and Michael Clarke had done before him. While he was a member of the Burritos, with Sneaky Pete Kleinow, Chris Ethridge, Skip Battin, Joel Scott Hill and Gib Guilbeau, Parsons contributed a number of songs to the band's Flying Again and Airborne albums, including "Wind and Rain", "Sweet Desert Childhood", and "Out of Control".

After his tenure with the Flying Burrito Brothers ended in 1978, Parsons released a second solo album entitled Melodies in 1979. Since the mid-1980s, he has also released two albums with his ex-wife, California based folk musician Meridian Green, under the moniker of Parsons Green.

During 1994, he was a member of "The Byrds Celebration", a tribute band formed by guitarist Terry Rogers that had originated with former Byrds' drummer Michael Clarke, who had died in 1993, and which also included fellow ex-Byrd Skip Battin. Parsons was also part of the band Haywire (not to be confused with the Canadian band of the same name), along with Joe Craven, Bill Douglass and Will Siegel, and features on the band's 1998 album, Bluegrass Christmas.

In 2001, Parsons released a third solo album, this time a live recording, entitled Gene Parsons in Concert – I Hope They Let Us In, which was released on his own StringBender record label. He also collaborated with British singer-songwriter Julian Dawson on the 2002 album Hillbilly Zen. Parsons teamed with David Hayes in 2016 to release the Gene Parsons & David Hayes album, and, in 2017, the pair formed the Mendocino Quartet with Gwyneth Moreland and Steven Bates, releasing the album Way Out There.

== Other work ==
As well as his work with Nashville West, the Byrds and the Flying Burrito Brothers, Parsons has also played on records by Arlo Guthrie, the Everly Brothers, the Gosdin Brothers, Randy Newman, and Elliott Murphy. He also played on the soundtrack album of the 1970 film Performance, contributing both drums and guitar. His work on the album included playing drums on the track "Memo From Turner", which would end up being Mick Jagger's first single release as a solo artist.

Gene Parsons currently lives in Caspar, California, spending much of his time in his machine shop and customizing guitars with the StringBender device. In a 29 August 2024 radio interview with Daniel Jones (guitarist with 7th Order) on his "The Volcano Chronicles" radio show (KNKR 96.1FM on the Big Island of Hawaii) - Parsons stated that he has been working on an autobiography, and that he is now considering publishing options at this point.

== Selected album discography ==
=== The Byrds ===
- Dr. Byrds & Mr. Hyde (1969)
- Ballad of Easy Rider (1969)
- (Untitled) (1970)
- Byrdmaniax (1971)
- Farther Along (1971)
- Live at the Fillmore – February 1969 (2000)
- Live at Royal Albert Hall 1971 (2008)

=== Gene Parsons ===
- Kindling (1973)
- Melodies (1979)
- Gene Parsons in Concert – I Hope They Let Us In (2001)

=== The Flying Burrito Brothers ===
- Flying Again (1975)
- Airborne (1976)
- Red Album: Live Studio Party in Hollywood (2002)

=== Nashville West ===
- Nashville West (a.k.a. The Legendary Nashville West Album) (1976)

=== Parsons Green ===
- Birds of a Feather (1988)
- Live From Caspar (2001)

=== Haywire ===
- Nature Quest: Bluegrass Christmas (1998)

=== Guilbeau & Parsons ===
- Louisiana Rain (2002)

=== Gene Parsons & David Hayes ===
- Gene Parsons & David Hayes (2016)

=== The Mendocino Quartet ===
- Way Out There (2017)
