= Bob Gibson (musician) =

American musician (1931–1996)

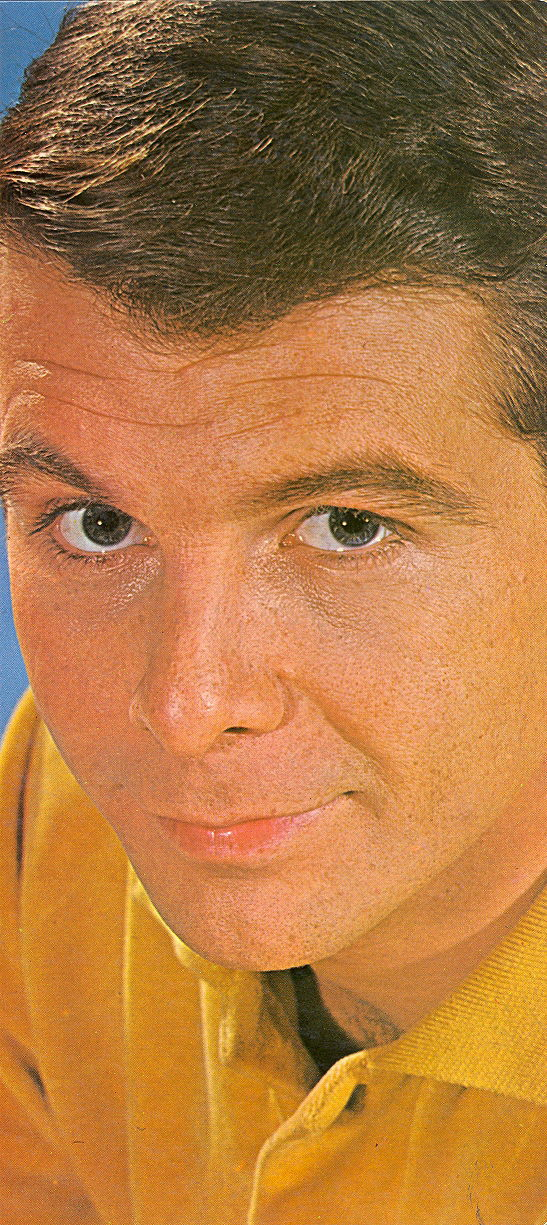
- Gibson, circa 1960

Background information
- Born: Samuel Robert Gibson; November 16, 1931; Brooklyn, New York, U.S.
- Died: September 28, 1996 (aged 64) Portland, Oregon, U.S.
- Genres: Folk
- Occupation: Musician
- Instruments: Guitar; banjo
- Labels: Riverside; Elektra
- Formerly of: Hamilton Camp
- Website: bobgibsonlegacy.com

Samuel Robert Gibson (November 16, 1931 – September 28, 1996) was an American folk musician and a key figure in the folk music revival in the late 1950s and early 1960s. His principal instruments were banjo and 12-string guitar.

He introduced a then-unknown Joan Baez at the Newport Folk Festival of 1959. He produced a number of LPs in the decade from 1956 to 1965. His best known album, Gibson & Camp at the Gate of Horn, was released in 1961. His songs have been recorded by, among others, The Limeliters, Peter, Paul and Mary, Simon & Garfunkel ('You Can Tell The World'), The Seekers, The Byrds, The Smothers Brothers, Phil Ochs, The Kingston Trio and Bob Dylan.

His career was interrupted by his addiction to drugs and alcohol. After getting sober he attempted a comeback in 1978, but the musical scene had changed and his traditional style of folk music was out of favor with young audiences. He did, however, continue his artistic career with albums, musicals, plays, and television performances. In 1993, he was diagnosed with progressive supranuclear palsy (PSP), and died of that disease on September 28, 1996, at the age of 64.

== Biography ==
Gibson was born on November 16, 1931, in Brooklyn, New York, between his older sister Anne and younger brother Jim. He and his siblings grew up in various communities outside New York City – Tuckahoe, Yorktown Heights, and Tompkins Corners. His early interest in music was primarily vocal. He left high school in his senior year and hitchhiked around the country.

Back in New York City in the late 1940s, Gibson took a job at a firm that taught speed reading, where he was responsible for sales and public relations. In 1952, he met and married his wife Rose, who quickly bore three daughters – Barbara (who changed her name to Meridian Green), Pati, and Susan. In 1953, he met Pete Seeger and helped him rebuild his house. So impressed was Gibson with Seeger and his music that he "took the money I had set aside for rent" (to Rose's chagrin) and bought a banjo. He quit his job, became immersed in the study of folk music, and taught himself to play the banjo over the next year. At the age of 22 he began performing at schools, ladies' social clubs, lounges, and cabarets in New York, Miami, Cleveland, and aboard cruise ships traveling to various Caribbean islands. Eventually he was hired at the Green Door in Michigan City, Indiana, 50 miles east of Chicago.

In 1955, he was booked into the Off-Beat Room in Chicago, where he met Albert Grossman. In 1956, Grossman opened the folk club Gate of Horn on the near north side of Chicago, where Gibson performed for eleven months, starting as an opener for many of the acts and later becoming the headliner. Grossman booked numerous talented performers into Gate of Horn, including Josh White, Glenn Yarborough, Odetta, Hamilton Camp, Judy Collins, and Joan Baez. Gibson brought Baez to the 1959 Newport Folk Festival and introduced her for the first time to a national audience.

Gibson steadily gained recognition in Chicago in the early 1960s, aided by Camp. In 1961 their debut album, Gibson and Camp at the Gate of Horn, was released on Elektra Records. A watershed album, it influenced singers from John Lennon and Gordon Lightfoot to John Denver. Lightfoot's "Canadian Railroad Trilogy" was patterned more or less opposite to Gibson and Camp's "Civil War Trilogy".

Art D'Lugoff opened the iconic Village Gate in New York City in 1958, and Gibson and Camp became regular performers there. After they rejected D'Lugoff's suggestion that they add a female voice to their duo, he gave the same recommendation to Peter Yarrow and Paul Stookey; the resulting trio, Peter, Paul and Mary, was deeply influenced by Gibson's music. Yarrow later said of his friend, "When you listen to PPM, you are hearing Bob Gibson."

Shel Silverstein, then a cartoonist at Playboy, was a regular fan and captured Gibson's attention when he completed lyrics to an unfinished Gibson tune. Gibson and Silverstein became close friends and writing partners, writing over 200 songs over the next 35 years. Their last joint project in Nashville in 1993 was the album Makin' A Mess, produced by Silverstein and Kyle Lehning and released on Asylum Records. The last cut, "Whistlers and Jugglers and Singers of Song," was a last-minute substitution when Silverstein realized how ill his friend was. It was written about the relationship of "the trio from out of our past", about a girl who always loved a singer and got together with him several years prior to his death.

=== Drug abuse ===
Gibson began abusing drugs and alcohol as a teenager. By the time of his rise to success in Chicago, he was a heavy user of amphetamines. "Drugs were never recreational for me," he wrote. "My use of them from the beginning was abusive." His drug use escalated when he discovered heroin. Gibson was in and out of jails in Canada (which led to his Christmas carol "Box of Candy and a Piece of Fruit"), Chicago, and Cleveland, for various drug-related charges. In the mid-1960s, he began a three-year period of complete isolation where drugs were his only priority. From 1969 to 1978, he tried repeatedly to restart his career, but his addictions made it impossible. In 1978, he attended an Alcoholics Anonymous meeting in Cleveland and eventually regained his sobriety. A musical comeback, however, was not to be. While he had been a popular and high-profile performer in the 1960s—as well as an important influence on other musicians—by 1978, interest in his purely acoustic folk-styled music had waned significantly. Although many remembered Gibson and he recorded several albums of new music over the next several years, he was never again to capture the mass public appeal of his early 1960s period.

=== Illness and death ===
Around 1990, Gibson began to experience loss of balance, frequent falls, and other neurological symptoms. Later, his vision and then his voice were affected. In 1994 he entered the Mayo Clinic in Jacksonville, Florida where a diagnosis of progressive supranuclear palsy (PSP) was made. With only 20,000 PSP patients in the United States (as opposed, for example, to 500,000 with Parkinson's disease), it was an "orphan disease" and therefore the object of little research. Gibson moved from "my favorite place to live (Mendocino, California)" to Portland, Oregon where PSP was being studied.

As his illness advanced, Gibson invited many of his friends to a farewell "hootenanny" on September 20, 1996, in Chicago:

This may be the last chance I have to see many of you. I am finding it increasingly difficult to do the simplest things and traveling is really a challenge. I won't be able to play and sing with you, but I'm really looking forward to being an audience of one!

Studs Terkel served as host for the event. Gibson tired early, struggled to rise and say goodnight, and received a standing ovation. One week later, on September 28, 1996, he died at the home of his daughter, Susan, in Portland.

In 1997, Gibson was awarded the Lifetime Achievement Award posthumously by the World Folk Music Association.

== Discography ==
Legend: CD (compact disc); CS (cassette); LP (33 1/3 long play)

- Offbeat Folksongs (Riverside, 1956) LP
- I Come for to Sing (Riverside, 1957) LP
- Carnegie Concert (Riverside, 1957) LP
- Folksongs of Ohio (Stinson Records, 1957) 10" LP – Note: Released without Bob Gibson's permission
- There's A Meetin' Here Tonight (Riverside, 1958) LP
- Ski Songs (Elektra, 1959) LP
- Yes I See (Elektra, 1961) LP
- Bob Gibson and Bob Camp at The Gate of Horn (Elektra, 1961) LP
- Folksongs of Ohio (Stinson Records, 1963 reissue of earlier 10" LP) LP – Note: Re-released also without Bob Gibson's permission
- Hootenanny at Carnegie (Riverside, 1963 reissue of Carnegie Concert) LP
- Where I'm Bound (Elektra, 1964) LP
- Bob Gibson (Capitol, 1970) LP
- Funky in the Country (Legend Enterprises, 1974) LP – recorded live at Amazingrace Coffeehouse
- Gibson & Camp, Homemade Music (Mountain Railroad Records, 1978) LP
- The Perfect High (Mountain Railroad Records, 1980) LP
- Uptown Saturday Night (Hogeye Records, 1984) LP
- Best of Friends (1984, on CD, Appleseed Records, 2004), with Tom Paxton and Anne Hills
- Gibson & Camp, The Gate of Horn – Revisited! (B*G Records, 1986) CS
- A Child's Happy Birthday Album (B*G Records, 1989) CS
- Bob Gibson 5/91 – I Hear America Singing (Snapshot Music, 1991) CS
- Stops Along the Way (B*G Records, 1991) CS
- Gibson & Camp, The Gate of Horn – Revisited! (Folk Era Productions, 1994) CD
- Makin' a Mess, Bob Gibson Sings Shel Silverstein (Asylum Records, 1995) CD
- Joy, Joy! The Young and Wonderful Bob Gibson (Riverside, 1996) CD
- Perfect High (re-release of earlier album, 1998) CD
- Bob Gibson and Bob Camp at The Gate of Horn (Collector's Choice, 2002 – re-release of 1961 Elektra LP) CD
- Where I'm Bound (Collector's Choice, 2002 – re-release of 1964 Elektra LP) CD
- The Living Legend Years (Bob Gibson Legacy, 2008 – compilation with selections from Funky in the Country, Homemade Music, The Perfect High, Uptown Saturday Night) CD
- Funky in the Country (Bob Gibson Legacy, 2008 – re-issue of 1974 Legend LP) CD
- Homemade Music (Bob Gibson Legacy, 2008 – re-issue of 1978 Mountain Railroad LP) CD
- The Perfect High (Bob Gibson Legacy, 2008 – re-issue of 1980 Mountain Railroad LP) CD
- Uptown Saturday Night (Bob Gibson Legacy, 2008 – re-issue of 1984 Hogeye LP) CD
- Ski Songs (Collector's Choice, 2008 – re-issue of 1959 Elektra LP) CD
- Yes I See (Collector's Choice, 2008 – re-issue of 1961 Elektra LP) CD
- Live at Cornell 1957 (Rediscover Music 2011) Triple CD.
