= B-Bender =

Guitar accessory

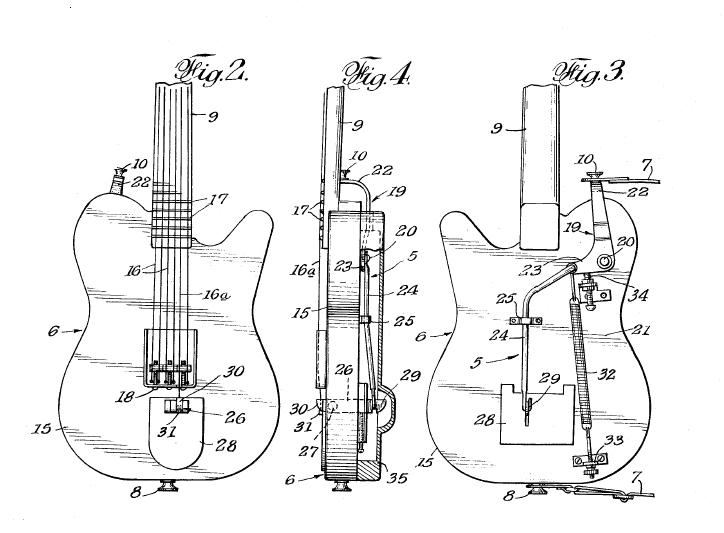
- Fig.A The first B-Bender was the Parsons/White Pull-String

Other instrument
- Classification: Guitar accessory
- Inventor(s): Gene Parsons and Clarence White
- Developed: 1968

Playing range
- A minor third

A B-Bender is a guitar accessory that enables a player to fluidly alter the pitch of a guitar's B-string. This works by mechanically bending the B-string through the use of a series of levers and/or pulleys attached to an external lever that is controlled by the player.

There are several different designs, but all use levers or pulleys inside or outside the guitar body that are activated by a pull or push of the guitar neck, body, or bridge. The resulting tone sounds much like a pedal steel guitar and contributes a "country" feeling. The original device, named the "Pull-String" or "StringBender" in various iterations, was designed, built, and installed by musicians Gene Parsons and Clarence White, and as such the device is sometimes called the "Parsons-White B-Bender". Parsons licensed the device for use by several electric guitar manufacturers, but the bulk of the first decade and a half of production was done by Parsons himself, building and installing an estimated 2000 kits before he outsourced the production and installation to other companies.

Originally designed for the Fender Telecaster, B-Benders are now available to fit many solid body electric guitars, and even acoustic guitars.

Guitar solo using a B-Bender
On this 1969 recording of "Tulsa County Blue" by The Byrds, guitarist Clarence White plays a Telecaster equipped with a B-Bender device.

== History ==
The B-Bender was invented in 1968 by musicians Gene Parsons and Clarence White of Nashville West and The Byrds. The device was originally called the Parsons/White Pull-String, later renamed the StringBender, and is now best known as the B-Bender. Early prototypes developed by Parsons (a machinist as well as a drummer) included multiple bending devices for the E, B, G and D strings, but guitarist White decided he preferred a single B string bender in the final design. The B string is bent up a full tone by pulling the guitar neck down. This applies tension in the strap, which is attached to a spring-loaded lever at the base of the neck. The lever arm passes through the body of the guitar and is connected to the B string behind the bridge (Figure A). White's 1956 Telecaster with the original Pull-String is now owned and regularly played by Marty Stuart, who bought it from White's widow.

Another early maker and user of the Pull-String was Bob Warford, a friend and Kentucky Colonels bandmate of White's who also played guitar with Linda Ronstadt and The Everly Brothers. Warford made his own Pull-String in early 1968 based on the Parsons/White design, with their consent, and installed it in his Telecaster. Later that year, Parsons and White licensed the StringBender to Leo Fender at Fender Musical Instruments Corporation. Fender revised the design to simplify mass production and developed a prototype. However, this model never went into production. Parsons and White subsequently licensed their design to Dave Evans, who had heard about the device and had been experimenting with his own models. Evans built and sold a version of the Pull-String from 1969 to 1973. His customers included Albert Lee, John Beland (guitarist for Linda Ronstadt) and Eagles guitarist Bernie Leadon, who played his Evans Pull-String on "Peaceful Easy Feeling".

In 1973 Parsons started making and installing the Pull-String himself, and renamed it the StringBender. He eventually made as many as 2,000 custom installations for guitarists including Ronnie Wood of The Rolling Stones. Harold Matlin of Matlin Guitars built one for Jimmy Page of Led Zeppelin. Parsons also supplied several hundred StringBender kits to Japanese guitar manufacturer Tokai Gakki. In 1989, when demand overtook his production capacity, Parsons partnered with Meridian Green to outsource the production of the kits, develop a network of authorized installation shops and write an instruction manual for the installers. Green also approached Fender again, and the Fender Custom Shop began producing a Clarence White signature model custom Telecaster equipped with the Parsons/White StringBender. Around 200 were produced, and based on this success, Fender decided to mass-produce a similar model and call it the B-Bender. Parsons and Green revised the design again, and in 1996 Fender began production of the Nashville B-Bender Telecaster incorporating the Parsons/Green StringBender.

Shortly after Clarence White was killed by a drunk driver while loading equipment into his van with his brother Roland after a gig, Richard Bowden, former Linda Ronstadt and Dan Fogelberg guitarist, joined Roger McGuinn's post-Byrds organization and Bowden created his own B-Bender. Being a Gibson player and with String Benders only available for Telecasters, Bowden created a non-defacing palm pedal that attached to the standard Gibson-style stop-bar tail piece. He leased his patent to Gibson, who turned it over to Epiphone for production. Due to manufacturing flaws, Epiphone discontinued production when their patent lease expired after ten years. Bowden now manufactures his device in his own custom shop and has expanded his designs to also fit on Telecasters, G&L ASAT Tribute Specials, and Stratocasters, as well as many acoustic guitars.

== Variations ==
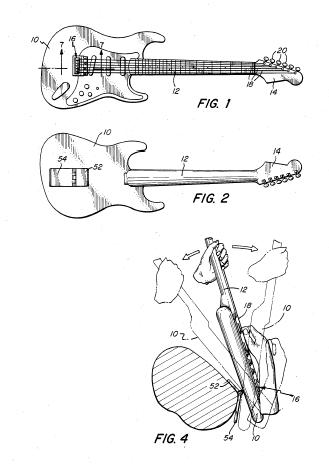
Fig. B The Hennessey model bends a string both up and down

Another type of B-Bender is activated by the picking hand, like the Bigsby vibrato tailpiece. Unlike the Parsons/White model, this type does not require any structural modifications to the guitar body and is simply installed with a few screws. Examples are the Bigsby Palm Pedal, the Bowden B Bender (non-defacing to guitar - inventor, Richard Bowden), the Hipshot Palm Lever, and the Duesenberg Guitars Multibender. Each of these can bend multiple strings using different levers.

The Hipshot B-Bender, developed by David Borisoff, also mounts to the tailpiece end of the guitar without requiring any modifications. A lever extends behind the guitar and rests against the player's body. The bender is activated by moving the whole guitar against the player's body. The Hipshot is used by Will Ray of the Hellecasters. While this version bends the string up, James Hennessey developed a version that can bend the string either up or down, although mounting it requires modification of the guitar body (Figure B.)

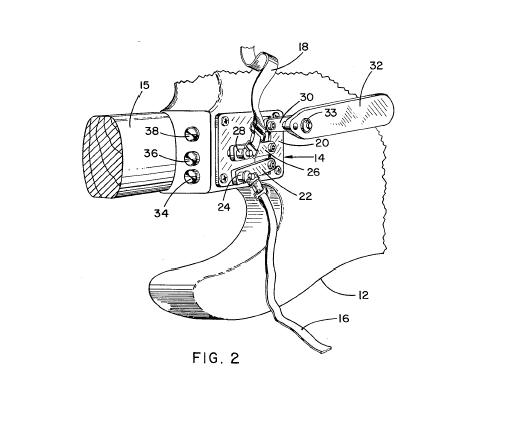
Fig. C The Glaser design bends one, two or three strings independently

The same type of mechanics can be applied to other strings besides the B, with the G string being the most common. Brad Paisley is a well-known proponent of the "G-Bender" and uses a model from Charlie McVay. "Double Benders" can bend both the B and G strings independently. The B string pull operates like the Parsons/White design, by pushing the neck down against the strap. The G string pull uses a push-away motion of the neck and depends on a lanyard attached to the player's belt.

A variation developed by Joseph Glaser can bend up to three different strings independently. Like the Double Benders, Glaser's design uses a downward pull of the guitar neck to bend one string and a push-away against a belt lanyard to bend a second string. The third string bend (such as the low E string) uses a backward pull of the neck toward the player's body (see Figure C.) Jimmy Olander of Diamond Rio has Glaser Double-Benders (B & G) in his instruments, with the G string activated by his shoulder strap and the B string by a belt lanyard. Unlike most bender players, Olander uses them more for stylistic enhancement than for a steel guitar sound. Other notable users of Glaser benders include Dan Schafer, Ricky Skaggs, Keith Richards and Mick Taylor.
