= Fender Telecaster =

Solid body electric guitar

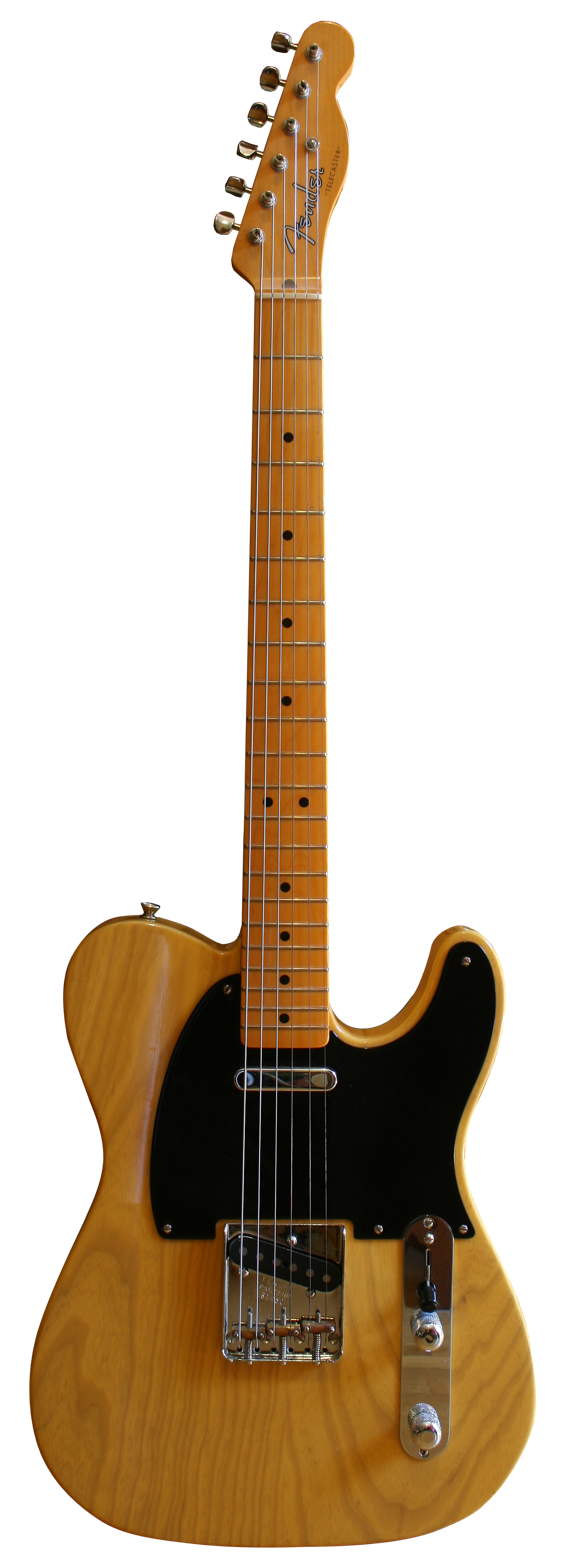
- Manufacturer: Fender
- Period: 1949; 1950–present

Construction
- Body type: Solid
- Neck joint: Bolt-on
- Scale: 25.5 inches (647.7 mm)

Woods
- Body: Alder; Ash; Poplar; Pine; Basswood
- Neck: Maple
- Fretboard: Maple; Rosewood; Pau ferro

Hardware
- Bridge: Proprietary "Ashtray" or modern style with string-through or top-load strings. Since 2017, the Professional Series Teles feature a clip-on partial bridge cover.
- Pickups: Traditionally two single-coils; Other pickup configurations are available

Colors available
- 2 or 3 maple color sunbursts; Shades of blonde (translucent earth tones); sonic blue, red, surf green, yellow, wine red

The Fender Telecaster, colloquially known as the Tele, is an electric guitar produced by Fender. Together with its sister model the Esquire, it was the world's first mass-produced, commercially successful (Note: Les Paul had built a prototype solid-body electric guitar known as "The Log" in the 1940s, but could not market his invention. Gibson produced the Gibson Les Paul guitar in 1952 after bringing on Paul to help design a commercial model to compete with Fender. Likewise, Paul Bigsby and Merle Travis designed and built a solid-body electric in 1948, but this was a one-off guitar.) solid-body electric guitar. Its simple yet effective design and revolutionary sound broke ground and set trends in electric guitar manufacturing and popular music. Many prominent rock musicians have been associated with the Telecaster for use in studio recording and live performances, most notably Albert Collins, Muddy Waters, James Burton, Steve Cropper, Steve Howe, and Jimmy Page.

It was introduced for national distribution as the Broadcaster in the autumn of 1950 as a two-pickup version of its sister model, the single-pickup Esquire. The pair were the first guitars of their kind manufactured on a substantial scale. A trademark conflict with a rival manufacturer, Gretsch, over its Broadkaster drum kit, led to the guitar being renamed in 1951. Initially, the Broadcaster name was simply cut off the labels placed on the guitars (leading to a limited run of nameless guitars known unofficially as Nocasters) and later in 1951, the final name of Telecaster was applied to the guitar to take advantage of the advent of television. The Telecaster quickly became a popular model, and has remained in continuous production since its first incarnation.

Like the three-pickup Stratocaster that followed it in 1954, the Telecaster is a versatile guitar and has been used in many genres, including country, reggae, rock, pop, folk, soul, blues, jazz, punk, metal, alternative, indie rock, and R&B. The base model has always been available, and other than a change to the pickup selector switch configuration, a thinning of the neck, and a few variations on the bridge design, it has remained mostly unchanged from the 1950s. Several variant models have been produced over the years including those with different pickup configurations and electronics, semi-hollow body designs, and even a twelve string model.

== Overall design ==
The archetypical Fender Telecaster is a solid-body electric guitar with a flat asymmetric single-cutaway body; the body is usually made from alder or swamp ash. The bolt-on neck is usually made from maple and is attached to the body with screws; it has a distinctive small headstock with six tuning pegs mounted inline along a single side; the fingerboard may be maple or another wood, e.g. rosewood, and has at least twenty-one frets. The Telecaster's body is front-routed for electronics; the bridge pickup is mounted in a metal plate attached to the guitar's bridge, other pickups are mounted in a plastic pickguard, and the controls are mounted in a metal plate on the lower bout of the guitar. Most Telecasters have two single-coil pickups, a pickup selector switch, a single volume control and a single tone control. Fixed bridges are almost universal, and the original design has three individually adjustable dual-string saddles whose height and tuning can be set independently. (Many newer models have six saddles.) The output jack is mounted on the edge of the lower bout of the guitar. Many different colors have been available. The Telecaster's scale length is 25.5 inches (64.8 cm).

There have been minor changes to the design over the years, and models with features that differ from the archetypical design. However, the essential character of the design has remained constant.

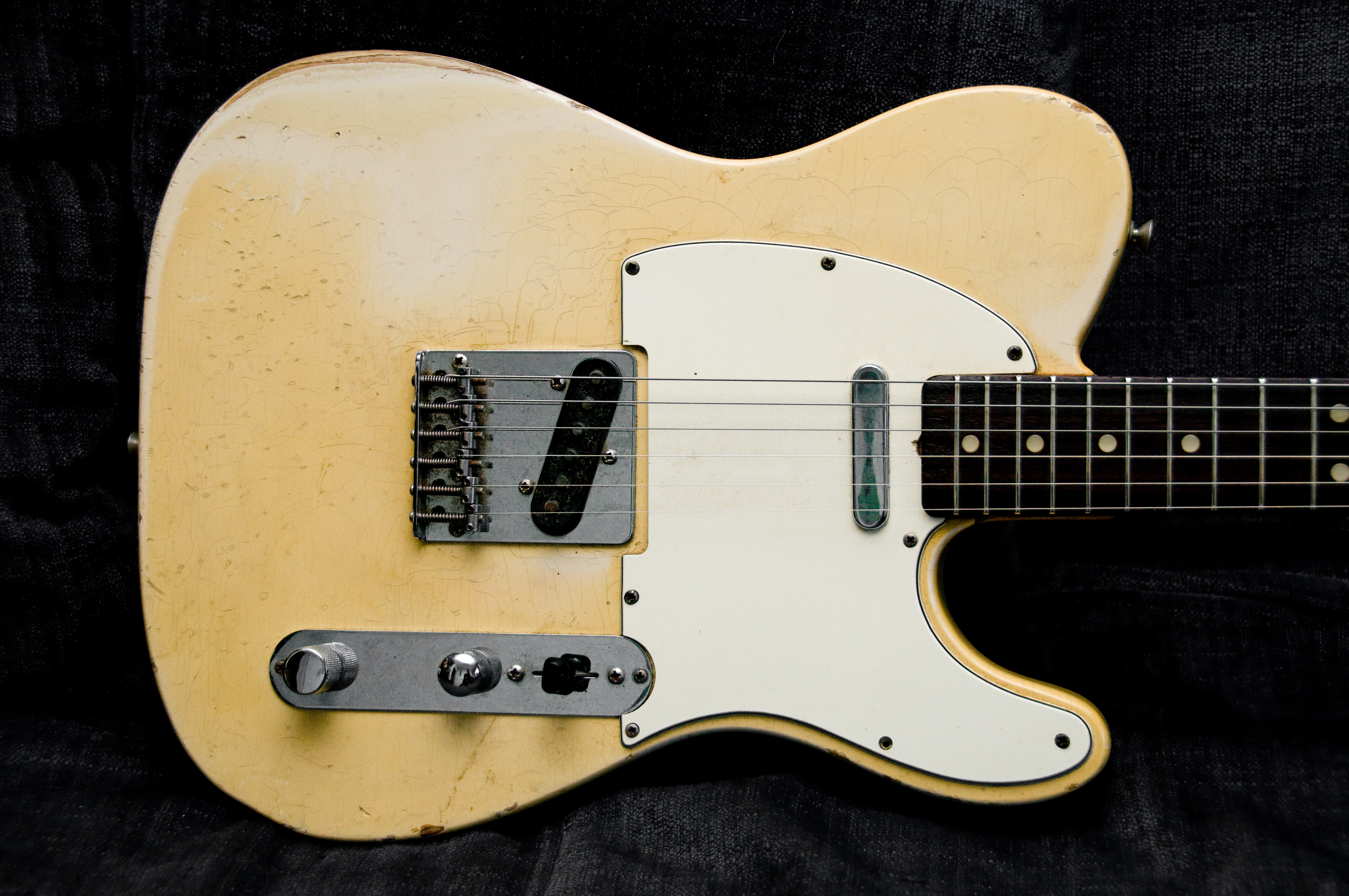
Body and electronics

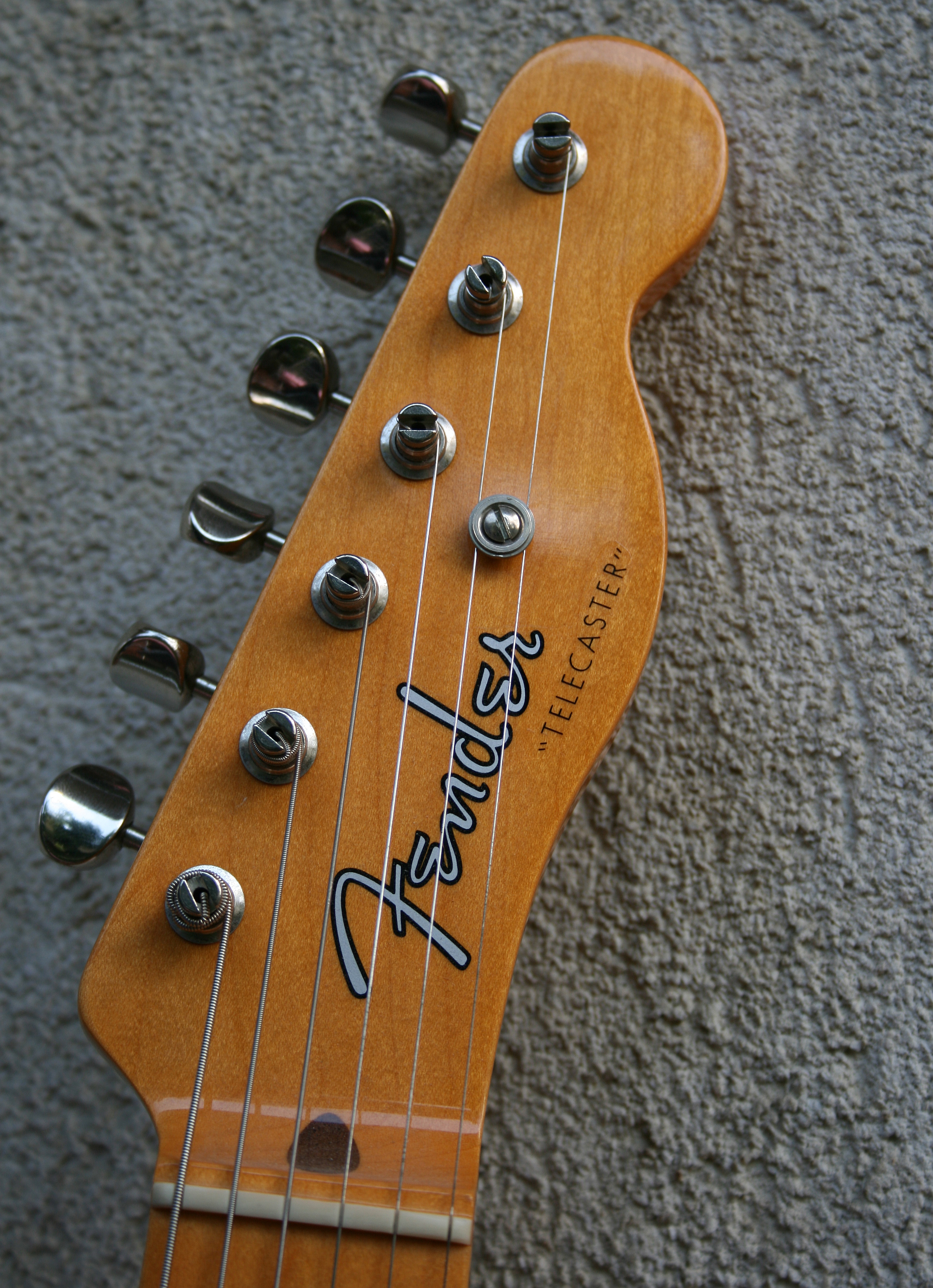
Headstock

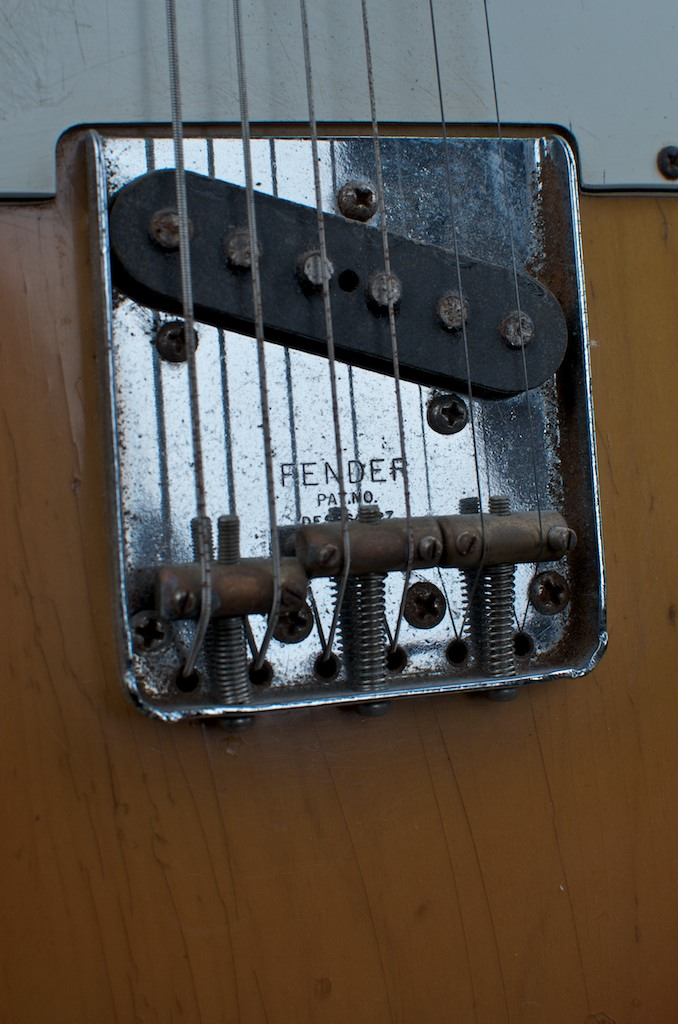
Detail of the bridge

== Origins ==
Telecaster evolution

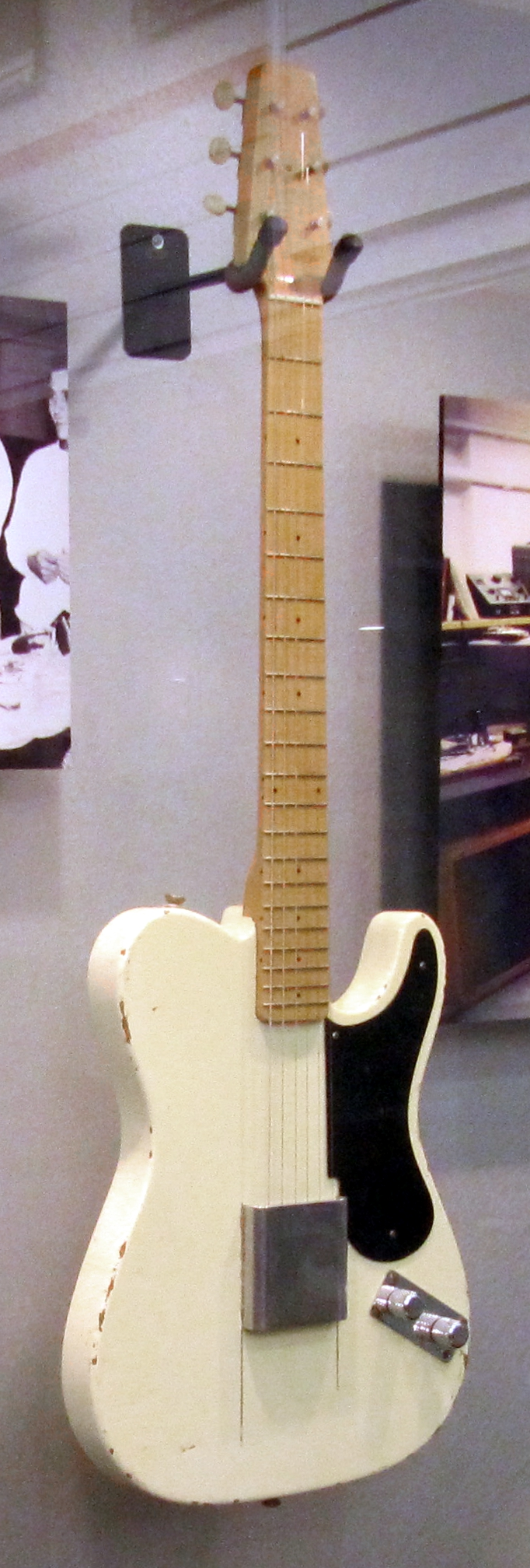
1st prototype (1949)

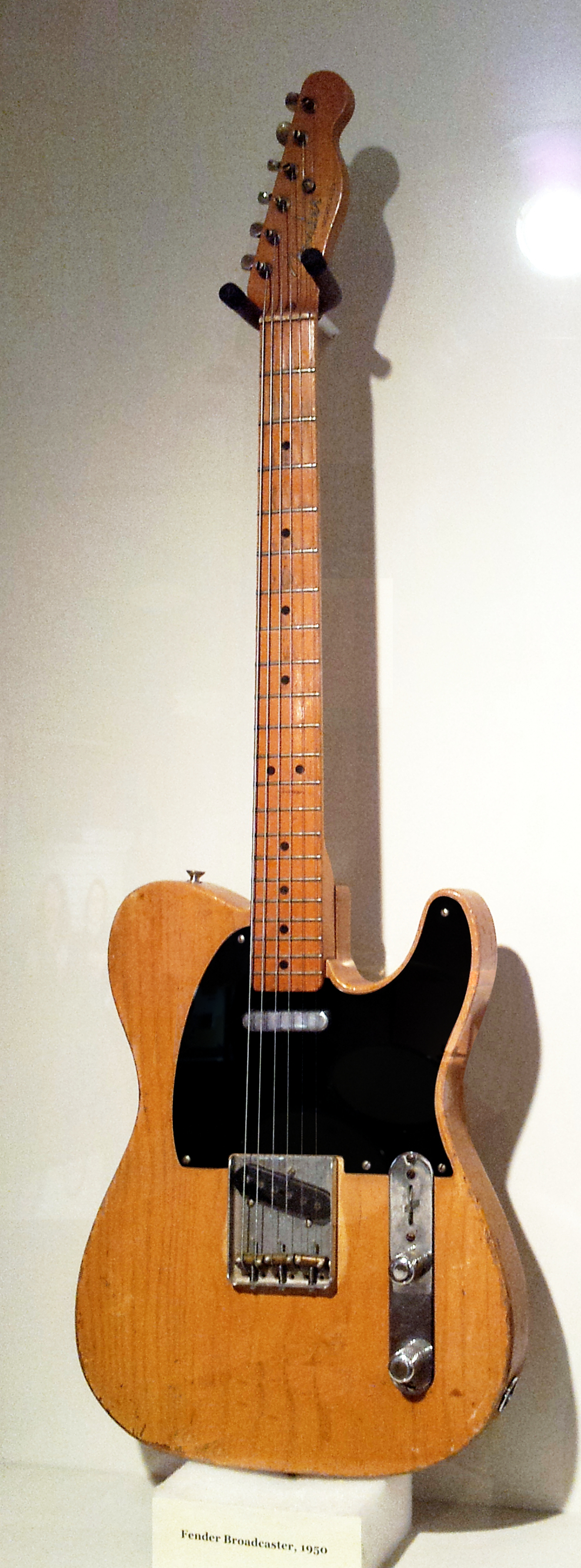
Broadcaster (1950)

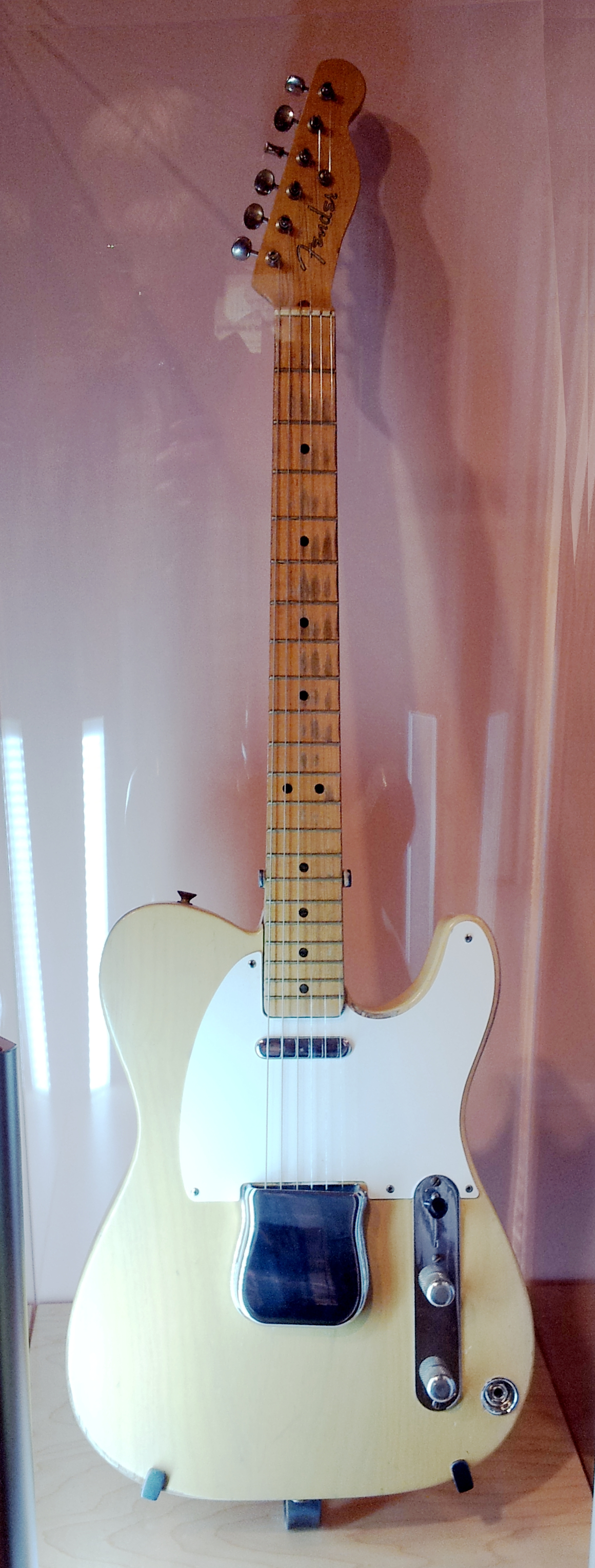
"Nocaster" (1951)

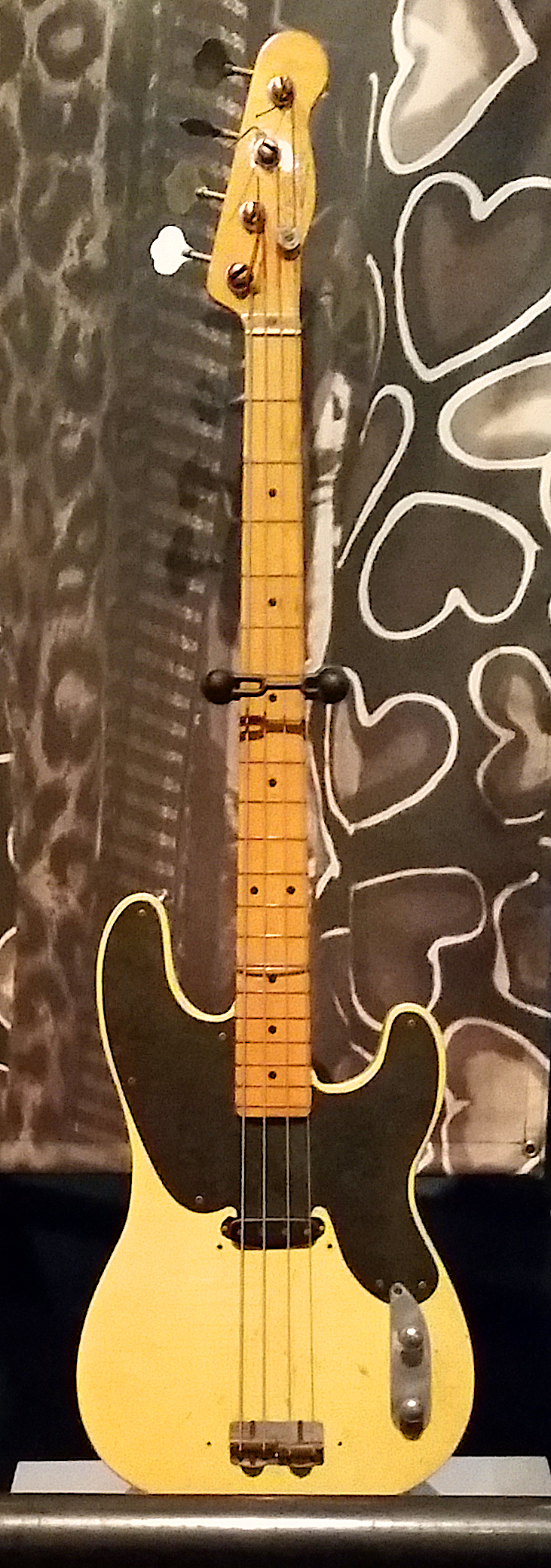
Precision Bass (1951)

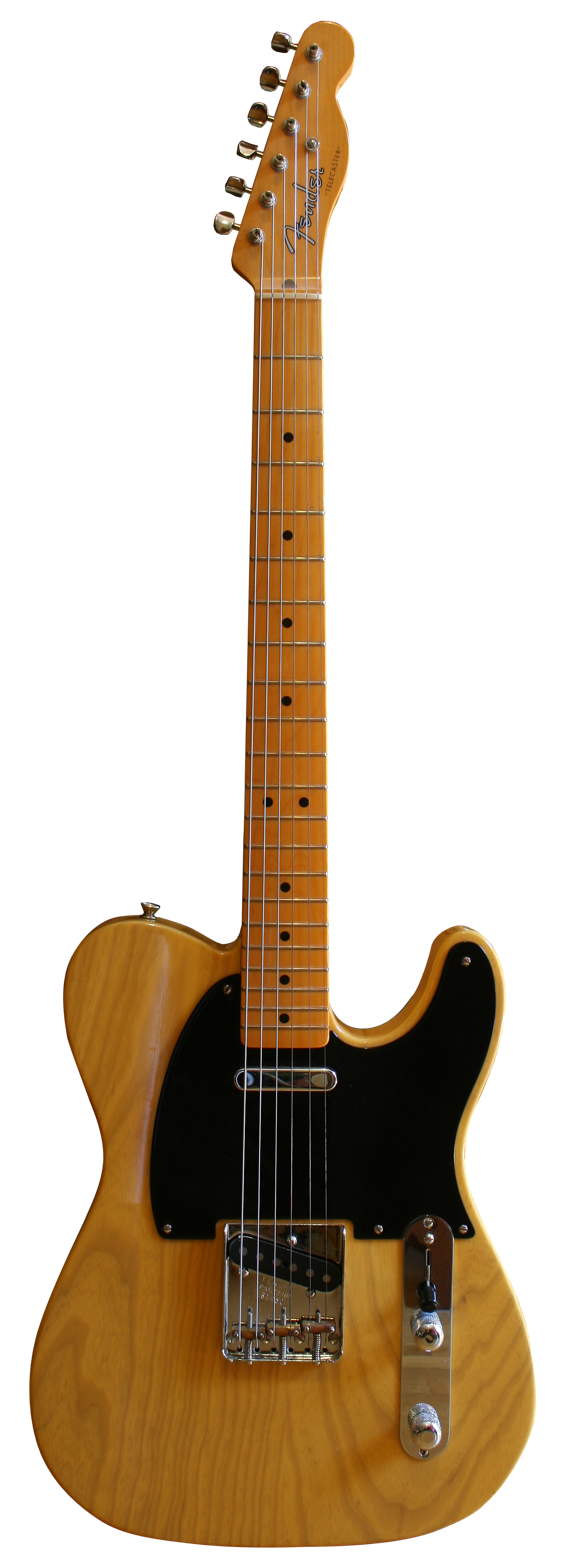
Telecaster (1952)

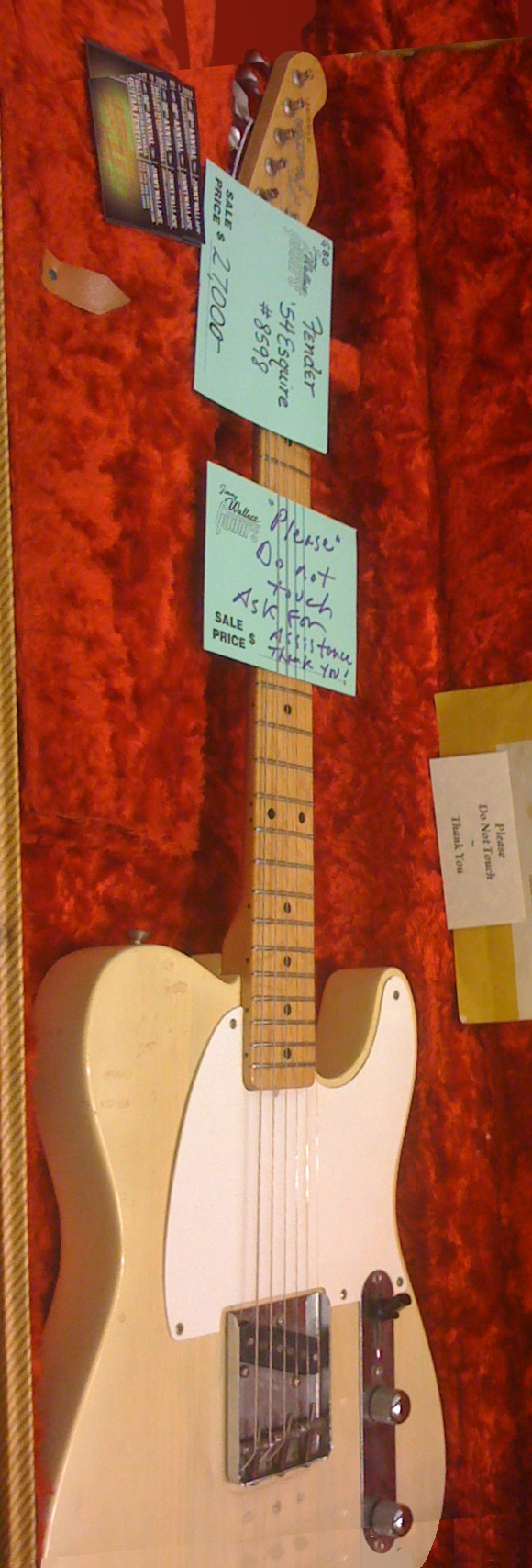
Esquire (1954)

The Fender Telecaster was developed by Leo Fender in Fullerton, California, in 1949 and 1950. In the period roughly between 1932 and 1949, several craftsmen and companies experimented with solid-body electric guitars, but none had made a significant impact on the market. Leo Fender's Telecaster was the design that made bolt-on neck, solid body guitars viable in the marketplace.

Fender had an electronics repair shop, named Fender's Radio Service, where he first repaired, then designed, amplifiers and electromagnetic pickups for musicians—chiefly players of electric semi-acoustic guitars, electric Hawaiian lap steel guitars, and mandolins. Players had been "wiring up" their instruments in search of greater volume and projection since the late 1920s, and electric semi-acoustics (such as the Gibson ES-150) had long been widely available. Tone had never, until then, been the primary reason for a guitarist to go electric, but in 1943, when Fender and his partner, Clayton Orr "Doc" Kauffman, built a crude wooden guitar as a pickup test rig, local country players started asking to borrow it for gigs. It sounded bright and sustaining.

Fender's operations expanded to include a line of lap steel guitars, and several of the features of those instruments would be borrowed for a new electric solid-bodied guitar. In 1949, he began prototyping the new instrument. Though it was long understood that solid construction offered great advantages in electric instruments (and by the 1930s, Audiovox had offered a solid-body makeshift electric guitar), no commercial solid-body had ever caught on. Leo felt that it could be successfully done. It was designed in the spirit of the solid-body Hawaiian guitars manufactured by Rickenbacker—small, simple units made of Bakelite and aluminum with the parts bolted together—but with wooden construction. (Rickenbacker, then spelled "Rickenbacher", also offered a solid Bakelite-bodied electric Spanish guitar in 1935 that seemed to presage details of Fender's design.)

Most development guitars were discarded by Fender, but two prototypes survived destruction. An earlier 2-piece pine example was built in summer of 1949 with a headstock design borrowed from the company's lap steels, but otherwise possessing most of the features of what would become the Esquire (as the neck pickup had not been added at this stage). The second prototype from later that year featured an ash body and the final headstock design. The bridge pickup was based on a modified version of the company's Champion lap steel guitar's pickup.

The new model had not been made available for the 1949 NAMM Convention and Fender's sales manager, Don Randall, complained that other manufacturers had featured guitars with multiple pickups.

=== 1950 ===
The initial single-pickup production model appeared as the Fender Esquire in 1950. Ash and maple were used to construct the body and neck respectively and the guitar came in one color—blond. It was priced at $139.95 (equivalent to $1,736 in 2025). Fewer than fifty guitars were originally produced under that name, and most were replaced under warranty because of early manufacturing problems. In particular, the Esquire necks had no truss rod and many were replaced due to bent necks. Later in 1950, this single-pickup model was discontinued, and a two-pickup model was renamed the Broadcaster. From this point onward all Fender necks incorporated truss rods. The Esquire was reintroduced in 1951 as a single pickup variant, at a lower price.

=== 1951 ===
As a result of legal action from the Gretsch company over the guitar's name, the Broadcaster (Gretsch already had the "Broadkaster" name registered for a line of drums), factory workers simply snipped the "Broadcaster" name from its existing stock of decals, so guitars with these decals are identified simply as "Fender", without any model name.

The term Nocaster was later coined by collectors to denote these transitional guitars that appeared without a model name on the headstock. Since they were manufactured in this form for 8–9 months in 1951, original Nocasters are highly prized by collectors. There are no official production numbers, but experts estimate that fewer than 500 Nocasters were produced. Fender has since registered Nocaster as a trademark to denote its modern replicas of this famous rarity.

Around September 1951, Fender renamed the guitar to Telecaster and started placing these decals on the headstock. Debuting with a transparent butterscotch finish, single ply 'Blackguard', maple neck with walnut back stripe, the Telecaster would go on to become the most successfully mass-produced electric guitar in history.

In 1951, Fender released the Precision Bass as a similar looking stable-mate to the Telecaster. This body style was later released as the Fender Telecaster Bass in 1968, after the Precision Bass had been changed in 1957 to make it more closely resemble the Fender Stratocaster guitar. This double cut away style was the shape that influenced how the Fender Stratocaster was created. At the time Leo Fender began marketing the newly designed Stratocaster in 1954, he expected it to replace the Blackguard Telecaster, but the Telecaster remains in demand to the present day.

=== 1952 ===
By 1952, Leo Fender was clear of any patent or naming infringements, and the Fender company began producing the Telecaster guitar in larger numbers. These early models produced between 1950 and 1954 would become known as Blackguards.

In late 1952, Fender made several changes to the circuitry of the guitar. First, a true tone control knob was installed, that could be used to alter the tone from bass-heavy (in the 0 position) to treble-heavy (in the 10 position). The first switch position stayed the same as before, with the neck pickup in "dark circuit" treble-cut mode. In this position, the tone knob was disabled. The middle position turned off the dark circuit, and turned on the tone control knob for the neck pickup. The third position selected the bridge pick-up alone, again with an active tone control knob. Although this provided the player with a proper tone control, the change also made it impossible to blend the signal from both pickups. In late 1967 Fender again modified the circuit. They removed the "dark circuit" from the first position, and installed what has become the standard twin pickup switching system: neck pickup alone with tone control in the first position, both pickups together with the tone control in the middle position and in the third position the bridge pickup alone with the tone control.

== Construction ==
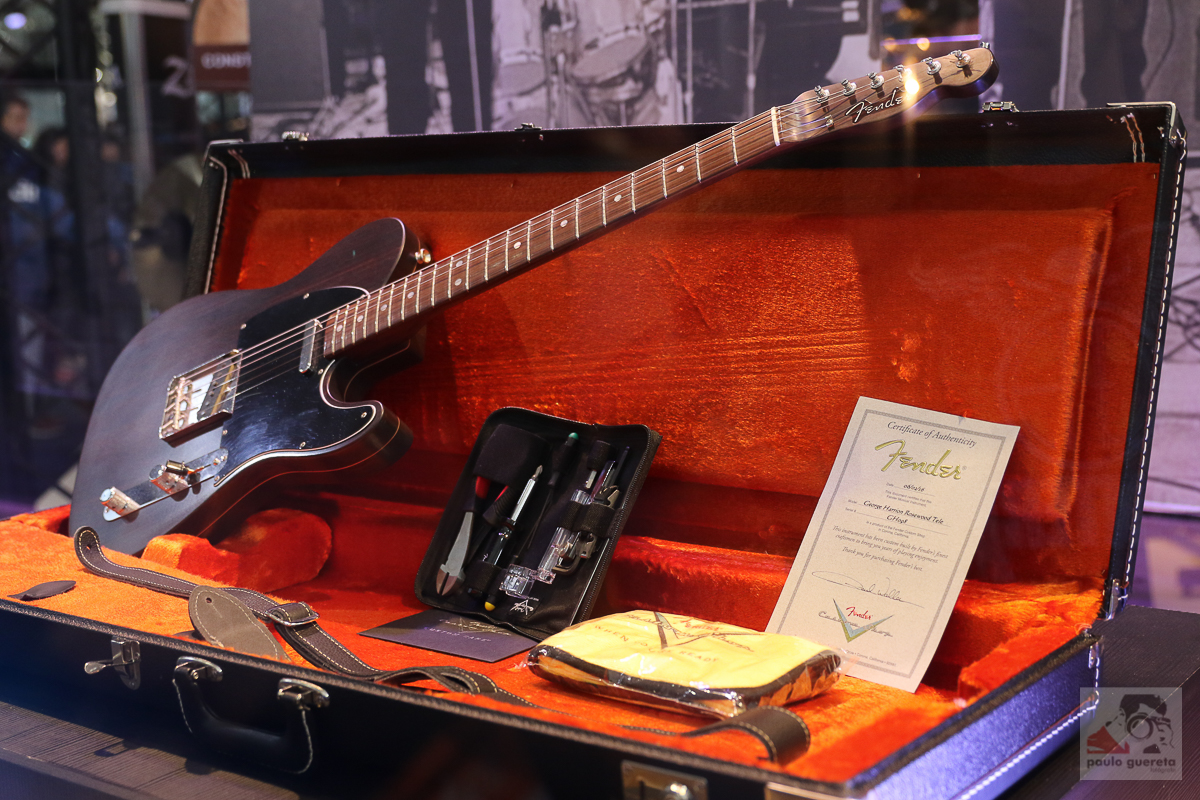
A Fender Custom Shop rendition of George Harrison's rosewood Telecaster on display in 2016

Leo Fender's simple and modular design was both geared to mass production and simplified servicing of broken guitars. Rather than being constructed individually as in traditional luthiery, instruments were produced quickly and inexpensively from components on an assembly line. The bodies were bandsawn and routed from slabs, rather than hand-carved individually, as with other guitars made at the time, such as Gibsons. Fender did not use the traditional hide-glued set-in neck, but rather a bolt-on neck (which is actually attached using screws). This simple but crude production method also allowed the neck to be easily removed and serviced, or quickly replaced entirely. In addition, the classic Telecaster neck was fashioned from a single piece of maple without a separate fingerboard, its frets slid into a groove cut directly into the wood. The very design of the headstock (inspired by Croatian instruments, according to Leo Fender) followed that simplicity principle: it is very narrow, since it was cut in a single piece of wood (without glued "wings"). Nonetheless, it is very effective, as the six strings are kept straight behind the nut, keeping the guitar in tune. While this has changed over time with new reincarnations of the guitar, this was a highly unorthodox approach in its day as guitars traditionally featured rosewood or ebony fingerboards glued onto mahogany necks. The electronics were easily accessed for repair or replacement through a removable control plate, a great advantage over the construction of the then-predominant hollow-body instruments, in which the electronics could be accessed only through the sound holes.

In its classic form, the guitar is simply constructed, with the neck and fingerboard comprising a single piece of maple, screwed to an ash or alder body inexpensively jigged with flat surfaces on the front and back. The hardware includes two single coil pickups controlled by a three-way selector switch, and one each of volume and tone controls. The pickguard was first Bakelite, soon thereafter it was celluloid (later other plastics), screwed directly onto the body with five (later eight) screws. The bridge has three adjustable saddles, with strings doubled up on each. In its original design nearly all components are secured using only screws (body, neck, tuners, bridge, scratchplate, pickups to body, control plate, output socket), with glue used to secure the nut and solder used to connect the electronic components. With the introduction of the truss rod, and later a rosewood fingerboard, more gluing was required during construction. The guitar quickly gained a following, and soon other, more established guitar companies (such as Gibson, whose Les Paul model was introduced in 1952, and later Gretsch, Rickenbacker, and others) began working on wooden solid-body production models of their own.

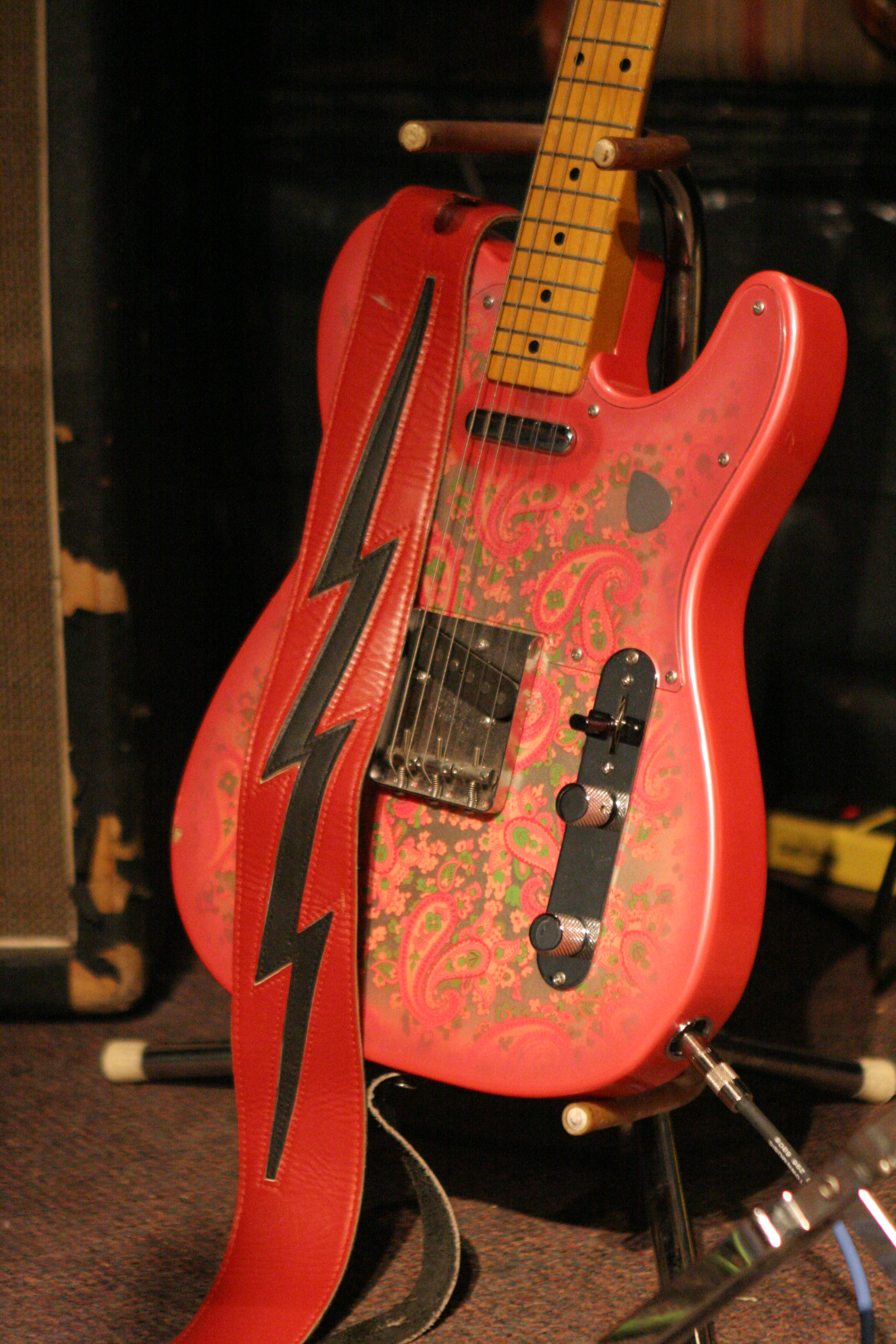
A Telecaster in "Paisley Red" (originally released during 1968–69)

The Telecaster has always had a three-position selector switch to allow for different pickup configurations, as well as two knobs for controlling volume and tone. However, different eras had different functions for these controls. The original switch and knob configuration was used from 1950 to 1952. The first position (switch towards neck) activated the neck pickup with treble tone cut, which produced a muffled, bass-heavy tone (sometimes called the "dark circuit"). The middle position selected the neck pickup without the treble cut, giving it a fuller sound, and in the third position had both pickups together and activated the tone knob. On these models, the tone knob acted as a blending knob, with the "0" position using only the bridge pickup, blending to a 50/50 neck/bridge mix in the "10" position. The first knob functioned normally as a master volume control.

Pickguards were exclusively black until 1955. The same year, the serial number was moved from the bridge to the neck plate.

Typical modern Telecasters (such as the American Standard version) incorporate several details different from the classic form. They typically feature 22 frets (rather than 21) and truss rod adjustments are made at the headstock end, or the body end depending on the model (typically at the head-stock in newer models). The body end requires removal of the neck.

== The Telecaster sound ==
Bridge pickup, crunch sound
Squier Telecaster bridge pickup with some overdrive

Neck pickup, crunch sound
Squier Telecaster neck pickup with some overdrive

The Telecaster is popular because of its ability to produce both a bright, rich cutting tone (the typical Telecaster country twang) and a mellow, warm, bluesy jazz tone depending on the selected pickup, respectively "bridge" pickup or "neck" pickup, and by adjusting the tone control. This makes the Telecaster a versatile instrument that can be used for different musical styles and sounds, allowing performers to change styles and sounds without changing instruments. The bridge pickup has more windings than the neck pickup, hence producing higher output, which compensates for a lower amplitude of vibration of the strings at the bridge position. In standard models built between 1967 and 1987, a capacitor bridging the input and output of the volume potentiometer allowed treble frequencies to bleed through even when the volume was turned down. Slanting the bridge pickup also increased the guitar's treble response. The solid body allows the guitar to deliver a clear and sustaining amplified version of the strings' sound; this was an improvement over previous electric guitar designs, whose resonant hollow bodies made them prone to unwanted acoustic feedback when volume was increased. These design elements intentionally allowed guitarists to emulate steel guitar sounds, as well as "cut through" and be heard in roadhouse Honky-Tonk and big Western Swing bands, initially making this guitar particularly useful in country music. Since this, Fender has developed even more in the way of pickups and tones for the Telecaster, with changes from Alnico III magnets to Alnico V magnets.

== Variants ==
The Telecaster has long been a favorite guitar for "hot-rod" customizing. Several variants have appeared throughout the years with a wide assortment of pickup configurations, such as a humbucker in the neck position, three single-coil pickups, and even dual humbuckers with special wiring schemes. Fender offered factory hot-rodded Teles with such pickup configurations, the US Fat and Nashville B-Bender Telecasters around 1998. The Deluxe Blackout Tele was also equipped with three single-coil pickups, a "Strat-o-Tele" selector switch and a smaller headstock than a standard Telecaster. Some also preferred vibratos on their Telecasters, installing a Bigsby on them. The most common variants of the standard two-pickup solid body Telecaster are the semi-hollow Thinline, the Custom, which replaced the neck single coil-pickup with a humbucking pickup, and the twin-humbucker Deluxe. The Custom and Deluxe were introduced during the CBS period and reissues of both designs are currently offered.

=== Telecaster Thinline ===
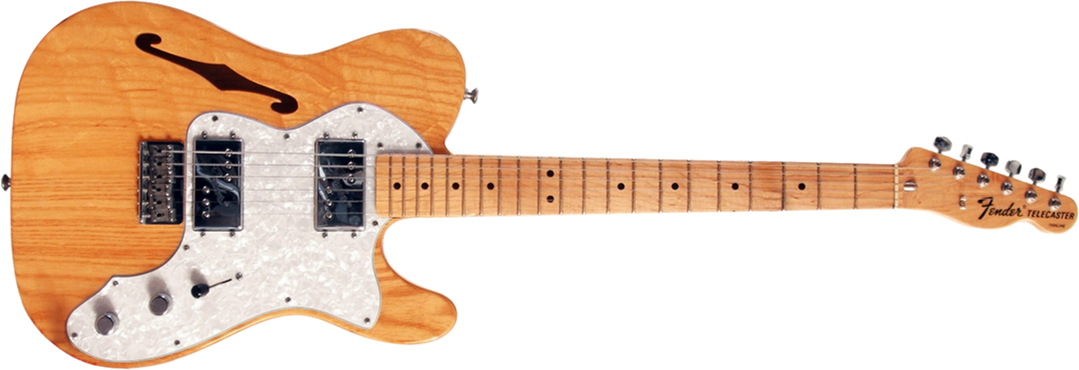

Designed by German luthier Roger Rossmeisl, the Telecaster Thinline model first appeared in 1968. It is characterized by a body having a solid center core with hollow wings to reduce weight. The '68 version has two standard Telecaster single-coil pickups, string-through-body bridge, and a choice of an ash or mahogany body. A later version was introduced in 1972 based on the Fender Telecaster Deluxe with two Fender Wide Range humbucking pickups. In 2011, Fender released the Modern Player Telecaster Thinline as a part of the Modern Player series. This guitar features two MP-90 pickups, similar to the Gibson P-90 and a mahogany body. The Fender Custom Shop has produced a variation referred to as the "50s Telecaster Thinline" with an ash body, maple neck and a Twisted Tele neck pickup matched with a Nocaster bridge pickup.

=== Telecaster Custom ===
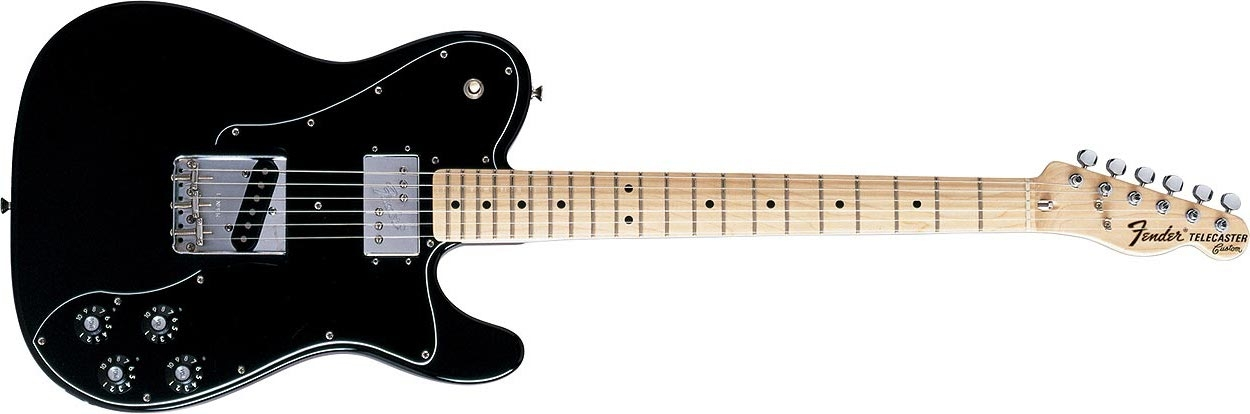

The first edition of the Telecaster Custom was introduced in 1959 as a more ornate alternative to the standard Telecaster, featuring a double-bound body and options of a burst finish and rosewood fretboard, but otherwise maintained the standard configuration. While the guitar was known as the Telecaster Custom, the decal on the headstock read "Custom Telecaster." In 1972, the Custom was redesigned to include Fender's new Wide Range humbucker in the neck position with a single-coil pickup still in the bridge, mimicking a modification popularized by Keith Richards.

=== Telecaster Deluxe ===
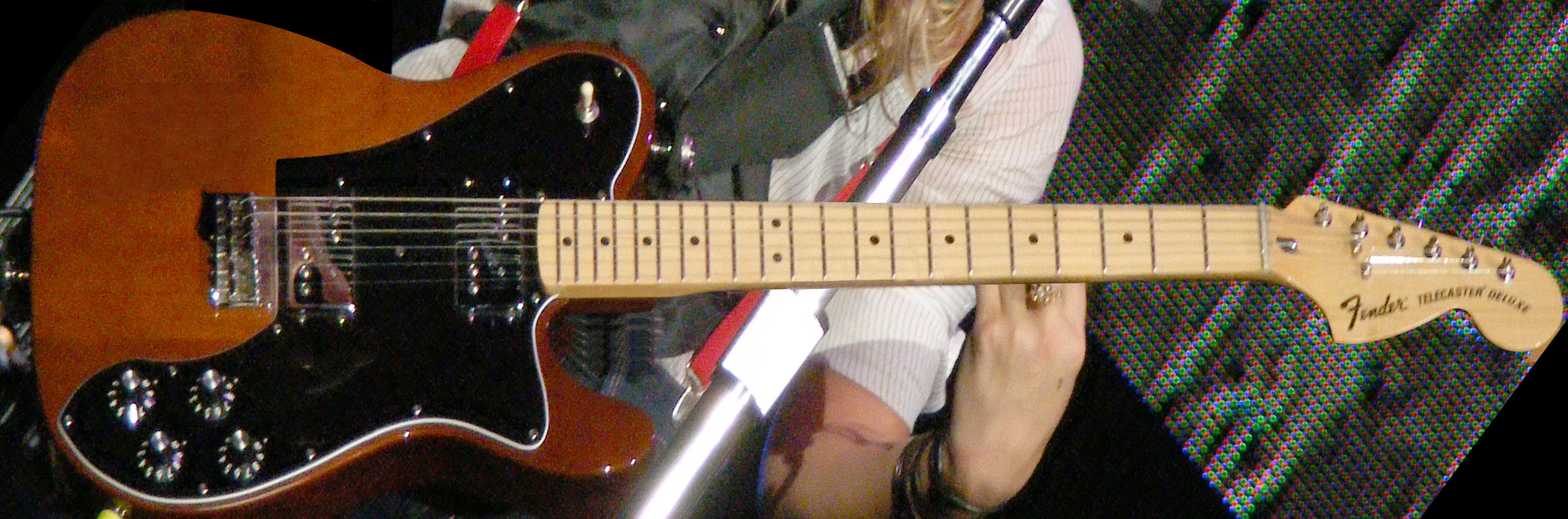

This model includes two Fender Wide Range humbucking pickups and was originally produced from 1972 to 1981; it has since been reissued. The Telecaster Deluxe typically sports a larger, CBS-era Stratocaster-style headstock, maple fretboard, and separate volume and tone controls for each pickup. Early versions featured a Strat-style tremolo, but this was replaced with a hardtail bridge.

=== J5 Telecaster ===
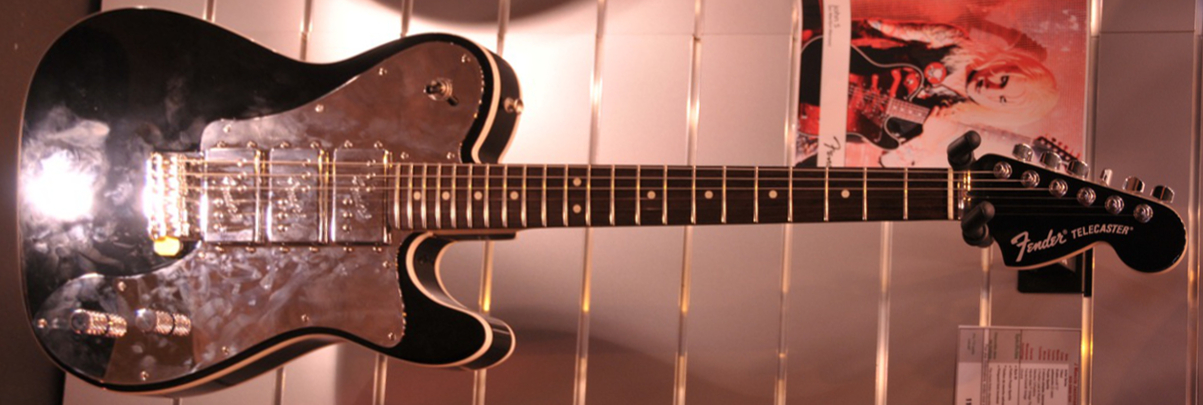

Marilyn Manson and Rob Zombie guitarist John 5 has had several signature models produced by Fender. The J5 Triple Tele Deluxe is similar to the regular Telecaster Deluxe, in that it has 22 frets and a 3 way selector switch for the pickups, but it featured three Fender Wide Range humbuckers and a chrome pickguard.

=== Cabronita ===
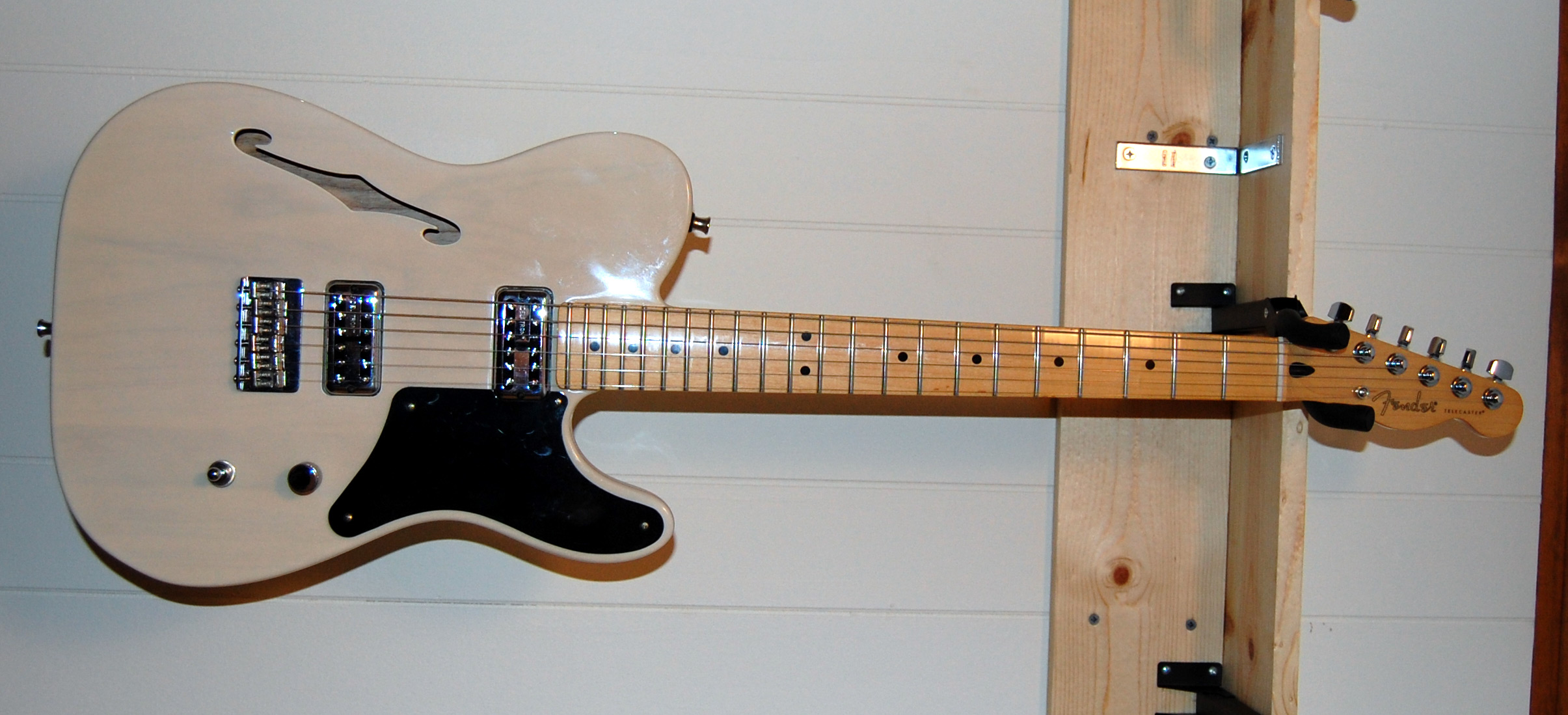

The Cabronita (and Custom Shop variant La Cabronita) is a model that is distinguished by the use of Fidelitron or the more expensive TV Jones Classic humbucking pickups, which look like the original Gretsch humbuckers. The La Cabronita is an American-made, custom-built-to-order instrument. It typically has one TV Jones Classic pickup in the bridge position although being custom built, in can be ordered in any configuration. All Cabronitas can be distinguished by use of a smaller pickguard that covers the lower horn only, similar to the pickguard used in the original prototype for the Telecaster in 1949.

=== Tele Sub-Sonic ===
The sub-sonic Telecaster was first made in 2002 and is still produced. It is made in the US and was produced as a custom guitar. It has a 22 fret maple neck with an extended scale size (27"). It consists of a humbucker in the neck pickup and a slanted single coil in the bridge position. There is a three-way pickup selector switch and a volume and control knob as found on most telecasters.

=== Telecaster XII 12-String ===
This 12-string Telecaster was produced from 1995 until 1998. It has six tuners on each side of the headstock, with the Fender logo in between. Fretboards could be maple or rosewood; the necks are all maple. Pickguards are white or black and the bridge has 12 saddles.

=== B Bender Telecaster ===
This Telecaster was produced from 1996 to 2000. The B-Bender device was used to change the B string's pitch to a C# at the press of a lever located on the guitar strap peg. The styles of music usually utilizing this device were country and country-rock.

=== Jim Root Telecaster ===
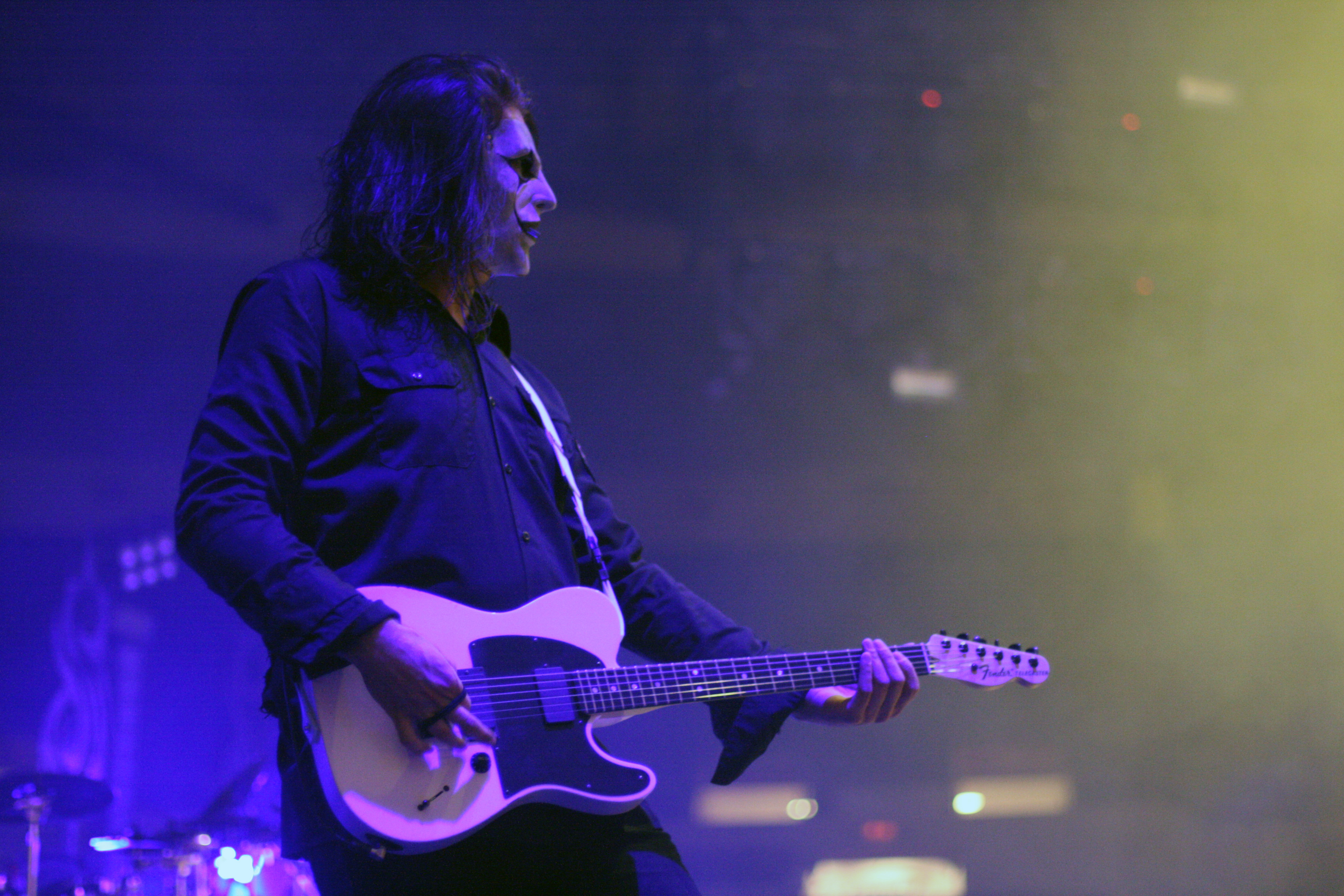

This Telecaster has been produced since 2007. The Jim Root Tele is a signature model designed by Slipknot guitarist Jim Root. It consists of a usually white or black body with all black hardware, ebony fingerboard, dual EMG humbuckers, single master volume control and a hardtail bridge. This guitar is popular amongst Metal and Hardcore guitarists, alongside its Stratocaster counterpart. The blackout effect of the hardware and ebony fingerboard and black hardware, along with it being a Fender Custom Shop base spec, makes it a popular choice for artists looking for a pop of colour on their guitars too, such as Pierce the Veil's Tony Perry, often having Jim Roots finished in neon colours.

== Models ==
In keeping with other models Fender distinguishes product lines manufactured in different locations.

- The moderately-priced Classic Vibe, Standard, Player, Vintera, Vintera II, Classic Player, Blacktop, Modern Player, Deluxe and Player Plus Telecaster models are manufactured in Mexico, Japan, China and Korea. Each of these instruments has a feature set that makes them more affordable.
- The American Professional, Professional II, American Vintage, American Original, American Elite, American Ultra, Select, Artist Series, Custom Shop, Acoustasonic, American Special and American Performer model lines are manufactured in the United States.

The American Deluxe Telecaster (introduced in 1998; upgraded in 2004, 2008, and 2010) features a pair of Samarium Cobalt Noiseless pickups and the S-1 switching system. Models made prior to 2004 featured two Fender Vintage Noiseless Tele single-coils, Fender/Fishman Powerbridge piezo system and four-bolt neck fixing. Other refinements include a bound contoured alder or ash body and an abalone dot-inlaid maple neck with rosewood or maple fingerboard, 22 medium-jumbo frets, rolled fingerboard edges, and highly detailed nut and fret work. The HH model sported an ebony fingerboard, quilted or flamed maple top and a pair of Enforcer humbuckers with S-1 switching (discontinued as of 2008). As of March 23, 2010, Fender updated the American Deluxe Telecaster with a compound radius maple neck, N3 Noiseless Tele pickups and a reconfigured S-1 switching system for wider sonic possibilities. The new model now sports staggered, locking tuning machines, which provide a better break angle over the nut for increased sustain and improved tuning stability. The Thinline version has been introduced in 2013. Fender discontinued the American Deluxe series in 2016.

The American Elite Tele (Introduced in 2016; discontinued in 2019) features an updated set of Noiseless pickups and S-1 switch for series/parallel wiring. The American Elite Tele uses a double action truss rod adjustment wheel located under the last fret instead of the truss rod adjustment on the headstock. Other changes include a new neck heel contour design, 9"-14" compound fretboard radius, and compound neck shape (neck shape changes from C to D from top to bottom). American Elite models made from 2016 to 2018 were offered with maple or rosewood, while from 2018 to 2019, rosewood was replaced with streaked ebony.

The American Ultra Tele (Introduced in 2019) is an update from the previous American Elite model, with updated Noiseless pickups, a new neck heel & cutaway contour design, and new sets of colors available. Other changes include a 10"-14" fretboard radius, a return to the truss rod adjustment on the headstock, and the use of rosewood as fretboard option besides maple, with ebony only available on select limited edition models. In 2021, Fender released the Ultra Luxe Tele which share the same specs as the Ultra, but with stainless steel frets, ash body, and available either with a fixed bridge or Floyd Rose tremolo.

The American Series model used two single-coil pickups with DeltaTone system (featuring a high output bridge pickup and a reverse-wound neck pickup). Other features included a parchment pickguard, non-veneered alder or ash bodies and rolled fingerboard edges.

In 2003 Fender offered Telecasters with a humbucking/single coil pickup arrangement or two humbucking pickups featuring Enforcer humbucking pickups, and S-1 switching. These models were discontinued in 2007. As of 2008, all American Standard Telecasters came with a redesigned Tele bridge with vintage-style bent steel saddles, and a bridgeplate made of chromed brass instead of steel. In March 2012 the American Standard Telecaster was updated with Custom Shop pickups (Broadcaster in the bridge, Twisted in the neck); the body is now contoured for reduced weight and more comfort. In 2014 the American Standard Telecaster HH was introduced, sporting a pair of Twin Head Vintage humbucking pickups (open-coil with black bobbins in the bridge, metal-covered in the neck). Controls include a dual concentric volume pot for each pickup, a master tone and 3-way pickup switching.

The American Nashville B-Bender guitar is modeled after the personally customized instruments of some of Nashville's top players, featuring a Fender/Parsons/Green B-Bender system, two American Tele single-coils (neck, bridge), a Texas Special Strat single-coil (middle) and five-way "Strat-O-Tele" pickup switching. Ideal for country bends and steel guitar glisses, this Tele is available only with a maple fingerboard.

The American Series Ash Telecaster is based on the '52 vintage reissue. It features an ash body, one-piece maple neck/fingerboard with 22 frets and two Modern Vintage Tele single-coil pickups. Fender discontinued this guitar in 2006.

The Custom Classic Telecaster was the Custom Shop version of the American Series Tele, featuring a pair of Classic and Twisted single-coils in the bridge and neck positions, as well as a reverse control plate. Earlier versions made before 2003 featured an American Tele single-coil paired with two Texas Special Strat pickups and 5-way switching. Discontinued in 2009 and replaced by the Custom Deluxe Telecaster series models. The 2011 version of the Custom Shop "Custom Deluxe" Telecaster featured a lightweight Ash body with contoured heel, Birdseye maple neck, and a pickup set that included a Twisted Tele neck pickup and a Seymour Duncan Custom Shop BG-1400 stacked humbucker in the bridge position.

The Highway One Telecaster (introduced in 2000) featured a pair of distortion-friendly alnico III, single-coil pickups, super-sized 22 frets, Greasebucket circuit, satin nitrocellulose finish, and 1970s styling font(since 2006). A change over came in 2005/2006 with the line until 2011. Limited colors from previous years down to at least satin nitrocellulose Crimson Transparent, honey blonde, black, daphne blue and 3-color sunburst. The Fender Highway One series came in both maple and rosewood fretboards. The Highway One Texas Telecaster sported a one-piece maple neck/fretboard with a modern 12" radius and 21 medium jumbo frets, bone nut, single ply pickguard, round string guide, brass saddles, "spaghetti" style Fender font, solid ash body, vintage tuners, offered in two satin nitrocellulose colors, honey blonde and 2-color sunburst with a pair of Hot Vintage alnico V pickups.

In 2010, the American Special Telecaster was introduced. While retaining such features from the Highway One as jumbo frets, changing to a 9.5 radius neck, Greasebucket tone circuit and 1970s logo, the American Special also includes some upgrades such as a glossy urethane finish, compensated brass 3-saddle bridge and Highway One Texas Tele pickups (alnico III). In the Fall of 2013, Fender upgraded the pickups on the American Special line to Custom Shop Texas Special pickups. As of 2018 the American Special Telecaster is available in 3-color sunburst, lake placid blue, sherwood green metallic and vintage blonde.

In 2019, the American Performer Telecaster was introduced as the successor to the American Special. The American Performer retains most of the American Special's features, but with upgrades such as the Fender Yosemite pickups, Classic Gear tuners, and new colors. Also released is the American Performer Tele Hum, which features a Double Tap humbucker on the neck position, and a push-pull pot to split the humbucker to single coil.

Artist Series Telecasters have features favored by world-famous Fender endorsees James Burton, John 5, Muddy Waters, Jim Root, G. E. Smith, Joe Strummer, Jimmy Page, Brent Mason, Brad Paisley and Jim Adkins. Custom Artist models are made at the Fender Custom Shop, differing slightly quality and construction-wise; their prices are much higher than the standard production versions.

In September 2010, Fender introduced the Mexican-made Black Top Telecaster HH, featuring dual hot vintage alnico humbucking pickups, a one-piece maple neck with rosewood or maple fretboard and 22 medium-jumbo frets. Other features include a solid contoured alder body, a reversed control assembly and black skirted amp control knobs.

In 2011, Fender released the Modern Player series, which featured the Modern Player Telecaster Thinline and the Modern Player Telecaster Plus.

The Acoustasonic Telecaster is a combination of an acoustic and electric guitar. First produced in 2010, this 22 fret guitar was then reintroduced in 2019 after some changes were made. They are made in Corona, California and come in 5 colors, (Black, Sonic Gray, Natural, Sunburst, and Surf Green).

The Acoustasonic is equipped with a Fender Acoustasonic Noiseless-TM pickup and uses Fender's Stringed Instrument Resonance System (SIRS) system to allow the guitar to still maintain a loud sound when it is unplugged, as an acoustic guitar would generally sound. The guitars are made out of a spruce top with an ebony fret board and a mahogany neck. The neck is bolt on and the fender logo is engraved on the head-stock next to the staggered-height tuners. There is a 5 way switch to select between sounds and a USB port for charging the electronics in the guitar.

=== Replicated Telecasters ===
A variety of Telecasters have been replicated over the years.

- The '50 Broadcaster, reissued in 2020.
- The '50s American Original Telecaster (2018)
- The American Vintage II '51 Telecaster
- The American Vintage II '63 Telecaster
- The Vintera II 50s Nocaster
- The Vintera II 60s Telecaster
- The Vintera II 70s Telecaster Deluxe
- The '52 Telecaster, which was made in 1982–1984 and then 1986 to 2018.
- The '52 Tele Special made from 1999 to 2001, which had gold fixtures.
- The 50s Telecaster, a custom shop guitar that was made from 1996 to 1998.
- The 60s Telecaster Custom was made from 1996 to 1998; in addition, a '60 Telecaster Custom replica was made from 2003 to 2004.
- The '62 Telecaster Custom is still currently made, with production starting in 1999.
- The '63 Telecaster is a custom shop guitar produced from 1999 to the present day.
- The '67 Telecaster made from 2004 to the present day and is a custom shop guitar.

=== Squier models ===
Squier model Telecasters are sold by Squier, a Fender-owned import brand. These can bear the Telecaster name, since Squier is owned by Fender. Squier guitars, especially the Telecasters, have gained popularity and a good reputation among guitar players.

== Significance ==
The Telecaster was important in the evolution of country, electric blues, funk, rock and roll, and other forms of popular music. Its solid construction let guitarists play loudly as a lead instrument, with long sustain if desired. It produced less of the uncontrolled, whistling, 'hard' feedback ('microphonic feedback') that hollowbodied instruments tend to produce at volume (different from the controllable feedback later explored by Pete Townshend and countless other players). Even though the Telecaster is almost three quarters of a century old, and more sophisticated designs have appeared since the early 1950s (including Fender's own Stratocaster), the Telecaster remains in production. There have been numerous variations and modifications, but a model with something close to the original features has always been available.
