= The Original Singles: 1967–1969, Volume 2 =

The Original Singles: 1967-1969, Volume 2

Compilation album by the Byrds
- Released: 1982
- Recorded: 1966–1968
- Genre: Rock
- Length: 45:15
- Label: CBS
- Producer: Gary Usher, Bob Johnston

The Byrds chronology
The Original Singles: 1965-1967, Volume 1 (1980)	The Original Singles: 1967-1969, Volume 2 (1982)	The Very Best of The Byrds (1983)

The Original Singles: 1967–1969, Volume 2 is a compilation album by American rock band the Byrds.

== Release ==
Originally released in 1982, the album was a follow-up to The Original Singles: 1965-1967, Volume 1 and compiled all of the mono single versions of songs that the Byrds' had released on 7" between early 1967 and early 1969 for the first time. The tracks on the album are all laid out chronologically by release date, featuring the A-side first and then the B-side. For example, the album opens with the single version of "My Back Pages" and follows it up with "Renaissance Fair", which was the B-side.

The album was released on LP and tape cassette and has never been issued on CD. Due to the commercial failure of The Original Singles: 1965-1967, Volume 1 in the U.S., Volume 2 was only issued in Europe. Nevertheless, the track listing follows the Byrds' North American A and B side release order (singles released outside the U.S. sometimes featured different songs).

The Byrds' biographer Johnny Rogan has stated that CBS Records asked him to compile a third volume of Byrds' singles for the UK market, but as Rogan recalled, "I told them they were scraping the barrel, not least because there were not enough singles to make up a full 16-track compilation".

== Track listing ==
All tracks are in mono except for "I Am A Pilgrim" and "Pretty Boy Floyd" which are in stereo. They were all previously released on 45 RPM singles and most of them were also released on the Byrds' LPs Younger Than Yesterday, The Notorious Byrd Brothers, Sweetheart of the Rodeo and Dr. Byrds & Mr. Hyde.

=== Side 1 ===
1. "My Back Pages" (Bob Dylan) - 2:35
2. "Renaissance Fair" (David Crosby, Roger McGuinn) - 1:54
3. "Have You Seen Her Face" (Chris Hillman) - 2:33
4. "Don't Make Waves" (Roger McGuinn, Chris Hillman) - 1:36
5. "Lady Friend" (David Crosby) - 2:36
6. "Old John Robertson" (Chris Hillman, Roger McGuinn) - 1:53
7. "Goin' Back" (Carole King, Gerry Goffin) - 3:27
8. "Change Is Now" (Chris Hillman, Roger McGuinn) - 3:24

=== Side 2 ===
1. "You Ain't Goin' Nowhere" (Bob Dylan) - 2:50
2. "Artificial Energy" (Roger McGuinn, Chris Hillman, Michael Clarke) - 2:21
3. "I Am a Pilgrim" (traditional, arranged Roger McGuinn, Chris Hillman) - 3:41
4. "Pretty Boy Floyd" (Woody Guthrie) - 2:36
5. "Bad Night at the Whiskey" (Roger McGuinn, Joseph Richards) - 3:24
6. "Drug Store Truck Drivin' Man" (Roger McGuinn, Gram Parsons) - 3:44
7. "Lay Lady Lay" (Bob Dylan) - 3:19
8. "Old Blue" (traditional, arranged Roger McGuinn) - 3:22

=== Track notes ===
- The mono mix of "Don't Make Waves" made its first album appearance on this compilation, although it can now also be found on the Sundazed compilation The Columbia Singles '65-'67 and on the Japanese Original Singles A's & B's 1965-1971 compilation. In addition, a stereo remix of the song is available as a bonus track on the 1996 CD re-issue of Younger Than Yesterday.
- "Lady Friend" was only released as a single and was never included on any Byrds studio album.
- The single version of "Old John Robertson" is an entirely different mix to the one found on The Notorious Byrd Brothers album.
- The mono single mix of "You Ain't Goin' Nowhere" was never released on a Byrds studio album, since its parent album, Sweetheart of the Rodeo, was the first Byrds' album to be mixed exclusively in stereo. The album was issued in a mono variation in the UK, but all eleven album tracks are stereo-to-mono fold-down mixes. This means that "You Ain't Going Nowhere" on the UK mono version of Sweetheart is a fold-down of the stereo mix instead of the unique mono mix found on the single.
- "Lay Lady Lay" was only released as a single and never appeared on a Byrds studio album.
