= The Best of Grace Slick =

Compilation album by Grace Slick
- Released: 1999
- Genre: Rock; psychedelic rock
- Label: RCA
- Producer: Paul Williams

Grace Slick chronology
Software (1984)	The Best of Grace Slick (1999)

The Best of Grace Slick is a 1999 compilation album of Grace Slick's work, focusing mostly on work with Jefferson Airplane, Jefferson Starship and Starship. There are three tracks from her solo albums, although none appear from Dreams (1980).

The album includes a previously unreleased bonus track that was recorded during Starship's Knee Deep in the Hoopla sessions called "Do You Remember Me?".

It was rated three stars by AllMusic.

== Track listing ==
All tracks are written by Grace Slick, unless otherwise stated.

No.	Title	Writer(s)	Length
1.	"Somebody to Love" (from Surrealistic Pillow)	Darby Slick	2:59
2.	"White Rabbit" (from Surrealistic Pillow)		2:34
3.	"Rejoyce" (from After Bathing at Baxter's)		4:03
4.	"Lather" (from Crown of Creation)		2:58
5.	"Triad" (from Crown of Creation)	David Crosby	4:52
6.	"Eskimo Blue Day" (from Volunteers)	G. Slick, Paul Kantner	6:34
7.	"Sunrise" (from Blows Against the Empire)		1:56
8.	"Mexico" (from Early Flight)		2:07
9.	"Law Man" (from Bark)		2:42
10.	"Across the Board" (from Baron von Tollbooth & the Chrome Nun)		4:36
11.	"Better Lying Down" (from Manhole)	G. Slick, Pete Sears	3:14
12.	"Hyperdrive" (from Dragon Fly)	G. Slick, Sears	7:43
13.	"Fast Buck Freddie" (from Red Octopus)	G. Slick, Craig Chaquico	3:30
14.	"All the Machines" (from Software)	G. Slick, Peter Wolf	4:50
15.	"Wrecking Ball" (from Welcome to the Wrecking Ball!)	G. Slick, Scott Zito	3:52
16.	"We Built This City" (from Knee Deep in the Hoopla)	Bernie Taupin, Martin Page, Dennis Lambert, Wolf	4:55
17.	"Do You Remember Me?" (previously unreleased)		3:56
18.	"Nothing's Gonna Stop Us Now" (from No Protection)	Albert Hammond, Diane Warren	4:27
