= Old John Robertson =

- 1967 Danish picture sleeve.

Single by the Byrds

from the album The Notorious Byrd Brothers
- A-side: "Lady Friend"
- Released: July 13, 1967
- Recorded: June 21, 1967
- Studio: Columbia, Hollywood, California
- Genre: Rock; country rock
- Length: 1:49
- Label: Columbia
- Songwriter(s): Chris Hillman, Roger McGuinn
- Producer(s): Gary Usher

The Byrds singles chronology
"Have You Seen Her Face" (1967)	"Lady Friend" / "Old John Robertson" (1967)	"Goin' Back" (1967)

"Old John Robertson" is a song by the American rock band the Byrds, written by band members Chris Hillman and Roger McGuinn, and first released in July 1967, as the B-side to the non-album single "Lady Friend". It was also later included on the band's 1968 album, The Notorious Byrd Brothers. The version of "Old John Robertson" featured on the single is a substantially different mix from the version that appeared on The Notorious Byrd Brothers.

== Writing and recording ==
The song was inspired by the retired film director John S. Robertson who lived in the small town near San Diego where the Byrds' bassist Chris Hillman grew up. Robertson was an aberrant figure around the rural area, frequently being seen wearing a Stetson hat, and sporting a white handlebar mustache, which gave him the appearance of an American frontiersman out of the Wild West. In the song's lyrics, Hillman recalls how the town's children cruelly laughed at Robertson's appearance, and the combination of shock and awe that he provoked in the townspeople.

Hillman attempted to capture the visual eccentricity of Robertson by having the band record the song as a country-western two-step. On the album version of the song, an unnamed session musician underscores the visual representation by playing a fiddle, mixed deep within the track. Writer Ric Menck has speculated that the fiddle player is Byron Berline, who had recently moved to Los Angeles and mingled with the Byrds' crowd, as well as appearing on various other country rock albums of the period. The country-tinged nature of "Old John Robertson", like a handful of other Byrds' songs from the period, foresaw the Byrds' later experimentation with country rock.

During the recording of the song, Hillman switched instruments with band member David Crosby to play rhythm guitar, instead of his usual bass. In press conferences, Hillman explained that he was beginning to improve upon his guitar playing, and since he wrote "Old John Robertson" with the instrument, he wanted to carry it over to the recording, even though Crosby had not played bass since the early days of the group.

The album version of the song makes broad use of the audio effects known as phasing and flanging, particularly during the orchestral middle section and third verse.

== Release ==
The single version of "Old John Robertson", without the fiddle playing and phasing effects, was issued on the B-side of the Byrds' "Lady Friend" single in the United States on July 13, 1967. It was also released in this way in mainland Europe, but in the United Kingdom the B-side of "Lady Friend" was switched to "Don't Make Waves", another Hillman and McGuinn penned song. The album version of the song appeared in January 1968, on the band's The Notorious Byrd Brothers album.

The single mix was first issued on an album in 1982, with the release of the compilation The Original Singles: 1967–1969, Volume 2. This version of the song was also added as a bonus track to the 1996 Columbia/Legacy reissue of the album Younger Than Yesterday. Additionally, "Old John Robertson" appears on several other Byrds compilations, including History of The Byrds, Nashville West, The Essential Byrds, and There Is a Season.
