= Never Before (The Byrds album) =

Compilation album by the Byrds
- Released: December 1, 1987
- Recorded: January 20, 1965 – November 13, 1967, Columbia Studios and RCA Studios, Hollywood, CA
- Genres: Rock, pop, folk rock, psychedelic rock, raga rock
- Length: 27:59
- Labels: Re-Flyte, Murray Hill
- Producers: Jim Dickson, Terry Melcher, Allen Stanton, Gary Usher, The Byrds

The Byrds chronology
The Byrds Collection (1986)	Never Before (1987)	In the Beginning (1988)

Never Before is a compilation album by the American rock band the Byrds, consisting of previously unreleased outtakes, alternate versions, and rarities. It was initially released by Re-Flyte Records in December 1987 and was subsequently reissued on CD in 1989, with an additional seven bonus tracks.

Never Before consists of material recorded between 1965 and 1967 by the original line-up of the Byrds, featuring Roger McGuinn, Gene Clark, David Crosby, Chris Hillman, and Michael Clarke (although Gene Clark had left the group by early 1966). The songs on the album were all originally recorded for Columbia Records during the sessions for the band's first five studio albums: Mr. Tambourine Man, Turn! Turn! Turn!, Fifth Dimension, Younger Than Yesterday, and The Notorious Byrd Brothers. The album represented the first time that previously unreleased outtakes from the Byrds' tenure with Columbia Records had been officially released.

== Conception and production ==
The album's genesis can be traced back to the early 1980s, when folk singer Tom Slocum – a friend of former Byrd Gene Clark – stumbled across a cache of forgotten Byrds' recordings in the tape library at Wally Heider Studios in Los Angeles. According to Slocum, these tapes included early versions of "Eight Miles High" and "Why" that had been recorded at RCA Studios in late 1965, along with the outtakes "Triad" and "The Day Walk (Never Before)". Slocum immediately notified the Byrds' former manager, Jim Dickson, of his discovery and before long, Dickson had involved Bob Hyde of Murray Hill Records, with an eye to producing an archival compilation album.

Although the Byrds had disbanded in 1973, Hyde felt sure that there was a market for a collection like Never Before, due to the renewed interest in the band that had been generated by their influence on the likes of R.E.M., the Smiths, and the Bangles during the 1980s. Hyde retained Dickson's help in the project as a way of ensuring that the album would have the blessing of the ex-members of the Byrds and, in some cases, their active participation in enhancing the material.

Following the initial discovery at Wally Heider Studios, a thorough search of the Columbia Records' tape vaults ensued and additional unreleased material dating from the mid-1960s was unearthed. Dickson and Hyde then set about compiling a ten track running order comprising the best of the available tapes. Dickson also elected to remix the chosen songs with the help of Lawrence Wendelken, in an attempt to improve the fidelity of the recordings.

Two of Crosby's compositions on the album benefitted from the addition of newly recorded overdubs, performed by ex-members of the Byrds, in an attempt to polish the material further. "It Happens Each Day", an outtake from the Younger Than Yesterday sessions, had been abandoned in an incomplete state during the 1960s and, as a result, it required further instrumental embellishment to prepare it for release. The new enhancements to "It Happens Each Day" included an acoustic guitar solo, played by the band's bassist, Chris Hillman. Crosby's controversial ode to a potential ménage à trois, "Triad", also required additional work, after a problem with the lead vocal track was discovered. The problem was solved by having Crosby re-sing one line, although according to Dickson, the substitution was so precise that it is virtually undetectable.

== Music ==
Among the wealth of previously unreleased material included on the album, two songs came from the pen of Gene Clark. Of these, "She Has a Way" was an outtake from the Mr. Tambourine Man sessions that had previously appeared in demo form on the Preflyte album, while "Never Before" was a Dylanesque song that had been discarded during the recording of the band's second album. The title of this latter song was coined by Clark in 1987, due to his inability to recall its original title. Ultimately, the song provided the album with its name, but in the years following the release of Never Before, studio documentation was discovered that revealed that the song's original title had, in fact, been "The Day Walk". As a result, all subsequent appearances of the song on Byrds' compilation albums have borne the title "The Day Walk (Never Before)".

Early versions of "Eight Miles High" and "Why" also made their debut on the album. These two tracks had both been recorded at RCA Studios in Los Angeles on December 22, 1965, for release as part of the Byrds' third album. However, the band ran into trouble with Columbia Records, who refused to release the recordings, due to them having been produced at another company's studios. As a result, the band were forced to re-record both songs at Columbia Studios in Los Angeles on January 24 and 25, 1966, and it was these re-recorded versions that were released as a single and, in the case of "Eight Miles High", included on the Fifth Dimension album. In later years, both McGuinn and Crosby expressed a preference towards the original RCA version of "Eight Miles High" over the more famous Columbia recording, with both band members feeling that it was more spontaneous sounding.

The album also included what critic Richie Unterberger has called "a rough but endearing" cover of Bob Dylan's "It's All Over Now, Baby Blue", which had initially been recorded as a potential third single for the band, during sessions for the Turn! Turn! Turn! album.

As well as featuring previously unreleased material, Never Before also included some of the band's more familiar songs presented in newly prepared stereo mixes. The band's debut single, "Mr. Tambourine Man", and its B-side, "I Knew I'd Want You", both received a new stereo remix, as did Crosby's song, "Lady Friend". This latter track also received newly overdubbed drums, performed by Stan Lynch of Tom Petty and the Heartbreakers. "Lady Friend" had only ever been released in mono and both Hyde and Dickson wanted to take the opportunity to issue the song in stereo for the first time on Never Before. However, Michael Clarke's drumming on the track was not deemed strong enough to stand being exposed by the new stereo mix, hence the need for a more powerful drum sound. This newly overdubbed drum part proved to be controversial among fans of the band, with many feeling that the addition of modern sounding drums (by 1980's standards) was completely inappropriate and incongruous to the mid-60s recording. As a result, this doctored version of "Lady Friend" has not been included on any subsequent release by the Byrds and remains unique to Never Before.

== Release ==
Never Before was released on December 1, 1987, by Re-Flyte Records (a specially created imprint of Murray Hill) as a vinyl LP and a cassette tape. Upon release it was generally well received, garnering far more attention in the music press than contemporary solo releases by the individual ex-members of the Byrds. The album was reissued on CD by Murray Hill on May 1, 1989, with the addition of seven bonus tracks dating from the same 1965–1967 period. Like the original album, the bonus tracks were all newly remixed, but this time the remixing was undertaken by Ken Robertson and the band's lead guitarist Roger McGuinn, rather than Dickson and Wendelken. Included among the bonus tracks were the previously unreleased outtakes "I Know My Rider (I Know You Rider)", "Psychodrama City", "Flight 713", and "Moog Raga". In addition, new stereo remixes of the B-sides "Why", "She Don't Care About Time", and "Don't Make Waves" were included. Two Chris Hillman penned songs were dropped from the track listing of the expanded CD reissue just prior to its release. The first of these was a new stereo remix of "Have You Seen Her Face", which appeared on The Byrds box set in 1990, and the second was a version of "Old John Robertson" featuring newly recorded mandolin overdubs. As of 2026, this augmented version of "Old John Robertson" remains unreleased.

In the years since it was issued, many of the tracks that first appeared on Never Before have been included on subsequent Byrds' releases, most notably on the expanded Columbia/Legacy album reissues and the box sets The Byrds and There Is a Season. Two tracks that have not appeared on any other release, however, are the stereo remix of "Lady Friend", featuring newly recorded drumming, and The Notorious Byrd Brothers outtake, "Flight 713". Never Before is currently out of print, but remains sought after by Byrds collectors due to the presence of these two tracks.

== Track listing ==
=== Side 1 ===
1. "Mr. Tambourine Man" [previously unreleased stereo mix] (Bob Dylan) – 2:19
2. "I Knew I'd Want You" [new stereo mix] (Gene Clark) – 2:18
3. "She Has a Way" [previously unreleased] (Gene Clark) – 2:32
4. "It's All Over Now, Baby Blue" [previously unreleased] (Bob Dylan) – 2:59
5. "Never Before" [previously unreleased] (Gene Clark) – 3:03

=== Side 2 ===
1. "Eight Miles High" [previously unreleased alternate take] (Gene Clark, Roger McGuinn, David Crosby) – 3:22
2. "Why" [previously unreleased alternate take] (Roger McGuinn, David Crosby) – 2:43
3. "Triad" [previously unreleased] (David Crosby) – 3:32
4. "It Happens Each Day" [previously unreleased] (David Crosby) – 2:37
5. "Lady Friend" [new stereo mix] (David Crosby) – 2:33

=== 1989 CD reissue bonus tracks ===
1. "I Know My Rider (I Know You Rider)" [previously unreleased] (traditional, arranged Roger McGuinn, Gene Clark, David Crosby) – 2:49
2. "Why" (Single Version) [previously unreleased stereo mix] (Roger McGuinn, David Crosby) – 3:03
3. "She Don't Care About Time" [previously unreleased stereo mix] (Gene Clark) – 2:31
4. "Flight 713" (Instrumental) [previously unreleased] (Roger McGuinn, Chris Hillman) – 2:36
5. "Psychodrama City" [previously unreleased] (David Crosby) – 2:22
6. "Don't Make Waves" (Single Version) [previously unreleased stereo mix] (Roger McGuinn, Chris Hillman) – 1:37
7. "Moog Raga" (Instrumental) [previously unreleased] (Roger McGuinn) – 2:55

== Personnel ==
NOTE: Sources for this section are as follows: Younger Than Yesterday (1996 CD liner notes), Mr. Tambourine Man (1996 CD liner notes), So You Want To Be A Rock 'n' Roll Star: The Byrds Day-By-Day (1965-1973) by Christopher Hjort, and the Hugh Masekela Discography at dougpayne.com.

The Byrds

- Roger McGuinn - lead guitar, Moog synthesizer, vocals
- Gene Clark - tambourine, vocals
- David Crosby - rhythm guitar, vocals
- Chris Hillman - electric bass, acoustic guitar, vocals
- Michael Clarke - drums

Additional personnel

- Jerry Cole - rhythm guitar (tracks 1–2)
- Larry Knechtel - electric bass (tracks 1–2)
- Leon Russell - electric piano (tracks 1–2)
- Hal Blaine - drums (tracks 1, 2, 14)
- Hugh Masekela – trumpet (track 10)
- Stan Lynch - drums (track 10)
