= Guerrilla gig =

Musical performance

A guerrilla gig is a type of concert performed in a non-traditional setting or arranged in an unusual fashion. It became associated with punk rock, and noise rock bands in the UK and the United States during the early to mid-2000s. Bands that perform at such events are sometimes referred to as "guerrilla rockers".

There are two major elements that characterise a guerrilla gig. The first is similar in concept to a flash mob, and involves a band or artist performing in an unexpected, sometimes unannounced setting, not designed to accommodate live music i.e a bus or subway train, parking lot, or building lobby. The second characteristic involves their being arranged very quickly and without the typical processes of publicity or advance ticket sales. They are usually announced through various internet message boards as well as by text messages and sometimes last-minute flyers.

It is often viewed as an example of punk rock's idealistic "do it yourself" philosophy (which aimed to achieve underground artistic success without commercialisation by avoiding mainstream corporate record labels) being applied via modern communications technology, in a way which would not have been possible before the advent of the internet. The popularity of online forums and social-networking sites has made it possible for bands to immediately disseminate news of a gig to thousands of people only hours before a performance, at minimal cost, and bypassing the traditional print and radio-based methods of publicising concerts.

== Examples ==
One of the earliest known example of a guerrilla gig was in November 1968 when Jefferson Airplane, by the suggestion of Swiss-French filmmaker Jean-Luc Godard, began work on a political semi-documentary he called One A.M. (One American Movie). Godard, who felt that Jefferson Airplane best represented the youth revolution of the day, wanted the band in his film while keeping to a somewhat militant spirit. Godard had the musicians set up their equipment, sans permit, on a hotel rooftop in midtown Manhattan at the peak of the working day. Harried New Yorkers below scanned the sky above the hotel and were able to hear Jefferson Airplane complete one song, an incendiary version of "The House at Pooneil Corners". The performance culminated with the New York City Police shutting down the unexpected performance with threats of arrest due to the noise disturbance. The Godard film was never released, but documentarian D. A. Pennebaker finished it up and renamed it One P.M. (for One Pennebaker Movie). A recount of this performance can be seen on the "Fly Jefferson Airplane" documentary DVD released in 2004.

This Jefferson Airplane performance predates the similar although more well-known performance when The Beatles, on January 30, 1969, played a gig entirely unannounced on the roof of Apple Studios at 3 Savile Row, London. They performed several takes of their newest songs (which would appear on the album Let It Be) as the passers-by on the street looked up in confusion. After the third take of "Get Back", they too were shut down by the police due to noise complaints.

== Development in Britain ==
A few British bands became known for "guerrilla gigging" in the early 2000s. The technique first developed there because the concentrated social and geographical nature of the London music scene made it possible to generate a favourable "buzz" and ensure attendance at the events. The Libertines were among the first to use internet technology to accomplish this, often announcing a gig a few hours before the show by providing cryptic instructions for fans to meet at a given place to await an escort to a flat, where the admission price would be collected and the concert would take place in a living room or basement. The Others provide another example, having performed brief shows in tube trains (subways) on the London Underground for mixed groups of fans and startled passengers. In another famous instance, singer Badly Drawn Boy earned £1.60 from passersby while busking outside London's Waterloo station for a day in 2003, going largely unrecognized by the public. It is important to differentiate busking to Guerrilla Gigging, however for a predominantly acoustic artist such as Badly Drawn Boy the line between the two performance methods can become blurred.

== United States ==
Rhode Island noise rock bands such as Lightning Bolt, and Athens GA indie-punk band Nana Grizol as well as other American bands, have embraced this new extreme DIY culture. Many bands have embraced this by going down the streets on wagon hitches such as the Dropkick Murphys and AC/DC. In the mid-to-late 80's Rodent Kontrol, a punk band from Ann Arbor, Michigan, gained local notoriety for their guerrilla gigs in and around downtown Ann Arbor and on the University of Michigan campus. Some of these shows terminated in the band's ejection from the unauthorized venues by police or security guards.

Irish rock group U2 famously recorded the music video for "Where The Streets Have No Name" on the roof of one-storey building in downtown Los Angeles. They performed other songs to the large crowd that had spilled onto the streets of Los Angeles and attracted media and police attention, which caused the shutdown. Home video footage of the gig exists on the internet.

Detroit duo The White Stripes also did many guerrilla performances during their Canadian tour in 2007, such as in bowling pub, a bus, one note show and so on. At the evening, they played a full show. This tour is documented in Under Great White Northern Lights.

In September 2019, Detroit Hardcore Punk band, Strange Magic, played a Guerrilla gig out of the back of a U-Haul box truck in Detroit's Eastern Market district. The show grew a large crowd, which started with their fans and eventually caught the attention of civilians passing by. The show was well-documented by local videographers, leading to plenty of footage circulating on the internet.

== See also ==
- Guerrilla punk
- DIY ethic
- Punk ideology
- Basement show
