= Goin' Back =

1966 single by Dusty Springfield

Single by Dusty Springfield
- B-side: "I'm Gonna Leave You"
- Released: July 1, 1966
- Recorded: June 15, 1966
- Studio: Philips (London)
- Genre: Pop
- Label: Philips
- Songwriters: Gerry Goffin, Carole King
- Producer: Johnny Franz

Dusty Springfield singles chronology
"You Don't Have to Say You Love Me" (1966)	"Goin' Back" (1966)	"All I See Is You" (1966)

"Goin' Back" (also recorded and released as "Going Back") is a song written by Gerry Goffin and Carole King in 1966. It describes the loss of innocence that comes with adulthood, along with an attempt, on the part of the singer, to recapture that youthful innocence.

The song, as recorded that year by Dusty Springfield, was a top ten hit on the UK Singles Chart. It was recorded and released as a single the following year by the Byrds; it was included on their album The Notorious Byrd Brothers and subsequently on many Byrds compilation albums as well. A critically lauded interpretation was recorded by Nils Lofgren at the start of his solo career in 1975 and has been a mainstay of his concert performances since. The song has also been recorded by many other artists, including Marianne Faithfull, the New Seekers, the Pretenders, Diana Ross, Richard Thompson, Phil Collins and Black Oak Arkansas, as well as by Carole King herself.

== Dusty Springfield's version ==
Although Goldie (of Goldie & the Gingerbreads) was the first artist to record the song, her version was withdrawn following disagreements with Goffin and King over the song's lyrics. Carole King then decided to record "Goin' Back" herself, but ultimately she offered it to Dusty Springfield instead. Springfield went on to have an international hit with the song and it is considered one of the best known versions.

Springfield's version of "Goin' Back" was recorded on June 15, 1966 at Philips Studios, Stanhope Place, London, with musical accompaniment by Peter Knight and production by Johnny Franz. It was released as a single on July 1, 1966, reaching number 10 in the UK Singles Chart, but was not released as a single in the U.S.

Although "Goin' Back" was not included on any of Dusty Springfield's studio albums during the 1960s, it can be found on a number of her compilations, including Greatest Hits, Goin' Back: The Very Best of Dusty Springfield, Songbooks, Complete A and B-sides: 1963–1970, Live at the BBC, and the UK version of Golden Hits.

=== Chart history (Dusty Springfield) ===
Chart (1966)	Peak position
Australia (Billboard Hits of the World)	9
New Zealand (Listener)	15
Singapore Singles Chart	6
UK Singles Chart	10

== The Byrds' version ==
"Goin' Back"
- 1967 Dutch picture sleeve

Single by the Byrds

from the album The Notorious Byrd Brothers
- B-side: "Change Is Now"
- Released: October 20, 1967
- Recorded: October 9, 11 and 16, 1967
- Studio: Columbia, Hollywood
- Genre: Baroque pop, country rock
- Length: 3:26
- Label: Columbia
- Songwriters: Gerry Goffin, Carole King
- Producer: Gary Usher

The Byrds singles chronology
"Lady Friend" (1967)	"Goin' Back" (1967)	"You Ain't Goin' Nowhere" (1968)

Audio sample
- "Goin' Back": file; help

The Byrds' recording of "Goin' Back" was released as a single on October 20, 1967 and reached number 89 on the Billboard Hot 100, but failed to chart in the United Kingdom. The song was also included on the Byrds' 1968 album, The Notorious Byrd Brothers. The track has a subtle country feel to it; a sound the Byrds would later explore more prominently on their Sweetheart of the Rodeo album.

The band's decision to record "Goin' Back" led to tensions within the group, principally due to rhythm guitarist David Crosby's lack of enthusiasm towards the song. Crosby considered "Goin' Back" to be lightweight fluff, typical of the Brill Building style of songwriting. He was therefore dismayed to find that his own song, "Triad", was in direct competition with "Goin' Back" for a place on The Notorious Byrd Brothers. Ultimately, Crosby was fired from the band and "Goin' Back" was included on the album and released as a single.

Cash Box said of the single that it is "soft, slow blues ballad material with combined folk and electronic frosting" with "sweet harmony into the vocal end and serves up the usual grade-A guitar sound."

It has been erroneously claimed by some critics that the version of "Goin' Back" found on the Byrds' single release is a completely different take to the one that appeared on The Notorious Byrd Brothers album. However, an examination of the Byrds' recording session logs by Johnny Rogan reveals that, in fact, the single version is the same take as the version found on the album. The single version does feature a slightly different mono mix, which may have been the cause of this confusion.

In addition to the original release, the mono single mix of "Goin' Back" has appeared on the 1982 compilation album The Original Singles: 1967–1969, Volume 2, the 2002 compilation LP The Columbia Singles '65-'67, and the 2012 Japanese CD Original Singles A's & B's 1965–1971.

In addition to its appearance on The Notorious Byrd Brothers album, the Byrds' recording of "Goin' Back" can be found on several Byrds' compilations, including The Byrds' Greatest Hits Volume II, History of The Byrds, The Original Singles: 1967–1969, Volume 2, The Byrds, The Very Best of The Byrds, There Is a Season, and the UK version of The Best of The Byrds: Greatest Hits, Volume II. Additionally, an early, alternate version of "Goin' Back" was included as a bonus track on the 1997 Columbia/Legacy reissue of The Notorious Byrd Brothers.

== Nils Lofgren's version ==
A recording of "Goin' Back" was the closing track on Nils Lofgren's 1975 debut solo album Nils Lofgren. While the album did not produce any hit singles, selections from it did receive substantial airplay on progressive rock and album-oriented rock radio formats. Lofgren's arrangement was diverged significantly from that of The Byrds, the one American audiences were most familiar with. In particular, the tempo and overall attitude was more freewheeling and upbeat. A review for The Sacramento Bee said that "Carole King's 'Goin' Back' never sounded better". Although Lofgren was known primarily as a guitarist, he was also quite capable on keyboard-based instruments; as The Rough Guide to Rock wrote, Lofgren "showed his versatility with some fine piano work on a version of Carole King's 'Goin' Back.'"

Lofgren continued to play piano during concert performances of "Goin' Back". Reviewers often noted that the song was a highlight of Lofgren's shows. One concert review characterized it as "a gentle, but stirring and determined song about recapturing better times and renewing direction." Performances sometimes included Lofgren working in a bit of "Mary Had a Little Lamb" during the piano part that started the song. Lofgren's "official bootleg" live album Back It Up!! was put out in 1975. The album was only made available to radio stations and some in the music press, but "Goin' Back" was included on it, with Lofgren saying during the opening, "I'd like to thank Carole King for this next tune." AllMusic would term this version "stunning". Influential rock radio station WMMS in Cleveland, Ohio began playing this live "Goin' Back" frequently, and from there other progressive and album rock stations around the United States started playing it as well. A different performance of the song was included on the regularly released 1977 live album Night After Night, where a reviewer commented on Lofgren's "lively piano licks" during it.

As a retrospective review, the New Rolling Stone Record Guide (1983), which gave Nils Lofgren a five-star rating, writes that "the highlight of the album was probably the album-closing 'Goin' Back.' Lofgren's rendition may be the best the song ever received because his persona was so perfectly summed up in the song's wistful celebration of joyous innocence." In a 2010 volume, author Remy Miller makes a similar observation, saying that Lofgren's exuberance and high-pitched voice convey an image of youth but additionally positing that the introspective nature of the song is materially different from the other tracks on the album and is an example of using other artists' material to help give a collection a greater sense of balance.

Over the years it has become known as one of Lofgren's best interpretations of others' material. A recap of Lofgren's career in the Fort Worth Star-Telegram called his "Goin' Back" a "tremendous" rendition that helped launch his solo career. On the other hand, a Boston Globe review of a Lofgren concert in 1982 viewed a performance of that song in that show as a possible metacommentary on Lofgren's career itself, given that Lofgren's career which had seemed so promising in 1975 had not quite worked out. In any case, over the years the song has been included on a number of Lofgren compilation albums. Continuing into the 2000s, press material and advertisements for Lofgren concert appearances listed "Goin' Back" as one of the three or four songs to identify him by.

== Other versions ==
Carole King released her own recording of "Goin' Back" on her 1970 album Writer, and later re-recorded the song for her Pearls: Songs of Goffin and King album in 1980.

The New Seekers recorded and released a folk rock version of "Goin' Back" as part of their 1973 album Now. The track featured band member Peter Doyle as the lead vocalist on this, his last album with the group.

"Goin' Back" was recorded by Freddie Mercury in 1973 and released under the pseudonym of Larry Lurex on the B-side of a single that also featured fellow Queen bandmates Brian May and Roger Taylor on guitar and drums respectively.

Bruce Springsteen released a live version with the E Street Band as part of an official archival recording in 2018, The Roxy 1975, documenting the early show on October 18, 1975 at the Roxy Theatre in Los Angeles. Springsteen has only publicly performed the song a known total of six times – at every show of his four-night residency at the 500-seat West Hollywood venue. This was his and the band's first headlining showcase in California, just as his album Born to Run was about to make him a star. He mentioned its composer, Carole King, when he debuted the song Oct. 16, while she was in the audience.

"Goin' Back" was also recorded by Elkie Brooks for her 1982 album Pearls II, and by Diana Ross in a version on her Love & Life: The Very Best of Diana Ross album in 2001.

In 1983, Renée Geyer and Glenn Shorrock released a live version as a single from Geyer's live album, Renée Live. The song peaked at number 65 on the Australian Kent Music Report.

In 2011, Irish footballer Paul McGrath covered "Goin' Back" as part of an album of cover versions, with a percentage of the album's proceeds going to the Acquired Brain Injury Foundation and the Cystic Fibrosis Foundation of Ireland.

"Goin' Back" has also been recorded by Eydie Gormé (album: It Was a Good Time, 1971), Johnny Logan (album: Straight From the Heart, 1985), Marianne Faithfull (album: Horses and High Heels, 2011), Phil Collins in 2010 (Going Back, where it served as the title track) and by Black Oak Arkansas (album: The Devil’s Jukebox, 2023).
