= Software (album) =

1984 studio album by Grace Slick

Studio album by Grace Slick
- Released: 1984
- Recorded: 1983
- Studios: The Plant, Sausalito
- Genres: Electropop; synth-pop; new wave
- Length: 37:04
- Label: RCA
- Producer: Ron Nevison

Grace Slick chronology
Welcome to the Wrecking Ball! (1981)	Software (1984)	The Best of Grace Slick (1999)

Singles from Software
- 1. "All the Machines" Released: January 9, 1984; 2. "Through the Window" Released: June 11, 1984

Software is the fourth and final solo studio album by American singer Grace Slick, released in 1984 by RCA Records. The album was recorded after Slick rejoined Jefferson Starship after temporarily leaving the band in the late 1970s. After working on this album with her, Slick's collaborator Peter Wolf would go on to contribute to Jefferson Starship's 1984 album Nuclear Furniture. A music video was made for the single "All the Machines".

Software has been described as Slick's attempt to assimilate with the synth-pop sound of the period. Guitar use is largely replaced by synthesizers and electronic drums. Slick's trademark wailing vocals and improvising is replaced by more short, precise bursts.

== Critical reception ==
Professional ratings
Review scores
Source	Rating
AllMusic	2.5/5 stars
Robert Christgau	C−

The Philadelphia Inquirer wrote that Slick "jumps on the synthesizer bandwagon, putting every ping, pip and pow electro-pop has to offer into another batch of inimitably banal songs." The Wall Street Journal determined that Slick "really sings, with intelligence and control... The only problem is that the lyrics she's written for herself aren't up to Mr. Wolf's well-crafted music."

== Track listing ==
All tracks are written by Grace Slick and Peter Wolf, except where noted.

Side one
No.	Title	Length
1.	"Call It Right Call It Wrong"	3:47
2.	"Me and Me"	3:52
3.	"All the Machines"	4:47
4.	"Fox Face"	4:54

Side two
No.	Title	Length
1.	"Through the Window" (Peter Beckett)	3:32
2.	"It Just Won't Stop"	4:05
3.	"Habits"	3:50
4.	"Rearrange My Face"	3:25
5.	"Bikini Atoll" (Slick)	4:52

== Personnel ==
Musicians

- Grace Slick – lead vocals, backing vocals (1–3, 5–9)
- Peter Wolf – keyboards, synth bass, Linn programming
- Peter Maunu – guitars (1–6, 9), acoustic guitar (7)
- Brett Bloomfield – Fender bass (2)
- Brian MacLeod – Simmons drums
- Michael Spiro – percussion (2, 4, 8, 9)
- Dale Strumpel – sound effects (3, 9)
- Ina Wolf – backing vocals
- Johnny Colla – backing vocals (1–3, 5, 6, 8)
- Mickey Thomas – backing vocals (1–3, 5, 6, 8)
- Ron Nevison – backing vocals (2)
- Sean Hopper – backing vocals (3, 7)
- Paul Kantner – backing vocals (3, 7)

Production

- Ron Nevison – producer, arrangements, engineer
- Peter Wolf – arrangements
- Rick Sanchez – assistant engineer
- Doug Sax – mastering at The Mastering Lab (Hollywood, California)
- Deandra Miller – production assistant
- Michael Pangrazio – album cover illustrator
- Paykos Phior – album cover design
- Andrea Hein – album cover coordination, back cover concept
- Grace Slick – front cover concept
