= Lady Friend =

- West German picture sleeve

Single by the Byrds
- B-side: "Old John Robertson" (US); "Don't Make Waves" (UK)
- Released: July 13, 1967
- Recorded: April 26, June 14 and 21, 1967
- Studio: Columbia, Hollywood
- Genre: Rock, pop
- Length: 2:30
- Label: Columbia
- Songwriter(s): David Crosby
- Producer(s): Gary Usher

The Byrds US singles chronology
"Have You Seen Her Face" (1967)	"Lady Friend" (1967)	"Goin' Back" (1967)

The Byrds UK singles chronology
"My Back Pages" (1967)	"Lady Friend" (1967)	"Goin' Back" (1967)

"Lady Friend" is a song by the American rock band the Byrds, written by band member David Crosby and released as a single on July 13, 1967. The single was commercially unsuccessful, only charting at number 82 on the Billboard Hot 100 and failing to chart in the United Kingdom at all.

== Composition and recording ==
The song was written by Crosby in early 1967 at his home in Beverly Glen in Los Angeles. A demo of the song dating from this period, featuring Crosby accompanying himself on acoustic guitar, was included in the KPFA program The Crosby Connection, during the radio station's February 3, 2001 Grateful Dead marathon.

The Byrds' recording of the song has been described by Tim Connors as having a quick tempo and featuring a chiming guitar riff, while band biographer Johnny Rogan made note of its complex vocal harmonies and brass instrumentation. Rogan also described it as the fastest and rockiest single the Byrds had released up to that point. Crosby closely oversaw the protracted recording of the song, much to the consternation of his bandmates Roger McGuinn and Chris Hillman. Tensions in the band increased in the late stages of production when Crosby replaced Hillman and McGuinn's backing vocals with his own vocal overdubs.

== Release and reception ==
"Lady Friend" was released as a single on Columbia Records on July 13, 1967. Crosby was hopeful that the single would return the Byrds to the upper reaches of the chart, but the record received insufficient airplay and media exposure, despite the band appearing on The Tonight Show Starring Johnny Carson to perform it. Ultimately, the single failed commercially, reaching number 82 on the Billboard charts and failing to reach the charts in the United Kingdom. Crosby was bitterly disappointed by the single's lack of success and cited producer Gary Usher's mixing of the song as a contributing factor, stating in a contemporary interview with disc jockey B. Mitchel Reed, "The final mix of 'Lady Friend' sounds like mush." "Lady Friend" is the only song penned solely by Crosby to appear on the A-side of a Byrds' single.

In the press, Billboard magazine described "Lady Friend" as an "infectious wild rocker" with a "strong dance beat" and predicted that it would climb the Billboard Hot 100 "in short order". Cash Box said that it "crams exciting instrumental work with snappy vocals." Record World said that the Byrds "play their instruments with effect and their song builds into quite an experience."

The Byrds performed the song during their appearance at the Monterey Pop Festival and a recording of this performance can be found on the 1992 The Monterey International Pop Festival CD box set. The song was omitted from the Byrds' next album, The Notorious Byrd Brothers, partly due to its lack of commercial success as a single and partly due to Crosby having been fired from the band by McGuinn and Hillman midway through the recording of the album.

== Stereo mixes ==
Having initially been mixed in mono for its release as a single in 1967, "Lady Friend" wasn't released in stereo until its inclusion on the 1987 compilation album, Never Before. However, this version of the song also featured the addition of overdubbed drums, played by an unnamed session musician during preparation of the album. Rogan has described fan reaction to the new drumming as almost universally negative, with many listeners feeling that the addition of then-modern sounding drums was completely inappropriate and incongruous. Subsequently, this doctored version of the song has not appeared on any other album release.

A new stereo remix of the song, without the drum overdubs, was released on The Byrds box set in 1990. The song was also added as a bonus track to the 1996 Columbia/Legacy reissue of the Younger Than Yesterday album. In addition to its appearance on the expanded reissue of Younger Than Yesterday, "Lady Friend" also appears on several Byrds' compilations, including History of The Byrds, The Original Singles: 1967–1969, Volume 2, The Essential Byrds, and There Is a Season.

== Cover versions ==
"Lady Friend" has been covered by a number of bands and artists, including Bill Plummer and the Cosmic Brotherhood on their 1968 self-titled album, Little John on their self-titled 1971 album, the Flamin' Groovies on their 1979 album Jumpin' in the Night, and the Posies on their Nice Cheekbones and a Ph.D EP in 2001. The song was also covered by Static on the 1989 Byrds' tribute album, Time Between – A Tribute to The Byrds. In addition, Kenny Howes has also recorded a version of the song as the title track of his 2004 album, Lady Friend.
