= The House at Pooneil Corners =

Song by Jefferson Airplane

from the album Crown of Creation
- Released: September 1968
- Recorded: February–June 1968
- Genre: Psychedelic rock, acid rock
- Length: 5:54
- Label: RCA
- Songwriters: Paul Kantner, Marty Balin
- Producer: Al Schmitt

"The House at Pooneil Corners" is a song by the American rock group Jefferson Airplane and written mainly by singer Marty Balin that first appeared as the 11th and final track on the band's 1968 album Crown of Creation. It also appeared on the compilation album The Roar of Jefferson Airplane along with the similarly named song "The Ballad of You and Me and Pooneil".

Jefferson Airplane performed the song live from the roof of the Schuyler Hotel in New York City in 1968 while being filmed by Jean-Luc Godard for his project One A.M., later repurposed and released as One P.M. It was the only song that the band had completed when police stopped the show. The band also closed its 1969 Woodstock performance with the song.

== Personnel ==
- Marty Balin – vocals
- Grace Slick – vocals
- Paul Kantner – rhythm guitar, vocals
- Jorma Kaukonen – lead guitar
- Jack Casady – bass
- Spencer Dryden – drums
