= Welcome to the Wrecking Ball! =

Studio album by Grace Slick
- Released: January 28, 1981
- Recorded: 1980
- Studio: Criteria Studios (Miami, Florida); The Hit Factory (New York City, New York)
- Genre: Rock
- Length: 38:10
- Label: RCA
- Producer: Ron Frangipane

Grace Slick chronology
Dreams (1980)	Welcome to the Wrecking Ball! (1981)	Software (1984)

Professional ratings
Review scores
Source	Rating
AllMusic	2/5 stars

Welcome to the Wrecking Ball! is Grace Slick's 1981 follow-up to her solo album Dreams (1980). Her third solo album, it was released before stepping back into her old position in Jefferson Starship. The lyrics of the first track include numerous references to Slick's dislike of rock journalists and critics. The album rose to No. 48 on the Billboard charts.

== Track listing ==
All songs written by Grace Slick & Scott Zito

Side A
No.	Title	Length
1.	"Wrecking Ball"	3:49
2.	"Mistreater"	3:23
3.	"Shot in the Dark"	3:18
4.	"Round & Round"	3:37
5.	"Shooting Star"	5:19

Side B
No.	Title	Length
1.	"Just a Little Love"	4:21
2.	"Sea of Love"	4:04
3.	"Lines"	3:20
4.	"Right Kind"	3:07
5.	"No More Heroes"	3:52

== Singles ==
- "Sea of Love" (1981)
- "Mistreater" (1981)

== Personnel ==
- Grace Slick – vocals
- Paul Harris – keyboards
- Scott Zito – lead guitars, harmonica, vocals
- Danny Gulino – rhythm guitars
- Phil Stone – bass
- Bobby Torello – drums
- Joe Lala – percussion

Production

- Ron Frangipane – producer, arrangements
- Scott Zito – arrangements
- Ed Sprigg – engineer
- Mike Guerra – assistant engineer
- Alan Meyerson – assistant engineer
- Kevin Ryan – assistant engineer
- Bob Ludwig – mastering at Masterdisk (NYC)
- Jim Mesham – equipment manager
- Tony King – creative director
- Skip Johnson – cover concept, management
- Grace Slick – cover concept
- Joe Stelmach – art director
- Roger Ressmeyer – photography
- "Bijou" – make-up
