= Dreams (Grace Slick album) =

Studio album by Grace Slick
- Released: March 18, 1980
- Recorded: 1979
- Studio: Hit Factory, New York City; RCA, New York City; Record Plant, Sausalito
- Genre: Rock; psychedelic rock
- Length: 45:45
- Label: RCA
- Producer: Ron Frangipane

Grace Slick chronology
Dragon Fly (1974)	Dreams (1980)	Welcome to the Wrecking Ball! (1981)

Singles from Grace Slick
- 1. "Seasons" Released: April 1980 (US); 2. "Dreams" Released: 1980 (UK, US)

Professional ratings
Review scores
Source	Rating
AllMusic	2/5 stars
Classic Rock	6/10 stars
Q	4/5 stars

Dreams is the second solo album by Grace Slick, released by RCA Records in March 1980. One single, "Seasons", was released in the United States to promote the record and peaked at No. 95 on the Billboard Hot 100. "Seasons" fared much better in the Netherlands, peaking at No. 17 and was performed by Slick on the Dutch music show TopPop. In the United Kingdom, the track "Dreams" was issued as a single, reaching No. 50 on the chart and No. 104 in the United States on the Billboard Bubbling Under Hot 100 chart. It was recorded in New York without any previous or current members of Jefferson Starship. The album reached no. 32 on the Billboard charts; it also reached no. 28 on the UK Albums Chart.

== Track listing ==
Side one
No.	Title	Writer(s)	Length
1.	"Dreams"	Sean Delaney	5:04
2.	"El Diablo"	Gary Gegan	5:52
3.	"Face to the Wind"	Scott Zito	5:34
4.	"Angel of Night"	Zito	3:49
5.	"Seasons"	Grace Slick	3:23

Side two
No.	Title	Writer(s)	Length
1.	"Do It the Hard Way"	Slick	4:54
2.	"Full Moon Man"	Slick	5:05
3.	"Let It Go"	Slick	5:41
4.	"Garden of Man"	Slick	6:23

== Charts ==
Chart (1980/81)	Peak position
Australia (Kent Music Report)	46
United Kingdom (Official Charts Company)	28
United States (Billboard 200)	32

== Personnel ==
- Grace Slick – vocals, piano on "Garden of Man"
- Ron Frangipane – conductor on "Dreams", "Seasons", "Let It Go", and "Garden of Man", Oberheim synthesizer player on "Dreams" and "Garden of Man"
- Frank Owens – solo piano on "Dreams"
- Scott Zito – lead guitars on "Face to the Wind" and "Let It Go", electric guitar on all other tracks except "Seasons", acoustic guitar on "El Diablo" and "Seasons", bottleneck guitar on "Do It the Hard Way", vocals on "Angel of Night"
- Sal DiTroia – rhythm electric guitar on "Face to the Wind", acoustic guitar on all other tracks except "Dreams" and "Angel of Night", guitar solo on "El Diablo"
- George Wadenius – 2nd lead electric guitar on "Face to the Wind", electric guitar on "Do It the Hard Way" and "Full Moon Man", acoustic guitar on all other tracks except "Dreams" and "Angel of Night"
- Neil Jason – electric bass on "Dreams", guitar on "El Diablo", Fender bass on "El Diablo", bass on all other tracks
- Allan Schwartzberg – drums
- Jim Malin – percussion on all tracks except "Dreams" and "Garden of Man"
- Joe D'Elia – piano on "Face to the Wind", "Seasons", "Do It the Hard Way" and "Let It Go", solo piano on "Full Moon Man"
- Geoff Farr – Oberheim synthesizer programmer on "Dreams" and "Garden of Man"
- Gene Orloff – concertmaster on "Dreams"
- Artie Kaplan – orchestra contractor on "Dreams", "Seasons", "Let It Go" and "Garden of Man", baritone saxophone on "Full Moon Man"
- Edward Walsh – Oberheim synthesizer on "El Diablo", "Face to the Wind", "Full Moon Man", "Let It Go" and "Garden of Man"
- Celebration Singers – chorus on "Seasons"
- Harry Lookofsky – concertmaster on "Seasons", "Let It Go" and "Garden of Man"
- Dave Tofani – tenor saxophone on "Full Moon Man"
- Phil Bodner – tenor saxophone on "Full Moon Man"
- Ronnie Cuber – baritone saxophone on "Full Moon Man"
- Joe Shepley – solo piccolo trumpet on "Let It Go"
- Steve Price – drums on "Garden of Man"
- George Devens – percussion on "Garden of Man"
- David Feiedman – percussion on "Garden of Man"

Production

- Ron Frangipane – producer, arrangements
- Ed Sprigg – engineer
- Jon Smith, Alex Kasbevaross – assistant engineers
- Grace Slick – album concept
- Gribbitt (Tim Bryant), J. J. Stelmach, RCA – art direction
- Ron Slenzak – cover photo
