= Triad (David Crosby song) =

1967 song

Song by the Byrds

from the album Never Before
- Released: December 1, 1987
- Recorded: August 17, 1967
- Studio: Columbia Studios, Hollywood, CA
- Genre: Rock
- Length: 3:29
- Label: Re-Flyte, Murray Hill
- Songwriter: David Crosby
- Producer: Gary Usher

"Triad"

Song by Jefferson Airplane

from the album Crown of Creation
- Released: September 1968
- Recorded: May 1968
- Genre: Rock
- Length: 4:55
- Label: RCA
- Songwriter: David Crosby
- Producer: Al Schmitt

"Triad"

Song by Crosby, Stills, Nash & Young

from the album 4 Way Street
- Released: April 7, 1971
- Recorded: June 2–July 5, 1970, New York, Chicago & Los Angeles (exact date and venue unknown)
- Genre: Rock
- Length: 5:07
- Label: Atlantic
- Songwriter: David Crosby
- Producers: David Crosby, Stephen Stills, Graham Nash, Neil Young

"Triad" is a song written by the American singer-songwriter David Crosby in 1967 about a ménage à trois. It was recorded by the Byrds that year, while Crosby was a member of the band, but their version went unreleased at the time and was not issued until twenty years later. Jefferson Airplane released a version of the song in 1968 on their Crown of Creation album and a live version performed by Crosby was included on Crosby, Stills, Nash & Young's 4 Way Street in 1971.

== Composition and recording ==
"Triad" was written while Crosby was a member of the rock band the Byrds, who were at that time recording their fifth studio album, The Notorious Byrd Brothers. The song's lyrics concern a ménage à trois and were largely inspired by the sexual freedom that Crosby enjoyed at his home in Beverly Glen in Los Angeles. Byrds biographer Johnny Rogan has described the song's subject matter as being perfectly in keeping with the "free love" hippie philosophies of the day. The song also alludes to author Robert A. Heinlein's science fiction novel Stranger in a Strange Land, with references to "sister lovers" and "water brothers".

Although the Byrds did record "Triad" and performed it live during a September 1967 engagement at the Whisky a Go Go, it was not included on The Notorious Byrd Brothers album. According to Crosby, bandmates Roger McGuinn and Chris Hillman felt that its subject matter was too controversial, with McGuinn allegedly deriding the song as a "freak-out orgy tune". However, this has since been denied by Hillman, who has stated, "I don't think it was a moral decision. The song just didn't work that well. David was drifting and bored and wanted to do something else, and that song just added fuel to the fire."

There had been growing animosity between Crosby and the rest of the band throughout 1967, which, coupled with the discord over "Triad", contributed to McGuinn and Hillman's decision to fire him from the band in October of that year.

== Releases ==
Following his departure from the Byrds, Crosby gave the song to the band Jefferson Airplane, who included a recording of it on their 1968 album, Crown of Creation. This version also appears on Jefferson Airplane singer Grace Slick's compilation album The Best of Grace Slick.

A live recording of "Triad" performed by Crosby himself was later included on Crosby, Stills, Nash & Young's 1971 album, 4 Way Street.

The Byrds recording of the song remained unreleased for twenty years until the 1987 archival album Never Before was issued. It also appears on The Byrds box set from 1990, as a bonus track on the 1997 Columbia/Legacy reissue of The Notorious Byrd Brothers, and on the 2006 There Is a Season box set.
