= Younger Than Yesterday =

Studio album by the Byrds
- Released: February 6, 1967
- Recorded: November 28 – December 8, 1966
- Studio: Columbia, Hollywood
- Genre: Rock; folk rock; psychedelic rock; country rock; raga rock
- Length: 29:11
- Label: Columbia
- Producer: Gary Usher

The Byrds chronology
Fifth Dimension (1966)	Younger Than Yesterday (1967)	The Byrds' Greatest Hits (1967)

Singles from Younger Than Yesterday
- 1. "So You Want to Be a Rock 'n' Roll Star" Released: January 9, 1967; 2. "My Back Pages" Released: March 13, 1967; 3. "Have You Seen Her Face" Released: May 22, 1967

Younger Than Yesterday is the fourth studio album by the American rock band the Byrds, released on February 6, 1967, by Columbia Records. It saw the band continuing to integrate elements of psychedelia and jazz into their music, a process they had begun on their previous album, Fifth Dimension. In addition, the album captured the band and record producer Gary Usher experimenting with new musical textures, including brass instruments, reverse tape effects and an electronic oscillator.

The album also marked the emergence of the band's bass player Chris Hillman as a talented songwriter and vocalist. Prior to Younger Than Yesterday, Hillman had only received one shared writing credit with the Byrds, but this album saw him credited as the sole composer of four songs and a co-writer of "So You Want to Be a Rock 'n' Roll Star". Byrds expert Tim Connors has remarked that two of Hillman's compositions on Younger Than Yesterday exhibited country and western influences and thus can be seen as early indicators of the country rock experimentation that would feature—to a greater or lesser degree—on all of the Byrds' subsequent albums.

Upon release, the album peaked at number 24 on the Billboard Top LPs chart and reached number 37 on the UK Albums Chart. It was preceded by the "So You Want to Be a Rock 'n' Roll Star" single in January 1967, which reached the Top 30 of the Billboard Hot 100. Two additional singles taken from the album, "My Back Pages" and "Have You Seen Her Face", were also moderately successful on the Billboard singles chart. However, none of the singles taken from the album charted in the United Kingdom. Music critics Richie Unterberger and David Fricke have both remarked that although it was largely overlooked by the public at the time of its release, the album's critical standing has improved over the years and today Younger Than Yesterday is considered one of the Byrds' best albums. The title of Younger Than Yesterday is derived from the lyrics of "My Back Pages", a song written by Bob Dylan, which was covered on the album.

== Background ==
The Byrds had initially come to international prominence in mid-1965, when their folk rock interpretation of Bob Dylan's "Mr. Tambourine Man" reached number 1 on both the U.S. Billboard Hot 100 chart and the UK Singles Chart. Further commercial successes followed, with the band releasing two hit albums and reaching number 1 for a second time in the U.S., with a cover version of Pete Seeger's "Turn! Turn! Turn! (to Everything There is a Season)". Throughout the latter half of 1965, the band enjoyed tremendous popularity among teenage pop fans and their music received widespread airplay on Top 40 radio. In early 1966, the Byrds' principal songwriter, Gene Clark, departed the band, leaving Jim McGuinn, David Crosby, Chris Hillman, and Michael Clarke to complete the band's third album, Fifth Dimension, without him. Upon release, Fifth Dimension received a mixed critical reception and was less commercially successful than the band's earlier albums. As a result, the Byrds' popularity began to wane and by late 1966, they had been all but forgotten by mainstream pop audiences.

Shortly after the release of Fifth Dimension, the Byrds found themselves without a record producer, when Allen Stanton, who had worked with them on that album, left Columbia Records to work for A&M. The band chose to replace Stanton with Gary Usher, a former songwriting partner of Brian Wilson of the Beach Boys, who had recently co-produced Clark's debut solo album, Gene Clark with the Gosdin Brothers. In addition to producing the recording sessions for Younger Than Yesterday, Usher would produce the band's next two albums. The Byrds' biographer Johnny Rogan states that Usher's wealth of production experience and love of innovative studio experimentation would prove invaluable as the group entered their most creatively adventurous phase. Author David N. Howard has also remarked that despite the hodgepodge of styles and genres present on Younger Than Yesterday, Usher's studio expertise gives the album an impressively uniform consistency.

Following an intensive period of rehearsal at their Sunset Boulevard headquarters, the Byrds completed the entire Younger Than Yesterday album at Columbia Studios, Hollywood, during a work-intensive, eleven-day period, starting on November 28 and finishing on December 8, 1966. The original working title for the LP was Sanctuary, but ultimately this was dropped in favor of a title inspired by the chorus lyrics of the album's Bob Dylan cover, "My Back Pages":

Ah, but I was so much older then,
I'm younger than that now.

Although Clark had left the Byrds prior to completion of the Fifth Dimension album, he did participate in the recording of the songs "Eight Miles High" and "Captain Soul" from that record. As a result, Younger Than Yesterday was the first album to be entirely recorded by the Byrds without Clark's participation. As on Fifth Dimension, guitarists McGuinn and Crosby continued to hone their songwriting skills in an attempt to fill the void left by Clark's departure.

However, the most surprising development within the Byrds at this time was the emergence of bass player Chris Hillman as both a lead vocalist and the band's third songwriter. Prior to the recording of Younger Than Yesterday, Hillman had never sung lead vocals on a Byrds' recording and his only writing contribution with the band had been a shared credit for the instrumental track "Captain Soul". On this album, however, he is credited as the sole songwriter of "Have You Seen Her Face", "Time Between", "Thoughts and Words", and "The Girl with No Name", with all four tracks featuring him as the lead vocalist. Hillman is also credited as the co-writer of "So You Want to Be a Rock 'n' Roll Star", which he sings with McGuinn and Crosby.

== Music ==
Time Between
An excerpt from the Chris Hillman composition "Time Between", which foreshadowed the Byrds' later exploration of country rock. Session musician Clarence White's countrified lead guitar playing can be clearly heard in this clip.

So You Want to Be a Rock 'n' Roll Star
An excerpt from "So You Want to Be a Rock 'n' Roll Star", highlighting the trumpet playing of Hugh Masekela and the satirical nature of the song's lyrics.

Younger Than Yesterday found the Byrds expanding their musical style in several different directions. Music critic John Harris has described the album as the Byrds' "West Coastified version of the Revolver aesthetic", with reference to the Beatles' 1966 album. Chris Hillman contributed two country rock-flavored songs with "Time Between" and "The Girl with No Name", the latter of which was inspired by a young lady with the unusual moniker of Girl Freiberg. (Note: Girl Freiberg was married to David Freiberg of the San Francisco band Quicksilver Messenger Service at the time that "The Girl with No Name" was written. Her maiden name was Julia Dreyer.) "Time Between", on the other hand, was a Paul McCartney-influenced pop song and the result of Hillman's first ever attempt at writing a song on his own. Both songs featured the country-style guitar playing of session musician Clarence White, who would go on to become a full member of the Byrds' latter-day line-up from 1968 through to 1973. Byrds expert Tim Connors has suggested that the pop-country sound of "Time Between" and "The Girl with No Name"—like "Mr. Spaceman" from the band's previous album—anticipated the experimentation with country music that would color the Byrds' subsequent albums.

In addition to these two country-tinged songs, Hillman also contributed the LSD-influenced "Thoughts and Words", a metaphysical meditation on human relationships that featured the sitar-like sound of backwards guitar effects. A fourth Hillman-penned song on the album, the British Invasion-influenced "Have You Seen Her Face", was considered commercial enough to be issued as a single in the U.S. some months after the release of the album. Tim Connors had remarked on his Byrdwatcher website that these four melodic, romantically themed Hillman songs brought to the album elements that had largely been missing from the band's recordings since Clark's departure.

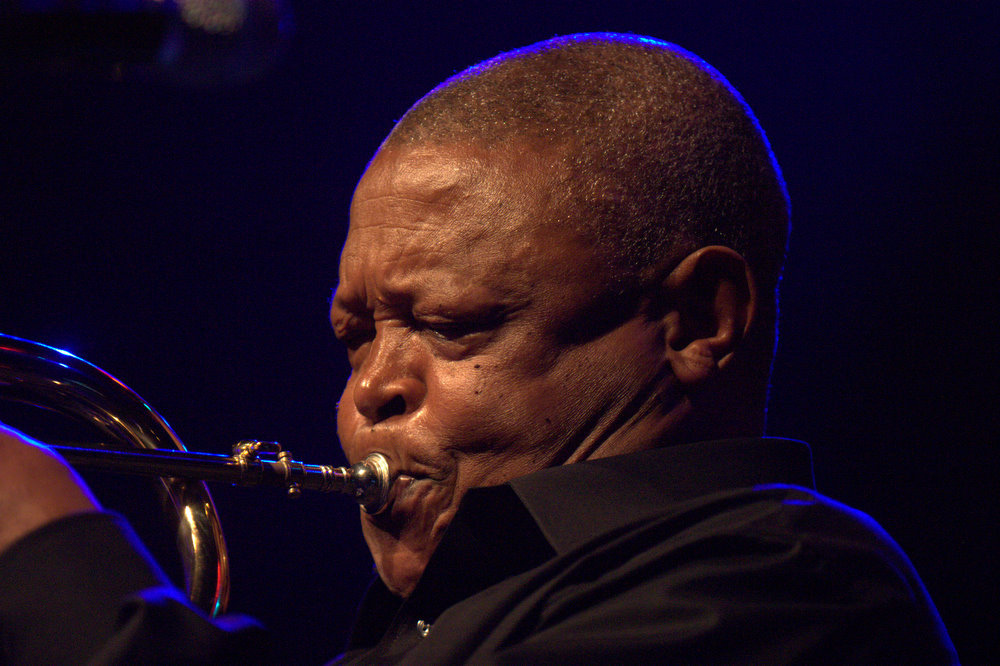
Jazz musician Hugh Masekela performed the trumpet solo on the song "So You Want to Be a Rock 'n' Roll Star".

Hillman also had a hand in writing the album's opening track, "So You Want to Be a Rock 'n' Roll Star". With its satirical and sarcastic lyrics, the song was an acerbic, but good-natured swipe at the success of manufactured pop bands like the Monkees. However, Connors has stated that "So You Want to Be a Rock 'n' Roll Star" also suggests certain ironies due to pre-fabricated aspects of the Byrds' own origin, including drummer Michael Clarke having been initially recruited for his good looks, rather than for his musical ability. As a result of this, music journalist David Fricke has said that some fans have mistaken "So You Want to Be a Rock 'n' Roll Star" for an autobiographical song. Hillman's driving bassline and McGuinn's chiming twelve-string Rickenbacker guitar riff form the core of the song, with the production being rounded off by the sound of screaming teenage fans, which had been recorded at a Byrds' concert in Bournemouth during the band's 1965 English tour. South African jazz musician Hugh Masekela contributed the trumpet solo featured in the song, which represented the first use of brass on a Byrds' recording. Masekela and the Byrds would later perform "So You Want to Be a Rock 'n' Roll Star" together at the Monterey Pop Festival on June 17, 1967.

McGuinn and Crosby's songs, written both separately and together, represented an expansion of the jazz influences and psychedelia that had been featured heavily on the band's previous album. The song "C.T.A.-102", named after the CTA-102 quasar and written by McGuinn and his science-fiction-minded friend Bob Hippard, was a whimsical, but ultimately serious song that speculated on the existence of intelligent extraterrestrial life. McGuinn explained the inspiration for the song in a 1973 interview with ZigZag magazine: "At the time we wrote it I thought it might be possible to make contact with quasars, but later I found out that they were stars which are imploding at a tremendous velocity. They're condensing and spinning at the same time, and the nucleus is sending out tremendous amounts of radiation, some of which is audible as an electronic impulse on a computerized radio telescope. It comes out in a rhythmic pattern ... and originally, the radio astronomers who received these impulses thought they were from a life-form in space." Although the band's earlier song "Mr. Spaceman" had been thematically similar, "C.T.A.-102" was a slightly more serious attempt at tackling the subject matter, highlighted by the extensive use of studio sound effects, simulated alien voices, and the sound of an electronic oscillator.

We used earphones fed into microphones and talked into them ... and then we speeded it up. [It] was just nonsense, but we deliberately tried to make it sound like a backwards tape so that people would try to reverse it. We were playing a joke, really, because it was a big fad at the time to play things backwards.

— Roger McGuinn explaining the creation of the alien voice effects used in the song "C.T.A.-102".

Crosby's songwriting skills had also developed rapidly, with Fricke citing "Renaissance Fair" (co-written with McGuinn) as an example of his increasingly wistful lyricism and writing style. The song was inspired by a visit to the Renaissance Pleasure Faire of Southern California and Connors has described its dream-like medieval ambiance as being a thematic precursor to Crosby's later song "Guinnevere". Fricke has also praised the instrumental interplay between the "church bell peal" of Crosby and McGuinn's guitars, and Hillman's melodic, loping bass, while describing the song as "a radiant evocation of a medieval festival, and by extension the sensual idealism of the hippie dream". Writing for the AllMusic website, critic Bruce Eder attempted to sum up the song's contemporary relevance by suggesting that it was "a topical song every bit as tied to real events as Buffalo Springfield's 'For What It's Worth'". In addition, Eder also described "Renaissance Fair" as "a perfect synthesis of the group's original electric-folk sound evolved into a new, more contemporary form of music and songwriting, almost hippie-folk music".

Another of Crosby's songwriting contributions to the album was the moody, jazz-influenced "Everybody's Been Burned", a somber meditation on the need to find a balance between disillusionment and resolute perseverance in a relationship. Although the song was regarded by many critics as a leap forward in terms of musical sophistication upon its release, it was actually written in 1962, two years before the formation of the Byrds. Originally written as a nightclub torch song, Crosby had recorded demos of "Everybody's Been Burned" as early as 1963. An acoustic recording of the song by Crosby, dating from this pre-Byrds period, was eventually released on the archival album Preflyte Plus in 2012. Author Johnny Rogan has stated that the Byrds' recording of the song features one of Crosby's best vocal performances and one of McGuinn's most moving guitar solos, while critic Thomas Ward described it as "one of the most haunting songs in the Byrds' catalogue, and one of David Crosby's finest compositions". Cash Box called it "a slow-moving, blues-drenched soft-rocker."

Crosby's ambitions for artistic control within the band were expanding along with his compositional skill, and the resulting turmoil would ultimately lead to his dismissal from the group during recording sessions for the Byrds' next album, The Notorious Byrd Brothers. One source of discontent for Crosby during the recording of Younger Than Yesterday was related to the Bob Dylan cover "My Back Pages". The song had been suggested as a suitable vehicle for the Byrds by their manager, Jim Dickson, but since it was the fourth song from Dylan's Another Side of Bob Dylan album that the band had covered, Crosby felt that recording "My Back Pages" was formulaic and a step backwards artistically. However, since the album's release, critics have praised the song as one of the Byrds' strongest Dylan interpretations.

Everybody's Been Burned
A sample of the David Crosby-penned "Everybody's Been Burned", which has been described as "one of the most haunting songs in the Byrds' catalogue".

Meanwhile, Crosby insisted upon the inclusion of the contentious track "Mind Gardens", which was disliked by the other band members and derided by McGuinn as having no "rhythm, meter, or rhyme". In conversation with Byrds biographer Johnny Rogan in 1980, Crosby defended the song by stating, "it was unusual and not everybody could understand it because they'd never heard anything like it before. At that time everything was supposed to have rhyme and have rhythm. And it neither rhymed nor had rhythm, so it was outside of their experience. It was just a little story and what it said was true ... if you build walls around your mind to keep out the abuse and harshness of life and the pain, then you also shut out the joy and the love." Although "Mind Gardens" is often dismissed by critics and fans for being self-indulgent, Rogan has commented that its raga rock ambiance, symbolic lyrics and attractive backwards guitar effects capture the Byrds at their most creatively ambitious.

Crosby also fought to have the song "Why" (co-written with McGuinn) included on the album, despite it having already been issued as the B-side of the band's "Eight Miles High" single, some eleven months earlier. However, the version of "Why" included on Younger Than Yesterday was recorded during sessions for that album and is a totally different take from the previously released B-side version. Exactly why Crosby insisted on resurrecting the song, when there was newer original material in reserve, remains a mystery, although the Byrds' roadie, Jimmi Seiter, has speculated that it was an attempt to increase Crosby's share of the songwriting on the album. Author Peter Lavezzoli has remarked that "Why" features verses with a chord structure reminiscent of "(Love Is Like a) Heat Wave" by Martha and the Vandellas and a raga-flavored lead guitar solo inspired by the music of sitarist Ravi Shankar. However, Rogan has described the song's Indian classical music influences as being considerably watered down on the re-recording, when compared to the earlier B-side version.

== Release and reception ==
Younger Than Yesterday was released on February 6, 1967, in the United States (catalogue item CL 2642 in mono, CS 9442 in stereo) and April 7, 1967, in the UK (catalogue item BPG 62988 in mono, SBPG 62988 in stereo). It peaked at number 24 on the Billboard Top LPs chart, during a stay of 24 weeks, and reached number 37 in the United Kingdom, spending a total of 4 weeks on the UK chart. The album's front cover featured a composite multiple exposure photograph of the band, taken by Frank Bez.

The album was preceded by the "So You Want to Be a Rock 'n' Roll Star" single, which was released on January 9, 1967, and reached number 29 on the Billboard Hot 100, but failed to chart in the UK. Two additional singles taken from the album, "My Back Pages" and "Have You Seen Her Face", reached number 30 and number 74 on the Billboard chart respectively, but again missed the UK chart. The "My Back Pages" single was the last single release by the Byrds to reach the Top 40 of the Billboard Hot 100.

=== Contemporary reception ===
Upon release, the album received mostly positive reviews from the music press, with Billboard magazine predicting that "the Byrds will be riding high on the LP charts again with this top rock package." Pete Johnson in the Los Angeles Times was more cautious, noting that "the album is a good one, but it would be sad if it served as a monument, marking the end of the Byrds' development. There is little to distinguish it from their previous LPs in terms of creativity." A resoundingly positive review came from the pen of Peter Reilly, writing in Hi-Fi/Stereo Review, who described the record as "an enjoyable and well-made album which, if listened to closely enough, explains a good deal about what is going on around us".

However, the burgeoning underground press in the U.S. was less complimentary, with Richard Goldstein of The Village Voice writing that "There is nothing new or startling on Younger Than Yesterday." A slightly more favorable review by Sandy Pearlman in Crawdaddy! expressed some reservations, but praised the album's musical eclecticism, while noting "This sound is dense, but not obviously and impressively complicated. That is, it is very coherent. It works because of its unity, not out of an accumulation of contrasting effects such as volume changes and syncopations."

In the UK, journalist Penny Valentine, writing in Disc magazine, described the album as a return to form for the Byrds, before declaring that the band were "back where they belong with a sound as fresh as cream and sunflowers". Melody Maker was also enthusiastic about the album, commenting, "if you ignore this album you are not only foolish – but deaf!" Record Mirror awarded the album four stars out of five, while Allen Evans of the NME enthused: "This is an exciting album, at times brash and noisy ('So You Want to Be a Rock 'n' Roll Star', 'Have You Seen Her Face'), spooky (the science-fiction outer-space sounds on 'C.T.A.-102'), folksy ('Everybody's Been Burned'), weird (the irritating, monotonous backing to 'Mind Gardens'), and pleasant (the soft swinging of 'The Girl with No Name'). A lot of thought has gone into this album and it's good because of it."

Author Peter Buckley attempted to evaluate Younger Than Yesterday's contemporary impact more than 30 years after the fact in his 1999 book The Rough Guide to Rock: "The album had room for everything from Hugh Masekela's trumpet to droning sitar-like riffs, a brew that may've been too rich for the Byrds' rapidly shrinking teen audience, but was perfectly in tune with a new underground following who disdained hit singles but were coming to regard albums as major artistic statements."

=== Modern reception ===
[Younger Than Yesterday] is my favorite Byrds album of all. I loved it, I thought we did a great job ... I think we were maturing as talents then, and I think we did really good work on that record.

— David Crosby reflecting on the album during a 1998 interview.

Although Younger Than Yesterday was somewhat overlooked by the record-buying public at the time of its release, achieving only moderate chart success as a result, its critical stature has grown substantially over the years. In his 2003 book Eight Miles High: Folk-Rock's Flight from Haight-Ashbury to Woodstock, Richie Unterberger states that Younger Than Yesterday "was [the Byrds'] best album besides Mr. Tambourine Man, and more progressive in many ways". The author goes on to say that the album and its follow-up are "now revered as two of the great 1960s albums by historians and fans", while also acknowledging that "at the time, though, the Byrds were considered by many to be waning." Unterberger also praised the album in his review for the AllMusic website, describing it as one of "the most durable of the Byrds' albums".

Rock critic David Fricke, writing for Rolling Stone magazine in 2007, called Younger Than Yesterday "the Byrds' first mature album, a blend of space-flight twang and electric hoedown infused with the imminent glow of 1967 yet underlined with crackling realism". Critic John Nork gave the album a glowing review on the Analogue Planet website, calling it "a scrumptious smorgasbord of eclectic musical styles and groundbreaking innovation", before concluding that "in every sense, Younger Than Yesterday is an utterly brilliant album, arguably the Byrds' best." Alan Bisbort, writing in the book Rhino's Psychedelic Trip, described Younger Than Yesterday as "an essential snapshot of an incense-scented, acid-drenched world in motion: a kaleidoscope whose every turn yielded some fantastic window on the age".

In 2003, the album was ranked at number 124 on Rolling Stone magazine's list of The 500 Greatest Albums of All Time. When the list was revised in 2012, to accommodate a number of albums released since 2003, Younger Than Yesterday was repositioned at number 127. It was voted number 197 in Colin Larkin's All Time Top 1000 Albums 3rd Edition (2000).

=== CD reissues ===
Younger Than Yesterday was issued on Compact Disc for the first time by Edsel Records in 1987. It was later reissued by Columbia in the U.S. in 1989 and in the UK in 1993. It was then remastered at 20-bit resolution and reissued (with three of its tracks remixed) in an expanded form on April 30, 1996, as part of the Columbia/Legacy Byrds series. The Columbia/Legacy reissue featured six bonus tracks, including "Lady Friend" and "Old John Robertson", which had both been issued on a non-album single in July 1967. The remastered CD also included the David Crosby-penned track "It Happens Each Day", which had been omitted from the original album, and "Don't Make Waves", a song that had been written and recorded by the Byrds for the 1967 Alexander Mackendrick film Don't Make Waves. The final track on the Columbia/Legacy CD extends to include a hidden track featuring the guitar parts from "Mind Gardens", which were heard on the album playing backwards, but are presented here playing forwards, as they were recorded.

In 2011, the audiophile record label Audio Fidelity released the original mono mix of Younger Than Yesterday on CD for the first time, remastered by audio engineer Steve Hoffman. The mono version of the album was reissued again, along with its stereo counterpart and three bonus tracks, on a single Blu-spec CD in Japan in 2012.

== Track listing ==
=== Side one ===
1. "So You Want to Be a Rock 'n' Roll Star" (Jim McGuinn, Chris Hillman) – 2:05
2. "Have You Seen Her Face" (Chris Hillman) – 2:25
3. "C.T.A.-102" (Jim McGuinn, Robert J. Hippard) – 2:28
4. "Renaissance Fair" (David Crosby, Jim McGuinn) – 1:51
5. "Time Between" (Chris Hillman) – 1:53
6. "Everybody's Been Burned" (David Crosby) – 3:05

=== Side two ===
1. "Thoughts and Words" (Chris Hillman) – 2:56
2. "Mind Gardens" (David Crosby) – 3:28
3. "My Back Pages" (Bob Dylan) – 3:08
4. "The Girl with No Name" (Chris Hillman) – 1:50
5. "Why" (Jim McGuinn, David Crosby) – 2:45

=== 1996 CD reissue bonus tracks ===
12. "It Happens Each Day" (David Crosby) – 2:44
13. "Don't Make Waves" (Jim McGuinn, Chris Hillman) – 1:36
14. "My Back Pages" [Alternate Version] (Bob Dylan) – 2:42
15. "Mind Gardens" [Alternate Version] (David Crosby) – 3:17
16. "Lady Friend" (David Crosby) – 2:30
17. "Old John Robertson" [Single Version] (Jim McGuinn, Chris Hillman) – 5:05
  - Note: this song ends at 1:53; at 2:03 begins "Mind Gardens" [Instrumental Guitar Track] (David Crosby)

== Singles ==
1. "So You Want to Be a Rock 'n' Roll Star" b/w "Everybody's Been Burned" (Columbia 43987) January 9, 1967 (US: number 29)
2. "My Back Pages" b/w "Renaissance Fair" (Columbia 44054) March 13, 1967 (US: number 30)
3. "Have You Seen Her Face" b/w "Don't Make Waves" (Columbia 44157) May 22, 1967 (US: number 74)

== Personnel ==
Adapted from So You Want to Be a Rock 'n' Roll Star: The Byrds Day-By-Day (1965–1973), The Byrds: Timeless Flight Revisited, the compact disc liner notes, and other online sources:

Credits include bonus tracks on CD and digital releases of the album.

The Byrds

- Jim McGuinn – lead guitar, vocals
- David Crosby – rhythm guitar, vocals
- Chris Hillman – electric bass, vocals (acoustic guitar on "It Happens Each Day")
- Michael Clarke – drums

Additional personnel

- Hugh Masekela – trumpet (on "So You Want to Be a Rock 'n' Roll Star" and "Lady Friend")
- Cecil Barnard (Hotep Idris Galeta) – piano (on "Have You Seen Her Face")
- Jay Migliori – saxophone (on "Renaissance Fair")
- Vern Gosdin – acoustic guitar (on "Time Between")
- Clarence White – guitar (on "Time Between" and "The Girl with No Name")
- Daniel Rey (Big Black) – percussion

== Release history ==
Date	Label	Format	Country	Catalog	Notes
February 6, 1967	Columbia	LP	US	CL 2642	Original mono release.
February 6, 1967	Columbia	LP	US	CS 9442	Original stereo release.
April 7, 1967	CBS	LP	UK	BPG 62988	Original mono release.
April 7, 1967	CBS	LP	UK	SBPG 62988	Original stereo release.
1987	Edsel	LP	UK	ED 227	
1987	Edsel	CD	UK	EDCD 227	Original CD release.
1989	Columbia	CD	US	CK 9442	
1993	Columbia	CD	UK	COL 468181	
April 30, 1996	Columbia/Legacy	CD	US	CK 64848	Reissue containing six bonus tracks and a partially remixed version of the stereo album.
May 6, 1996	Columbia/Legacy	CD	UK	COL 4837082	Reissue containing six bonus tracks and a partially remixed version of the stereo album.
1999	Simply Vinyl	LP	UK	SVLP 0007	Reissue of the partially remixed stereo album.
1999	Sundazed	LP	US	LP 5060	Reissue of the partially remixed stereo album with three bonus tracks.
2003	Sony	CD	Japan	MHCP-69	Reissue containing the partially remixed stereo album and six bonus tracks in a replica LP sleeve.
2006	Sundazed	LP	US	LP 5200	Reissue of the original mono release.
March 22, 2011	Audio Fidelity	CD	US	AFZ110	Reissue of the original mono release.
May 30, 2012	Sony Music Entertainment	CD	Japan	SICP-20375	Reissue of the original mono release and the partially remixed stereo album, with three bonus tracks in a replica LP sleeve.

=== Remix information ===
Younger Than Yesterday was one of four Byrds albums that were remixed as part of their re-release on Columbia/Legacy. The reason for these remixes was explained by Bob Irwin (who produced these re-issues for compact disc) during an interview with ICE magazine in 1996:

The first four Byrds albums had sold so well, and the master tapes used so much that they were at least two, if not three generations down from the original. In most cases, a first-generation master no longer existed. They were basically played to death; they were worn out, there was nothing left of them.

He further stated:

Each album is taken from the original multi-tracks, where they exist, which is in 95% of the cases. We remixed them exactly as they were, without taking any liberties, except for the occasional song appearing in stereo for the first time.

== Bibliography ==
- Rogan, Johnny, The Byrds: Timeless Flight Revisited, Rogan House, 1998, ISBN 0-9529540-1-X
- Hjort, Christopher, So You Want To Be A Rock 'n' Roll Star: The Byrds Day-By-Day (1965–1973), Jawbone Press, 2008, ISBN 1-906002-15-0.
