= Crown of Creation =

Studio album by Jefferson Airplane
- Released: August 18, 1968
- Recorded: February–June 1968
- Studios: RCA (Hollywood, California)
- Genres: Rock, psychedelic rock, acid rock
- Length: 37:58
- Label: RCA Victor
- Producer: Al Schmitt

Jefferson Airplane chronology
After Bathing at Baxter's (1967)	Crown of Creation (1968)	Bless Its Pointed Little Head (1969)

Crown of Creation is the fourth studio album by the San Francisco psychedelic rock band Jefferson Airplane, released by RCA Victor on August 18, 1968. The album saw the band continuing their development of psychedelic music, emphasizing acid rock with science fiction themes.

While failing to eclipse Surrealistic Pillow (1967) from a commercial standpoint, the album was a considerable success in comparison to its immediate predecessor, After Bathing at Baxter's (1967), peaking at No. 6 on the Billboard Pop Charts and earning a RIAA gold certification. Its two singles ("Greasy Heart", released in March 1968, followed by the title track in November) were modest hits on the Hot 100 chart. It was voted number 591 in Colin Larkin's All Time Top 1000 Albums 3rd Edition (2000).

== Background ==
Jefferson Airplane's third album, After Bathing at Baxter's, had received warm reviews from the underground press but was a relative commercial disappointment after Surrealistic Pillow, failing to reach gold record status. Just prior to recording the follow up, the group had their manager and promoter Bill Thompson purchase a large 20-room, three-story, home at 2400 Fulton Street directly across from Golden Gate Park in San Francisco where the members would live communally. Costing $73,000, the home, known as "The Airplane House" or simply "The Mansion" included a refurbished basement with a built-in recording studio. The band became a tight grouping and much of their composing began at their new headquarters. The combination of individuals continued the experimentation and visionary lyrical compositions that made them quintessential in the San Francisco psychedelic rock scene. Writing was generally equal among the group members as they all took part in one or more tracks, with Marty Balin returning to the songwriting fold after his near-absence on After Bathing at Baxter's.

== Compositions and recording ==
The band returned to RCA Studios in Hollywood on February 20, 1968 with producer Al Schmitt to record two tracks for their next single, Grace Slick's "Greasy Heart" backed by Marty Balin's "Share A Little Joke" (a song about its co-writer, band friend Gary Blackman). "Greasy Heart" was a hard rock song with wah-wah guitar work from Jorma Kaukonen that took lyrical aim at phony socialites obsessed with hair dyes, waxing and cosmetic surgery yet flopped on release that March, reaching #98 on Billboard and falling off the charts in just three weeks.

The rest of the album was recorded between March and June, in between gigs when time permitted, during which the band overdubbed numerous distorted sound effects and multilayered guitar parts, with many tracks featuring Kaukonen's newly acquired wah-wah pedal. Balin wrote or co-wrote four tracks including "Share A Little Joke", the funky, wah-wah laden "If You Feel" (also penned with Blackman and inspired by the German poet Rainer Maria Rilke) and two songs with Paul Kantner, "In Time" and the post-nuclear closing epic "The House at Pooneil Corners", meant as a dark sequel to Kantner's earlier "The Ballad of You and Me and Pooneil." In concert, the band would sometimes combine the two "Pooneil" tracks together for a medley sequence lasting nearly 20 minutes. Kantner also contributed the heavy acid-rock of the title track, with lyrics borrowed verbatim from John Wyndham's sci-fi novel The Chrysalids, now repurposed as a revolutionary counterculture anthem. When the group appeared on The Smothers Brothers Comedy Hour to promote the song that November, Slick controversially wore blackface and gave the black power salute at the close of the performance.

Slick also contributed "Lather", a folky, reflective piece inspired by boyfriend Spencer Dryden's upcoming 30th birthday about what it meant to grow old in a youth-oriented movement, which also featured a "nose solo" by Gary Blackman. Dryden himself contributed the brief, eerie electronic piece "Chushingura" whose title and musical inspiration was taken from the soundtrack to the 1939 Japanese film. Guitarist Jorma Kaukonen wrote two tracks, "Star Track" and "Ice Cream Phoenix", the latter starting out as a ten-minute instrumental live jam but eventually pruned to three minutes with added lyrics. The group also covered David Crosby's "Triad", a controversial song about a ménage à trois that had been rejected by his band The Byrds the year prior; the Airplane gave it a soft acoustic arrangement featuring Slick on vocal lead. According to Slick, "I have a definite sympathy with that situation, although I could never pull off a ménage à trois myself. I have enough trouble with one-to-one relationships".

Stylistically the album was their most diverse to date, combining the hard rock and studio experimentation of After Bathing at Baxter's with the more concise pop songwriting acumen of Surrealistic Pillow. After the relative commercial failure of the previous album, the group were more cautious this time in choosing what to include. As Slick recalled, "if it worked, we put it on the album. If not, we left it on the floor of the control room. I guess after Baxter's we realized we couldn't afford the risks". Among the experimental outtakes rejected for the album were Dryden's "Ribump Ba Bap Dum Dum" and "The Saga of Sydney Spacepig" along with an avant-garde collaboration between Slick and Frank Zappa titled "Would You Like A Snack?", which were all later added as bonus tracks to the CD release. As a result, Crown of Creation was more tightly structured than their previous effort, while retaining a psychedelic feel. Several guest musicians were involved in the development of the album including David Crosby, Bill Goodwin, and Tim Davis.

== Title and artwork ==
The song "Crown of Creation" provided the album's title, which was taken with permission from John Wyndham's sci-fi novel The Chrysalids and refers to man as the "crown" or highest level of creation. The album cover artwork featured the band members' images duplicated in slightly different positions. In the background, there is a mushroom cloud from an atomic explosion courtesy of the USAF, which references the post-apocalyptic themes of the closing track "The House at Pooneil Corners". The design was produced by John Van Hamersveld in Los Angeles. The vinyl release included a "Brumus sheet", which offered song lyrics and credits along with an image of Robert F. Kennedy's dog, Brumus. The band had dined with RFK at his home in February 1968 after performing at a telethon he sponsored, and later attempted to perform a free show with The Grateful Dead at Speedway Meadows after his assassination, but were prevented from doing so by police.

== Release ==
Crown of Creation was released in August 1968 in the United States in stereo as RCA LSP-4058 and in mono as RCA LPM-4058. It would be the last Jefferson Airplane album to be released in mono and their second and final album to reach the Top Ten, peaking at No. 6. Thanks to the then-new FM radio, the band received airplay for lengthier album tracks which kept them relevant, especially in the counterculture of the US. However, the group continued to struggle on the singles charts as the follow up to "Greasy Heart", the politically tinged title track, fared better but still only reached No. 64.

When the band went on tour in Europe and America to promote the album that fall, many of the album's songs were initially included in the set list, including "Lather", "In Time", "Triad" and "If You Feel" but were dropped within weeks, never to be heard from again. However, "Star Track", "Crown Of Creation", "Greasy Heart" and "House At Pooneil Corners" stayed staples in their live shows through 1970.

An expanded edition of Crown of Creation was released on compact disc on August 11, 2003. Four bonus tracks are included, one of which is "Would You Like A Snack?", an avant-garde piece cowritten by Frank Zappa and Grace Slick. Other tracks include the mono single mix of "Share A Little Joke", the previously unreleased eight-minute song, "The Saga of Sydney Spacepig" and "Ribump Ba Bap Dum Dum", which is a combination of noises, sound effects, and pop culture catch phrases. Along with the four bonus tracks is a hidden track, an acoustic cover of Reverend Gary Davis' "Candy Man".

== Critical reception ==
Professional ratings
Review scores
Source	Rating
AllMusic	4/5 stars
The Daily Vault	A
Encyclopedia of Popular Music	5/5 stars
Rolling Stone	(neutral)

The album initially received a mixed review in Rolling Stone, whose Jim Miller opined that it "shows the group caught in the midst of a struggle between style and stylization, and the results are sometimes ambiguous." He praised the use of acoustic guitars on "In Time" and "Triad" but thought Slick's vocal phrasing on "Greasy Heart" was "eccentric" and labeled "The House at Pooneil Corners" a "noble failure." Cash Box said of "Greasy Heart" that it has a "potent throbbing rhythm, some outstanding guitar breaks and sharp vocal delivery."

Retrospective reviews have been warmer, with many critics naming it one of the band's best albums for managing to impeccably represent the transition in 1968 between the lingering acid euphoria of the previous year with themes of unease and revolution that would come to dominate 1969's Volunteers. Bruce Eder at AllMusic states that it is "deliberately more accessible musically than its predecessor, even as the playing became more bold and daring within more traditional song structures" while praising "If You Feel" as one of Balin's most heartfelt vocal performances and "Pooneil Corners" as the group firing on all cylinders. The Daily Vault's verdict is similarly effusive, gushing that the album was "almost the perfect release for 1968 and remains a wonderful snapshot of the era. The writing and musicianship, particularly the bass work of Jack Casady, was some of the best of the group's career and the decade." In Colin Larkin's All Time Top 1000 Albums, where it ranks at #591, he writes it is a "rich and varied collection showing off the different talents of the main songwriters."

Ultimate Classic Rock critic Michael Gallucci rated the title track as Jefferson Airplane's 8th best song, calling it "one of Jefferson Airplane's greatest group performances" and particularly praising guitarist Jorma Kaukonen's "scorching blues-inspired fills" and bassist Jack Casady's bass line.

== Track listing ==
Side one
No.	Title	Writer(s)	Length
1.	"Lather"	Grace Slick	2:55
2.	"In Time"	Paul Kantner, Marty Balin	4:07
3.	"Triad"	David Crosby	4:54
4.	"Star Track"	Jorma Kaukonen	3:09
5.	"Share a Little Joke"	Balin	3:04
6.	"Chushingura" (instrumental)	Spencer Dryden	1:17

Side two
No.	Title	Writer(s)	Length
1.	"If You Feel"	Balin, Gary Blackman	3:30
2.	"Crown of Creation" (lyric based on John Wyndham's "The Chrysalids")	Kantner	2:52
3.	"Ice Cream Phoenix"	Kaukonen, Charles Cockey	2:59
4.	"Greasy Heart"	Slick	3:25
5.	"The House at Pooneil Corners"	Kantner, Balin	5:46

August 19, 2003 CD bonus tracks
No.	Title	Writer(s)	Length
12.	"Ribump Ba Bap Dum Dum" (instrumental)	Dryden, William Goodwin	1:32
13.	"Would You Like a Snack?"	Frank Zappa, Slick	2:40
14.	"Share a Little Joke" (single version B-side RCA #9496)	Balin	3:09
15.	"The Saga of Sydney Spacepig"	Dryden	7:55
16.	"Candy Man" (hidden track)	Rev. Gary Davis	2:25

== Personnel ==
Jefferson Airplane

- Marty Balin – vocals, rhythm guitar
- Grace Slick – vocals, piano, organ
- Paul Kantner – rhythm guitar, vocals
- Jorma Kaukonen – lead guitar, electric chicken, vocals
- Jack Casady – bass guitar
- Spencer Dryden – drums, piano, organ, steel balls, vocals

Additional musicians

- Gary Blackman – nose solo on "Lather"
- Charles Cockey – guitar, vocals
- David Crosby – guitar
- Tim Davis – congas
- Bill Goodwin – talking drums
- Danny Woody – bongos
- Gene Twombly – sound effects
- Frank Zappa – musical director on "Would You Like a Snack?"
- Arthur Tripp – drums, percussion on "Would You Like a Snack?"
- Ian Underwood – piano, clarinet on "Would You Like a Snack?"
- Don Preston – keyboards on "Would You Like a Snack?"

Production

- Al Schmitt – producer
- Richie Schmitt – engineer
- Pat Ieraci – 8-Track
- Hiro – cover and back photography
- USAF – bomb photo
- J. Van Hamersveld – album design, art direction
- Bill Laudner – road manager
- Chick Casady – equipment manager
- Bill Thompson – manager

== Charts ==
Chart (1968–1969)	Peak position
Canada Top Albums/CDs (RPM)	14
US Billboard 200	6

== Certifications ==
Region	Certification	Certified units/sales
United States (RIAA)	Gold	500,000^{^}
^{^} Shipments figures based on certification alone.
