= Have You Seen Her Face =

- U.S. picture sleeve

Single by the Byrds

from the album Younger Than Yesterday
- B-side: "Don't Make Waves"
- Released: May 22, 1967
- Recorded: November 28 – December 1, 1966
- Studio: Columbia, Hollywood, California
- Genre: Folk rock; psychedelic rock; country rock; power pop
- Length: 2:25
- Label: Columbia
- Songwriter(s): Chris Hillman
- Producer(s): Gary Usher

The Byrds US singles chronology
"My Back Pages" (1967)	"Have You Seen Her Face" (1967)	"Lady Friend" (1967)

"Have You Seen Her Face" is a song by the American rock band the Byrds, written by the group's bass player Chris Hillman and included on their 1967 album Younger Than Yesterday.

== Composition ==
"Have You Seen Her Face" was written following a recording session for trumpet player Hugh Masekela, which Hillman attended in 1966. Byrds biographer Johnny Rogan has commented that the bassist blossomed as a songwriter during that year. On the Byrds' previous album, Fifth Dimension, Hillman's only songwriting contribution had been a shared writing credit for the instrumental "Captain Soul", but on Younger Than Yesterday he is credited as the sole songwriter of four tracks, as well as the co-writer of "So You Want to Be a Rock 'n' Roll Star" with Jim McGuinn.

Critics have made mention of the song's strident structure and melody, which was greatly influenced by the British Invasion groups of the mid-1960s and complemented by Hillman's melodic, Paul McCartney-esque bass playing. The song also features a faux country and western lead guitar solo played by McGuinn on rhythm guitarist David Crosby's Gretsch Country Gentleman guitar.

== Release and reception ==
"Have You Seen Her Face" was released as the third single to be taken from the Byrds' Younger Than Yesterday album on May 22, 1967. It reached number 74 on the Billboard Hot 100. The song was issued as a single in most international markets, but not in the United Kingdom.

Despite its relatively poor showing on the U.S. charts, critical reaction to the song was positive, with Record World describing it as a "pretty contemporary love song" and Billboard magazine commenting that "the quartet has a strong commercial entry in this easy-beat folk-rocker with a compelling lyric." Cash Box called it "a pulsing, thumping, medium-soft-rock excursion" that could be chart-bound. Record World called it a "pretty contemporary love song [that] deserves to hit high chart slots."

Thomas Ward of the Allmusic website has described the song as "magnificent" and "one of the Byrds' great songs." Ward also commented that "the song distills the groups' many influences, from Indian music (in McGuinn's wondrous guitar solo) to folk to rock and roll." Ward concluded his review by stating that "Have You Seen Her Face" was "one of the most outstanding songs of the period, by anyone."

The Byrds performed "Have You Seen Her Face" on the television programs The Tonight Show Starring Johnny Carson and American Bandstand, as well as featuring it in their performance at the Monterey Pop Festival. The Byrds' performance of the song at Monterey is included on the 1992 The Monterey International Pop Festival CD box set.

A remixed and extended version of the song, lasting 2:40 and featuring a longer fade-out than the original album and single version, was released on The Byrds box set in 1990. This extended version was later incorporated into the 1996 Columbia/Legacy reissue of the Younger Than Yesterday album, replacing the original 2:25 version as the second track on the album.

== Cover versions ==
"Have You Seen Her Face" was covered by Southern Culture on the Skids on their 2007 album Countrypolitan Favorites and Marshall Crenshaw also included a version of the song on his Live...My Truck Is My Home album. Additionally, a version of the song by the underground indie rock band Sex Clark Five was included as a bonus track on the 1996 reissue of their Strum and Drum! album.
