= Gene Clark discography =

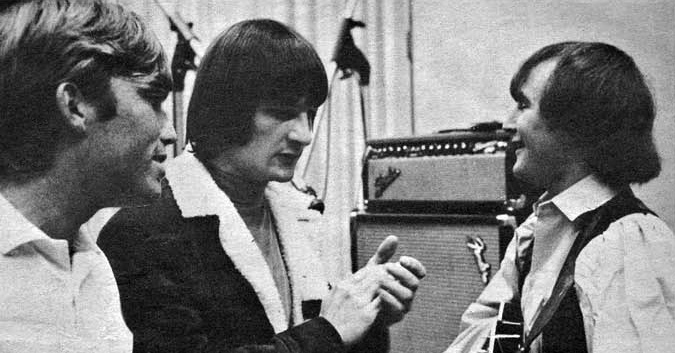
- Terry Melcher (left), Gene Clark (center), and David Crosby (right) in the recording studio.
- Studio albums: 7
- EPs: 2
- Soundtrack albums: 1
- Live albums: 4
- Compilation albums: 11
- Tribute albums: 1
- Singles: 10
- Music videos: 1

Gene Clark was an American singer-songwriter and founding member of the Byrds. His discography consists of 7 studio albums, 4 live albums, 11 compilations, 2 EPs, and 10 singles.

== Studio albums ==
- Gene Clark with the Gosdin Brothers (Columbia, February 1967) – reissued in 1991 as Echoes
- White Light aka Gene Clark (A&M, August 1971)
- Roadmaster (A&M, January 1973)
- No Other (Asylum, September 1974)
- Two Sides to Every Story (RSO, February 1977)
- Firebyrd (Takoma, November 1984) – reissued in 1995 as This Byrd Has Flown by Edsel Records with additional tracks
- So Rebellious a Lover (Rhino, April 1987) – with Carla Olson

=== As a member of Dillard & Clark ===
- The Fantastic Expedition of Dillard & Clark (A&M, October 1968)
- Through the Morning Through the Night (A&M, September 1969)

=== As a member of McGuinn, Clark & Hillman ===
- McGuinn, Clark & Hillman (Capitol, January 1979)
- City (Capitol, January 1980)

== Live albums ==
- Silhouetted in Light (recorded February 3, 1990) (Demon, February 1992) – with Carla Olson
- In Concert (recorded 1988–1990) (Collectors' Choice Music, August 2007) – with Carla Olson
- Silverado '75 - Live & Unreleased (recorded February 19, 1975) (Collectors' Choice Music, April 2008)
- Gene Clark/The Firebyrds - Live at The Rockinghorse Saloon (recorded January 13, 1985) (Keyhole, 2015)

== Compilations ==
- Collector's Series: Early L.A. Sessions (Columbia, June 1972)
- Echoes (Columbia/Legacy, September 1991) – collects Gene Clark with the Gosdin Brothers with additional early material
- American Dreamer 1964–1974 (Raven, September 1993) – best of compilation
- Flying High (A&M, September 1998) – anthology
- Gypsy Angel - The Gene Clark Demos (1983-1990) (Evangeline, October 2001)
- Under the Silvery Moon (Delta Deluxe, September 2003) – collection of previously unreleased mid-1980s material
- Set You Free: Gene Clark in the Byrds 1964–1973 (Raven, November 2004) – selected recordings with the Byrds
- Here Tonight: The White Light Demos (Omnivore Recordings/A&M, March 2013) – selected demos
- The Lost Studio Sessions 1964–1982 (Sierra, December 2016) – unreleased recordings
- Gene Clark Sings for You (Omnivore Recordings, June 2018) – publishing demos and unreleased tracks recorded with the Rose Garden
- Collected (Music on CD/Music on Vinyl, December 2021) – compilation of tracks spanning Clark's entire career

== Singles ==
- "Echoes" / "I Found You" (Columbia, December 1966)
- "So You Say You Lost Your Baby" / "Is Yours Is Mine" (Columbia, April 1967)
- "Train Leaves Here This Mornin'" / "Out On the Side" (A&M, 1968, with Doug Dillard)
- "Why Not Your Baby" / "The Radio Song" (A&M, 1969, with Doug Dillard)
- "Don't Be Cruel" / "Lyin' Down the Middle" (A&M, 1969, with Doug Dillard)
- "Don't Let Me Down" / "Rocky Top" (A&M, 1970, with Doug Dillard)
- "No Other" / "The True One" (Asylum, January 1975)
- "Life's Greatest Fool" / "From a Silver Phial" (Asylum, March 1975)
- "Home Run King" / "Lonely Saturday" (RSO, January 1977)
- Hugo Montenegro – "Garrote" / Gene Clark – "American Dreamer" (Red Earth split single, 1977)
- Gene Clark – "Gypsy Rider" / The Seers – "Flyaway" (Bucketfull of Brains split single, 1988)

Posthumously released

- "Only Colombe" / "The French Girl" (Sundazed, May 2008)
- "One in a Hundred" / "She's the Kind of Girl" (Sundazed, April 2012)
- The Lost Studio Sessions: The Folk Den (Sierra, December 2016) – "All for Him (Or Her)" / "Why Can't I Have Her Back Again"

== EPs ==
- Sing 3 Songs by The Byrds (Demon, February 1992) – with Carla Olson – "I'll Feel a Whole Lot Better" / "Set You Free This Time" / "She Don't Care About Time"
- The Lost Studio Sessions Bonus Acoustic CD (Sierra, December 2016) – "The Virgin" / "She's the Kind of Girl" / "1975" / "One in a Hundred"
- Back Street Mirror - Record Store Day Vinyl EP (Entrée, April 21, 2018) – "Back Street Mirror", "Don't Let It Fall Through", "Yesterday, Am I Right", "If I Hang Around", "She Told Me", "That's What You Want"

== As a member of The Byrds ==
- Mr. Tambourine Man (Columbia, June 1965)
- Turn! Turn! Turn! (Columbia, December 1965)
- Fifth Dimension (Columbia, July 1966)
- Preflyte (Together, July 1969) - compilation of early previously unreleased songs and demos
- Byrds (Asylum, March 1973)

== Soundtracks ==
- Marijuana (1968)
  - Original score
- The American Dreamer (1971)
  - Two songs contributed: "American Dreamer" and "Outlaw Song"

== Tributes ==
- 2000: various artists - Full Circle: A Tribute to Gene Clark (Not Lame)

== As composer ==
- 1967: The Barracudas - A Plane View Of The Barracudas (Justice) - track 8, "Feel A Whole Lot Better"
- 1968: The Rose Garden - The Rose Garden (ATCO) - track 8, "Till Today" and track 10, "Long Time"
- 1969: Santo & Johnny - The Best That Could Happen (Imperial Records) - track 1, "You Showed Me" (co-written with Roger McGuinn)
- 1970: Doug Dillard - The Banjo Album (Together Records) - track 11, "With Care From Someone" (co-written with Doug Dillard and Bernie Leadon)
- 1970: Linda Ronstadt - Silk Purse (Capitol) - track 9, "He Darked the Sun" (co-written with Bernie Leadon)
- 1971: The Flying Burrito Brothers - The Flying Burrito Bros (A&M) - track 4, "Tried So Hard"; track 12, "Here Tonight" (CD bonus track)
- 1971: Leo Kottke - Mudlark (Capitol) - track 2, "Eight Miles High" (co-written with Roger McGuinn and David Crosby)
- 1972: Eagles - Eagles (Asylum) - track 6, "Train Leaves Here This Morning" (co-written with Bernie Leadon)
- 1975: Pure Prairie League - Two Lane Highway (RCA Victor) - track 5, "Kansas City Southern"
- 1976: Don Nix - Gone Too Long (Cream Records) - track 2, "Feel A Whole Lot Better"
- 1977: Dillard / Hartford / Dillard - Glitter Grass From The Nashwood Hollyville Strings (Flying Fish) - track 1, "Don't Come Rollin'" (co-written with Doug Dillard and Bernie Leadon)
- 1977: Bobbi Humphrey - Tailor Made (Epic) - track 5, "Jealousy" (co-written with Skip Scarborough)
- 1978: Bobby Bare - Sleeper Wherever I Fall (Columbia) - track 8, I'll Feel a Whole Lot Better
- 1978: Flamin' Groovies - Flamin' Groovies Now (Sire) - track 1, "I'll Feel A Whole Lot Better"
- 1980: Roxy Music - Flesh + Blood (Polydor) - track 7, "Eight Miles High" (co-written with Roger McGuinn and David Crosby)
- 1986: This Mortal Coil - Filigree & Shadow (4AD / Warner Bros.) - track 10, "Strength of Strings"
- 1989: Tom Petty - Full Moon Fever (MCA) - track 6, Feel A Whole Lot Better
- 1990: Yo La Tengo - Fakebook (Bar/None) - track 9, "Tried So Hard"
- 1991: This Mortal Coil - Blood (4AD) - track 4, "With Tomorrow" (co-written with Jesse Ed Davis)
- 1994: Velvet Crush - Teenage Symphonies To God (Epic) - track 3, "Why Not Your Baby"
- 1996: The Lightning Seeds - Dizzy Heights (Epic) - track 10, "You Showed Me" (co-written with Roger McGuinn)
- 2000: Western Electric - Western Electric (Munich / Glitterhouse) - track 10, "Straight From The Heart"
- 2002: Death In Vegas - Scorpio Rising (Concrete) - track 8, "So You Say You Lost Your Baby"
- 2004: Arthur Dodge & The Horsefeathers - Room #4 (Remedy) - track 9, "Why Not Your Baby"
- 2007: Robert Plant and Alison Krauss - Raising Sand - track 4, "Polly Come Home"; track 6, "Through The Morning, Through The Night"
- 2013: Carla Olson - Have Harmony, Will Travel (Busted Flat) - track 6, "She Don't Care About Time"
- 2016: John McEuen - Made in Brooklyn (Chesky) - track 4, "She Darked the Sun" (co-written with Bernie Leadon)

== Also appears on ==
- 1973: Roger McGuinn - Roger McGuinn (Columbia) - vocals on track 2, "My New Woman"

== Sources ==
- Gene Clark biography at Country Music Television
- Gene Clark discography at Byrds Flyght
- Gene Clark at AllMusic
- Gene Clark discography at Discogs
