= Bernie Leadon discography =

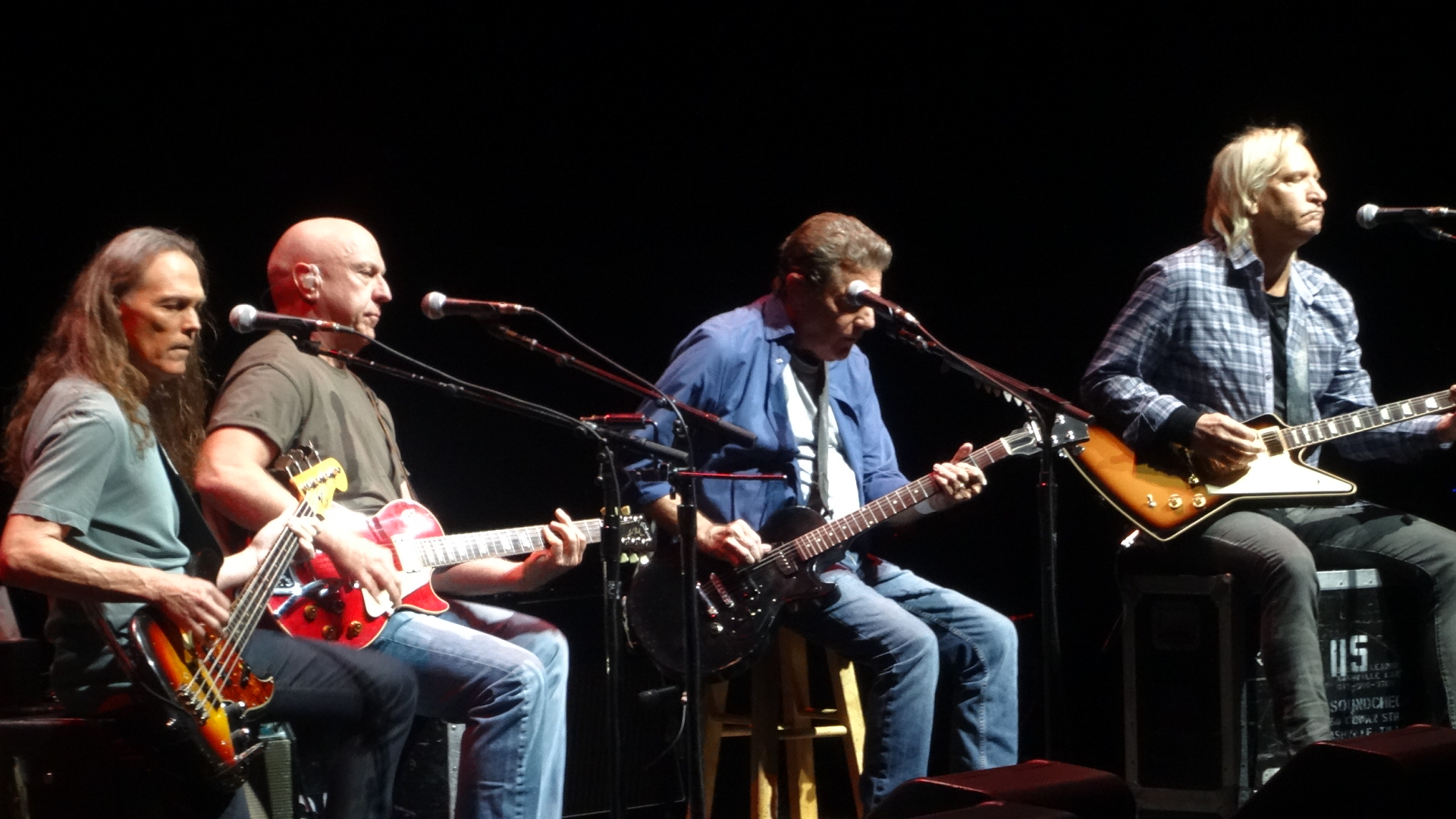
- Bernie Leadon (second from left) on the "History of the Eagles" tour in Grand Rapids MI, September 2014.

Bernie Leadon is an American musician and songwriter. In addition to his solo album and recordings with Eagles, Hearts & Flowers, Dillard & Clark, Linda Ronstadt & the Corvettes and The Flying Burrito Brothers, he has been featured as a performer and composer on many albums by other artists.

== Solo Studio albums ==
- 1977: Natural Progressions - as The Bernie Leadon-Michael Georgiades Band (Asylum)
- 2004: Mirror (Really Small Entertainment)
- 2025: Too Late To Be Cool (Straight Wire)

== Band member ==
As a member of The Maundy Quintet

- 1967: "2's Better Than 3" / "I'm Not Alone" (Paris Tower)

As a member of Hearts & Flowers

- 1968: Of Horses, Kids and Forgotten Women (Capitol)

As a member of Dillard & Clark

- 1968: The Fantastic Expedition of Dillard & Clark (A&M)
- 1969: Through the Morning, Through the Night (A&M)

As a member of Linda Ronstadt & the Corvettes

- 1973: Music from Free Creek (Charisma) - recorded 1969

As a member of The Flying Burrito Brothers

- 1970: Burrito Deluxe (A&M)
- 1971: The Flying Burrito Bros (A&M)

As a member of Eagles

- 1972: Eagles - (Asylum)
- 1973: Desperado (Asylum)
- 1974: On the Border (Asylum)
- 1975: One of These Nights (Asylum)

As a member of Ever Call Ready

- 1985: Ever Call Ready (Maranatha! / A&M)

== Song writer ==
- 1968: Dillard and Clark - "She Darked The Sun" - Written by Bernie Leadon and Gene Clark
- 1968: Dillard and Clark - "Don't Come Rollin' " - Written by Bernie Leadon, Doug Dillard and Gene Clark
- 1968: Dillard and Clark - "Train Leaves Here This Mornin' " - Written by Bernie Leadon and Gene Clark
- 1968: Dillard and Clark - "With Care From Someone" - Written by Bernie Leadon, Doug Dillard and Gene Clark
- 1968: Dillard and Clark - "The Radio Song" - Written by Bernie Leadon and Gene Clark
- 1968: Dillard and Clark - "In The Plan" - Written by Bernie Leadon, Doug Dillard and Gene Clark
- 1968: Dillard and Clark - "Something's Wrong" - Written by Bernie Leadon and Gene Clark
- 1969: Free Creek/Linda Ronstadt - "She Darked The Sun" - Written by Bernie Leadon and Gene Clark, released in 1973
- 1970: Linda Ronstadt - "She Darked The Sun" - Written by Bernie Leadon and Gene Clark
- 1970: The Flying Burrito Brothers - "Man In The Fog" - Written by Bernie Leadon and Gram Parsons
- 1970: The Flying Burrito Brothers - "Older Guys" - Written by Bernie Leadon, Chris Hillman and Gram Parsons
- 1970: The Flying Burrito Brothers - "God's Own Singer" - Written by Bernie Leadon
- 1972: The Eagles - "Witchy Woman" - Written by Bernie Leadon and Don Henley
- 1972: The Eagles - "Train Leaves Here This Morning" - Written by Bernie Leadon and Gene Clark
- 1972: The Eagles - "Earlybird" - Written by Bernie Leadon and Randy Meisner
- 1973: The Eagles - "Twenty-One" - Written by Bernie Leadon
- 1973: The Eagles - "Saturday Night" - Written by Bernie Leadon, Don Henley, Glenn Frey and Randy Meisner
- 1973: The Eagles - "Bitter Creek" - Written by Bernie Leadon
- 1974 - The Eagles - "My Man" - Written by Bernie Leadon
- 1974 - The Eagles - "On The Border" - Written by Bernie Leadon, Don Henley and Glenn Frey
- 1975 - The Eagles - "Hollywood Waltz" - Written by Bernie Leadon, Don Henley, Glenn Frey and Tom Leadon
- 1975 - The Eagles - "Journey Of The Sorcerer" - Written by Bernie Leadon
- 1975 - The Eagles - "I Wish You Peace" - Written by Bernie Leadon and Patti Davis
- 1977 - The Bernie Leadon - Michael Georgiades Band - "How Can You Live Without Love?" - Written by Bernie Leadon
- 1977 - The Bernie Leadon - Michael Georgiades Band - "As Time Goes On" - Written by Bernie Leadon
- 1977 - The Bernie Leadon - Michael Georgiades Band - "The Sparrow" - Written by Bernie Leadon
- 1977 - The Bernie Leadon - Michael Georgiades Band - "Glass Off" - Written by Bernie Leadon
- 2004 - Bernie Leadon - "Vile And A Profane Man" - Written by Bernie Leadon
- 2004 - Bernie Leadon - "Volcano" - Written by Bernie Leadon
- 2004 - Bernie Leadon - "Center Of The Universe" - Written by Bernie Leadon
- 2004 - Bernie Leadon - "What Do I Owe" - Written by Bernie Leadon
- 2004 - Bernie Leadon (feat Emmylou Harris) - "Backup Plan" - Written by Bernie Leadon
- 2004 - Bernie Leadon - "Everybody Want" - Written by Bernie Leadon
- 2004 - Bernie Leadon - "Sears And Roebuck Catalog" - Written by Bernie Leadon
- 2004 - Bernie Leadon - "Rich Life" - Written by Bernie Leadon
- 2004 - Bernie Leadon - "Hey Now Now" - Written by Bernie Leadon
- 2004 - Bernie Leadon (feat Emmylou Harris) - "God Ain't Done With Me Yet" - Written by Bernie Leadon
- 2025 - Bernie Leadon - "Zero Sum Game" - Written by Bernie Leadon
- 2025 - Bernie Leadon - "Telescope" - Written by Bernie Leadon
- 2025 - Bernie Leadon - "Just A Little" - Written by Bernie Leadon
- 2025 - Bernie Leadon - "Take It As It Comes" - Written by Bernie Leadon
- 2025 - Bernie Leadon - "Everyone's Quirky" - Written by Bernie Leadon
- 2025 - Bernie Leadon - "Go On Down To Mobile" - Written by Bernie Leadon
- 2025 - Bernie Leadon - "Mama Didn't Raise No Fool" - Written by Bernie Leadon
- 2025 - Bernie Leadon - "Too Late To Be Cool" - Written by Bernie Leadon
- 2025 - Bernie Leadon - "Fathom" - Written by Bernie Leadon
- 2025 - Bernie Leadon - "Coast Highway" - Written by Bernie Leadon
- 2025 - Bernie Leadon - "Too Many Memories" - Written by Bernie Leadon

== Session work ==
=== 1968 - 1979 ===
- 1968: Nitty Gritty Dirt Band - Rare Junk (Liberty Records) - guitar
- 1969: Buzz Clifford - See Your Way Clear (Dot) - resonator guitar
- 1969: Steve Young - Rock Salt & Nails (A&M) - guitar
- 1970: Bob Gibson - Bob Gibson (Capitol) - guitar
- 1970: Douglas Dillard - The Banjo Album (Together) - guitar, writer
- 1970: Hedge & Donna Capers - Special Circumstances (Capitol) - resonator guitar, acoustic guitar
- 1971: Barry McGuire and the Doctor (Eric Hord) - Barry McGuire & The Doctor (A&M) - guitar
- 1971: Bob Lind - Since There Were Circles (Capitol) - lead guitar
- 1971: Linda Ronstadt - Linda Ronstadt - guitar, backing vocals
- 1971: Paul Siebel - Jack-Knife Gypsy (Elektra) - guitar
- 1972: Rita Coolidge - The Lady's Not for Sale (A&M) - guitar
- 1972: Rick Roberts - Windmills (A&M) - vocals, guitar, banjo
- 1973: Gene Clark - Roadmaster (Ariola Records) electric guitar on 3 - Here Tonight
- 1973: Gram Parsons - Sleepless Nights (A&M, released in 1976) - acoustic guitar
- 1974: Gram Parsons - Grievous Angel (Reprise) - guitar (acoustic, electric, resonator)
- 1974: Randy Newman - Good Old Boys (Reprise) - vocals
- 1975: Andy Fairweather Low - La Booga Rooga (A&M) - banjo, guitar
- 1975: Emmylou Harris - Pieces of the Sky (Reprise) - banjo, resonator guitar, acoustic guitar, bass, vocals
- 1975: Emmylou Harris - Elite Hotel (Reprise) - acoustic guitar, vocals
- 1975: Danny O'Keefe - So Long Harry Truman (Atlantic) - vocals
- 1976: Chris Hillman - Slippin' Away (Asylum) - guitar, vocals on track 10, "(Take Me in Your) Lifeboat"
- 1976: Andy Fairweather Low - Be Bop 'N' Holla (A&M) - guitar (acoustic, electric)
- 1976: David Bromberg - How Late'll Ya Play 'Til? (Fantasy) - guitar
- 1977: Helen Reddy - Ear Candy (Capitol) - vocals
- 1978: various artists - White Mansions (A Tale from the American Civil War 1861-1865) (A&M) - guitar (acoustic, electric, resonator), banjo, mandolin, pedal steel, vocals

=== 1980 - 1989 ===
- 1980: various artists - The Legend of Jesse James (A&M) - guitar, banjo
- 1981: Chi Coltrane - Silk & Steel (CBS) - acoustic guitar
- 1982: Teresa Brewer - In London (Signature) - track 7, "Saturday Night" (co-written with Don Henley, Glenn Frey, and Randy Meisner)
- 1982: Chris Hillman - Morning Sky (Sugar Hill Records) - banjo on track 2, "The Taker"
- 1982: Harry Browning and Laury Boone - Sweet Harmony (Lamb & Lion) - banjo
- 1984: Chris Hillman - Desert Rose (Sugar Hill) - vocals, guitar (acoustic, electric), banjo, mandora, fiddle
- 1984: Stephen Stills - Right by You (Atlantic) - guitar, vocals
- 1987: Bobby Durham - Where I Grew Up (HighTone) - guitar
- 1987: Helen Watson - Blue Slipper (Hit Or Miss) - guitar
- 1988: Bob Neuwirth - Back to the Front (Gold Castle Records) - resonator guitar, banjo, mandolin
- 1988: John Hiatt - Slow Turning (A&M) - mandocello, guitar
- 1988: various artists - Way Down Deep In My Soul (Sugar Hill) - banjo, vocals on track 9, "Turn Your Radio On"
- 1989: Alabama - Southern Star (RCA) - acoustic guitar, banjo, mandolin
- 1989: Green On Red - This Time Around (Off-Beat Records) - mandolin
- 1989: Helen Watson - The Weather Inside (Hit Or Miss) - mandolin on track 8, "Dangerous Daybreak"
- 1989: Nanci Griffith - Storms (MCA) - guitar (acoustic, electric)
- 1989: Nitty Gritty Dirt Band - Will the Circle Be Unbroken: Volume Two (Universal) - banjo

=== 1990 - 1999 ===
- 1990: Alabama - Pass It On Down (BMG) - acoustic guitar, banjo
- 1990: Kenny Rogers - Love Is Strange (Reprise) - acoustic guitar, mandola, mandolin
- 1990: Matraca Berg - Lying to the Moon (RCA) - guitar, banjo
- 1991: Bashung - Osez Joséphine (Barclay) - guitar (acoustic, electric), mandolin
- 1991: Hank Williams, Jr. - Pure Hank (Warner Bros.) - mandolin
- 1991: Kelly Willis - Bang Bang (MCA) - guitar (acoustic, electric)
- 1991: Marty Balin - Better Generation (GWE) - mandola
- 1991: The Remingtons - Blue Frontier (RCA Victor) - acoustic guitar, tiple, banjo, mandolin
- 1991: Travis Tritt - It's All About to Change (Warner Bros.) - guitar (acoustic, electric), mandocello, mandola
- 1992: Alabama - American Pride (RCA Victor) - banjo, guitar, mandolin
- 1992: Branson Brothers - Heartmender (Warner Bros.) - acoustic guitar, banjo, mandola, mandolin, mandora
- 1992: Kathy Mattea - Lonesome Standard Time (Universal / Mercury) - guitar (acoustic, electric)
- 1992: Robert Ellis Orrall - Flying Colors (RCA) - acoustic guitar
- 1992: Ronna Reeves - The More I Learn (Polygram / Mercury) - acoustic guitar, tiple
- 1992: Ronna Reeves - What Comes Naturally (Mercury) - guitar, mandolin
- 1992: Michelle Shocked - Arkansas Traveler (Mercury) - mandolin, guitar, banjo
- 1992: Restless Heart - Big Iron Horses (RCA) - banjo, writing
- 1993: Alabama - Cheap Seats (RCA) - guitar, banjo
- 1993: David Crosby - Thousand Roads (Atlantic) - guitar (acoustic, electric)
- 1993: Patsy Moore - The Flower Child's Guide to Love & Fashion (Warner Alliance) - acoustic guitar, banjo
- 1993: Mitch Malloy - Ceilings & Walls (RCA) - guitar
- 1993: The Remingtons - Aim for the Heart (RCA / BNA) - acoustic guitar
- 1994: Bob Woodruff - Dreams and Saturday Nights (Asylum / Elektra) - banjo
- 1994: Stevie Nicks - Street Angel (Modern) - backing vocals, cello, guitar, mandocello, mandolin
- 1995: Freelight - Freelight (San Francisco Sound) - acoustic guitar, banjo
- 1995: Pam Tillis - All of This Love (Arista) - banjo
- 1997: Amazing Rhythm Aces - Ride Again (Breaker) - guitar, banjo, mandolin
- 1998: Linda Ronstadt - We Ran (Elektra) - guitar (acoustic, electric), mandocello, vocals
- 1998: Mancy A'lan Kane - Paper Moon (Atlantic) - acoustic guitar
- 1999: Mary McCaslin - Rain: The Lost Album (Bear Family, release of album recorded 1968) - guitar
- 1999: Linda Ronstadt and Emmylou Harris - Western Wall: The Tucson Sessions (Asylum) - guitar (acoustic, electric, 12-string), mandolin, bass, guitarron, mandocello

=== 2000 - present ===
- 2003: Gene Clark - No Other (Asylum) - track 9, "Train Leaves Here This Morning" (bonus track from of 1974 album)
- 2003: Emmylou Harris - Stumble into Grace (Nonesuch) - electric guitar
- 2003: The Jayhawks - Rainy Day Music (American Recordings / Lost Highway) - banjo on track 2, "Tailspin"
- 2014: John Cowan - Sixty (Compass) - banjo
- 2015: Ethan Johns with the Black Eyed Dogs - Silver Liner (Three Crows / Caroline) - vocals

== As composer ==
- 1972: Johnny Rivers - L.A. Reggae (United Artists) - track 11, "Life Is a Game" (co-written with Michael Georgiades)
- 1979: Douglas Adams - The Hitch-Hiker's Guide to the Galaxy (Original) - track A1, "Journey of the Sorcerer"; track D8, "Journey's End (Journey of the Sorcerer)"
- 1991: Devonsquare - Bye Bye Route 66 (Atlantic) - track 5, "Diamond Days" (co-written with Tom Dean)
- 1992: Joy Lynn White - Between Midnight & Hindsight (Columbia) - track 9, "Hey Hey Mama" (co-written with Jimmy Davis)
- 1996: Crystal Bernard - Girl Next Door (River North / A&M) - track 8, "Too Far This Time" (co-written with David Rhyne and Vaughan Penn)

== As producer ==
- 1975: David Bromberg - Midnight On The Water (Columbia) - Producer: Bernie Leadon
- 1992: Michelle Shocked - Arkansas Traveler (Mercury Records) - Producers: Bernie Leadon, Hugh Padgham, Michelle Shocked and Don Was
- 1998: Tiny Town - Tiny Town (Atlantic / Pioneer) - Producer: Bernie Leadon
- 1998: Full on the Mouth - Collide (Atlantic) - Producer: Bernie Leadon
- 1998: CeCe Winans - Everlasting Love (Atlantic / Pioneer) - Executive Producer: Bernie Leadon
- 2001: Judson Spence - I Guess I Love It (Pioneer) - Producer: Bernie Leadon
- 2001: Full on the Mouth - People Mover (Pioneer) - Producer: Bernie Leadon

== Sources ==
- Bernie Leadon Online
- Bernie Leadon at AllMusic
- Bernie Leadon discography at Discogs
