= Kansas City Southern =

Kansas City Southern may refer to:

- Kansas City Southern Railway
- Kansas City Southern (company), the parent company of the railway
- "Kansas City Southern", a song by Dillard & Clark from the album Through the Morning, Through the Night
