= No Other =

Studio album by Gene Clark
- Released: September 1974
- Recorded: April–May 1974
- Studios: The Village Recorder, West Los Angeles, California
- Genres: Country rock; R&B; gospel
- Length: 43:07
- Label: Asylum
- Producer: Thomas Jefferson Kaye

Gene Clark chronology
| Roadmaster (1973) | No Other (1974) | Two Sides to Every Story (1977) |

Singles from No Other
- 1. "No Other" Released: January 1975; 2. "Life's Greatest Fool" Released: March 1975

No Other is the fourth solo studio album by American singer-songwriter Gene Clark. Released in September 1974, (Note: An exact release date has not yet been definitively found. Some sources have stated it was September 1, but according to production notes included with the book in the 2019 4AD deluxe edition, the first mastering of No Other was completed on August 28, 1974. Given the standard length of time from mastering to pressing and availability, this places the release date more likely towards the middle or end of September. As stated on pg. 79 in the deluxe edition book, the album was released in Germany on October 11, 1974, and in the United Kingdom in February 1975.) it was largely ignored or lambasted by critics and was a commercial failure; the studio time and cost were seen as excessive and indulgent. The record label, Asylum Records, did not promote the album, and by 1976 had deleted it from their catalog. Clark never recovered from the failure of the album. It has since been positively reappraised.

Just prior to Clark's death in 1991, No Other was reissued in its entirety on CD. In 1993, an Australian CD compilation entitled American Dreamer 1964–1974 included two songs from No Other, while in 1998, a double disc compilation, Flying High, was released with three songs from No Other. Then in the early 2000s, No Other was reissued a second time in its entirety to positive critical reappraisal; publications have referred to it as "a lost masterpiece" and "one of the greatest albums ever made." A highly praised, newly remastered reissue campaign by 4AD was launched on November 8, 2019, with the album reissued as a standard CD, vinyl LP, deluxe double-CD set, and an expansive super deluxe box set with three SACDs, one Blu-ray disc, a silver-colored LP, and commemorative 80-page book.

== Background ==
In late 1972, Clark was invited to join a reunion of the original Byrds line-up on Asylum Records. Although nominally organized and produced by David Crosby, the resulting album evolved into an inadvertent showcase for Clark, who sang lead on two Neil Young covers and two original songs. By the strength of his contributions to the album, Clark was signed to Asylum as a solo artist by David Geffen.

While preparing to record, Clark briefly joined the backing group of former Byrds colleague Roger McGuinn; the two even shared a home together during the period in the Hollywood Hills. During an engagement at The Troubadour in Los Angeles with McGuinn, he introduced a song that would remain in his repertoire for the rest of his career, "Silver Raven"; it would be recorded in an arrangement featuring longtime Clark collaborator Jesse Ed Davis and L.A. session player Danny Kortchmar on No Other. Of the song's composition, Clark said in a 1976 interview: "It actually came about from a news story that was about some satellite, or something, they had discovered. They said they couldn't figure out where it came from. It was beyond our solar system. They were getting signals from it that they said were about 100 years ahead of our technology".

== Production ==
"The whole album was written when I had a house overlooking the Pacific Ocean in Northern California. I would just sit in the living room, which had a huge bay window, and stare at the ocean for hours at a time. I would have a pen and paper there, and a guitar or piano, and pretty soon a thought would come and I'd write it down or put it on tape. In most instances, after a day of meditation looking at something which is a very natural force, I'd come up with something."

— Gene Clark, on the gestation of No Other.

Retreating to his coastal home in Mendocino, Clark began to compose songs for his new album for over a year. Contrary to rumors that many of the album's songs were conceived under the influence of mescaline and other drugs, Clark's wife Carlie stated in Mr. Tambourine Man: The Story of the Byrds' Gene Clark that he was sober throughout the Mendocino years and was disinclined to experiment for the sake of his children. Living up to the "hillbilly Shakespeare" moniker accorded him by later bandmate John York, the weighty and ponderous nature of most of his lyrics from the period were drawn from his Christian upbringing and discussions regarding the oeuvre of Carlos Castaneda, Theosophy and Zen with his wife and friends, most notably David Carradine and Dennis Hopper.

Clark told Zigzag in 1977 that he was strongly influenced by Stevie Wonder's 1973 album Innervisions and The Rolling Stones' 1973 album Goats Head Soup. He said, "When I was writing No Other I concentrated on those albums a lot, and was very inspired by the direction of them...which is ironic, because Innervisions is a very climbing, spiritual thing, while Goats Head Soup has connotations of the lower forces as well. But somehow the joining of the two gave me a place to go with No Other, and I wanted it to go in a powerful direction". Clark, in a 1984 interview, said, "It was during a time when I felt like I was doing a lot of soul-searching."

Entering the studio in April 1974, he was paired with producer Thomas Jefferson Kaye, who would become Clark's primary artistic collaborator for the next fifteen years. Earlier in the year, Kaye had accumulated tens of thousands of dollars in cost overruns on Bob Neuwirth's solo debut, which failed to dent the charts. Kaye continued that pattern with No Other. Most sessions were conducted in Los Angeles and featured the cream of the era's session musicians: Korchmar, keyboardist Craig Doerge, bassist Leland Sklar, and drummer Russ Kunkel of The Section; guitarist Jesse Ed Davis; noted progressive bluegrass fiddler Richard Greene; former Blues Image percussionist Joe Lala; keyboardist and future Jimmy Buffett bandleader Michael Utley; Allman Brothers Band percussionist Butch Trucks; pedal steel guitarist and longtime Neil Young collaborator Ben Keith; (Note: Ben Keith's contributions had been previously uncredited until the 2019 reissue.) backup vocalists Clydie King, Claudia Lennear, Venetta Fields and Cindy Bullens; and former Byrd Chris Hillman.

The plaintive country-folk sounds of White Light and Roadmaster were replaced by intricate vocal harmonies and heavily overdubbed, vertiginous arrangements in Kaye's "answer to Brian Wilson and Phil Spector as a producer". Additionally, there was a pronounced R&B/funk feel to the title track, which has often been attributed to the presence of Sly Stone at some of the sessions. According to John Einarson's Mr. Tambourine Man, all of the assembled musicians were impressed by Clark's perfectionism and genial, humble attitude.

Initially, Carlie Clark and the children temporarily relocated with him to Los Angeles, in the hope that the family routine of Mendocino could be preserved. However, it was not long before Clark reacquainted himself with L.A.'s party circuit and the latest fashionable drug—cocaine. After his disgusted wife moved the family back to northern California, Clark roomed with old friend and bandmate Doug Dillard in the Hollywood Hills; "Lady of the North", the album's closer, was written by the twosome in a cocaine haze, their final collaboration on a song.

For years, rumors circulated that only half of an intended double album had been recorded, with Geffen balking at the excessive cost that would entail. This was corroborated by Clark in a 1976 interview. According to Kaye in Mr. Tambourine Man, 13 or 14 songs had been demoed with acoustic guitar at early sessions but only nine were recorded with a full band. "Train Leaves Here This Morning", a rerecording of a song first released on The Fantastic Expedition of Dillard & Clark, was omitted from the final album. The rumor of a double album, however, was debunked when the album's sessions were reassessed for its 2019 reissue.

== Release ==
No Other was delivered to Asylum Records in the summer of 1974. Recording costs had ballooned to over $100,000 (equivalent to ~$525,000 in 2018), a considerable investment in a performer who had seen his last Top 40 hit eight years earlier. (Note: "You Showed Me", an early Byrds composition by Clark and McGuinn, was later covered by The Turtles; their rendition peaked at No. 6 in 1969.) Geffen was further dismayed by the dearth of potential hits and the uncommercial nature of the material. Kaye said, "I got flak from David Geffen about 'how come there are only eight songs on the record after they spent all this money?' They were eight great songs and that was it. We were trying to make a real piece of art and we thought that David Geffen, being a really artsy guy, would get it. But he didn't. I think it went over his head."

Released in September 1974, (Note: Some sources cite December 1974 as the release date, but the album peaked on the Billboard albums chart on November 23, 1974.) No Other reached a disappointing peak of No. 144 on the Billboard charts without any active promotion from the label, barring the release of two promotional 7" vinyl singles: "No Other" and "The True One" in January 1975, and "Life's Greatest Fool" backed with "From a Silver Phial" in March 1975. (Note: Promotional singles for "Life's Greatest Fool", featuring an edited version at 3:08 length, were issued in the United States in December 1974.) The album was also a critical failure at the time, with many writers lambasting Kaye's "bloated" and "pretentious" production style. Further confounding matters was the album's artwork: the front cover was a collage inspired by 1920s Hollywood glamour, while the back featured a photo of the singer with permed hair and clad in full drag, frolicking at the former estate of John Barrymore. A rare fall tour staged by the singer could not salvage the endeavour, and demos for a new album—reportedly a fusion of country rock with R&B, funk, and early disco stylings—were promptly rejected by Asylum; an unproven rumor has it that an enraged Clark nearly brawled with Geffen one night at Dan Tana's in West Hollywood when they unexpectedly ran into each other. Geffen, however, disputed this claim, saying that it never happened. By 1976, No Other had been deleted from the Asylum catalog.

In later years, Clark remained disappointed with the lack of success achieved by No Other, which he deemed to be his masterpiece in several interviews. As written in Record Collector in November 2019, "The failure of No Other didn't just disappoint Geffen, it hurt Clark. According to [Gene's] brother David, '[Gene] put everything into that... everything. Heart, soul, money, everything he had he poured into that thing because it was going to be his reclamation, and when they killed it, it killed him.'"

== Reissues ==
In 1989, No Other was first issued on CD by the German reissue label LINE. By the late 1990s, perhaps indirectly because of his death, interest in Clark's catalog had grown to the point where three songs from No Other were included on the double disc compilation entitled Flying High. On August 18, 2003, Warner Strategic Marketing in Europe released a remastered reissue including "Train Leaves Here This Morning" and several alternate, semi-acoustic renditions as bonus tracks. A skeletal version lacking the bonus tracks but containing restored packaging and new liner notes had appeared in the United States in April 2003 on Collector's Choice Music.

4AD reissued No Other on November 8, 2019. The original tapes were remastered at Abbey Road Studios, and the reissue features a brand new 5.1 surround mix of the album, which was mixed by Neil Wilkes and BJ Cole at Opus Productions in West London, along with a new high resolution stereo remix by Neil Wilkes and Nick Ward. Both remixes were mastered at Opus Productions by Neil Wilkes. All the studio tapes were forensically worked on and mixed by the duo of Gene Clark aficionado Sid Griffin and producer John Wood; the extra tracks have not been edited or composited in any way, "allowing for everything to be heard exactly as it went down in the studio and before any overdubbing took place". The remastered reissue was released as a standard CD, vinyl LP, deluxe double-CD set, and an expansive super deluxe box set with three hybrid SACDs, one Blu-ray disc (featuring the documentary film The Byrd Who Flew Alone: The Making and Remaking of No Other, directed by Paul Kendall), a silver-colored LP with original replica poster, and a hardbound 80-page book featuring essays, photos, lyrics and liner notes. Additionally, pre-orders of the super deluxe box set from 4AD's website included two bonus 7"-sized flexi-discs featuring two unreleased takes not included on any other format.

== Reception ==
Retrospective professional reviews
Aggregate scores
| Source | Rating |
|---|---|
| Metacritic | 94/100 |
Review scores
| Source | Rating |
| AllMusic | 5/5 stars |
| American Songwriter | 5/5 stars |
| The Encyclopedia of Popular Music | 5/5 stars |
| Los Angeles Times | positive |
| No Depression | positive |
| Pitchfork | 9.3/10 |
| Record Collector | 5/5 stars |
| Rolling Stone | 4/5 stars |
| Stylus Magazine | A |
| Variety | positive |

In October 1974, Billboard declared the album to be "a magnificent effort" with Clark's "usual superb mix of country and rock tunes, his melodic vocals and his beautiful set of songs." Retrospective reviews of No Other have been likewise overwhelmingly positive. AllMusic's Thom Jurek praised the album; in a five-star review, Jurek called it "a sprawling, ambitious work that seamlessly melds country, folk, jazz-inflected-gospel, urban blues, and breezy L.A. rock in a song cycle that reflects the mid-'70s better than anything from the time, yet continues to haunt the present with its relevance." The Guardian hailed No Other as "One of the greatest albums ever made... Initially celebrated for its obscurity, No Other is now celebrated for its magnificence. It was in every way a magnum opus: epic, sprawling, poetic, choral, rococo."

In a 2016 article entitled "Gene Clark – 10 of the Best", The Guardian included three tracks from No Other on its list: "Life's Greatest Fool", "No Other" and "Some Misunderstanding". Of "Life's Greatest Fool", writer and music critic David Bennun called the song "an exuberant, foot-tapping country-gospel anthem stuffed with counterculture folk wisdom; its downbeat lyric defied by its pure joie de vivre." Bennun said the album's title track "pulses, glows and rattles in a thrilling meld of country and funk, gospel and rock, with echoes of the Family Stone, Staple Singers, "Gimme Shelter" and Abbey Road," concluding that the song is "unique not only in his own catalogue but perhaps in all of pop music." For "Some Misunderstanding", Bennun hailed the song as "the centrepiece of the No Other album and indeed of Clark's career: a slow, eight-minute cry from the heart, reflecting on the perils and pleasures of a life lived too extravagantly. For Clark, who would surely have recognised William Blake as a spiritual progenitor, the road of excess had at last brought him to the palace of wisdom – and what a palace his is."

The 2019 deluxe edition reissue of No Other holds a 94 out of 100 rating on Metacritic, indicating "universal acclaim," based on 12 reviews. American Songwriter magazine awarded the reissue a full five out of five stars, and stated, "It's a lovingly assembled package and the last word on a once misunderstood but now acknowledged masterpiece." Pitchfork gave the album a 9.3 out of 10 rating and awarded its "Best New Reissue" tag to the reissue; reviewer Andy Beta declared, "The Byrds frontman's deliriously opulent solo work was misunderstood upon release, but this lavish repackaging restores a spiritual singer-songwriter classic."

== Legacy ==
"Gram Parsons dreamt of creating a kind of Cosmic American Music, which would seamlessly incorporate the country songs he so adored with the sounds and styles that abounded from sea to shining sea. But Gene Clark actually went and did it. From start to finish, No Other consists of godlike pop songs assembled with the lyricism and poignancy of the very best country music, the evergreen freshness of late-Sixties/early-Seventies soul, the untrammelled reach of the masters of beyond-MOR (Spector, Webb, Bacharach/David), the power and exuberance of gospel."

— Music critic David Bennun on the album's championing of country rock through its mixture of different genres.

British dream pop collective This Mortal Coil performed a cover of "Strength of Strings" on their 1986 album Filigree & Shadow, with vocals by Breathless frontman Dominic Appleton. Regarding 4AD's 2019 reissue of No Other, Chris Morris of Variety wrote, "In terms of its present release, the most important No Other enthusiast and Gene Clark fan is undoubtedly Ivo Watts-Russell, the co-founder of England's 4AD. As musical director of This Mortal Coil, the label's atmospheric act of the late '80s and early '90s, he included a couple of Clark compositions, including the No Other number 'Strength of Strings', on the band's albums. Though Watts-Russell is no longer partnered in the company, Clark's record plainly remains part of 4AD's DNA, and that status led to the firm's in-depth, madly indulgent and frankly wonderful reintroduction of the '74 album in nearly every configuration imaginable".

In 2009, British duo Soulsavers and vocalist Mark Lanegan performed a cover of "Some Misunderstanding", which appears on their album Broken.

No Other was voted #178 in Colin Larkin's All Time Top 1000 Albums (third edition, 2000). Online publication Yardbarker included No Other on their list of "20 awesome albums that critics initially hated" in January 2019. The album was listed at #133 on Treble Zine's August 2019 list of "The Best 150 Albums of the '70s"; the review called No Other "a lushly arranged, soulful and occasionally psychedelic set of country rock" and quipped, "Knowing that [the album] was unappreciated by both critics and the record-buying public in 1974 seems a bit baffling 45 years later."

In 2014, Victoria Legrand and Alex Scally of Beach House put together a band, named the Gene Clark No Other Band, for a four-concert tour where they performed the entire album to bring it to a new audience. The band consisted of fellow Baltimore musicians including members of Lower Dens, Wye Oak, Celebration, Fleet Foxes, Grizzly Bear and The Walkmen, along with Iain Matthews of Fairport Convention and Plainsong fame.

No Other has been included in 1001 Albums You Must Hear Before You Die since the original 2005 edition.

== Track listing ==
All songs written and composed by Gene Clark, with additional songwriters as noted. All songs arranged by Gene Clark and Thomas Jefferson Kaye.

Side one
| No. | Title | Length |
|---|---|---|
| 1. | "Life's Greatest Fool" | 4:44 |
| 2. | "Silver Raven" | 4:53 |
| 3. | "No Other" | 5:08 |
| 4. | "Strength of Strings" | 6:32 |

Side two
| No. | Title | Additional songwriter | Length |
|---|---|---|---|
| 1. | "From a Silver Phial" | | 3:40 |
| 2. | "Some Misunderstanding" | | 8:09 |
| 3. | "The True One" | | 3:59 (Note: Nearly all copies of the album erroneously list the running time of "The True One" as 4:57.) |
| 4. | "Lady of the North" | Doug Dillard | 6:04 |
| Total length: | | | 43:07 |

=== 2003 CD reissue bonus tracks ===
| No. | Title | Additional songwriter | Length |
|---|---|---|---|
| 9. | "Train Leaves Here This Morning" | Bernie Leadon | 5:04 |
| 10. | "Life's Greatest Fool" (alternate version) | | 4:25 |
| 11. | "Silver Raven" (alternate version) | | 3:04 |
| 12. | "No Other" (alternate version) | | 4:03 |
| 13. | "From a Silver Phial" (alternate version) | | 3:46 |
| 14. | "Some Misunderstanding" (alternate version) | | 5:25 |
| 15. | "Lady of the North" (alternate version) | Dillard | 5:46 |
| Total length: | | | 74:56 |

=== 2019 reissue bonus discs ===
No Other Sessions 1 (disc two)
| No. | Title | Additional songwriter | Length |
|---|---|---|---|
| 1. | "From a Silver Phial" (version 4) | | 3:51 |
| 2. | "Silver Raven" (version 2) | | 6:35 |
| 3. | "Some Misunderstanding" (version 3) | | 5:20 |
| 4. | "Life's Greatest Fool" (version 2) | | 4:27 |
| 5. | "Train Leaves Here This Morning" (version 2) | Leadon | 5:02 |
| 6. | "Lady of the North" (version 2) | Dillard | 5:45 |
| 7. | "The True One" (version 2) | | 4:18 |
| 8. | "Strength of Strings" (version 2) | | 6:29 |
| 9. | "No Other" (version 2) | | 5:40 |
| Total length: | | | 41:34 |

No Other Sessions 2 (disc three)
| No. | Title | Additional songwriter | Length |
|---|---|---|---|
| 1. | "From a Silver Phial" (version 1) | | 4:08 |
| 2. | "Life's Greatest Fool" (version 1) | | 4:10 |
| 3. | "No Other" (version 1) | | 5:15 |
| 4. | "Lady of the North" (version 1) | Dillard | 5:54 |
| 5. | "Some Misunderstanding" (version 1) | | 5:12 |
| 6. | "Silver Raven" (version 1) | | 5:00 |
| 7. | "Train Leaves Here This Morning" (version 1) | Leadon | 5:46 |
| 8. | "The True One" (version 1) | | 4:42 |
| 9. | "Strength of Strings" (version 1) | | 6:23 |
| 10. | "Life's Greatest Fool" (1974 single version) | | 3:10 |
| 11. | "Silver Raven" (1974 single edit) | | 3:21 |
| Total length: | | | 52:58 |

Super deluxe box set bonus 7" single
| No. | Title | Additional songwriter | Length |
|---|---|---|---|
| 1. | "Life's Greatest Fool" (1974 single version) | | 3:08 |
| 2. | "Train Leaves Here This Morning" (version 2) | Leadon | 5:01 |

4AD pre-order bonus flexi-disc #1
| No. | Title | Length |
|---|---|---|
| 1. | "From a Silver Phial" (version 3) | 3:56 |

4AD pre-order bonus flexi-disc #2
| No. | Title | Length |
|---|---|---|
| 1. | "Some Misunderstanding" (version 2) | 5:40 |

== Personnel ==
Musicians

- Gene Clark – lead vocals, guitar
- Jerry McGee – guitar
- Jesse Ed Davis – guitar on tracks 1, 2 and 5
- Buzz Feiten – guitar on tracks 4 and 6
- Stephen Bruton – guitar on tracks 1 and 6
- Danny Kortchmar – guitar on track 2
- Ben Keith – pedal steel guitar on track 7
- Leland Sklar – bass
- Chris Hillman – mandolin on track 5
- Michael Utley – keyboards
- Craig Doerge – keyboards on tracks 4 and 8
- Bill Cuomo – Rheem organ on track 6
- Russ Kunkel – drums on tracks 1, 2, 4, 5, 6 and 8
- Butch Trucks – drums on tracks 3 and 7
- Joe Lala – percussion on tracks 1, 3, 5 and 7
- Ted Machell – cello on track 8
- Richard Greene – violin on tracks 4, 6 and 8
- Ronnie Barron – background vocals on tracks 1, 2, 3, 4 and 6
- Cindy Bullens – background vocals on tracks 1, 2, 3, 4 and 6
- Venetta Fields – background vocals on tracks 1 and 6
- Clydie King – background vocals on tracks 1 and 6
- Claudia Lennear – background vocals on tracks 1, 2, 3, 4 and 6
- Sherlie Matthews – background vocals on tracks 1 and 6
- Timothy B. Schmit – background vocals on tracks 2, 3, 4 and 5
- Carlena Williams – background vocals on tracks 1 and 6

Technical

- Thomas Jefferson Kaye – producer
- Tony Reale – recording engineer
- Joe Tuzen – assistant recording engineer
- Mallory Earl – mixing engineer
- Steve Malcolm – assistant mixing engineer

Visual

- Linda Dietrich – photography
- John Dietrich – art direction and design
- Ea O'Leno – cover artwork
- Pleasure Dome, Hollywood – clothing designer

2019 remaster additional credits

- Neil Wilkes & BJ Cole – 5.1 remix
- Neil Wilkes & Nick Ward – stereo remix
- Neil Wilkes – 5.1 & stereo remix mastering engineer
- Sid Griffin – mixer for bonus tracks, liner notes
- John Wood – producer and mixer for bonus tracks
- Matias Duarte – engineer assistant
- Alex Wharton – remastering, analogue transfers
- Steve Webbon – project supervision
- Rich Walker – project supervision
- Kevin Vanbergen – multitrack transfers
- Johnny Rogan – liner notes
- John Einarson – liner notes
- Martin Aston – liner notes
- Andrew Perry – liner notes
