= Roadmaster (album) =

Studio album by Gene Clark
- Released: January 1973
- Recorded: May 1970–June 1972
- Genre: Country rock
- Length: 39:40
- Label: A&M Records
- Producer: Jim Dickson, Chris Hinshaw

Gene Clark chronology
| White Light (1971) | Roadmaster (1973) | No Other (1974) |

Professional ratings
Review scores
| Source | Rating |
|---|---|
| AllMusic | 4/5 stars |

Roadmaster is the third studio album by Gene Clark, released in January 1973. The album was compiled from various unreleased recordings for A&M Records made in 1970 through 1972. Eight tracks are from an April 1972 recording session featuring Clarence White, Chris Ethridge, Spooner Oldham, Sneaky Pete Kleinow, Byron Berline and Michael Clarke; two tracks ("One in a Hundred" and "She's the Kind of Girl") derived from an unissued single reassembling the five original Byrds prior to their 1973 reunion album; and the remaining track, "Here Tonight", had been recorded with The Flying Burrito Brothers. Other recordings of songs on Roadmaster featuring Clark have been released elsewhere: "One in a Hundred" initially appeared on Clark's previous solo album White Light, Full Circle Song was later re-recorded with the Byrds for their reunion album and was released as the albums only single, while "She Don't Care About Time" had originally been recorded with the Byrds in 1965 and was released as the B-side to "Turn! Turn! Turn!".

Initially released only in the Netherlands and later in Japan and Germany, it was reissued on compact disc for the American market in 1994.

== Track listing ==
All tracks are written by Gene Clark, except where noted.

| No. | Title | Writer(s) | Length |
|---|---|---|---|
| 1. | "She's the Kind of Girl" | | 2:59 |
| 2. | "One in a Hundred" | | 2:45 |
| 3. | "Here Tonight" | | 3:29 |
| 4. | "Full Circle Song" | | 2:44 |
| 5. | "In a Misty Morning" | | 4:56 |
| 6. | "Rough and Rocky" | Lester Flatt, Earl Scruggs | 3:14 |
| 7. | "Roadmaster" | Freddy Weller, Spooner Oldham | 4:12 |
| 8. | "I Really Don't Want to Know" | Don Robertson, Howard Barnes | 4:35 |
| 9. | "I Remember the Railroad" | | 2:31 |
| 10. | "She Don't Care About Time" | | 3:37 |
| 11. | "Shooting Star" | | 4:38 |

== Personnel ==
Tracks 1, 2: with The Byrds

- Gene Clark – vocals, acoustic guitar
- Chris Hillman – bass guitar, vocals
- David Crosby, Roger McGuinn – guitars, vocals
- Michael Clarke – drums
- Bud Shank – flute on "She's The Kind Of Girl"

Track 3: with The Flying Burrito Brothers

- Gene Clark – vocals, acoustic guitar
- Chris Hillman – bass guitar, vocals
- Sneaky Pete Kleinow – pedal steel guitar
- Bernie Leadon, Rick Roberts – guitars, vocals
- Michael Clarke – drums

Tracks 4–11:

- Gene Clark – vocals, acoustic guitar, piano
- Clarence White – electric guitar, backing vocals
- Sneaky Pete Kleinow – pedal steel guitar
- Spooner Oldham – keyboards, backing vocals
- Chris Ethridge – bass guitar
- Michael Clarke – drums
- Byron Berline – fiddle
- Roger McGuinn, Rick Clark – backing vocals presumably not included in the definitive album mix

=== Production ===
- Producers: Jim Dickson (Tracks 1–3), Chris Hinshaw (Tracks 4–11)
- Recording Engineer: Chris Hinshaw
- Art Direction: n/a
- Photography: Henry Diltz
- Liner notes: Barry Ballard
