= Dillard & Clark =

American country rock duo

- Origin: Los Angeles, California, United States
- Genres: Country rock; progressive bluegrass
- Years active: 1968–1969
- Labels: A&M
- Past members: Gene Clark; Doug Dillard

Dillard & Clark was a country rock collaboration between ex-Byrds member Gene Clark and bluegrass banjo player Doug Dillard.

== History ==
Their collaboration began in 1968, shortly after Clark departed the Byrds and Dillard left the Dillards. They were considered part of the Southern California country-rock scene in the late 1960s, along with Poco, the Flying Burrito Brothers, Linda Ronstadt, Michael Nesmith and the First National Band, Rick Nelson & The Stone Canyon Band, and the latter-day Byrds.

Their first album The Fantastic Expedition of Dillard & Clark was released in 1968 on A&M. Recording personnel included Clark (lead vocals, acoustic guitar, harmonica), Dillard (banjo, fiddle, guitar), Bernie Leadon (vocals, lead guitar, bass, banjo), David Jackson (bass), Don Beck (mandolin, resonator guitar), with guests Chris Hillman (mandolin), Byron Berline (fiddle), and Andy Belling (harpsichord). Most of the songs were written by Clark, Dillard, and Leadon. Drummer Michael Clarke assisted with a few early live performances.

The album is praised by connoisseurs for its iconic quality and innovative character, at the intersection of country rock and americana.

The duo's only other album, Through the Morning, Through the Night, was released in 1969. Donna Washburn (guitar, vocals) joined the group, and Bernie Leadon departed in June to join Linda Ronstadt's band The Corvettes, replacing Jeff Hanna who returned to the Nitty Gritty Dirt Band. Further band members were Berline, Jackson, and Jon Corneal (drums). Leadon, Hillman, and Sneaky Pete Kleinow (pedal steel guitar) made guest appearances.

After his work with Dillard, Gene Clark resumed a solo career. Dillard kept performing as Doug Dillard & The Expedition for a short time, but soon pursued his own solo career. Byron Berline went on to form the Country Gazette with guitarist/bassist Roger Bush.

== Discography ==
=== Albums ===
Date of Official Release	Title	Label	Recording Date
October 1968	The Fantastic Expedition of Dillard & Clark	A&M	1968
August 1969	Through the Morning, Through the Night	A&M	1969

=== Singles ===
- 1968: "Train Leaves Here This Mornin'" / "Out on the Side" (A&M)
- 1969: "Why Not Your Baby" / "The Radio Song" (A&M)
- 1969: "Don't Be Cruel" / "Lyin' Down the Middle" (A&M)
- 1970: "Don't Let Me Down" / "Rocky Top" (A&M)
- 2012: "Why Not Your Baby" / "Lyin' Down the Middle" (A&M / Sundazed)

=== Compilations ===
- 1970: Grass Roots (A&M) (compilation of songs by the Flying Burrito Brothers and Dillard & Clark)
- 1973: Kansas City Southern (A&M) (Netherlands release)
- 1975: G & D (A&M) (Netherlands release)
- 1989: The Fantastic Expedition of Dillard & Clark & Through the Morning Through the Night (A&M) (compilation of both albums)
