= So Rebellious a Lover =

Studio album by Gene Clark and Carla Olson
- Released: April 1987
- Recorded: Early 1986
- Studio: Control Center, Los Angeles, California
- Genre: Folk rock; country rock; alternative country
- Length: 44:08
- Label: Rhino
- Producer: Michael Huey

Gene Clark and Carla Olson chronology
So Rebellious a Lover (1987)	Silhouetted in Light – Live in Concert (1992)

So Rebellious a Lover is a 1987 studio album by American singer-songwriters Gene Clark and Carla Olson. Released in April 1987, the album revived Clark's flagging career. It was well-received and became a modest commercial success, at the time the biggest-selling album of Clark's solo career. Although no promotional singles were released from the album, several tracks ("The Drifter", "Gypsy Rider", "Del Gato" and "Are We Still Making Love") are well regarded among fans.

== Background ==
"They played their set to a room of maybe 50, mostly UCLA students who were there to drink," Olson recalls. "At the end of the show, the Gene Clark fans coaxed an encore out of them, and they launched into 'I'll Feel a Whole Lot Better'. Tom Slocum, one of Gene’s friends, was sitting in the next booth and asked if he could join us. The next thing I knew he was taking my hand and pulling me along toward the stage. He said, 'You can sing with them on this one, you know it — right?' Halfway through the guitar solo, Gene says, 'Hi, I'm Gene Clark,' to which I replied, 'Carla, Carla Olson, nice to meet you!'"

—Carla Olson, on meeting Gene Clark.

By the mid-1980s, Clark's career had reached its nadir. 1984's Firebyrd, with his short-lived band of the same name, had been another in a string of critically acclaimed but commercially unsuccessful outings. Around this time, the rising popularity of jangle rockers like Tom Petty and R.E.M. sparked a new interest in the Byrds, and Clark began developing new fans among L.A.'s roots-conscious paisley underground scene. At what would become FireByrd's swansong gig at Madame Wong's West in West Los Angeles, Gene would meet singer/songwriter Carla Olson and her manager Saul Davis. Following a series of impromptu writing sessions at Clark's home, the pair entered the studio in early 1986 with drummer Michael Huey producing.

== Production ==
The album was recorded at Control Center Studios in Los Angeles. For the sessions, Huey assembled a backing band which included Roscoe Beck on bass, Otha Young on acoustic guitar, Skip Edwards on keyboards, and Long Ryders guitarist Stephen McCarthy added dobro and lap steel. Huey himself provided the drums.

Chris Hillman, Clark's former bandmate in the Byrds, performs on mandolin on several tracks.

== Reception ==
Retrospective professional reviews
Review scores
Source	Rating
AllMusic	4/5 stars

Released in April, 1987, So Rebellious a Lover has been cited as one of the first true Americana albums.

Reviewing the album for AllMusic, music critic Matthew Greenwald wrote, "the feeling of spontaneity and closeness of spirit engulfs all of the cuts here. Olson's strident and powerful vocals mesh beautifully with Clark's slightly world-weary, soulful performances. As for the material, both songwriters obviously put their best foot forward here. Olson's "The Drifter" and "Are We Still Making Love" are excellent country-folk outings. Clark contributes one of his finest later compositions, "Gypsy Rider," a multi-leveled song that can easily be viewed as autobiographical."

Rolling Stone ranked "Gypsy Rider" as one of Clark's 21 best songs. Writer and music critic David Bennun calls the song "as sorrowful a motorcycle tune as you’ll ever hear," concluding, "it invokes an almost unbearable sadness at the prospect of leaving yet another love...It is easy to read too much into words in hindsight, but it truly does sound as if he is performing his own elegy." Olson recalls of the song, "It conjured images, the first time Gene played it for me, of Michael Parks's character in Then Came Bronson, the 1969 television series. I think that Gene envied that lifestyle — the drifter with a kind heart."

== Track listing ==
Side one
No.	Title	Songwriter(s)	Length
1.	"The Drifter"	Carla Olson, Joe Read, Tom Junior Morgan	4:54
2.	"Gypsy Rider"	Gene Clark	4:32
3.	"Every Angel in Heaven"	Carla Olson George Callins	3:55
4.	"Del Gato"	Gene Clark, Rick Clark	4:54
5.	"Deportee (Plane Wreck at Los Gatos)"	Martin Hoffman, Woody Guthrie	3:39

Side two
No.	Title	Songwriter(s)	Length
1.	"Fair and Tender Ladies"	Gene Clark, Traditional	5:02
2.	"Almost Saturday Night"	John Fogerty	2:37
3.	"I'm Your Toy (Hot Burrito #1)"	Gram Parsons, Chris Ethridge	4:13
4.	"Are We Still Making Love"	Carla Olson	3:27
5.	"Why Did You Leave Me Today"	Gene Clark	3:51
6.	"Don't It Make You Want to Go Home"	Joe South	3:21
Total length:			44:08

=== 2018 CD reissue bonus tracks ===
No.	Title	Songwriter(s)	Length
12.	"Changes"	Phil Ochs	3:28
13.	"Day for Night"	Gene Clark	2:53
14.	"Jokers Are Wild"	Dick Holler, Pat Robinson	3:28
15.	"Winning Hand"	Gene Clark	2:34
16.	"Lover's Turnaround"	Gene Clark, Thomas Jefferson Kaye	3:25
17.	"Broken Hearts and Broken Dreams"	Dianne Baumgartner	4:20
Total length:			64:50

== Personnel ==
Credits adapted from Discogs.

- Gene Clark – lead vocals, guitar
- Carla Olson – lead vocals
- Otha Young – acoustic guitar on tracks 1–11
- Randy Fuller – banjo
- Roscoe Beck – bass on tracks 1–11
- Joe Read – bass on tracks 13–16
- Hans Christian – cello on tracks 1–11
- Stephen McCarthy – dobro, lap steel guitar on tracks 1–11
- Michael Huey – drums, percussion on tracks 1–11
- Phil Seymour – drums, vocals on tracks 13–16
- Tom Junior Morgan – flute, piano on tracks 1–11
- Skip Edwards – keyboards on tracks 1–11
- George Callins – lead guitar on tracks 13–16
- Chris Hillman – mandolin on tracks 1–11
- Ed Black – pedal steel guitar on tracks 1–11
- Pat Robinson – piano, vocals on tracks 13–16

Technical

- Michael Huey – producer, mixing engineer
- Rick Novack – recording engineer
- Guy Roche – recording engineer on tracks 13–17
- Bob Saldana – producer, recording engineer and mixing engineer on track 17
- Saul Davis – A&R and concept
- Gary Nichamin – photography
- Janis Garza – photography
