= Gene Clark with the Gosdin Brothers =

Studio album by Gene Clark
- Released: January 1967
- Recorded: August–November 1966
- Genres: Folk rock, country rock
- Length: 28:15
- Labels: Columbia (US); CBS (UK)
- Producers: Larry Marks, Gary Usher

Gene Clark chronology
Gene Clark with the Gosdin Brothers (1967)	The Fantastic Expedition of Dillard & Clark (1968)

Singles from Gene Clark with the Gosdin Brothers
- 1. "Echoes" / "I Found You" Released: December 1966; 2. "So You Say You Lost Your Baby" / "Is Yours Is Mine" Released: April 19, 1967

Professional ratings
Review scores
Source	Rating
AllMusic	4/5 stars
NME	9/10

Gene Clark with the Gosdin Brothers is the debut solo album by the American singer-songwriter Gene Clark. Released in January 1967 on Columbia Records, the album was his first effort after his departure from the folk-rock group the Byrds in 1966. The music is a unique mixture of pop, country rock and baroque psychedelic tracks, which received favorable reviews and reinforced Clark's stature as a talented singer-songwriter. Unfortunately for Clark, it was released almost simultaneously with the Byrds' Younger Than Yesterday, also on Columbia, and partly because of his 18-month absence from public attention was a commercial failure.

Musicians on the album include: former bandmates Chris Hillman and Michael Clarke; Wrecking Crew session musicians Glen Campbell, Jerry Cole, Jim Gordon, and Leon Russell; future Byrd Clarence White; and Clark's future collaborator Doug Dillard. The folk/country vocal duo the Gosdin Brothers added backing vocals, and subsequently received co-billing.

== Reissues ==
The album was first reissued in the US in 1972, omitting "Elevator Operator" and with re-recorded vocals and remixed backing tracks designed to "soften" the sound, under the title Collector's Series: Early LA Sessions.

The album's first compact disc reissue appeared in 1988 on the Edsel Records label (UK), using the original 1966 stereo mix. Two years later, CBS Special Products (US) elected to use the original mono master for their CD reissue, which added a previously unreleased alternate mono mix of "Tried So Hard" as a bonus track.

A repackage on the Columbia/Legacy imprint in 1991 was titled Echoes, and was (mostly) remixed, though closer to the sound of the original album than the 1972 Collector's Series: Early LA Sessions – the most significant changes were the removal of vocal double-tracking and some extended song endings. Echoes altered the original album running order, added "The French Girl" (an Ian and Sylvia cover), "Only Colombe," an acoustic demo of "So You Say You Lost Your Baby," and several Clark-penned songs from early Byrds recordings (also remixed).

Both the 1997 reissue on Edsel Records and the 2007 reissue on Sundazed Music (produced by Bob Irwin) restored the original album mix and track order, with the latter including a number of alternate takes from the album sessions.

A 2014 CD from Sony Music Japan included the original 1966 mono mix, the 1972 Collector's Series: Early LA Sessions remix, and eleven mono and stereo bonus tracks – a total of thirty-two tracks.

== Track listing ==
All tracks by Gene Clark, except where noted.

=== Side one ===
1. "Echoes" (3:15)
2. "Think I'm Gonna Feel Better" (1:32)
3. "Tried So Hard" (2:18)
4. "Is Yours Is Mine" (2:25)
5. "Keep on Pushin'" (Clark, Bill Rinehart) (1:44)
6. "I Found You" (3:00)

=== Side two ===
1. "So You Say You Lost Your Baby" (2:07)
2. "Elevator Operator" (Clark, Rinehart) (2:53)
3. "The Same One" (3:27)
4. "Couldn't Believe Her" (1:52)
5. "Needing Someone" (2:03)

=== 2007 Sundazed reissue bonus tracks ===
1. "Tried So Hard" (previously unissued alternate version) (2:18)
2. "Elevator Operator" (previously unissued alternate version) (2:53)
3. "Only Colombe" (previously unissued mono version) (2:18)
4. "The French Girl" (Ian Tyson, Sylvia Fricker) (previously unissued mono version) (2:18)
5. "So You Say You Lost Your Baby" (previously unissued acoustic demo) (2:07)
6. "Is Yours Is Mine" (previously unissued acoustic demo) (2:25)

== Personnel ==
- Gene Clark – guitar, harmonica, vocals
- Vern Gosdin – backing vocals
- Rex Gosdin – backing vocals
- Glen Campbell – electric guitar
- Jerry Cole – guitars
- Bill Rinehart – guitars
- Clarence White – guitar on "Tried So Hard" "The Same One" and "Needing Someone"
- Doug Dillard – electric banjo on "Keep on Pushin'"
- Leon Russell – piano, harpsichord; string arrangements on "Echoes" and "So You Say You Lost Your Baby"
- Van Dyke Parks – keyboards
- Chris Hillman – bass
- Jim Gordon – drums
- Michael Clarke – drums
- Joel Larson – drums uncredited
