= Two Sides to Every Story =

Studio album by Gene Clark
- Released: February 1977
- Recorded: 1976
- Studio: Fidelity Recording Studio, North Hollywood, California
- Genre: Country rock, bluegrass
- Length: 43:58
- Label: RSO
- Producer: Thomas Jefferson Kaye

Gene Clark chronology
No Other (1974)	Two Sides to Every Story (1977)	Firebyrd (1984)

Singles from Two Sides to Every Story
- 1. "Home Run King" / "Lonely Saturday" Released: January 1977

Two Sides to Every Story is the fifth studio album by American singer-songwriter Gene Clark, released in February 1977. The album was Clark's first release since his 1974 album No Other. Notable tracks include "In the Pines" (traditional), "Kansas City Southern" and "Hear the Wind", both written by Clark, and "Give My Love to Marie", a song written by James Talley that tells the story of a dying coal miner.

The album was produced by Thomas Jefferson Kaye. Guest musicians are Jeff Baxter, Emmylou Harris, Byron Berline, Al Perkins and John Hartford.

== Reception ==
Professional ratings
Review scores
Source	Rating
AllMusic	3.5/5 stars
American Songwriter	3/5 stars
Glide Magazine	10/10
MusicHound Rock	3/5 stars
Popdose	favorable
Record Collector	3/5 stars
Uncut	4/5 stars

Music critic Matthew Greenwald, writing for AllMusic, said: "the material is uneven, especially when Clark and the band try to rock out... But Clark's muse invariably guided him well even under awkward circumstances, and Two Sides has a number of superb moments... but if this is well short of a masterpiece, it's still clearly the work of a masterful singer and songwriter, and the best moments here are honestly magical." Hal Horowitz of American Songwriter wrote, "It's a low key yet delightfully straightforward set that even rocks out occasionally and showcases Clark's lovely understated vocals."

== Reissue ==
In 2011 High Moon Records announced that the label would be reissuing the album. In early 2013 the label reissued a vinyl version of the album remastered by Dan Hersch and Doug Sax. The vinyl included a download card for bonus tracks. High Moon reissued the album on CD (soft independent release to fans) with extra photos and a pdf booklet with a new essay written by Tom Sandford, along with bonus tracks in the Spring of 2014. In November 2014, the release was expanded to major markets and distributed worldwide.

== Track listing ==
All songs written by Gene Clark, except where noted.

Side one
No.	Title	Writer(s)	Length
1.	"Home Run King"		2:57
2.	"Lonely Saturday"		4:04
3.	"In the Pines"	Traditional; arranged by Gene Clark	4:22
4.	"Kansas City Southern"		4:38
5.	"Give My Love to Marie"	James Talley	6:05

Side two
No.	Title	Writer(s)	Length
1.	"Sister Moon"		5:06
2.	"Marylou"	Obie Jessie, Sam Ling	3:31
3.	"Hear the Wind"		3:06
4.	"Past Addresses"		5:22
5.	"Silent Crusade"		4:12

=== 2014 reissue downloadable bonus tracks ===
Live at Ebbet's Field, Denver, Colorado, October 1975
No.	Title	Writer(s)	Length
1.	"Life's Greatest Fool"		4:11
2.	"The True One"		3:16
3.	"The Radio Song"	Clark, Bernie Leadon	4:00
4.	"No Other"		3:21
5.	"Silver Raven"		5:25
6.	"In the Pines"	Traditional; arranged by Gene Clark	3:47
7.	"Hear the Wind"		4:28
8.	"I'll Feel a Whole Lot Better"		3:04
9.	"I'll Be Back"	Lennon, McCartney	3:28
10.	"She Darked the Sun"	Clark, Leadon	3:28
11.	"Kansas City Southern"		4:52
12.	"From a Silver Phial"		4:45
13.	"Home Run King"		3:06
14.	"Sister Moon"		5:02
15.	"The Daylight Line"		3:41

Live at Mother Blues, Dallas, Texas, May 24, 1975
No.	Title	Length
16.	"What Is Meant Will Be"	4:25
17.	"Wheel of Time"	2:19
18.	"Some Misunderstanding"	6:36
19.	"She Don't Care About Time"	2:59

Live at the Tango, 1984
No.	Title	Length
20.	"I Saw a Dream Come True"	4:30

Gene Clark Interview with B. Mitchel Reed, 1974
No.	Title	Length
21.	"(Interview)"	11:57

== Personnel ==
- Gene Clark – guitar, vocals
- Jeff Baxter – guitar
- Doug Dillard – banjo
- Byron Berline – fiddle
- Jim Fielder – bass
- Mike Utley – keyboards
- Jerry McGee – guitar
- Al Perkins – guitar
- Sammy Creason – drums
- John Hartford – background vocals
- Emmylou Harris – background vocals
- Steven Soles – background vocals
- Thomas Jefferson Kaye – background vocals
- Daniel Moore – background vocals
- Matthew Moore – background vocals
- Pepper Watkins – background vocals
- David Campbell – string arrangements

== Production ==
- Producer: Thomas Jefferson Kaye
- Executive Producer: Gary Legon
- Recording Engineer: Joel Soifer
- Art Direction: Ed Caraeff
- Photography: Ed Caraeff
- Design: David Larkham
