= Sneaky Pete Kleinow =

American country musician (1934–2007)

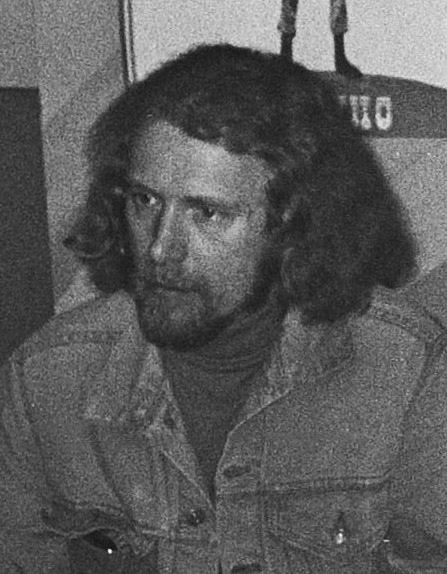
- Kleinow in 1970

Background information
- Also known as: "Sneaky Pete"
- Born: Peter E. Kleinow; August 20, 1934
- Origin: South Bend, Indiana, U.S.
- Died: January 6, 2007 (aged 72) Petaluma, California, U.S.
- Genre: Country rock
- Occupation: Musician
- Instrument: Pedal steel guitar
- Formerly of: Flying Burrito Brothers

Peter E. "Sneaky Pete" Kleinow (August 20, 1934 – January 6, 2007) was an American country-rock musician and animator. He was a member of the band the Flying Burrito Brothers, and worked extensively as a session musician, playing pedal steel guitar for Joan Baez, Jackson Browne, The Byrds, Leonard Cohen, Joe Cocker, Rita Coolidge, Eagles, The Everly Brothers, Ringo Starr, John Lennon, The Steve Miller Band, Joni Mitchell, The Rolling Stones, Stevie Wonder, Spencer Davis, Little Richard, Linda Ronstadt, Jimmie Spheeris and many others. He is a member of the Steel Guitar Hall of Fame.

Kleinow is also noteworthy for having composed the Gumby theme song as well as being an animator on the 1960s iteration of the show.

== Biography ==
Kleinow was born and raised in South Bend, Indiana; inspired by Jerry Byrd, he took up the pedal steel guitar in high school. Following graduation, he was employed for over a decade as a maintenance worker at the Michigan Department of Transportation. In 1963, he relocated to Los Angeles, where he began a career as a visual effects artist and stop motion animator in the film and television industry. After uncredited work on The Wonderful World of the Brothers Grimm (1962), The Outer Limits (1963–1965), and 7 Faces of Dr. Lao (1964), Kleinow became closely associated with the long-running children's series Gumby and Davey and Goliath while moonlighting in the city's country-oriented nightclubs as a member of Smokey Rogers & the Western Caravan (from which his distinctive nickname originated) and the Detours (often deputizing for bandleader Red Rhodes, then frequently employed as a session musician).

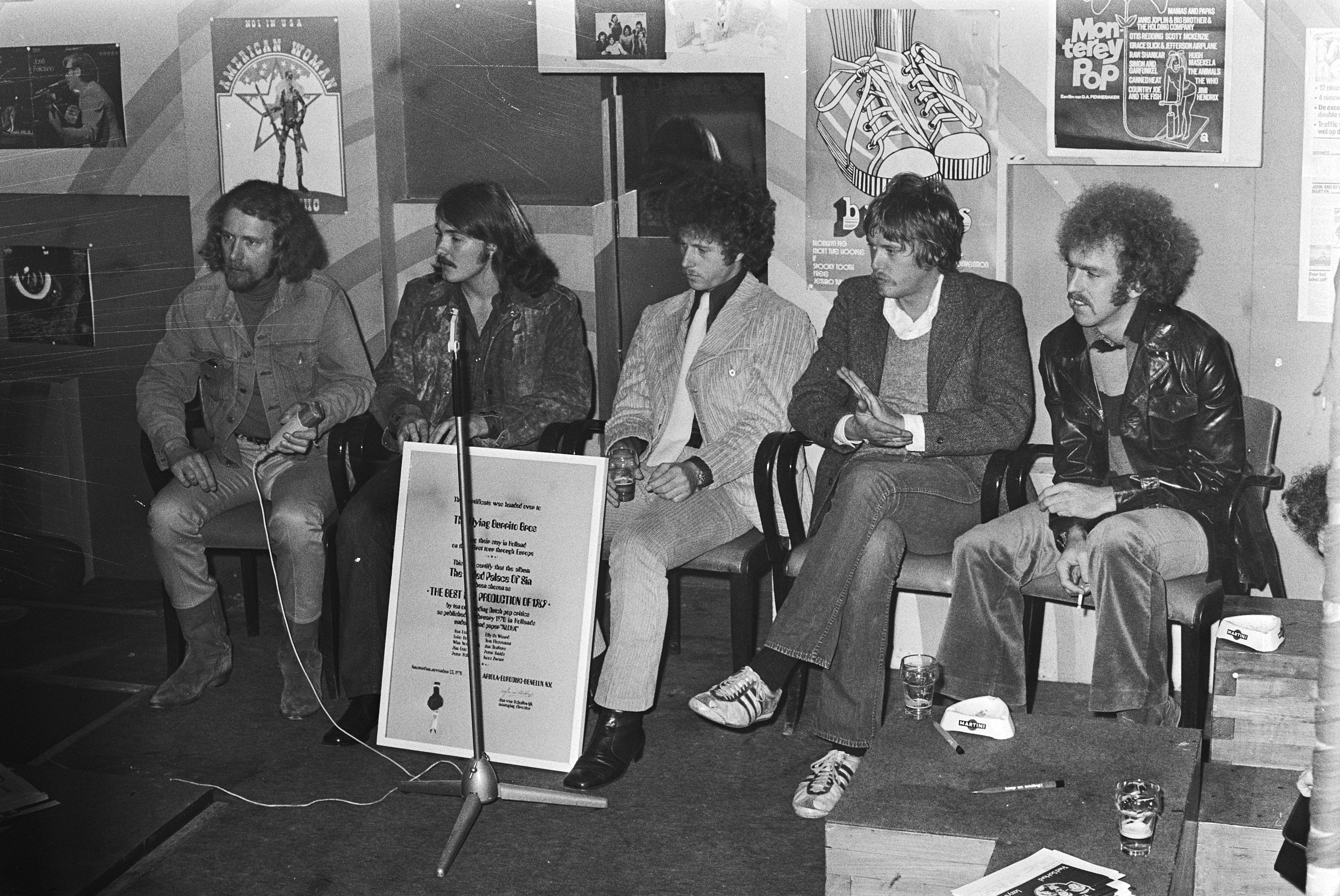
Flying Burrito Brothers (Amsterdam, 1970). From left to right: Sneaky Pete Kleinow, Rick Roberts, Chris Hillman, Michael Clarke, Bernie Leadon

Through this scene he became acquainted with Chris Hillman and Gram Parsons of the Byrds in 1968, helping the group to replicate their newly country-infused sound onstage with banjoist Doug Dillard on several local club dates. Guitarist Roger McGuinn later alleged that Hillman and Parsons intended to replace Dillard with Kleinow and did not countenance Kleinow's inclusion alongside Dillard in an upcoming European tour, a decision that hastened Hillman and Parsons' departure from the band. After signing to A&M Records and briefly considering Lloyd Green (who, as per Hillman, "would have never left a lucrative career as a session man to go out with us"), Parsons and Hillman invited Kleinow to join their new project: the Flying Burrito Brothers. For Kleinow, the opportunity was the culmination of his desire to "finally make a living with music," and he would work for much of the next decade as a professional musician. Never paragons of commercial success (the band's first album, The Gilded Palace of Sin, peaked at #164 on the Billboard album chart), the Flying Burrito Brothers would go on to influence generations of popular musicians.

One of the first pedal steel players to work in a rock context, Kleinow favored the outmoded Fender 400, a cable-operated eight-string model. According to bandmate Bernie Leadon, "Sneaky uniquely played an eight-string Fender cable pull steel tuned to B6 instead of the more common C6. He played a usually more jazz or swing tuning in a style that most other players use an E9 tuning for. His rationale was [that] B is the 'five chord,' or dominant chord, to the key of E. This resulted in absolutely-to-Pete steel licks. And no one else thinks like him anyway." In addition to favoring atypical tunings, Kleinow liberally incorporated such electronic accoutrements as the fuzzbox, the Leslie speaker and the Echoplex into his style. His unorthodox style of playing would immediately influence a number of second-generation country rock pedal steel players, including Jerry Garcia, Buddy Cage of the New Riders of the Purple Sage and his eventual replacement in the Burrito Brothers, session musician Al Perkins.

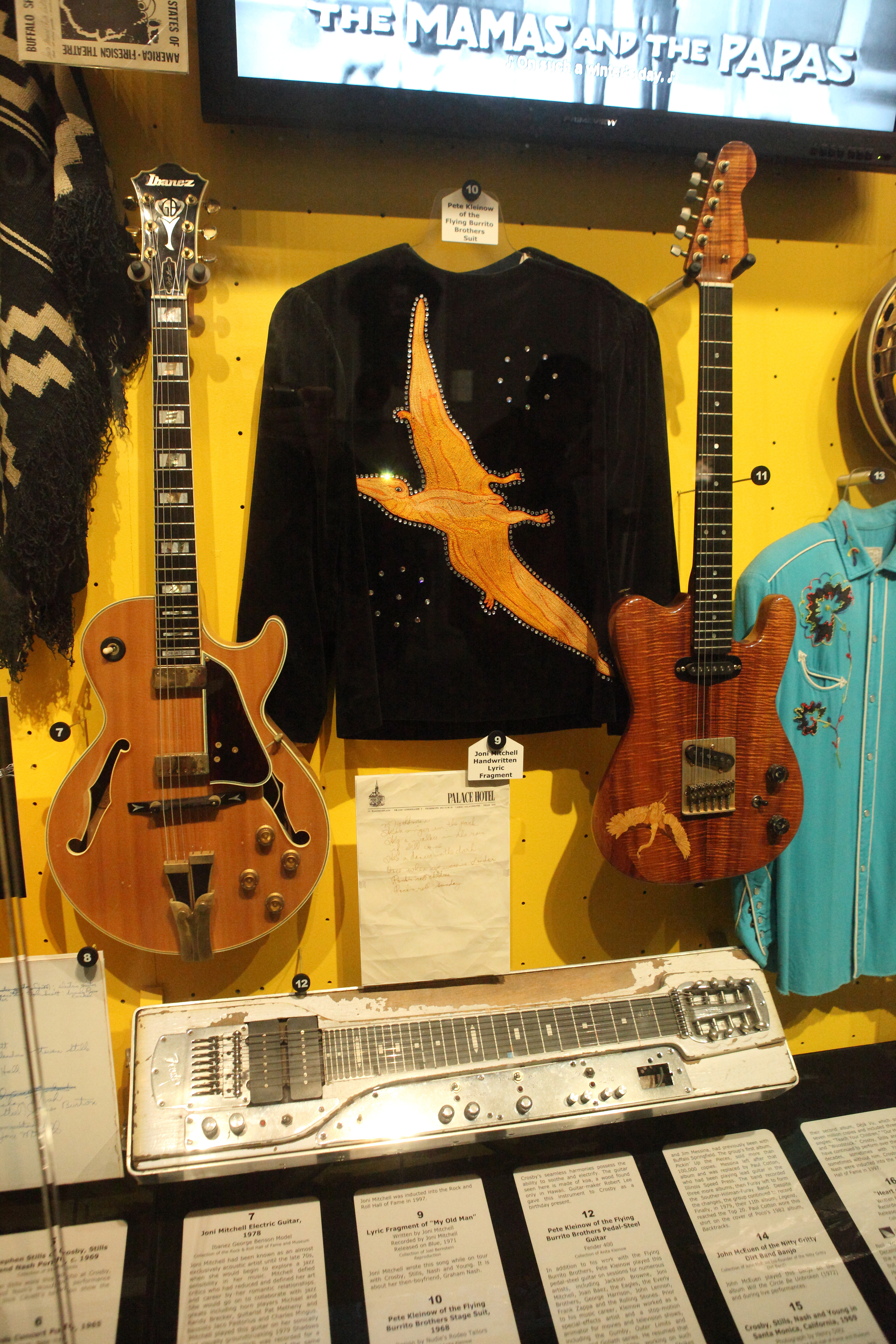
The nudie suit worn by Kleinow on the cover of 1969's The Gilded Palace of Sin, along with his Fender 400 pedal steel guitar, displayed at the Rock and Roll Hall of Fame in Cleveland.

Favoring a relatively abstemious and reclusive lifestyle in comparison to some of his bandmates (nevertheless, according to bassist Chris Ethridge, he "loved to drink wine" and frequently exhibited science fiction films at the "Burrito Manor" shared by Parsons and Hillman in Reseda throughout 1968); intolerant of the group's infamously erratic live performances; and increasingly disenchanted by his exclusion from the creative process—including the diminution of his parts in released mixes and the summary rejection of his songwriting efforts—Kleinow eventually left the Flying Burrito Brothers in 1971. Despite this setback, the imprimatur of the band allowed Kleinow to enjoy a lucrative career as a session musician throughout this period. He appeared on albums by Joe Cocker (Joe Cocker!, 1969), Delaney, Bonnie and Friends (To Bonnie from Delaney, 1970), Joni Mitchell (Blue, 1971), Billy Joel (Cold Spring Harbor, 1971), Little Feat (Sailin' Shoes, 1972), Little Richard (The Second Coming, 1972), Sandy Denny (Sandy, 1972), Frank Zappa (Waka/Jawaka, 1972), the Bee Gees (Life in a Tin Can, 1973), Yoko Ono (Feeling the Space, 1973), John Lennon (Mind Games, 1973), John Cale (Paris 1919, 1973), Linda Ronstadt (Heart Like A Wheel, 1974), Harry Nilsson (Pussy Cats, 1974), Stevie Wonder (Fulfillingness' First Finale, 1974 and Songs in the Key of Life, 1976), Fleetwood Mac (Heroes Are Hard to Find, 1974), and Leonard Cohen (Death of a Ladies' Man, 1977).

In 1974, Kleinow was briefly part of a new band, Cold Steel, before co-founding the reconstituted Flying Burrito Brothers with original bassist Chris Ethridge later that year. He remained with the band (which also recorded and performed as Sierra) until 1981 before rejoining again from 1984 to 1997. The later iterations of the band enjoyed several minor country hits on Curb Records. His first solo album, Sneaky Pete, was released in 1978 and The Legend and the Legacy followed in 1994.

Following a second stint on Davey and Goliath in 1972, he returned to visual effects in earnest as an animator on Sid and Marty Krofft's Land of the Lost (1974–1976) and created the dinosaurs for the comic film Caveman (1981). He was a co-recipient of the 1983 Primetime Emmy Award for Outstanding Special Visual Effects for his work on the highly successful ABC miniseries The Winds of War. Although often uncredited, Kleinow contributed stop motion and other visual effects to a number of films and miniseries over the next three decades, including Cosmos: A Personal Voyage (1980), The Empire Strikes Back (1980), The Right Stuff (1983), Gremlins (1984), The Terminator (1984), Terminator 2 (1991), Starship Troopers (1997), and Holes (2003) while continuing to work sporadically as a professional musician. He also animated stop motion puppets for the 1994 arcade fighter Primal Rage for Atari and Time Warner Interactive.

In 2000, Kleinow formed a group called Burrito Deluxe (also the name of a 1970 Flying Burrito Brothers album) with Garth Hudson, former organist of The Band, Carlton Moody of the Moody Brothers on lead vocals and guitars, bassist Jeff "Stick" Davis of Amazing Rhythm Aces and drummer Rick Lonow, a latter-day drummer for Poco since 1989 and session player. The group recorded three albums, Georgia Peach, The Whole Enchilada and 2007's Disciples of the Truth, which feature his last studio recordings. Kleinow's last performance was at a 2005 Gram Parsons tribute "Gram Fest" concert in Joshua Tree, California, the town in which Gram Parsons had died.

== Personal life and death ==
Kleinow was married to Ernestine Kleinow for 54 years until his death. They had three sons and two daughters together.

Kleinow died on January 6, 2007, at a convalescent home near the skilled nursing facility in Petaluma, California. Suffering from Alzheimer's disease, he had been living at the facility since 2006.

Three months before his death, local singer songwriter Jan White and bassist Pat Campbell gave Kleinow a final private concert, performing several Gram Parsons songs for him, set in the nursing facility's garden. Kleinow was brought to tears and expressed his joy and gratitude for the special moment.

== Discography ==
For albums by the Flying Burrito Brothers see their discography.

=== Solo projects ===
| Year | Title | Label | Number | Notes |
| 1974 | Cold Steel | Ariola | 87736 | LP |
| 1979 | Sneaky Pete | Rhino | RNLP-70070 | LP |
| 1994 | The Legend and the Legacy | Beautown/Shiloh | 4096 | CD |
| 2001 | Meet Sneaky Pete | Beautown/Shiloh | BEA225002, 2252 | CD |

=== Other appearances ===
Kleinow appears on numerous rock and country-rock albums, including:

- Joe Cocker! - Joe Cocker (1969)
- Through the Morning, Through the Night - Dillard & Clark (1969)
- (Untitled) - The Byrds (1970)
- Suite Steel: The Pedal Steel Guitar Album - Buddy Emmons, Jay Dee Maness, Red Rhodes, Rusty Young - Elektra Records (1970)
- New York City (You're a Woman) - Al Kooper (1971)
- Helen Reddy - Helen Reddy (1971)
- Cold Spring Harbor - Billy Joel (1971)
- Little Feat (album) - Little Feat (1971)
- Linda Ronstadt - Linda Ronstadt (1972)
- Blue - Joni Mitchell (1971)
- Byrdmaniax - The Byrds (1971)
- Jackson Browne - Jackson Browne (1972)
- Sandy - Sandy Denny (1972)
- Waka/Jawaka - Frank Zappa (1972)
- The Lady's Not for Sale - Rita Coolidge (1972)
- Suite for Late Summer - Dion DiMucci (1972)
- Jennifer - Jennifer Warnes (1972)
- The Second Coming - Little Richard (1972)
- No Ordinary Child - Jane Getz (1972)
- Casey Kelly - Casey Kelly (1972)
- For Everyman - Jackson Browne (1973)
- Feeling the Space - Yoko Ono (1973)
- Mind Games - John Lennon (1973)
- Don't Cry Now - Linda Ronstadt (1973)
- The Original Tap Dancing Kid - Jimmie Spheeris (1973)
- Perfect Angel - Minnie Riperton (1974)
- Fulfillingness' First Finale - Stevie Wonder (1974)
- Pussy Cats - Harry Nilsson (1974)
- Heart Like a Wheel - Linda Ronstadt (1974)
- Heroes Are Hard to Find - Fleetwood Mac (1974)
- Kinky Friedman - Kinky Friedman (1974)
- Playing Possum - Carly Simon (1975)
- Ringo's Rotogravure - Ringo Starr (1976)
- White on White - Brian Cadd (1976)
- Death of a Ladies' Man - Leonard Cohen (1977)
- Making a Good Thing Better - Olivia Newton-John (1977)
- Pacific Steel Co. - Steel guitar compilation album, 2 tunes (1978)
- Down on the Farm - Little Feat (1979)
- Town and Country - The Rave-Ups (1985)
- I'm Your Man - Leonard Cohen (1988)
- Don't Explain - Robert Palmer (1990)
- Beth Nielsen Chapman - Beth Nielsen Chapman (1990)
- Shot Forth Self Living - Medicine (1992)
- Come On Feel the Lemonheads - The Lemonheads (1993)
