= White Light (Gene Clark album) =

Studio album by Gene Clark
- Released: August 1971
- Recorded: February–March 1971
- Studios: A&M Studios and Village Recorders, Los Angeles
- Genres: Folk rock; country rock
- Length: 34:34
- Label: A&M
- Producer: Jesse Ed Davis

Gene Clark chronology
Through the Morning, Through the Night (1969)	White Light (1971)	Roadmaster (1973)

White Light (also called Gene Clark) is the second solo album by Gene Clark, former member of The Byrds. It achieved commercial success only in the Netherlands, where rock critics also voted it album of the year.

In June 2018, independent reissue label Intervention Records released White Light on vinyl and as a hybrid CD/SACD.

== Background ==
Clark's backing band on the album included producer and guitarist Jesse Edwin Davis, bassist Chris Ethridge of the Flying Burrito Brothers, organist Michael Utley, along with pianist Ben Sidran and drummer Gary Mallaber, both of the Steve Miller Band. The album was recorded February–March 1971. Although Clark began another album for A&M, the label stopped the sessions before that album was completed. Those tracks were available in the Netherlands on Clark's 1973 album Roadmaster, which was not released in the United States until 1994.

== Reception ==
Professional ratings
Review scores
Source	Rating
AllMusic	4.5/5 stars

Music critic Thom Jurek, writing for AllMusic, wrote that the album "has established itself as one of the greatest singer/songwriter albums ever made... Using melodies mutated out of country, and revealing that he was the original poet and architect of the Byrds' sound on White Light, Clark created a wide open set of tracks that are at once full of space, a rugged gentility, and are harrowingly intimate in places. His reading of Bob Dylan's "Tears of Rage", towards the end of the record rivals, if not eclipses, the Band's. Less wrecked and ravaged, Clark's song is more a bewildered tome of resignation to a present and future in the abyss. Now this is classic rock."

White Light has been included in 1001 Albums You Must Hear Before You Die since the original 2005 edition.

== Track listing ==
All tracks are written by Gene Clark, except where noted.

No.	Title	Writer(s)	Length
1.	"The Virgin"		3:37
2.	"With Tomorrow"	Clark, Jesse Ed Davis	2:25
3.	"White Light"		3:37
4.	"Because of You"		4:02
5.	"One in a Hundred"		3:33
6.	"For a Spanish Guitar"		4:58
7.	"Where My Love Lies Asleep"		4:20
8.	"Tears of Rage"	Bob Dylan, Richard Manuel	4:12
9.	"1975"		3:47

2002 Universal/A&M CD reissue bonus tracks
No.	Title	Writer(s)	Length
10.	"Because of You" (alternate mix)		4:04
11.	"Stand by Me"	Ben E. King, Jerry Leiber, Mike Stoller	2:43
12.	"Ship of the Lord"		2:32
13.	"Opening Day"		4:00
14.	"Winter In"		3:17

== Personnel ==
Musicians

- Gene Clark – vocals, acoustic guitar, harmonica
- Jesse Ed Davis – electric guitar, bottleneck guitar
- John Selk – acoustic guitar
- Chris Ethridge – bass
- Gary Mallaber – drums
- Mike Utley – organ
- Ben Sidran – piano
- Bobbye Hall – congas, percussion

Production

- Jesse Ed Davis – producer, mixing
- Joe Zagarino – engineer
- Baker Bigsby – assistant engineer
