= Through the Morning, Through the Night =

Studio album by Dillard & Clark
- Released: September 1969
- Recorded: March 31 – June 1969
- Studios: A&M, Hollywood (Note: A portion of "Corner Street Bar" was recorded on a reel-to-reel tape recorder at Harry Dean Stanton's home.)
- Genres: Country rock, progressive bluegrass
- Length: 38:45
- Label: A&M
- Producer: Larry Marks

Gene Clark chronology
The Fantastic Expedition of Dillard & Clark (1968)	Through the Morning, Through the Night (1969)	White Light (1971)

Singles from Through the Morning, Through the Night
- 1. "Don't Let Me Down" / "Rocky Top" Released: November 1969

Through the Morning, Through the Night is the second and final album from the country rock duo Dillard & Clark, released in September 1969.

== Background ==
The musicians included country rock and folk rock pioneers Gene Clark, Doug Dillard, Bernie Leadon, Chris Hillman, Sneaky Pete Kleinow, Byron Berline and Michael Clarke. However, the addition of Dillard's girlfriend Donna Washburn as a full-time harmony vocalist (and lead vocalist on "Rocky Top"), replacing Leadon, caused Leadon to leave the group and after a stint in Linda Ronstadt's band The Corvettes join Hillman, Clarke and Kleinow in the Flying Burrito Brothers, although he, Hillman and Kleinow appear as "special pickers" on the album.

The core band on this album included Clark, Dillard, Washburn, David Jackson, fiddler Byron Berline and drummer Jon Corneal, who had quit the Burritos, which made room for Clarke to join them. The large number of cover songs included on the album caused critical reaction to be decidedly less positive than on the prior album. As a result, Gene Clark also left the band after the album. Although Doug Dillard tried to continue the group as the Doug Dillard Expedition, the group soon came to an end.

The tracks "Through the Morning, Through the Night" and "Polly" were covered by Alison Krauss and Robert Plant on their 2007 collaboration Raising Sand.

== Reception ==
Professional ratings
Review scores
Source	Rating
Allmusic	3/5 stars

Music critic Richie Unterberger, writing for Allmusic, called the album "a disappointment in relation to their far more eclectic and original prior effort, The Fantastic Expedition of Dillard & Clark. The primary difference is that whereas the earlier record had leaned on Gene Clark's original compositions, and a reasonably adventurous attitude toward country-rock fusion in general, the follow-up saw them turning into a much more traditional folk/bluegrass act... Taken on its own, it's a fair, pleasant, heavily bluegrass-flavored outing with few surprises."

== Track listing ==
Side one

1. "No Longer a Sweetheart of Mine" (Don Reno, Red Smiley, Fred Swift) – 3:12
2. "Through the Morning, Through the Night" (Gene Clark) – 4:04
3. "Rocky Top" (Boudleaux Bryant, Felice Bryant) – 2:46
4. "So Sad" (Don Everly, Phil Everly) – 3:19
5. "Corner Street Bar" (Gene Clark) – 3:34
6. "I Bowed My Head and Cried Holy" (Traditional; arranged by Dillard & Clark) – 3:31

Side two

1. "Kansas City Southern" (Gene Clark) – 3:39
2. "Four Walls" (George Campbell, Marvin J. Moore) – 3:39
3. "Polly" (Gene Clark) – 4:20
4. "Roll in My Sweet Baby's Arms" (Bill Monroe) – 2:49
5. "Don't Let Me Down" (John Lennon, Paul McCartney) – 3:52

== Personnel ==
According to the album's original liner notes:

- Doug Dillard – vocals, banjo, guitar, fiddle
- Gene Clark – vocals, guitar, harmonica

Additional musicians

- Donna Washburn – guitar, tambourine, vocals
- Byron Berline – fiddle
- Jon Corneal – drums, tambourine
- David Jackson – vocals, bass, piano, cello
- Sneaky Pete Kleinow – pedal steel guitar
- Chris Hillman – mandolin
- Bernie Leadon – guitar, bass

Additional personnel

- Larry Marks – producer
- Dick Bogert and Ray Gerhardt – engineering
- Tom Wilkes – art director
- Jim McCrary – photography

== Sources ==
- Einarson, John (2005). Mr. Tambourine Man: The Life and Legacy of the Byrds' Gene Clark. San Francisco, California: Backbeat Books. ISBN 0-87930-793-5.
