= Gene Clark =

American singer-songwriter (1944–1991)

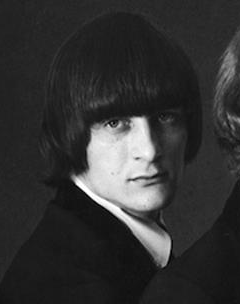
- Clark in 1965

Background information
- Born: Harold Eugene Clark; November 17, 1944; Tipton, Missouri, U.S.
- Died: May 24, 1991 (aged 46) Sherman Oaks, California, U.S.
- Genres: Rock; country rock; folk rock; folk; country; bluegrass; Americana
- Occupations: Musician, singer-songwriter
- Instruments: Vocals; guitar; harmonica; tambourine
- Years active: 1963–1991
- Labels: Columbia; A&M; Asylum; RSO; Capitol; Takoma; Sierra

Harold Eugene Clark (November 17, 1944 – May 24, 1991) was an American singer-songwriter and founding member of the folk rock band the Byrds. He was the Byrds' principal songwriter between 1964 and early 1966, writing most of the band's best-known originals from this period, including "I'll Feel a Whole Lot Better", "She Don't Care About Time", "Eight Miles High" and "Set You Free This Time".

Although he did not enjoy commercial success as a solo artist, Clark was in the vanguard of popular music during much of his career, prefiguring developments in such disparate subgenres as psychedelic rock, baroque pop, newgrass, country rock, and alternative country. He was inducted into the Rock and Roll Hall of Fame in 1991 as a member of the Byrds.

== Early Life ==
Clark was born in Tipton, Missouri, the third of 13 children in a family of Irish, German, and Native American heritage. His family moved to Kansas City, Missouri, where as a boy he began learning to play the guitar and harmonica from his father. He was soon playing Hank Williams tunes as well as songs by early rockers such as Elvis Presley and the Everly Brothers. He began writing songs at the age of 11.

By the time he was 15, he had developed a rich tenor voice, and he formed a local rock and roll combo, Joe Meyers and the Sharks. Like many of his generation, Clark developed an interest in folk music because of the popularity of The Kingston Trio. When he graduated from Bonner Springs High School, in Bonner Springs, Kansas, in 1962, he formed a folk group, the Rum Runners.

== Career ==
=== Formation of the Byrds ===
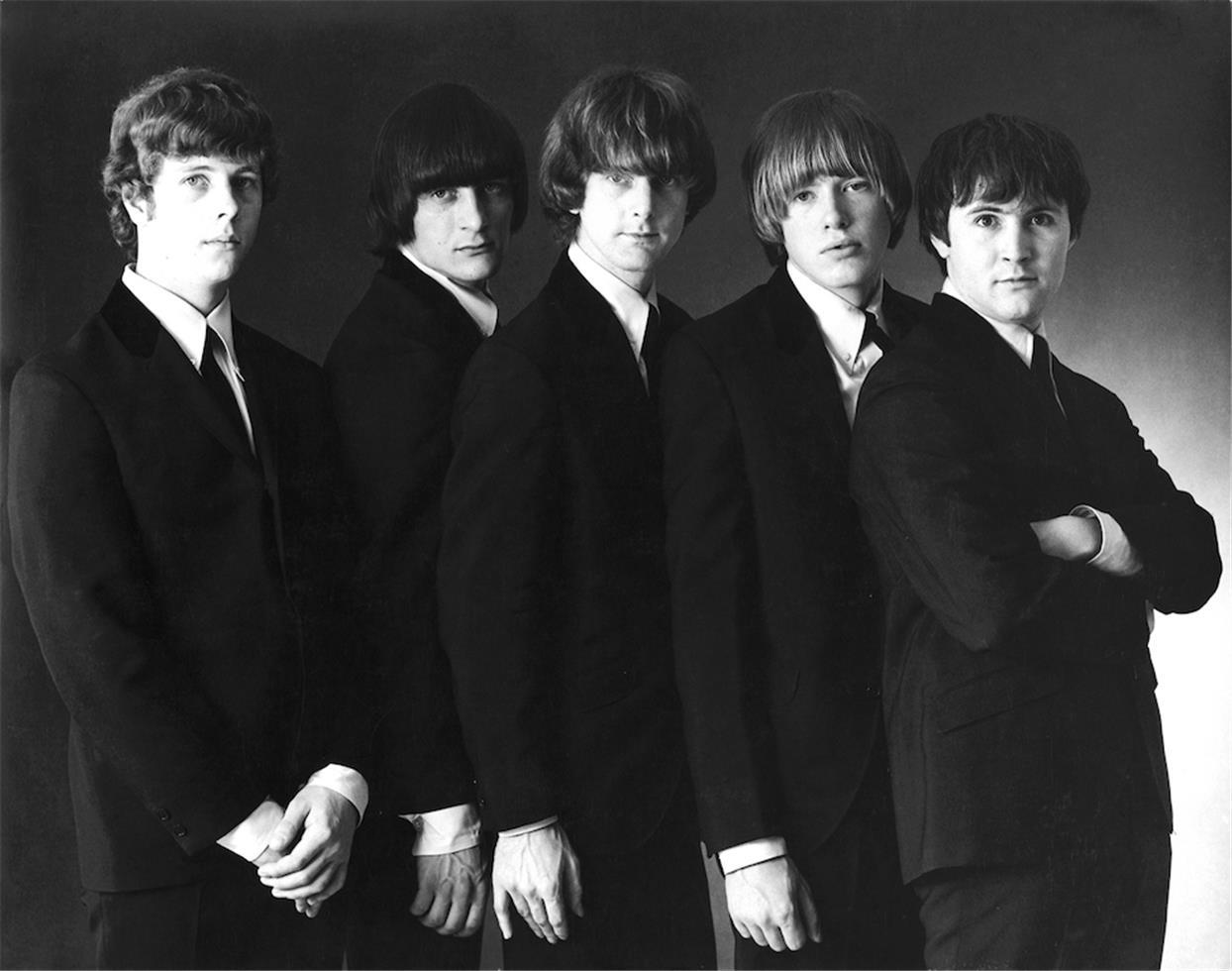
Clark (second from left) as a member of the Byrds in 1965

Clark was invited to join an established regional folk band, the Surf Riders, based in Kansas City at the Castaways Lounge, owned by Hal Harbaum. On August 12, 1963, he was performing with them when he was discovered by the New Christy Minstrels. They hired him, and he recorded two albums with the ensemble before leaving in early 1964. After hearing the Beatles, Clark quit the New Christy Minstrels and moved to Los Angeles, where he met fellow folkie and Beatles convert Jim (later Roger) McGuinn at the Troubadour Club. In early 1964 they began to assemble a band that would become the Byrds.

Clark wrote or co-wrote many of the Byrds' best-known originals from their first three albums, including "I'll Feel a Whole Lot Better", "Set You Free This Time", "Here Without You", "You Won't Have to Cry", "If You're Gone", "The World Turns All Around Her", "She Don't Care About Time" and "Eight Miles High". He initially played rhythm guitar in the band, but relinquished that position to David Crosby and became the tambourine and harmonica player. Bassist Chris Hillman noted years later in an interview remembering Clark, "At one time, he was the power in the Byrds, not McGuinn, not Crosby—it was Gene who would burst through the stage curtain banging on a tambourine, coming on like a young Prince Valiant. A hero, our savior. Few in the audience could take their eyes off this presence. He was the songwriter. He had the 'gift' that none of the rest of us had developed yet.... What deep inner part of his soul conjured up songs like 'Set You Free This Time,' 'I'll Feel A Whole Lot Better,' 'I'm Feelin' Higher,' 'Eight Miles High'? So many great songs! We learned a lot of songwriting from him and in the process learned a little bit about ourselves."

A management decision gave McGuinn the lead vocals for their major singles and Bob Dylan songs. This disappointment, combined with Clark's dislike of traveling (including a chronic fear of flying) and resentment by other band members about the extra income he derived from his songwriting, led to internal squabbling, and he left the group in early 1966. He briefly returned to Kansas City before moving back to Los Angeles to form Gene Clark & the Group with Chip Douglas, Joel Larson, and Bill Rhinehart.

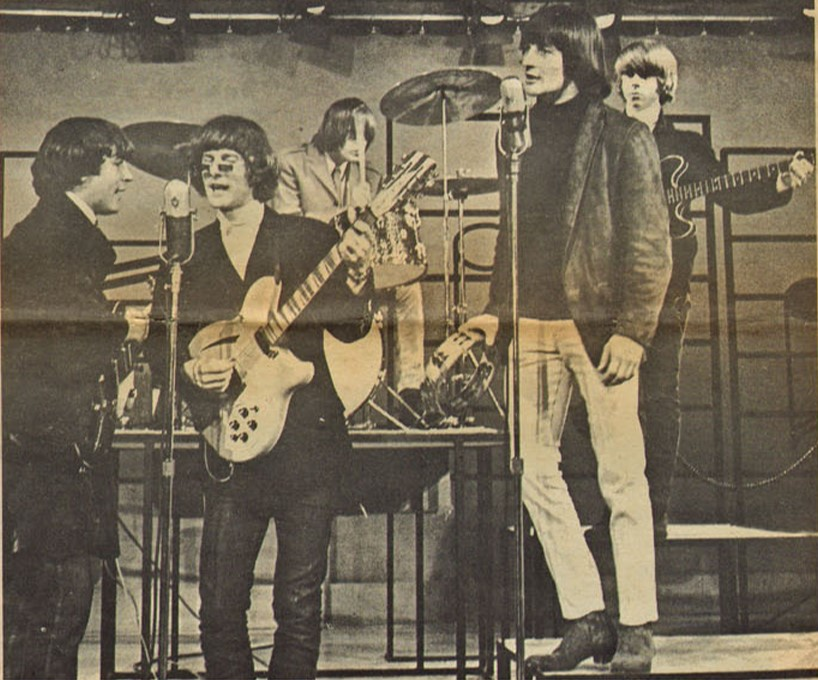
Clark (second from right) singing on stage with the Byrds for The Big T.N.T. Show, November 1965

=== Solo career, brief return to the Byrds and Dillard and Clark ===
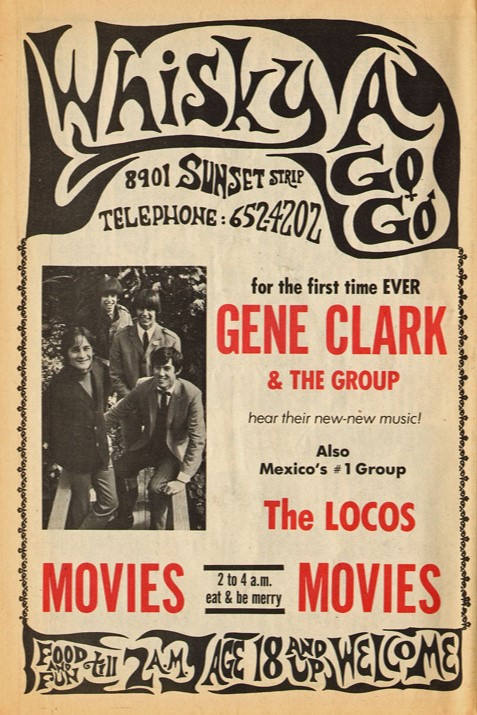
Advertisement for "Gene Clark & the Group" performance at Whisky a Go Go, mid-1966

Columbia Records (the Byrds' record label) signed Clark as a solo artist, and in 1967 he released his first solo album, Gene Clark with the Gosdin Brothers. The Gosdin Brothers were selected to back him because they shared the same manager, Jim Dickson, and because Chris Hillman, who played bass on the album, had worked with the Gosdin Brothers in the mid-1960s when he and they were members of the Southern California bluegrass band the Hillmen. The album was a unique mixture of pop, country rock and baroque psychedelic tracks. It received favorable reviews, but unfortunately for Clark, it was released almost simultaneously with the Byrds' Younger Than Yesterday, also on Columbia, and (partly because of his 18-month absence from public attention) was a commercial failure.

With the future of his solo career in doubt, Clark briefly rejoined the Byrds in October 1967 as a replacement for the recently departed David Crosby; following an anxiety attack in Minneapolis, he left after only three weeks. During this brief period with the Byrds, he appeared with the band on The Smothers Brothers Comedy Hour, lip-synching the group's current single, "Goin' Back"; he also performed "Mr. Spaceman" with the band. Although there is some disagreement among the band's biographers, Clark is generally viewed as having contributed background vocals to the songs "Goin' Back" and "Space Odyssey" for the forthcoming Byrds' album The Notorious Byrd Brothers and was an uncredited co-author, with McGuinn, of "Get to You", also from that album.

In 1968, Clark signed with A&M Records and began a collaboration with the banjo player Doug Dillard. Guitarist Bernie Leadon (later with The Flying Burrito Brothers and The Eagles), bassist Dave Jackson and mandolinist Don Beck joined them to form the nucleus of Dillard & Clark; in addition, Michael Clarke briefly drummed for the group before joining The Flying Burrito Brothers. They produced two albums, The Fantastic Expedition of Dillard & Clark (1968) and Through the Morning, Through the Night (1969).

The Fantastic Expedition of Dillard & Clark was a pivotal work of acoustic country rock. It included such enduring songs as "Train Leaves Here This Morning" (a collaboration between Clark and Leadon prominently covered by the latter in 1972 on The Eagles' debut album) and "She Darked the Sun" (covered by Linda Ronstadt on her 1970 album Silk Purse). In contrast, Through the Morning, Through the Night was more indebted to traditional bluegrass but also employed electric instrumentation. By this juncture, Dillard's girlfriend Donna Washburn had joined the group as a backing vocalist, a factor that precipitated the departure of Leadon. The shift to traditional bluegrass also caused Clark to lose interest. Written by Clark, the title song was used by Quincy Jones in the soundtrack of the 1972 Sam Peckinpah film The Getaway; it was also covered by Robert Plant and Alison Krauss (along with "Polly," another Clark-penned track from the album) on their 2007 album Raising Sand. Both albums by Dillard & Clark fared poorly on the charts, but they are now regarded as seminal exemplars of the country rock and progressive bluegrass genres. The collaboration with Dillard rejuvenated Clark's creativity but greatly contributed to his growing drinking problem. Dillard & Clark disintegrated in late 1969 after the departures of Clark and Leadon. During this period, Clark, Leadon, Jackson and Beck contributed to the debut album of Steve Young, Rock Salt & Nails, released in November 1969.

In 1970, Clark began work on a new single, recording two tracks with the original members of the Byrds (each recording his part separately). The resulting songs, "She's the Kind of Girl" and "One in a Hundred", were not released at the time, because of legal problems; they were included later on the 1973 album Roadmaster. In 1970 and 1971, Clark contributed vocals and two compositions ("Tried So Hard" and "Here Tonight") to albums by the Flying Burrito Brothers.

Frustrated with the music industry, Clark bought a house in Albion, California and married former go-go dancer and Bell Records production assistant Carlie Lynn McCummings in June 1970, with whom he had two sons (Kelly and Kai Clark). In semi-retirement, he subsisted on his still-substantial Byrds royalties throughout the early 1970s, augmented by income from The Turtles' 1969 American Top Ten hit "You Showed Me", a previously unreleased composition by McGuinn and Clark from 1964 rearranged for the band by Chip Douglas.

=== White Light and Roadmaster ===
In 1971, Clark released his second solo album, White Light (the title was not on the cover sleeve, and thus some later reviewers mistakenly assumed that the title was Gene Clark). The album was produced by the Native American guitarist Jesse Ed Davis, with whom Clark developed a great rapport, partly due to their common ancestry. An intimate, poetic and mostly acoustic work supplemented by Davis's slide guitar, the album contained many introspective tracks, such as "With Tomorrow", "Because of You", "Where My Love Lies Asleep" and "For a Spanish Guitar" (which Bob Dylan reportedly hailed as one of the greatest songs ever written). All of the material was written by Clark, with the exception of Bob Dylan and Richard Manuel's "Tears of Rage". Launched to considerable critical acclaim, the album failed to gain commercial success, except in the Netherlands, where it was voted album of the year by rock music critics. Once more, modest promotion and Clark's refusal to undertake promotional touring adversely affected sales.

In the spring of 1971, Clark was commissioned by Dennis Hopper to contribute the tracks "American Dreamer" and "Outlaw Song" to American Dreamer, a documentary that chronicled the fractious editing process of The Last Movie. A rerecorded, longer version of the song "American Dreamer" was later used in the 1977 film The Farmer, along with an instrumental version of the same song plus "Outside the Law (The Outlaw)", a re-recording of "Outlaw Song".

In 1972, Clark attempted to record a follow-up album. Progress was slow and expensive, and A&M terminated the project before completion. The resulting eight tracks, including "Full Circle Song" and "In a Misty Morning", along with those recorded with the Byrds in 1970 and 1971 ("She's the Kind of Girl" and "One in a Hundred") and with the Flying Burrito Brothers ("Here Tonight"), were released in 1973 as Roadmaster in the Netherlands only.

=== Byrds ===
Clark left A&M in late 1972 to join a reunion of the original five Byrds. They cut the album Byrds, which was released in March 1973 by Asylum Records. While the album charted relatively well (U.S. No. 20), its placement did not live up to the label's initial expectations in the wake of the recent success of Crosby (Crosby, Stills, Nash & Young) and Hillman (a member of Stephen Stills's band Manassas). Clark's compositions "Full Circle" and "Changing Heart" and the Neil Young covers on which he sang the lead vocal ("See the Sky About to Rain" and "Cowgirl in the Sand") were widely regarded as the standout tracks on the critically divisive album. Disheartened by the bad reviews and unhappy with Crosby's performance as the record's producer, the group members chose to dissolve the band. Clark briefly joined McGuinn's solo group, with which he premiered "Silver Raven", arguably his most celebrated post-Byrds song.

=== No Other ===
On the basis of the quality of Clark's contributions to Byrds, David Geffen signed him to Asylum Records in early 1974. The label was the home of the most prominent exponents of the singer-songwriter movement of the era and carried the kind of hip cachet that Clark hadn't experienced since his days with the Byrds. While composing the album, he spent long periods with a notebook and an acoustic guitar at the picture window of his home, deriving inspiration from staring at the Pacific Ocean.

Produced by Thomas Jefferson Kaye with a vast array of session musicians (including members of The Section and the Allman Brothers Band) and backing singers, the ensuing No Other fused elements of country rock, folk, gospel, soul and choral music with poetic, mystical lyrics. Although the album was praised by critics, its unconventional arrangements (which anticipated the later innovations of Lindsey Buckingham, Stevie Nicks and Christine McVie) limited public appeal. Furthermore, its high production costs (exceeding $100,000) prompted Geffen to publicly berate Clark and Kaye. The album was minimally promoted and stalled in the Billboard album chart at No. 144. In 2013, members of the bands Beach House, The Walkmen, Grizzly Bear, and Fleet Foxes performed the album in its entirety in a series of concerts.

Clark's return to Los Angeles to record the album resulted in his reversion to a hedonistic lifestyle and accelerated the disintegration of his marriage. Disillusioned by professional and marital failure, he mounted his first solo tour by road, playing colleges and clubs with Roger White (lead guitar and backing vocals) and Duke Bardwell (electric bass, backing vocals and acoustic guitar); the drumless trio was billed as Gene Clark and the Silverados.

In 2019, a remastered/remixed version of No Other was released.

=== Two Sides to Every Story ===
After the commercial failure of No Other, Clark was confused about his artistic direction. Throughout 1975 and 1976, he had hinted to the press that he was assembling a set of "cosmic" songs fusing country rock with R&B and funk, elaborating on the soundscapes of his most recent album. In 1976, he recorded a set of ten demos that combined country and folk music with a light touch of cosmic consciousness. These were submitted to RSO Records, which promptly bought out Clark's Asylum contract and issued the long-gestating Two Sides to Every Story in 1977. The album—a melange of bluegrass, traditional honky tonk, echoes of No Other ("Sister Moon") and strident country rock (a new arrangement of "Kansas City Southern")—was produced by Kaye with an understated touch.

The emotional fallout from his divorce is reflected in the album title and several of Clark's compositions, including the aforementioned "Sister Moon", "Lonely Saturday", "Past Addresses", "Silent Crusade" and "Hear the Wind". The album also contains covers of the traditional "In the Pines" (a key component of Clark's live repertoire with the Silverados) and "Give My Love to Marie" by James Talley. Once again, his style of sensitive balladry failed to achieve success on the U.S. charts. In a belated attempt to find an appreciative public, he reluctantly overcame his travel anxiety and launched an international promotional tour with the KC Southern Band. Some six weeks before his death in 1991, Clark told interviewer Bill Wasserzieher that he considered Two Sides to Every Story his best album, rivaled only by No Other.

=== McGuinn, Clark & Hillman ===
For his British tour dates, Clark found himself on the same bill as ex-Byrds Roger McGuinn and Chris Hillman, each fronting their own bands. Shortly after returning to the United States, Clark and McGuinn began touring as an acoustic duo. After Hillman joined his former bandmates, the reformed trio named themselves McGuinn, Clark & Hillman and signed with Capitol Records. Produced by the Albert Brothers (who had recently recorded Crosby, Stills & Nash's 1977 comeback album), the ensuing McGuinn, Clark & Hillman (1979) was a rebirth in both performing and songwriting for Clark, who ensconced himself as the group's dominant creative force. He wrote four songs for the album, including "Backstage Pass" (a rumination on the ennui of touring and his fear of flying), "Release Me Girl" (a disco-inflected collaboration with Thomas Jefferson Kaye), the UFO-inspired "Feelin' Higher" and "Little Mama".

Many critics felt that the album's slick production and disco-influenced soft rock rhythms didn't flatter the group, but the album reached No. 39 on the Billboard 200 (underpinned by the McGuinn-penned "Don't You Write Her Off", which peaked at No. 33 in May 1979) and earned a RIAA gold certification, selling well enough to generate a follow-up. McGuinn, Clark and Hillman's second release was to have been a full group effort entitled City; although it was ultimately released in 1980, a combination of Clark's unreliability (including experimentation with heroin) and his dissatisfaction with their musical direction (mostly regarding Ron and Howard Albert's production) resulted in the album being credited to "Roger McGuinn & Chris Hillman featuring Gene Clark." Despite the turmoil, Clark penned the song "Won't Let You Down". By 1981, Clark had left, and the group recorded one more album as "McGuinn/Hillman".

=== Rehabilitation, Firebyrd and So Rebellious a Lover ===
Clark moved to Hawaii with Jesse Ed Davis to try to overcome his drug dependency, remaining there until the end of 1981. Upon his return to Los Angeles, he assembled a new band, the Firebyrds, and in 1982 proceeded to record what would eventually become the album Firebyrd. While waiting for the album to be released, Clark joined up with Chris Hillman and others in an abortive venture called Flyte, which failed to secure a recording contract and was quickly dissolved. The eventual release of Firebyrd in 1984 coincided with the emergence of jangle rockers like R.E.M. and Tom Petty, who had sparked a new interest in the Byrds. Clark also began developing new fans among LA's roots-conscious Paisley Underground scene.

On 19 May 1985 Clark and musical friends performed at 3-T's in Evansville, Indiana. The ensemble was made up of Gene Clark on guitar and vocals, Michael Clarke on drums, Rick Danko on bass, guitar and vocals, Richard Manuel on keyboards and vocals, John York on bass, guitar and vocals, Blondie Chaplin on guitar and vocals, and Rick Roberts on vocals. The performance was recorded and was unofficially released on the bootleg album, A Star for Every Stage, credited to Gene Clark & Friends.

Later in the decade, he embraced his new status by appearing as a guest with the Long Ryders, in a session arranged by Saul Davis and he cut an acclaimed duo album with Carla Olson of the Textones titled So Rebellious a Lover (including the notable "Gypsy Rider" and "Del Gato") in 1986. The album included contributions from Chris Hillman, Stephen McCarthy (of The Long Ryders) and Randy Fuller (of the Bobby Fuller Four) and was produced and arranged by session drummer Michael Huey.

=== Later career ===
In 1985, Clark approached McGuinn, Crosby and Hillman regarding a reformation of the Byrds in time for the 20th anniversary of the release of "Mr. Tambourine Man". The three of them showed no interest. Clark decided to assemble a "superstar" collection of musicians, including ex-Flying Burrito Brothers and Firefall member Rick Roberts, ex-Beach Boys singer and guitarist Blondie Chaplin, ex-Band members Rick Danko and Richard Manuel, and ex-Byrds Michael Clarke and John York. Clark initially called his band "The 20th Anniversary Tribute to the Byrds" and began performing on the lucrative nostalgia circuit in early 1985. A number of concert promoters began to shorten the band's name to "the Byrds" in advertisements and promotional material.

As the band continued to tour throughout 1985, their agent decided to shorten the name to "the Byrds" permanently, to the displeasure of McGuinn, Crosby and Hillman. Clark eventually discontinued performing with his own "Byrds" band, but drummer Clarke continued on with Skip Battin (occasionally with ex-Byrds York and Gene Parsons), forming another "Byrds" group, prompting McGuinn, Hillman, and Crosby to go on the road as "the Byrds" in an attempt to establish a claim to the rights to the name. Their effort failed this time; Clark was not included in the reunion, primarily because of his involvement with the act that didn't include them. Crosby finally secured rights to the name in 2002.

Despite the critical success of So Rebellious a Lover, which led to several TV appearances (including Nashville Now), Clark was increasingly afflicted with serious health problems, including ulcers and alcohol dependence. In 1988, he underwent surgery to remove a malignancy.

A period of abstinence and recovery followed until Tom Petty covered "I'll Feel a Whole Lot Better" on Full Moon Fever (1989), yielding a windfall of royalties from the album (which peaked at No. 3 in the United States) to Clark. Flush with money, he began to neglect his professional obligations. Although the circumstances remain nebulous (with Carla Olson citing alleged financial improprieties), the binge also precipitated his final break-up with Terri Messina, who had had a two-decade on-again, off-again relationship with Clark.

During this period, The Byrds set aside their differences long enough to appear together at their induction into the Rock and Roll Hall of Fame in January 1991, at which the original lineup performed several songs together, including Clark's "I'll Feel a Whole Lot Better".

== Illness and death ==
Clark's health continued to decline as his substance abuse accelerated, and he was diagnosed with throat cancer in early 1991. He died that same year, on May 24, at the age of 46 from heart disease as a result of a bleeding ulcer. Drug and alcohol addiction were determined to have contributed to his death. He was buried at St. Andrews Catholic Cemetery in Tipton, Missouri, beneath an epitaph that reads "No Other."

== Covers and tribute songs ==
During his career and after his death, Clark's songs have been covered by a number of artists. Iain Matthews was an early promoter of Clark's songs, covering "Polly" on his 1972 album Journeys from Gospel Oak and "Tried So Hard" on his 1974 album Some Days You Eat the Bear. "Tried So Hard" was later covered by Yo la Tengo on Fakebook in 1990. Death in Vegas and Paul Weller covered his song "So You Say You Lost Your Baby" on their 2003 album Scorpio Rising. In 1993 the Scottish band Teenage Fanclub recorded a tribute entitled "Gene Clark" on their album Thirteen.

In 2007, two of his songs were recorded by Alison Krauss and Robert Plant on the T-Bone Burnett–produced Raising Sand: "Polly Come Home" and "Through the Morning, Through the Night." Also in 2007, Chris and Rich Robinson released a live version of "Polly" on their album Brothers of a Feather: Live at the Roxy. This Mortal Coil covered "Strength of Strings" from his album No Other and "With Tomorrow" from his album White Light. Soulsavers with Mark Lanegan recorded a version of "Some Misunderstanding" from No Other on their 2009 release, Broken. The song "Gorgeous" from Kanye West's 2010 album My Beautiful Dark Twisted Fantasy is based on elements of The Turtles' cover of "You Showed Me".

== Documentary ==
A documentary about Clark's life and career, entitled The Byrd Who Flew Alone, was released in 2013, featuring contributions from family, friends, the three surviving original members of the Byrds, latter-day Byrd John York and late-era collaborators Carla Olson and Pat Robinson. The documentary revealed that Clark was suffering from throat cancer at the time of his death.

== Discography ==
=== Solo albums ===
- Gene Clark with the Gosdin Brothers (aka Echoes) (1967)
- White Light (1971)
- Collector's Series – Early L.A. Sessions (1972)
- Roadmaster (1973)
- No Other (1974)
- Two Sides to Every Story (1977)
- Firebyrd (1984)
- Gypsy Angel – The Gene Clark Demos 1983–1990 (2001)
- Under the Silvery Moon (2003)
- Silverado Live & Unreleased (2008)
- Here Tonight – The White Light Demos (2013)
- Back Street Mirror (2018)
- The Lost Studio Sessions 1964–1982 (2016)
- Gene Clark Sings For You (2018)

=== Collaborations ===
- The Fantastic Expedition of Dillard & Clark (1968; with Doug Dillard)
- Through the Morning Through the Night (1969; with Doug Dillard)
- McGuinn, Clark & Hillman (1979; with Roger McGuinn and Chris Hillman)
- City (1980; with Roger McGuinn and Chris Hillman)
- So Rebellious a Lover (1987; with Carla Olson)
- Silhouetted in Light – Live in Concert (1992; with Carla Olson)
