= The Fantastic Expedition of Dillard & Clark =

Studio album by Dillard & Clark
- Released: October 1968
- Recorded: June – October 1, 1968
- Studios: A&M, Hollywood
- Genres: Country rock, progressive bluegrass
- Length: 28:49
- Label: A&M
- Producer: Larry Marks

Gene Clark chronology
Gene Clark with the Gosdin Brothers (1967)	The Fantastic Expedition of Dillard & Clark (1968)	Through the Morning, Through the Night (1969)

Singles from The Fantastic Expedition of Dillard & Clark
- 1. "Out on the Side" / "Train Leaves Here This Morning" Released: November 1968; 2. "Lyin' Down the Middle" / "Don't Be Cruel" Released: February 1969; 3. "Why Not Your Baby" / "The Radio Song" Released: May 1969

The Fantastic Expedition of Dillard & Clark is a country rock album by Dillard & Clark. A&M Records issued the album in the US in October 1968, and its release in the UK followed in July 1969. The album was recorded in 1968, shortly after Gene Clark had departed the Byrds for the second time and after Doug Dillard left the Dillards.

== Background ==
Clark's debut solo album, Gene Clark with the Gosdin Brothers, had been a commercial failure. After the dismissal of David Crosby from the Byrds, Clark had rejoined his previous band, but after performing only three shows, he left the tour due to his anxieties and fear of flying. He then signed with A&M Records and began sessions for his debut album on his new label with instrumentalist Douglas Dillard. Bernie Leadon co-wrote six of the songs and also performed on the album. Due to Clark's refusal to tour, a short series of shows at The Troubadour in Los Angeles was the only promotion for the album and, as a result, it too was a commercial failure.

== Reception ==
Professional ratings
Review scores
Source	Rating
AllMusic	5/5 stars
Rolling Stone	(positive)

Music critic Matthew Greenwald, writing for AllMusic, called the album "perhaps [Clark's] most brilliant recording... Graceful, spellbinding, and tasteful all at the same time. Absolutely essential."

== Track listing ==
Side One:

1. "Out on the Side" (Gene Clark) – 3:49
2. "She Darked the Sun" (Clark, Bernie Leadon) – 3:10
3. "Don't Come Rollin'" (Clark, Doug Dillard, Leadon) – 2:54
4. "Train Leaves Here This Morning" (Clark, Leadon) – 3:49

Side Two:

1. "With Care from Someone" (Clark, Dillard, Leadon) – 3:49
2. "The Radio Song" (Clark, Leadon) – 3:01
3. "Git It On Brother (Git In Line Brother)" (Lester Flatt) – 2:51
4. "In the Plan" (Clark, Dillard, Leadon) – 2:08
5. "Something's Wrong" (Clark, Dillard) – 2:57

The following bonus tracks have been included on CD reissues of the album:

- "Why Not Your Baby" (Clark) – 3:41
- "Lyin' Down the Middle" (Laramy Smith, Clark) – 2:17
- "Don't Be Cruel" (Elvis Presley, Otis Blackwell) – 1:53

== Personnel ==
Adapted from Discogs.

- Gene Clark – guitar, harmonica, vocals
- Doug Dillard – banjo, fiddle, guitar, vocals
- Bernie Leadon – banjo, guitar, vocals
- David Jackson – double bass
- Donald Beck – mandolin, fretted Dobro
- Andrew Belling – electric harpsichord (5, 6, 8)
- Chris Hillman – mandolin (7, 9)
- Joel Larson – drums (1)

=== Production ===
- Larry Marks – producer
- Dick Bogert – recording engineer
- Tom Wilkes – art direction
- Guy Webster, Homer E. Dillard Jr. – photography
- Bob Garcia – liner notes
