= Mr. Tambourine Man (album) =

Studio album by the Byrds
- Released: June 21, 1965
- Recorded: January 20, March 8 – April 22, 1965
- Studios: Columbia, Hollywood
- Genre: Folk rock
- Length: 31:35
- Label: Columbia
- Producer: Terry Melcher

The Byrds chronology
Mr. Tambourine Man (1965)	Turn! Turn! Turn! (1965)

Singles from Mr. Tambourine Man
- 1. "Mr. Tambourine Man" / "I Knew I'd Want You" Released: April 12, 1965; 2. "All I Really Want to Do" / "I'll Feel a Whole Lot Better" Released: June 14, 1965

Alternate cover
- Cover of the 1974 Embassy Records reissue (Note: The 1974 Embassy Records reissue erroneously misspells Gene Clark's name as "H.Clark", on the self-penned compositions, co-written with McGuinn, "You Won't Have to Cry" and "It's No Use". The H could possibly allude to Harold, which was Clark's first name (he was born Harold Eugene Clark).)

Mr. Tambourine Man is the debut studio album by the American rock band the Byrds, released on June 21, 1965, by Columbia Records. The album is characterized by the Byrds' signature sound of Jim McGuinn's (Note: Roger McGuinn was born James Joseph McGuinn III and initially used the name Jim McGuinn in his professional music career. He changed his first name to Roger in 1967, during his involvement with Subud, an international spiritual movement.) 12-string Rickenbacker guitar and the band's harmonies. The material on the album consists of cover versions of folk songs, primarily composed by Bob Dylan, and originals written or co-written by singer Gene Clark. Along with the Dylan-penned single of the same name, Mr. Tambourine Man established the band as an internationally successful act and is widely regarded by critics as representing the first effective American challenge to the chart dominance of the Beatles and other British Invasion bands during the mid-1960s.

The album was influential in popularizing the musical subgenre known as folk rock, by melding sophisticated lyrical content with electric guitars and a rock backbeat. The term "folk rock" was coined by the American music press to describe the Byrds' sound in mid-1965, around the same time that the album was released. The band's hybrid of a British Invasion beat, jangly guitar playing, and poetic or socially conscious lyrics influenced a number of acts in the mid-1960s and has also been influential on later musicians.

The album peaked at number 6 on the Billboard Top LPs chart and number 7 on the UK Albums Chart. It is the band's most successful album on either chart. The "Mr. Tambourine Man" single was released ahead of the album in April 1965 and reached number one on the Billboard Hot 100 and the UK Singles Chart. A second single, "All I Really Want to Do", also a Dylan cover, was moderately successful in the U.S., but fared better in the UK, where it reached the top ten.

== Background and recording ==
Before forming the Byrds in 1964, most of the band members had come from a folk and roots music background, rather than a rock and roll one. Lead guitarist Jim McGuinn had been a solo folk singer and sideman with various professional folk groups. So too had singer and songwriter Gene Clark and the band's rhythm guitarist David Crosby. Bassist Chris Hillman's musical background also encompassed folk, but was more oriented towards bluegrass music.

Clark and McGuinn first met in early 1964 at The Troubadour folk club in Los Angeles and formed a duo, playing Beatles' covers, Beatlesque renditions of traditional folk songs, and some self-penned material. The duo soon added Crosby to the line-up and named themselves the Jet Set. Over the coming months, Hillman and drummer Michael Clarke were added to the Jet Set and the band signed to Columbia Records on November 10, 1964. They changed their name to the Byrds over Thanksgiving that year.

On January 20, 1965, the band entered Columbia Recording Studios in Hollywood to record the then-unreleased Bob Dylan song "Mr. Tambourine Man" as their debut single. Record producer Terry Melcher felt that the band hadn't completely gelled yet musically, so he brought in a group of L.A. session musicians, later known as the Wrecking Crew, to provide the musical backing on the single. As a result, McGuinn was the only Byrd to play on "Mr. Tambourine Man" and its Clark-penned B-side, "I Knew I'd Want You". The single was released in April 1965 and was an immediate hit, reaching number 1 on both the U.S. Billboard Hot 100 chart and the UK Singles Chart. In addition, the electric rock band treatment that the Byrds and Melcher had given "Mr. Tambourine Man" effectively created the template for the musical subgenre of folk rock.

Although the band's musicianship improved following the recording of their debut single, it was assumed by both Columbia and the band's management that their entire debut album would be recorded with session musicians. The band, however, had other ideas and insisted that they be allowed to perform the album's instrumental accompaniment themselves. By the start of recording sessions for the album, Melcher felt satisfied that the group had polished their sound enough to be able to produce professional-sounding backing tracks and the Byrds were allowed to record the rest of the Mr. Tambourine Man album without any help from session musicians. However, a persistent and widely circulated rumor about the album is that all of the playing on it was done by session musicians (a misconception that is likely due to confusion between the "Mr. Tambourine Man" single and the album of the same name). Hillman has stated in interview that the contrast between the more polished sound of the two tracks featuring session musicians ("Mr. Tambourine Man" and "I Knew I'd Want You") and the sound of the rest of the album is quite noticeable. Recording was completed on April 22, 1965.

== Music ==
For the most part, Mr. Tambourine Man consisted of two types of songs: band originals, primarily penned by Clark, who was the group's main songwriter during its first eighteen months of existence, and covers of then-modern folk songs, composed primarily by Dylan. The album opens with the Dylan-penned title track, which had been a big international hit for the group, prior to the album's release. Band biographer Johnny Rogan has stated that the two most distinctive features of the Byrds' rendition of "Mr. Tambourine Man" are the vocal harmonies of Clark, McGuinn, and Crosby, and McGuinn's jangling twelve-string Rickenbacker guitar playing (which complemented the phrase "jingle jangle morning" found in the song's lyric). This combination of 12-string guitar work and complex harmony singing became the band's signature sound during their early period. Music critic Richie Unterberger has also commented that the success of the Byrds' version of "Mr. Tambourine Man" saw an explosion of Byrds imitators and emulators with hits on the American and British charts during 1965 and 1966.

Another Dylan cover, "All I Really Want to Do", was the first song to be recorded for the album, following the "Mr. Tambourine Man" and "I Knew I'd Want You" session. Melcher felt confident that the band's then-unissued debut single would be, at the very least, a regional hit, so he brought the Byrds back into the studio on March 8, 1965, to record a follow-up. This March 8 recording session yielded the version of "All I Really Want to Do" that appears on the album, but the song was re-recorded on April 14, and it was this later take that graced the A-side of the band's second Columbia single release.

Another cover that stressed the band's folk music roots was Idris Davies and Pete Seeger's "The Bells of Rhymney". The song, which told the sorrowful tale of a coal mining disaster in Wales, was a relative newcomer to the band's repertoire at the time of recording, having only been worked up in March 1965, during the Byrds' residency at Ciro's nightclub on the Sunset Strip. Rogan has written that although the song had a somewhat sombre theme, it became one of the band's most popular numbers during their residency at Ciro's. The band's version of "The Bells of Rhymney" was also influential on the Beatles, particularly George Harrison, who co-opted McGuinn's guitar riff and incorporated it into his composition "If I Needed Someone" from the Rubber Soul album.

I'll Feel a Whole Lot Better
An excerpt from the Gene Clark-penned "I'll Feel a Whole Lot Better", highlighting the song's use of criss-crossing vocals, with Clark on the lead and Jim McGuinn and David Crosby providing backing vocals.

Of the band originals, three were penned solely by Clark. The first of these, "I'll Feel a Whole Lot Better", has been described by Rogan as an uptempo song, with pounding tambourine, jangling Rickenbacker, and criss-crossing vocals, featuring Clark singing lead, while McGuinn and Crosby provided backing vocals. The song bore a passing resemblance to the Searchers' 1963 hit "Needles and Pins" and has, since its release, become a rock music standard, inspiring several cover versions over the years.

Clark's melancholy, mid-tempo ballad "Here Without You" details a bittersweet trip through the city during which every landmark and physical object reminds the singer of an absent lover, while the aforementioned "I Knew I'd Want You" is a Beatlesque minor key 6/8 shuffle recounting the first flushes of romance. Although "I Knew I'd Want You" had been recorded as the intended B-side of the Byrds' debut single, Rogan has pointed out that, had the band failed to secure permission to release their version of "Mr. Tambourine Man" from Dylan and his manager Albert Grossman, "I Knew I'd Want You" might well have been issued as the group's first Columbia A-side. Another two songs on the album were co-written by Clark and McGuinn: "You Won't Have to Cry", which featured a lyric concerned with a woman who has been wronged in love, and "It's No Use", which anticipated the harder-edged, psychedelic sound the band would begin to explore towards the end of 1965 and throughout 1966.

The band also covered two non-folk songs on the album: "Don't Doubt Yourself, Babe" by Jackie DeShannon, who was an early supporter of the band, and Vera Lynn's World War II era standard, "We'll Meet Again". In Rogan's opinion, the band gave the latter song a very sardonic reading, influenced by its appearance in the final scene of Stanley Kubrick's movie Dr. Strangelove. This treatment of "We'll Meet Again", sequenced at the end of the album, began a tradition of closing the Byrds' albums with a tongue-in-cheek or unusual track, a policy that would be repeated on several subsequent LPs.

== Album cover ==
The album's distinctive front cover fisheye lens photograph of the band was taken by Barry Feinstein at the bird sanctuary in Griffith Park, Los Angeles. According to author Christopher Hjort, it has become an acknowledged classic since its release. The back cover featured liner notes, written in the form of an open letter to a friend, by Columbia Records' publicist Billy James. In addition, the back cover also featured a black and white photograph, taken by the Byrds' manager Jim Dickson, of the band on stage with Bob Dylan at Ciro's nightclub in L.A.

== Release and reception ==
Professional ratings
Review scores
Source	Rating
Record Mirror	2/5 stars
AllMusic	5/5 stars

Mr. Tambourine Man was released on June 21, 1965, in the United States (catalogue item CL 2372 in mono, CS 9172 in stereo) and August 20, 1965, in the UK (catalogue item BPG 62571 in mono, SBPG 62571 in stereo). It peaked at number 6 on the Billboard Top LPs chart, during a chart stay of 38 weeks, and reached number 7 in the United Kingdom, spending a total of 12 weeks on the UK albums chart. The preceding single of the same name was released on April 12, 1965, in the U.S. and May 15, 1965, in the UK, reaching number 1 on both the Billboard Hot 100 and the UK Singles Chart. A second single taken from the album, "All I Really Want to Do", peaked at number 40 on the Billboard Hot 100, but fared better in the United Kingdom, where it reached number 4.

Upon release, critical reaction to the album was almost universally positive, with Billboard magazine noting that "the group has successfully combined folk material with pop-dance beat arrangements. Pete Seeger's "The Bells of Rhymney" is a prime example of the new interpretations of folklore." In its July 1965 issue, Time magazine praised the album, stating: "To make folk music the music of today's folk, this quintet has blended Beatle beats with Lead Belly laments, created a halfway school of folk-rock that scores at the cash box if not with the folk purists." In the UK, NME described the band and its debut album by noting that "They look like a rock group but are really a fine folk unit. They play their stringed instruments with great skill and invention against the rock-steady drumming. Their voices merge well ... As the first group to bridge the gap between beat and folk, they deserve to be winners." The UK publication Music Echo was also enthusiastic about the album's contents, concluding that the record was "an album which easily lives up to the promise of their great knock-out singles".

However, not all reviews of the album were positive. Record Mirror in the UK awarded the album two stars out of five, deriding it as "The same nothingy vocals, the same jangly guitar, the same plodding beat on almost every track. The Byrds really must try to get some different sounds." In addition, the abundance of Dylan material on the album—with three songs taken from the Another Side of Bob Dylan album alone—led to accusations of the band being too reliant on his material. Nonetheless, the Dylan covers, including "Chimes of Freedom", "All I Really Want to Do", "Spanish Harlem Incident", and "Mr. Tambourine Man", remain among the Byrds' best-known recordings.

In more recent years, Richie Unterberger, writing for the AllMusic website, said of the album: "One of the greatest debuts in the history of rock, Mr. Tambourine Man was nothing less than a significant step in the evolution of rock & roll itself, demonstrating that intelligent lyrical content could be wedded to compelling electric guitar riffs and a solid backbeat."

=== Remix information ===
The album was one of four Byrds albums that were remastered at 20-bit resolution and partially remixed as part of the Columbia/Legacy Byrds reissue series. This release of the album was issued on April 30, 1996, and had six bonus tracks: the outtakes "She Has a Way" and "You and Me", three alternate versions of songs found on the original album, and the single version of "All I Really Want to Do".

The reason for remixing some of the album was explained by Bob Irwin (who produced these re-issues for compact disc) during an interview:

The first four Byrds albums had sold so well, and the master tapes used so much that they were at least two, if not three generations down from the original. In most cases, a first-generation master no longer existed. They were basically played to death; they were worn out, there was nothing left of them.

He further stated:

Each album is taken from the original multi-tracks, where they exist, which is in 95% of the cases. We remixed them exactly as they were, without taking any liberties, except for the occasional song appearing in stereo for the first time.

Many fans enjoy the remixed album because it's very close to the original mix in most cases and offers noticeably better sound quality.

== Legacy ==
The "Mr. Tambourine Man" single and album instantly established the band on both sides of the Atlantic, challenging the dominance of the Beatles and the British Invasion. The releases also introduced the new genre of folk rock, with the U.S. music press first using the term to describe the Byrds' blend of beat music and folk at roughly the same time as the band's debut single peaked at number 1. Some critics, including Richie Unterberger and Burt Robert, have opined that, although the roots of folk rock were to be found in the American folk music revival of the early 1960s, the Animals' recording of "The House of the Rising Sun", and the twelve-string guitar jangle of the Searchers and the Beatles, it was the Byrds who first melded these elements into a unified whole.

In the months following the release of the Mr. Tambourine Man album, many acts began to imitate the Byrds' hybrid of a British Invasion beat, jangly guitar playing, and poetic or socially conscious lyrics. The band's influence can be heard in many recordings released by American acts in 1965 and 1966, including the Turtles, Simon & Garfunkel, the Lovin' Spoonful, Barry McGuire, the Mamas & the Papas, Jefferson Airplane, We Five, Love, and Sonny & Cher. This jangly, folk rock sound that was pioneered by the Byrds on Mr. Tambourine Man has also been influential on successive generations of rock and pop musicians, including such acts as Big Star, Tom Petty and the Heartbreakers, R.E.M., the Church, Hüsker Dü, the Long Ryders, the Smiths, the Bangles, the Stone Roses, the La's, Teenage Fanclub, the Bluetones, Wilco, and Delays, among others.

In 2003, the album was ranked at number 232 on Rolling Stone magazine's list of the 500 Greatest Albums of All Time; it was 233 in the 2012 revision of the list and 287 in the 2020 revision. It was also included in Robert Dimery's book 1001 Albums You Must Hear Before You Die. In 2000, the album was voted number 267 in Colin Larkin's All Time Top 1000 Albums book.

== Track listing ==
Side one
No.	Title	Writer(s)	Length
1.	"Mr. Tambourine Man"	Bob Dylan	2:29
2.	"I'll Feel a Whole Lot Better"	Gene Clark	2:32
3.	"Spanish Harlem Incident"	Dylan	1:57
4.	"You Won't Have to Cry"	Clark, Jim McGuinn	2:08
5.	"Here Without You"	Clark	2:36
6.	"The Bells of Rhymney"	Idris Davies, Pete Seeger	3:30

Side two
No.	Title	Writer(s)	Length
1.	"All I Really Want to Do"	Dylan	2:04
2.	"I Knew I'd Want You"	Clark	2:14
3.	"It's No Use"	Clark, McGuinn	2:23
4.	"Don't Doubt Yourself, Babe"	Jackie DeShannon	2:54
5.	"Chimes of Freedom"	Dylan	3:51
6.	"We'll Meet Again"	Ross Parker, Hughie Charles	2:07
Total length:			31:35

- Sides one and two were combined as tracks 1–12 on CD reissues.

1996 CD reissue bonus tracks
No.	Title	Writer(s)	Length
13.	"She Has a Way"	Clark	2:25
14.	"I'll Feel a Whole Lot Better" (alternate version)	Clark	2:28
15.	"It's No Use" (alternate version)	Clark, McGuinn	2:24
16.	"You Won't Have to Cry" (alternate version)	Clark, McGuinn	2:07
17.	"All I Really Want to Do" (single version)	Dylan	2:02
18.	"You and Me" (instrumental)	Clark, McGuinn, David Crosby	2:11

== Personnel ==
Adapted from the CD liner notes and So You Want To Be A Rock 'n' Roll Star: The Byrds Day-By-Day (1965-1973).

The Byrds

- Jim McGuinn – vocals, lead guitar
- Gene Clark – vocals, rhythm guitar, tambourine (vocals only on "Mr. Tambourine Man" and "I Knew I'd Want You")
- David Crosby – vocals; rhythm guitar (vocals only on "Mr. Tambourine Man" and "I Knew I'd Want You")
- Chris Hillman – electric bass (except "Mr. Tambourine Man" and "I Knew I'd Want You")
- Michael Clarke – drums (except "Mr. Tambourine Man" and "I Knew I'd Want You")

Additional Personnel

- Jerry Cole – rhythm guitar (on "Mr. Tambourine Man" and "I Knew I'd Want You")
- Bill Pitman - rhythm guitar (on "Mr. Tambourine Man" and "I Knew I'd Want You")
- Larry Knechtel – electric bass (on "Mr. Tambourine Man" and "I Knew I'd Want You")
- Leon Russell – electric piano (on "Mr. Tambourine Man" and "I Knew I'd Want You")
- Hal Blaine – drums (on "Mr. Tambourine Man" and "I Knew I'd Want You")

Production

- Terry Melcher – producer
- Billy James – liner notes
- Barry Feinstein – cover photo
- Vic Anesini – mixing, mastering (1996 reissue)
- David Fricke – reissue liner notes (1996 reissue)

== Release history ==
Date	Label	Format	Country	Catalog	Notes
June 21, 1965	Columbia	LP	US	CL 2372	Original mono release.
June 21, 1965	Columbia	LP	US	CS 9172	Original stereo release.
August 20, 1965	CBS	LP	UK	BPG 62571	Original mono release.
August 20, 1965	CBS	LP	UK	SBPG 62571	Original stereo release.
1970	Columbia	LP	US	465566 1	
1974	Embassy	LP	UK	EMB 31057	
1974	CBS/Embassy	LP	UK	S 31503	
1975	CBS	LP	UK	S 33645	Double album stereo reissue with Turn! Turn! Turn!
1987	Columbia	CD	US	CK 9172	Original CD release.
1989	CBS	CD	Europe	465566 2	
1993	Columbia	CD	UK	COL 468015	
April 30, 1996	Columbia/Legacy	CD	US	CK 64845	Partially remixed stereo album plus six bonus tracks.
May 6, 1996	Columbia/Legacy	CD	UK	COL 483705	Partially remixed stereo album plus six bonus tracks.
1999	Simply Vinyl	LP	UK	SVLP 0032	Reissue of the partially remixed stereo album.
2003	Sony	CD	Japan	MHCP-66	Reissue containing six bonus tracks and the partially remixed stereo album in a replica LP sleeve.
2004	Sony/BMG	CD	UK	4837055003	The Vinyl Classics reissue containing six bonus tracks and the partially remixed stereo album.
February 7, 2006	Columbia/Mobile Fidelity Sound Lab	SACD (Hybrid)	US	UDSACD 2014	Reissue of the Mono album plus stereo bonus tracks.
February 21, 2006	Sundazed	LP	US	LP 5197	Reissue of the original mono release.
February 10, 2009	Sony/Columbia	CD	US	743323	2 CD reissue with Sweetheart of the Rodeo, containing six bonus tracks and the partially remixed stereo album.
