= All I Really Want to Do (album) =

Studio album by Cher
- Released: August 16, 1965
- Studios: Gold Star, Los Angeles
- Genre: Folk-pop
- Length: 31:45
- Label: Imperial
- Producer: Sonny Bono

Cher chronology
All I Really Want to Do (1965)	The Sonny Side of Chér (1966)

Singles from All I Really Want to Do
- 1. "All I Really Want to Do" Released: June 7, 1965

All I Really Want to Do is the debut solo studio album by American singer and actress Cher, released on August 16, 1965, by Imperial Records. Issued while she was still recording as part of the duo Sonny & Cher, the album marked her first full-length project under her own name and represented a parallel launch to her work with Sonny Bono on Atco Records.

Produced by Bono with arrangements by Harold Battiste, and recorded at Gold Star Studios in Hollywood, the album is largely composed of cover versions, drawing from contemporary folk and rock material. Its repertoire includes songs by Bob Dylan, Ray Davies, and other established writers, alongside a small number of compositions associated with Bono.

Upon release, All I Really Want to Do was met with generally positive critical reception and achieved notable commercial success. Retrospective reviews have highlighted its production and Cher's vocal presence, while commercially it reached the top 20 in the United States and the top 10 in the United Kingdom.

== Background and production ==
At the same time that the duo Sonny & Cher were debuting on Atco Records, Sonny Bono arranged a solo deal for Cher on the Imperial label. After the success of Sonny & Cher's "I Got You Babe" single, Bono decided to promote his wife as a solo act, producing her first full-length album himself. The album was Cher's first solo project since the release of her two unsuccessful 1964 singles, "Ringo, I Love You" and "Dream Baby", released under the pseudonyms Bonnie Jo Mason and Cherilyn respectively. All I Really Want to Do, like the debut album by Sonny & Cher, Look at Us, contains many covers. The album includes recordings of contemporary, uptempo rock songs, but it also has a somewhat folky slant to it, in order to differentiate it from the musical style of Sonny & Cher's records. Recording for the album concluded at Gold Star Studios in Hollywood the last week of June 1965.

On the album, Cher covered three songs written and performed by Bob Dylan, "All I Really Want to Do", "Blowin' in the Wind", and "Don't Think Twice, It's All Right". The album contains "Needles and Pins", which Bono co-wrote and was a hit for the British band, The Searchers, in 1964. The album also included Ray Davies' "I Go to Sleep", which was later a hit in the UK for The Pretenders, and Cher's version of the traditional song, "See See Rider", arranged by Sonny Bono, Charles Greene, and Robert Stone. Other covers on the album are "She Thinks I Still Care", "The Bells of Rhymney", and "Come and Stay With Me". During the album recording sessions, Cher recorded a song written by Bono, titled "I'm Gonna Love You", which did not appear on the album but was issued as the B-side of the "All I Really Want to Do" single. The song was later included on the 1967 Sonny & Cher soundtrack album, Good Times.

== Singles ==
The song "All I Really Want to Do" was the only single to be taken from the album and reached #15 on the Billboard Hot 100 and #9 on the UK singles chart. The song also entered the Canadian, Dutch, and Swedish single charts. "All I Really Want to Do" was the first single to be released by Cher under that name and was also her first solo hit. The album also contained the Bono-penned song, "Dream Baby", which had been released as a single in 1964 by Cher, under the pseudonym of Cherilyn.

The initial idea to cover "All I Really Want to Do" came when Cher heard the Los Angeles folk-rock band the Byrds perform it during their pre-fame residency at Ciro's nightclub on the Sunset Strip in March 1965. A minor controversy between Cher and the Byrds ensued when it was alleged by Columbia Records (the Byrds' record label) that Cher and Sonny Bono had taped one of the Byrds' appearances at Ciro's without permission, in order to use some of the band's repertoire ("All I Really Want to Do" and "The Bells of Rhymney") on Cher's own album. Although the Byrds planned to issue "All I Really Want to Do" as a single themselves, they were largely unconcerned with the imminent release of Cher's recording, feeling that there was enough room in the charts for both versions. In a retaliatory attempt to bury Cher's version, Columbia rush-released the Byrds' "All I Really Want to Do" single and both versions entered the Billboard Hot 100 during the same week. A chart battle ensued, largely instigated by Columbia Records and the music press, but ultimately the Byrds' version stalled at #40 on the U.S. charts, while Cher's cover reached #15. In the UK, however, both versions reached the top 10, the Byrds' version reaching #4 and Cher's recording peaking at #9.

== CD releases ==
In 1992, All I Really Want to Do and Cher's follow-up solo album, The Sonny Side of Chér, were reissued on one CD by EMI Records. Later, in 1995, EMI released a collection titled The Originals, which included All I Really Want to Do, The Sonny Side of Chér, and Cher's third solo album, Chér. The album was again reissued on one CD with The Sonny Side of Chér by BGO Records in 2005 in the UK only. The original twelve track All I Really Want to Do album has never been issued on Compact Disc on its own.

== Critical reception ==
Professional ratings
Review scores
Source	Rating
AllMusic	4/5 stars
Record Mirror	2/5 stars

Billboard noted that the album has "all the ingredients for a smash LP", adding that its well-performed tracks "add to the sales appeal of this hot chart package". Record Mirror wrote that Cher's image is "fantastic" and her voice "isn't as good" without Sonny, adding that "this LP will obviously sell well, but on the strength of her image rather than the quality". Record World included the album among its "Albums of the Week", describing Cher as "no gal is hotter these days".

In a retrospective review, Tim Sendra of the AllMusic noted that the album features Sonny Bono "using his Spector-derived production skills to create rich, chiming backgrounds for Cher to sing over", and described the record as "one of the stronger folk-pop records of the era". Sendra went on to note that "Cher isn't the most subtle singer, but she sounds young and full of life on these tracks, like she really believes in what she is singing (a feeling you don't always get on her more lightweight material)."

== Chart performance ==
All I Really Want to Do peaked at number 16 on the Billboard 200 chart in the United States and went on to spend 24 weeks on the chart. The album entered the chart while the debut album by Sonny & Cher, Look at Us, was still at number two. The album also entered the UK Albums Chart, debuting at number 20 in early October 1965 and peaking at #7 two weeks later. The album remained in the UK chart for nine weeks between early October and late November. Although All I Really Want to Do reached the UK Album Chart, it failed to chart in Europe.

== Track listing ==
Side one
No.	Title	Writer(s)	Length
1.	"All I Really Want to Do"	Bob Dylan	2:56
2.	"I Go to Sleep"	Ray Davies	2:28
3.	"Needles and Pins"	Sonny Bono; Jack Nitzsche	2:26
4.	"Don't Think Twice"	Dylan	2:25
5.	"He Thinks I Still Care"	Dickey Lee Lipscomb	2:15
6.	"Dream Baby"	Bono	2:58

Side two
No.	Title	Writer(s)	Length
1.	"The Bells of Rhymney"	Idris Davies; Pete Seeger	3:07
2.	"Girl Don't Come"	Chris Andrews	2:05
3.	"See See Rider"	Traditional (arranged by Bono, Charles Greene, Robert Stone)	2:38
4.	"Come and Stay with Me"	Jackie DeShannon	2:45
5.	"Cry Myself to Sleep"	Mike Gordon	2:18
6.	"Blowin' in the Wind"	Dylan	3:24

== Personnel ==
- Cher – lead vocals
- Sonny Bono – record producer
- Bill Marx – accordion, keyboards
- René Hall, Cliff Hills, Mel Pollan, Lyle Ritz – bass guitar
- Frank Capp, Sharkey Hall, Jessie Sailes – drums
- Monte Dunn, Jeff Kaplan, Barney Kessel, Steve Mann, Donald Peake, Mike Post, Randy Sterling – guitar

- Michel Rubini – keyboards
- Frank DeVito, Gene Estes, Brian Stone, Julius Wechter – percussion
- Harold Battiste – piano
- Recorded at Gold Star Recording Studios, Hollywood, CA

== Charts ==
Weekly chart performance for All I Really Want to Do
Chart (1965)	Peak position
UK Albums (Official Charts)	7
US Billboard 200	16
US Cash Box Top 100 Albums	13
US Record World Top 100 LP's	7
