= I'll Feel a Whole Lot Better =

- 1965 Dutch picture sleeve

Single by the Byrds

from the album Mr. Tambourine Man
- A-side: "All I Really Want to Do"
- Released: June 14, 1965
- Recorded: April 14, 1965
- Studio: Columbia, Hollywood, California
- Genre: Rock; power pop
- Length: 2:32
- Label: Columbia
- Songwriter: Gene Clark
- Producer: Terry Melcher

The Byrds singles chronology
"Mr. Tambourine Man" (1965)	"All I Really Want to Do" / "I'll Feel a Whole Lot Better" (1965)	"Turn! Turn! Turn!" (1965)

Music video
- "I'll Feel a Whole Lot Better" (audio) on YouTube

"I'll Feel a Whole Lot Better" is a song by the Los Angeles folk rock band the Byrds, first released in June 1965 on the B-side of the band's second single, "All I Really Want to Do". Despite initially being released as a B-side, the song managed to chart in its own right in the U.S., just outside the Billboard Hot 100. It was also included on the Byrds' debut album, Mr. Tambourine Man and The Byrds' Greatest Hits.

The song was written by band member Gene Clark, who also sings the lead vocal. "I'll Feel a Whole Lot Better" has been covered by a number of different artists over the years, and is regarded by fans and critics as one of the Byrds' best known songs.

== Composition and content ==
The song dates from the Byrds' pre-fame residency at Ciro's nightclub in Los Angeles, as Clark explained during an interview: "There was a girlfriend I had known at the time, when we were playing at Ciro's. It was a weird time in my life because everything was changing so fast and I knew we were becoming popular. This girl was a funny girl, she was kind of a strange little girl and she started bothering me a lot. And I just wrote the song, 'I'm gonna feel a whole lot better when you're gone,' and that's all it was, but I wrote the whole song within a few minutes."

Byrds expert Tim Conners has called the song "the Platonic ideal of a Byrds song", in reference to the presence of some of the band's early musical trademarks, including Jim McGuinn's jangling 12-string Rickenbacker guitar; Chris Hillman's complex bass work; David Crosby's propulsive rhythm guitar, and the band's complex harmony singing and use of wordless "aaahhhh"s. Band biographer Johnny Rogan has also commented on the song's country-influenced guitar solo.

The song is built around a riff that Clark later admitted was based on the Searchers' cover of "Needles and Pins". Music critic Mark Deming has said that, lyrically, "I'll Feel a Whole Lot Better" takes a sardonic view of romance, with Clark undecided about whether to break off a relationship with a woman who hasn't been entirely honest with him. The song's refrain of "I'll probably feel a whole lot better when you're gone" betrays Clark's uncertainty about ending the relationship and whether such an act would be the answer to his problems or not.

Deming has also pointed out that the use of the word "probably" in this refrain is key and lends the track a depth of subtext that was unusual for a pop song in the mid-1960s. Jim Dickson, the Byrds' manager, has remarked that this level of subtext was not unusual in Clark's songs of the period. Said Dickson, "There was always something to unravel in those songs, the non-explanation of the complex feeling. For instance, if you remember I'll Feel a Whole Lot Better, it doesn't say: "I'll feel a whole lot better", but "I'll probably feel a whole lot better." For me, that makes the song. There's a statement followed by a hesitation." Dickson would later work as a producer on Clark's 1984 album Firebyrd, which featured a re-recorded version of "I'll Feel a Whole Lot Better".

== Reception ==
Although it was initially released as the B-side of the "All I Really Want to Do" single, "I'll Feel a Whole Lot Better" was itself heavily promoted by Columbia Records during the time that "All I Really Want to Do" spent on the Billboard charts. As a result, the song managed to chart in its own right in the U.S., reaching number 103 on Billboard's Bubbling Under the Hot 100 chart. Mark Deming has commented that "I'll Feel a Whole Lot Better" was the first song written by a member of the Byrds to be commercially successful. Cash Box described it as "a hard-driving, fast-moving happy-go-lucky infectious blueser."

Since its release, the song has become a rock music standard, inspiring a number of cover versions over the years. It is also considered by many critics to be one of the band's, as well as Clark's, best and most popular songs, with Rolling Stone magazine ranking it at number 234 on their list of The 500 Greatest Songs of All Time.

== Personnel ==
The Byrds

- Gene Clark – lead vocals, tambourine
- Jim McGuinn – 12-string Rickenbacker guitar, backing vocals
- David Crosby – rhythm guitar, backing vocals
- Chris Hillman – bass guitar
- Michael Clarke – drums

== Renditions by other artists ==
- In 1973, Johnny Rivers covered the song for his Blue Suede Shoes album; the song was also included on his 2006 compilation album, Secret Agent Man: The Ultimate Johnny Rivers Anthology.
- In 1978, country singer Bobby Bare covered the song for his album Sleeper Wherever I Fall. San Francisco band the Flamin' Groovies also released a cover of the song on their 1978 Sire Records release, Flamin' Groovies Now.
- Country pop artist Juice Newton covered the song on her 1985 album Old Flame as "Feel a Whole Lot Better". Newton's version also alters some of the song's verse lyrics.
- Tom Petty recorded the song (as "Feel a Whole Lot Better") for his 1989 solo album, Full Moon Fever. Petty's version peaked at number 18 on the US Rock chart.
- Dinosaur Jr. recorded a grunge-style version for the 1989 Byrds tribute album, Time Between – A Tribute to the Byrds. J Mascis commented, "When I was younger, I thought the Byrds were too wimpy for me, but I got into them in my late twenties. Maybe I got into them through the back door via Gram Parsons, who I was really into, first of all. Dinosaur Jr even did a cover of 'I'll Feel A Whole Lot Better' on an early Byrds tribute record, though I still wasn't that into them then."
- Argentinian rock musician Charly García covered the song on his 1990 album, Filosofía Barata y Zapatos de Goma. The track was titled "Me Siento Mucho Mejor" with the lyrics translated into Spanish.
- In 2005, Paulina Rubio started to work on her pop-rock-oriented eight studio album Ananda. After meeting with different American producers, the singer became familiar with the original version of "I'll Feel a Whole Lot Better" by the Byrds and decided to record a cover of the song in Spanish with the lyrics by Argentinian musician Charly Garcia. The track was not included on the physical edition of the album when Ananda was released in September 2006. However, it was released on the deluxe edition album as a bonus track on March 20, 2007, as well as a digital single the same day.
