= The Bells of Rhymney =

Song by Pete Seeger to lyrics by Welsh poet Idris Davies

Song by Pete Seeger

from the album Pete Seeger and Sonny Terry
- Released: July 1958
- Recorded: December 27, 1957
- Genre: Folk
- Label: Folkways
- Songwriters: Pete Seeger, Idris Davies

"The Bells of Rhymney" is a song by the American folk singer Pete Seeger, which consists of Seeger's own music accompanying words written by the Welsh poet Idris Davies. Seeger first released a recording of the song on a live album in 1958, but it is the American folk rock band the Byrds' 1965 recording that is the best known version of the song.

== Composition ==
The lyrics to the song were drawn from part of Davies' poetic work Gwalia Deserta, which was first published in 1938. The work was inspired by a local coal mining disaster and the failure of the 1926 General Strike, with the "Bells of Rhymney" stanzas following the pattern of the nursery rhyme "Oranges and Lemons". The poem refers to the bells of the following Welsh places: Rhymney, Merthyr, Rhondda, Blaina, Caerphilly, Neath, Brecon, Swansea, Newport, Cardiff and Wye.

Two decades after Gwalia Deserta was published, Seeger used one part of the work as lyrics for his song after discovering them in a book by the Welsh poet Dylan Thomas. The song was first released as part of a suite of songs, including "Sinking of the Reuben James" and "There Was an Old Lady Who Swallowed a Fly", on Seeger and Sonny Terry's 1958 live album, Pete Seeger and Sonny Terry. Another live version of the song was included on Seeger's 1967 compilation album, Pete Seeger's Greatest Hits.

== The Byrds' rendition ==
"The Bells of Rhymney"

Song by the Byrds

from the album Mr. Tambourine Man
- Released: June 21, 1965
- Recorded: April 14, 1965
- Studio: Columbia, Hollywood, California
- Genre: Folk rock
- Length: 3:30
- Label: Columbia
- Songwriters: Pete Seeger, Idris Davies
- Producer: Terry Melcher

Arguably the most famous rendition of the song is the version recorded by the American folk rock band the Byrds. The Byrds' recording of "The Bells of Rhymney" was committed to tape on April 14, 1965, and released as part of the band's debut album, Mr. Tambourine Man.

At the time of recording, the song was a relative newcomer to the Byrds' repertoire, having first been performed during the band's March 1965, pre-fame residency at Ciro's nightclub on the Sunset Strip in Los Angeles. Lead guitarist Roger McGuinn (at that time known as Jim McGuinn) had brought the song to the band after becoming familiar with it as an arranger on Judy Collins' third album, Judy Collins 3, which itself included a cover version of "The Bells of Rhymney". Although the Byrds were anxious to correctly pronounce the Welsh place-names in the song's lyrics on their recording, they, like Seeger, actually mispronounced the name Rhymney as "Rimney" (it should be pronounced as "Rumney").

Author Chris Smith has made mention of the presence of a number of the Byrds' early musical trademarks in their recording of "The Bells of Rhymney", including their complex harmony singing and McGuinn's jangly twelve-string Rickenbacker guitar playing. In his book Icons of Rock: An Encyclopedia of the Legends Who Changed Music Forever, author Scott Schinder has noted that the band's rendition of the song "managed to craft the dour subject matter into a radio-friendly pop song without sacrificing the song's haunting message."

The Byrds' recording of "The Bells of Rhymney" was also influential on the Beatles, particularly George Harrison, who constructed his song "If I Needed Someone" around the same guitar riff that the Byrds had used in the song.

== Other recordings ==
"The Bells of Rhymney" was also covered by Cher, soon after the release of the Byrds' version, on her All I Really Want to Do album. Bob Dylan and the Band recorded the song in 1967, although it wasn't released until 2014 on The Bootleg Series Vol. 11: The Basement Tapes Complete.

Other artists who have recorded the song include: Judy Collins, the Serendipity Singers, the Alarm, the Ian Campbell Folk Group, Murray Head, John Denver, Weddings Parties Anything, Tommy Makem, Jim Hendricks, Fifth Avenue, Robyn Hitchcock, Beck and Jakob Dylan, Oysterband, Ralph McTell and Chris Hillman.
