= I Knew I'd Want You =

Single by the Byrds

from the album Mr. Tambourine Man
- A-side: "Mr. Tambourine Man"
- Released: April 12, 1965
- Recorded: January 20, 1965
- Studio: Columbia, Hollywood, California
- Genre: Folk rock
- Length: 2:14
- Label: Columbia
- Songwriter(s): Gene Clark
- Producer(s): Terry Melcher

The Byrds singles chronology
| "Mr. Tambourine Man" / "I Knew I'd Want You" (1965) | "All I Really Want to Do" (1965) |

"I Knew I'd Want You" is a song by the folk rock band the Byrds, written by band member Gene Clark, and first released as the B-side to their 1965 debut single, "Mr. Tambourine Man". It was also later included on their debut album, Mr. Tambourine Man.

== Lyrics and music ==
"I Knew I'd Want You" is one of the earliest original songs written by one of the Byrds, dating back to 1964 when the band was known as the Jet Set. The song, which features a lead vocal by Clark, has been described by Allmusic critic Matthew Greenwald as a folk rock song taken at mid-tempo, while author Christopher Hjort called it, "a minor-tinged 6/8 shuffle."

Author James Perone finds the overall sound of the song similar to that of the Beatles' "You've Got to Hide Your Love Away", particularly through its use of a triple meter and acoustic instruments, noting that the Byrds song was released first and probably even recorded first. Perone also feels that certain features, such as its minor key and the general melodic shape, anticipated the Moody Blues' "Nights in White Satin." Band biographer Johnny Rogan notes a nod to the Beatles in the use of the phrase "oh yeah" at the end of the refrain. Rogan also described the lyrics as being "romantic" and incorporating "hip parlance", such as the line, "You'd have me on your trip..."

== Recording and release ==
"I Knew I'd Want You" was recorded on January 20, 1965, at the same session that produced "Mr. Tambourine Man." As with that song, 12-string guitarist Roger McGuinn was the only member of the Byrds to play his instrument on the song. The other musicians credited are members of the Wrecking Crew, including Larry Knechtel (bass guitar), Leon Russell (electric piano), Hal Blaine (drums), and Jerry Cole (guitar).

However, author James Perone believes that the bass guitar and rhythm guitar on "I Knew I'd Want You" sound like Byrd members Chris Hillman and David Crosby, respectively. Hillman has stated in interview that neither he nor Crosby played on the song, noting that the contrast between the slicker, more polished sound of the session musicians on "I Knew I'd Want You" and "Mr. Tambourine Man" is quite noticeable compared to the rawer sound of the Byrds' own playing on the rest of the Mr. Tambourine Man album.

According to Byrds' manager Jim Dickson, the executives at Columbia Records felt it was too risky to release a poetic song like "Mr. Tambourine Man" as the A-side of the Byrds' first single and wanted "I Knew I'd Want You" to be the A-side instead, but at the insistence of producer Terry Melcher, "Mr. Tambourine Man" was ultimately released as the A-side. The "Mr. Tambourine Man" single reached number 1 on the Billboard Hot 100.

Matthew Greenwald calls "I Knew I'd Want You" a "highlight" of Mr. Tambourine Man and compares the song's ability "to convey feelings of both love and alienation" to songs of Burt Bacharach and Hal David. Cash Box described it as "a impressive, slick English sound-ish romancer with a contagious melodic undercurrent." In the 4th edition of The Rolling Stone Album Guide Rob Sheffield calls it one of "the most vital songs" on Mr. Tambourine Man. Rogan considers the song to be impressive enough "to stand along some of the best Lennon/McCartney material of the period. Rogan finds Clark's vocal to be "moving" although "a little mannered." Allmusic critic Richie Unterberger considers it to be "lyrically less challenging, but equally powerful musically" compared to the Bob Dylan, Pete Seeger, and Jackie DeShannon penned songs on Mr. Tambourine Man.

== Other appearances ==
"I Knew I'd Want You" was included on several Byrds' compilation albums. A new stereo remix was included on the 1987 archival album Never Before. The song was also included in the 2006 box set There Is a Season. An early, alternate version was included on the 1969 album Preflyte and the 1988 album In the Beginning.

A version of "I Knew I'd Want You" recorded by songwriter Gene Clark was included on Echoes, the 1991 repackaging of his 1967 solo debut album Gene Clark with the Gosdin Brothers. Thin White Rope covered the song for the CD version of the 1989 tribute album Time Between – A Tribute to The Byrds. Allmusic critic Jason Ankeny describes the Thin White Rope version as a "high-wattage, heavy metal rendition." Thin White Rope also released the song on their 1991 EP Squatter's Rights.
