= Time Between – A Tribute to The Byrds =

Time Between - A Tribute to the Byrds

Compilation album by Various Artists
- Released: 1989
- Genre: Rock, alternative rock, indie rock, folk rock,
- Label: Imaginary, Communion Label

Time Between – A Tribute to The Byrds is a various artists tribute album consisting of cover versions of songs originally written and recorded by the Los Angeles band The Byrds. It was released in 1989 as an LP and CD by Imaginary Records in the UK and by the Communion Label in the United States. The vinyl LP features a fourteen-song track listing, while the CD edition of the album includes five bonus tracks, bringing the total number of songs to nineteen. Although the compilation did not chart in the U.S. or the UK, Bruce Eder, writing for the Allmusic website, has noted "A superior lineup of contributors helps make Time Between: A Tribute to the Byrds one of the better homages of its kind."

== Track listing ==
=== Side 1 ===
1. "Eight Miles High" – The Moffs
2. "Time Between"/"Why" – The Mock Turtles
3. "She Don't Care About Time" – The Cateran
4. "Change Is Now" – Giant Sand
5. "It Happens Each Day" – Static (a pseudonym for Summerhill who are thanked on the back label)
6. "Thoughts and Words" – The Primevals
7. "Here Without You" – Richard Thompson, Clive Gregson, Christine Collister

=== Side 2 ===
1. "I'll Feel a Whole Lot Better" – Dinosaur Jr.
2. "Everybody's Been Burned" – Thin White Rope
3. "Mr. Spaceman" – Miracle Legion
4. "Draft Morning" – The Chills
5. "King Apathy III" – The Barracudas
6. "Triad"/"Chestnut Mare" – The Icicle Works
7. "Wild Mountain Thyme" – Nigel & the Crosses (a one-off pseudonym for Robyn Hitchcock)

=== CD bonus tracks ===
15. "Lady Friend" – Static
16. "I Knew I'd Want You" – Thin White Rope
17. "All the Things" – Miracle Legion
18. "Tribal Gathering" – The Primevals
19. "Hickory Wind" – Richard Thompson, Clive Gregson, Christine Collister
