= All I Really Want to Do =

1964 song by Bob Dylan

- Cover of the M. Witmark & Sons sheet music

Song by Bob Dylan

from the album Another Side of Bob Dylan
- Released: August 8, 1964
- Recorded: June 9, 1964
- Genre: Folk
- Length: 4:04
- Label: Columbia
- Songwriter: Bob Dylan
- Producer: Tom Wilson

"All I Really Want to Do" is a song written by Bob Dylan and featured on his Tom Wilson-produced 1964 album, Another Side of Bob Dylan. It is arguably one of the most popular songs that Dylan wrote in the period immediately after he abandoned topical songwriting. Within a year of its release on Another Side of Bob Dylan, it had also become one of Dylan's most familiar songs to pop and rock audiences, due to hit cover versions by Cher and the Byrds.

== Song information ==
"All I Really Want to Do" was first released on Dylan's 1964 album Another Side of Bob Dylan. The song was also included on the Dylan compilations Bob Dylan's Greatest Hits Vol. II in 1971 and the 3-disc edition of Dylan in 2007. In addition, two live versions of the song have been released: one, recorded in 1978, on Bob Dylan at Budokan and the other, recorded in 1964, on The Bootleg Series Vol. 6: Bob Dylan Live 1964, Concert at Philharmonic Hall.

Dylan wrote the song in 1964 and recorded it in one take on June 9, 1964. Like other songs on Another Side of Bob Dylan, "All I Really Want to Do" was inspired by Dylan's breakup with Suze Rotolo. "All I Really Want to Do" opens the album with a different attitude than Dylan's previous album, The Times They Are a-Changin'; a playful song about a relationship rather than a finger-pointing political song. Musically simple, though playful, "All I Really Want to Do" is essentially a list of things, physical and psychological, that Dylan does not want to do or be to the listener (perhaps a woman, but just as likely his audience as a whole). Dylan laughs at some of his own jokes in the song, as he parodies typical "boy meets girl" love songs. One interpretation of the song is that it is a parody of male responses to early feminist conversations. Along with another Another Side of Bob Dylan song, "It Ain't Me, Babe", "All I Really Want to Do" questioned the usual assumptions of relationships between men and women, rejecting possessiveness and machismo. The song's chorus features Dylan singing in a high, keening yodel, likely inspired by Hank Williams or Ramblin' Jack Elliott, while disingenuously claiming that all he wants to do is to be friends. "All I Really Want to Do" sees Dylan experimenting with the conventions of the romantic pop song by constructing rhymes within lines and also rhyming the end of every line with the end of the following line.

The first known live concert performance of "All I Really Want to Do" was at the Newport Folk Festival on July 26, 1964. It remained part of Dylan's concert set list for his all acoustic shows in 1965. It returned to Dylan's concert sets in 1978, when Dylan sang it at the end of most shows to the melody of Simon and Garfunkel's "The 59th Street Bridge Song (Feelin' Groovy)". For those shows, he often revised the lyrics, incorporating mischievous verses such as:

I ain't lookin' to make you fry
See you fly or watch you die
And I don't want to drag you down
Chain you down or be your clown

== Cher version ==
"All I Really Want to Do"
- West German picture sleeve

Single by Cher

from the album All I Really Want to Do
- B-side: "I'm Gonna Love You"
- Released: June 1965
- Genre: Folk rock
- Length: 2:59
- Label: Imperial
- Songwriter: Bob Dylan
- Producer: Sonny Bono

Cher singles chronology
"Ringo, I Love You" (1964)	"All I Really Want to Do" (1965)	"Where Do You Go?" (1965)

Audio sample
- "All I Really Want to Do" (Cher version): file; help

Audio
- "All I Really Want to Do - Cher" on YouTube

"All I Really Want to Do" is the debut single by American singer and actress Cher. Released in June 1965, it reached number 15 on the Billboard Hot 100 chart and number 9 on Record Retailer magazine's singles chart. Cher's recording of the song also charted in several other countries during 1965. Cher's version was involved in a chart battle with the Byrds' recording of "All I Really Want to Do" when both versions entered the Billboard Hot 100 the week ending June 26.

=== Background and release ===
The initial idea to cover the song came when Cher heard the Byrds perform it during their pre-fame residency at Ciro's nightclub on the Sunset Strip in March 1965. This caused a minor controversy when it was alleged by the Byrds and their management that Cher and her husband, Sonny Bono, had taped one of the Byrds' appearances at Ciro's without permission, in order to utilize some of the band's material for their own releases. However, Cher's version is, in fact, quite different from the Byrds' recording and lacks the Beatlesque bridge that remained unique to their version. Cher sang her cover on the music television program American Bandstand on June 12, 1965. Her cover was the more successful in the U.S., reaching the Billboard top 20, while the Byrds' single faltered at number 40. The reverse was true in the UK, where the Byrds' single reached number 4.

=== Charts ===
1965 weekly chart performance for "All I Really Want to Do" by Cher
Chart (1965)	Peak position
Canada (Canadian Hot 100)	11 (Note: RPM magazine listed the Byrds' version of "All I Really Want to Do" at number 11 on August 9, 1965. In the following week's issue, the Byrds and Cher's versions were listed jointly at number 11.)
Israel (IBA)	9
Netherlands (Dutch Top 40)	15
Norway Singles Top 20	8
Quebec (ADISQ)	9
Sweden (Sverigetopplistan)	13
UK Singles (OCC)	9
US Billboard Hot 100	15
US Cash Box Top 100	9
Zimbabwe Singles Chart	4

=== Year-end charts ===
Year-end chart performance for "All I Really Want to Do" by Cher
Chart (1965)	Position
Dutch Top 100	95
U.S. Billboard Hot 100	90

== The Byrds' version ==
"All I Really Want to Do"
- Norwegian picture sleeve

Single by the Byrds

from the album Mr. Tambourine Man
- B-side: "I'll Feel a Whole Lot Better"
- Released: June 14, 1965
- Recorded: March 8 and April 14, 1965
- Studio: Columbia, Hollywood, California
- Genre: Folk rock
- Length: 2:02
- Label: Columbia
- Songwriter: Bob Dylan
- Producer: Terry Melcher

The Byrds singles chronology
"Mr. Tambourine Man" (1965)	"All I Really Want to Do" (1965)	"Turn! Turn! Turn!" (1965)

"All I Really Want to Do" is the second single by the American folk rock band the Byrds, and was released on June 14, 1965, by Columbia Records. The song was also included on the band's debut album, Mr. Tambourine Man, which was released on June 21, 1965. The version of the song released as a single incorporates a different vocal take, compared to the version found on the Mr. Tambourine Man album, as revealed by the slight lyrical variations in the song's first verse and the different running times the two versions have; the single is 2:02 minutes in length, while the album version is slightly longer at 2:04. The single reached #40 on the Billboard Hot 100 and #4 on the Record Retailer chart.

The single was rush-released by the band's record label, Columbia Records, when it transpired that Cher was about to issue a rival cover version of the song on the Imperial label (see above). However, the Byrds and their management were largely unconcerned about Cher's imminent release, feeling that there was sufficient room in the charts for both versions. In fact, the Byrds were reluctant to release another Dylan-penned single at all, feeling that it was somewhat formulaic. However, Columbia was insistent, believing that in the wake of the Byrds' debut single, "Mr. Tambourine Man", another Dylan cover equaled an instant hit. A chart battle ensued, largely instigated by the music press and Columbia (who were determined to bury Cher's release), but ultimately the single stalled at #40 on the U.S. charts, while Cher's cover reached #15. The reverse was true in the UK, however, where the Byrds' version became the fastest selling single in CBS Records' history, finally reaching #4 while Cher's recording peaked at #9.

What really got me most was Dylan coming up to me and saying, "They beat you man," and he lost faith in me. He was shattered. His material had been bastardized. There we were, the defenders and protectors of his music, and we'd let Sonny & Cher get away with it.

— Roger McGuinn

The Byrds' version of the song is noticeably different in structure to Dylan's. It begins with Jim McGuinn's jangling guitar introduction (played on a 12-string Rickenbacker guitar) and features a substantially changed, ascending melody progression in the chorus, made "more attractive" by the band's "angelic" harmonies. In addition, the band completely changed the melody to one of the song's verses, in order to turn it into a Beatlesque, minor-key bridge. Although McGuinn sang lead on most of the song, rhythm guitarist David Crosby sang lead on the middle eight.

Reaction to the single in the press was generally positive, with Billboard magazine commenting "another hot pop, folk-flavoured Bob Dylan tune is offered by the dynamic group." Cash Box said that "the rousing, rhythmic Bob Dylan-penned romancer is given a funky soulful sendoff" and that it should become a hit similar to "Mr. Tambourine Man". Record World felt it was a "fitting and proper sequel to 'Mr. Tambourine Man'." In the UK, Penny Valentine, writing in Disc, opined "I think this is a marvelous song, but, Byrds fan though I have always been, I prefer the Sonny & Cher [sic] recording." In the NME, Derek Johnson also praised the single, predicting it would be a UK number one, and commenting "The pattern is much the same as before, with those familiar high-register harmonies – clearly influenced by the West Coast surf sound...coupled with strident twangs throughout, rattling tambourines, and crashing cymbals."

In addition to appearing on the Byrds' debut album, the song is included on several Byrds compilation albums, including The Byrds' Greatest Hits; The Original Singles: 1965–1967, Volume 1; The Byrds; The Essential Byrds; The Byrds Play Dylan; and There Is a Season.

=== Charts ===
Chart (1965)	Peak position
Canada Top Singles (RPM)	11
New Zealand (Laver Hit Parade)	8
U.K. (Record Retailer)	4
U.S. Billboard Hot 100	40

== Personnel ==
- Bob Dylan - vocals, acoustic guitar, harmonica
