= Billy James (publicist) =

American publicist and talent scout

Billy James is an American publicist and talent scout, best known for his work in the 1960s and 1970s discovering and developing musical talent for record companies such as Columbia, Elektra, and RCA Records.

As a young publicist for Columbia, James became Bob Dylan's emissary at the label and was reportedly one of the only "suits" Dylan trusted; he conducted for CBS the earliest available taped interview with Dylan, of which a fragment is available.

Sent to the West Coast, James found himself in the middle of the West Coast music scene. He wrote liner notes for The Byrds' first album, Mr. Tambourine Man, and brought artists such as The Doors and Jackson Browne to the attention of Elektra Records. In 1966, he managed the folk singer Penny Nichols, who was hired by The Sandpipers, but sang with them on just one concert in San Diego.

James was respected by artists and his peers for his humor, irreverence, intelligence and integrity in an industry that rarely fostered the latter.

By the early 1980s, James left the record business and worked for a time as an advocate for songwriters at the National Academy of Songwriters and as a board member for the local chapter of NARAS. In the 1990s, James worked as a publicist in the high-tech world.

In 2016, James' 2013 interview was featured in Danny Says alongside Danny Fields, Iggy Pop & Alice Cooper.

Semi-retired, he lives with his wife and family in Redwood City, California.
