= Here Without You (The Byrds song) =

Song by the Byrds

from the album Mr. Tambourine Man
- Released: June 21, 1965
- Recorded: April 22, 1965
- Studio: Columbia, Hollywood, California
- Genre: Folk rock
- Length: 2:38
- Label: Columbia
- Songwriter(s): Gene Clark
- Producer(s): Terry Melcher

"Here Without You" is a song written by Gene Clark that was first performed on the Byrds' 1965 debut album Mr. Tambourine Man. It was later covered by other artists, including Reigning Sound and Richard Thompson.

== Lyrics and music ==
"Here Without You" is one of the earliest original songs written by one of the Byrds, dating back to 1964 when the band was known as the Jet Set. It was recorded at Columbia Studios in Hollywood, CA on April 22, 1965, in the last recording session for the Mr. Tambourine Man album. It is a mid-tempo ballad which uses minor key harmonies to create a melancholy mood. AllMusic critic Matthew Greenwald suggests that the melody was inspired by The Beatles. Author James Perone notes resemblances between the vocal harmonies of "Here Without You" and those of some songs of Chad and Jeremy and the Searchers. The lyrics express the singer's loneliness. Music critic Johnny Rogan sees a resemblance between the theme of "Here Without You" and that of Hal David's "(There's) Always Something There to Remind Me", in that both songs describe the singer going through a city in which everything reminds him of a relationship that has ended. In lines such as "Streets that I walk on depress me / Ones that were happy when I was with you", Clark uses imagery to express his experiences of Los Angeles in the mid-1960s. The song provides a little bit of hope for the singer in the lines "I know it won't last / I'll see you someday." Will Levith of Ultimate Classic Rock notes that the melody combines major and minor keys and that the lyrics are both "dark and complex."

== Critical reception ==
Greenwald calls "Here Without You" a "highlight" of Mr. Tambourine Man and an example of Gene Clark's "incredible songwriting abilities." Rogan considers the song to be impressive enough "to stand along some of the best Lennon/McCartney material of the period. According to Rogan, it is "regarded among the highlights of the group's early work" and as "a crucial part of the group's history and development." In the 4th edition of The Rolling Stone Album Guide, Rob Sheffield calls it one of "the most vital songs" on Mr. Tambourine Man. AllMusic critic Richie Unterberger considers it to be "lyrically less challenging, but equally powerful musically" compared to the Bob Dylan, Pete Seeger, and Jackie DeShannon-penned songs on Mr. Tambourine Man. Levith rates it as Clark's #9 greatest composition, also praising the "baroque" 12-string guitar riff from Roger McGuinn. Despite acknowledging its beauty, Perone claims that the song "does not stand up on its own as well as Clark's best work," attributing that to the reuse of the opening melody in the more famous, later song "Eight Miles High".

== Other appearances ==
"Here Without You" was included on several Byrds' compilation albums. It was included in the 2006 box set There Is a Season. An early, alternate version was included on the 1969 album Preflyte and the 1988 album In the Beginning. It was also included on the Byrds' tribute album to Gene Clark, Set You Free: Gene Clark in the Byrds 1964–1973.

Richard Thompson, Clive Gregson, and Christine Collister covered "Here Without You" on the 1989 Byrds' tribute album Time Between – A Tribute to The Byrds. Thompson also included the song on his 2003 album More Guitar. Reigning Sound released a version of the song on a 2001 single.

The song is covered on the 1991 release Mavericks, a project by The dB's principals Peter Holsapple and Chris Stamey.

The song is covered on the 2000 release by Sui Generis, for the reunion album Sinfonías para Adolescentes appearing as "Aqui sin tu amor". The lyrics were translated by Charly Garcia keeping the meaning of the song but changing the real translation.
