= Preflyte =

Compilation album by the Byrds
- Released: July 29, 1969
- Recorded: c. September 1964 – January 1965
- Studio: World Pacific, Los Angeles
- Genre: Folk rock
- Length: 25:38
- Label: Together
- Producer: Jim Dickson

The Byrds chronology
Dr. Byrds & Mr. Hyde (1969)	Preflyte (1969)	Ballad of Easy Rider (1969)

Alternative cover
- Cover of the 1973 Columbia Records reissue. Art by Barry Windsor-Smith

Preflyte is a compilation album by the American folk rock band the Byrds and was released in July 1969 on Together Records. The album is a collection of demos recorded by the Byrds (then named the Jet Set) at World Pacific Studios in Los Angeles during late 1964, before the band had signed to Columbia Records and become famous. It includes early demo versions of the songs "Here Without You", "You Won't Have to Cry", "I Knew I'd Want You", and "Mr. Tambourine Man", all of which appeared in re-recorded form on the band's 1965 debut album.

The album peaked at number 84 on the Billboard Top LPs chart upon its initial release, but failed to chart in the UK when it was issued there in 1973. The album's title is a deliberate misspelling of "pre-flight", meant to emulate the misspelling of "birds" that the band had used for their name.

== History ==
Initially inspired by the success of the Beatles, folk singers Jim McGuinn and Gene Clark began playing as a duo in Los Angeles folk clubs in early 1964 and were soon joined by fellow folkie, David Crosby. The trio named themselves the Jet Set, a name chosen by McGuinn and inspired by his love of aeronautics. Crosby introduced McGuinn and Clark to his associate Jim Dickson who had access to World Pacific Studios, where he had been recording demos of Crosby. Dickson was impressed enough by the trio to take on management duties for the group and to utilize World Pacific as a rehearsal studio, where he recorded the band as they honed their craft and perfected their blend of Beatles pop and Bob Dylan-style folk.

Dickson arranged a one-off deal with Elektra Records' founder, Jac Holzman, for two songs from the World Pacific sessions, "Please Let Me Love You" and "Don't Be Long", to be released as a single on Elektra in October 1964. In an attempt to cash in on the British Invasion that was then dominating the U.S. music scene, the single was issued under the suitably British sounding pseudonym of the Beefeaters, but it failed to chart. Both songs on the Beefeaters' single featured McGuinn, Clark and Crosby, along with "Wrecking Crew" session musicians Ray Pohlman on bass and Earl Palmer on drums.

Soon after, the Jet Set expanded their ranks to include drummer Michael Clarke and bass player Chris Hillman. The rehearsal and recording sessions at World Pacific studios came to a close when the Jet Set (soon to be renamed the Byrds) signed a recording contract with Columbia Records on November 10, 1964.

== Album origin ==
In 1969, the manager of rock music for RCA Records on the West Coast, Dick Moreland, heard about the existence of these early Byrds' demo recordings from Jim Dickson and immediately told producer Gary Usher about them. Usher, who had produced the Byrds' Younger Than Yesterday, The Notorious Byrd Brothers and Sweetheart of the Rodeo albums, had recently formed Together Records with colleagues Curt Boettcher and Keith Olsen. Prior to the formation of Together, Usher had been involved with the Columbia Records' release of Conspicuous Only in its Absence, a collection of previously unheard live recordings by the psychedelic band the Great Society (featuring Grace Slick of Jefferson Airplane). The album had enjoyed moderate success and Usher was keen to continue issuing previously unreleased, historically significant material on his new record label. Usher met with Dickson and was able to acquire all of the Byrds' World Pacific tapes that still existed for a reasonable sum. The tapes were then edited and compiled into an eleven track running order, before being remixed and mastered by Keith Olsen.

Dickson approached the five original members of the Byrds in order to have them sign a letter of permission to authorize the release of these early recordings. Crosby was initially reluctant to sanction the release, but he was eventually persuaded by his friend and singing partner, Graham Nash, who convinced Crosby of the musical worth and historical value of the recordings. Dickson later recalled Nash's involvement during a 1977 interview: "Graham Nash said that the songs were charming baby pictures. You have to get a little older before you can tolerate seeing your baby pictures out there. We were all babies once! Graham just charmed David's socks off." With the permission of all five original members of the band secured, Together Records released the album in July 1969 with a great deal of publicity. As a collection of previously unreleased demo recordings, Preflyte can be seen as one of the earliest examples of issuing outtakes by popular artists, a practice that is now commonplace in the reissue market.

== Music ==
All of the music on Preflyte predates the release of the Byrds' debut single for Columbia, a cover version of Bob Dylan's "Mr. Tambourine Man", which topped the charts in America and the United Kingdom during 1965. Of the album's eleven songs, seven had never before been released by the Byrds. These previously unreleased songs included five written solely by Gene Clark: "The Reason Why", "She Has a Way", "For Me Again", "Boston", and "You Movin'". Of these, "She Has a Way" had been re-recorded by the Byrds during sessions for their debut album, Mr. Tambourine Man. However, this Columbia recording of the song was discarded at the eleventh hour and remained unreleased until its appearance on the Byrds' archival album, Never Before, in 1987.

"The Reason Why", a brooding, Beatles and Everly Brothers influenced ballad, and the melancholy "For Me Again", would both be jettisoned from the band's repertoire by early 1965 to make way for higher quality material. The uptempo "Boston" and "You Movin'" were never seriously intended for release by the band and had been written purely to give fans something to dance to during the Byrds' early concert performances.

A further two Clark compositions included on Preflyte, "Here Without You" and "I Knew I'd Want You", had appeared in re-recorded versions on the band's debut album, with the latter also appearing on the B-side of the "Mr. Tambourine Man" single. In total, there were nine songs included on Preflyte that were either written or co-written by Clark, highlighting his early songwriting dominance over the group.

The album also featured the Crosby and McGuinn penned "The Airport Song", a hauntingly romantic composition with subtle jazz overtones, highlighted by Crosby's clear lead vocal and Clark's wistful harmonica playing. The song was inspired by the time that Crosby and McGuinn had spent hanging out at Los Angeles International Airport, watching planes come in to land.

The album also included two McGuinn and Clark compositions, "You Showed Me" and "You Won't Have to Cry", the latter of which had already appeared in a different version on the band's debut album. "You Showed Me" had not been released by the Byrds, but a cover of it had been a hit single for the Turtles in early 1969 and had peaked at number 6 on the Billboard Hot 100.

The embryonic version of "Mr. Tambourine Man" included on Preflyte illustrated how the song sounded prior to its recording as the band's debut single for Columbia Records. The Byrds' biographer Johnny Rogan has stated that McGuinn's distinctive Bach-inspired guitar intro is already present in this early version, but Crosby's harmony singing displays signs of uncertainty. Rogan has also remarked that perhaps the most striking difference between the version of the song found on Preflyte and the more famous Columbia recording is Michael Clarke's use of a militaristic drumming style. This military band style of drumming was abandoned when the song was recorded for the Columbia single on January 20, 1965, with session drummer Hal Blaine adopting a standard rock beat instead.

== Release and reception ==
Professional ratings
Review scores
Source	Rating
AllMusic	4/5 stars
Classic Rock	7/10 stars
entertainment.ie	3/5 stars
Rolling Stone	(favorable)

Preflyte was released on July 29, 1969 in the United States on Together Records (catalogue item ST-T-1001), but it was not issued in the United Kingdom until January 1973, when it was released by Kim Fowley's Bumble record label (catalogue item GEXP 8001). It was then reissued in the U.S. in April 1973 by Columbia Records (catalogue item C 32183), with alternative cover artwork by British comic book artist Barry Windsor-Smith, depicting the five original members of the Byrds as futuristic astronauts.

Upon initial release, sales of Preflyte were fairly good in the U.S., resulting in the album outperforming the Byrds' most recent studio offering, Dr. Byrds & Mr. Hyde. The album managed to climb to number 84 on the Billboard Top LPs chart in 1969, and again charted in America at number 183 when it was reissued by Columbia in 1973. It was less successful in the United Kingdom, however, where it failed to enter the UK Albums Chart when it was issued there in 1973.

The album was met with mixed reviews, with Lester Bangs in Rolling Stone magazine criticizing the sub-standard sound quality of the recordings, but also noting that the songs on the album "still overflow with that unique unschmaltzy beauty and lyricism that has been the Byrds' trademark." Lenny Kaye, writing in Jazz & Pop magazine, praised the album, noting that "One of the more interesting things about Preflyte is the consistency of the Byrds sound, especially when compared with their later post-Tambourine Man days."

In more recent years, Classic Rock reviewer Rob Hughes praised "the purring harmonies, the extraordinary songcraft of frontman Gene Clark and the smooth exhalations of what became the California folk-rock sound", despite the fact that the Byrds had "yet to become competent musicians". Andrew Lynch, writing for the entertainment.ie website, described the album as "a fascinating slice of pop history and a pretty good album in its own right too."

In 1988 Rhino Records released another compilation of recordings from the Byrds' 1964 World Pacific sessions, entitled In the Beginning, which consisted largely of previously unreleased recordings. The first CD release of Preflyte came in 2001 from Alan McGee's Poptones record label. Later that year Sundazed Music released a 2 CD compilation of tracks from the World Pacific era titled The Preflyte Sessions. This double CD compilation included all of the tracks originally released on Preflyte, along with other tracks that had first appeared on In the Beginning and fourteen previously unreleased recordings. The Preflyte Sessions also included four recordings made by David Crosby at World Pacific studios in 1963 and 1964, before the formation of the Jet Set. In tandem with the release of The Preflyte Sessions, Sundazed also issued a 7" single featuring previously unreleased 1964 recordings of "You Movin'" and "Boston", neither of which were included on The Preflyte Sessions album. As of 2010, the two World Pacific recordings of "You Movin'" and "Boston" found on this single have not been released on CD.

In 2006, Sundazed Music reissued the original Preflyte album in a remastered edition.

In 2012, Floating World Records issued another compilation of the Byrds' World Pacific recordings titled Preflyte Plus. This compilation was essentially a re-release of the earlier Sundazed 2 CD compilation, but with an additional eight previously unreleased tracks.

== Track listing ==
All tracks written by Gene Clark except noted.

=== Side one ===
No.	Title	Writer(s)	Length
1.	"You Showed Me"	Jim McGuinn, Gene Clark	2:05
2.	"Here Without You"		2:30
3.	"She Has a Way"		2:34
4.	"The Reason Why"		2:34
5.	"For Me Again"		2:32
6.	"Boston"		2:07

=== Side two ===
No.	Title	Writer(s)	Length
1.	"You Movin'"		2:10
2.	"The Airport Song"	Jim McGuinn, David Crosby	2:03
3.	"You Won't Have to Cry"	Jim McGuinn, Gene Clark	2:17
4.	"I Knew I'd Want You"		2:19
5.	"Mr. Tambourine Man"	Bob Dylan	2:20

== The Preflyte Sessions track listing ==
=== Disc one ===
1. "The Reason Why" [Version #2] (Gene Clark) – 2:38
2. "You Won't Have to Cry" [Electric Version] (Jim McGuinn, Gene Clark) – 2:17
3. "She Has a Way" [Version #4] (Gene Clark) – 2:29
4. "You Showed Me" [Electric Version] (Jim McGuinn, Gene Clark) – 1:53
5. "Here Without You" [Version #2] (Gene Clark) – 2:28
6. "Don't Be Long" (Jim McGuinn, Harvey Gerst) – 1:58
7. "I Knew I'd Want You" [Electric Version #2] (Gene Clark) – 2:14
8. "Boston" [Version #2] (Gene Clark) – 2:15
9. "Tomorrow Is a Long Ways Away" [Electric Version] (Jim McGuinn, Gene Clark, David Crosby) – 1:59
10. "For Me Again" [Version #2] (Gene Clark) – 2:39
11. "It's No Use" [Version #2] (Jim McGuinn, Gene Clark) – 2:20
12. "You Movin'" [Version #3] (Gene Clark) – 2:08
13. "Please Let Me Love You" (Gene Clark, Jim McGuinn, Harvey Gerst) – 2:25
14. "The Airport Song" (Jim McGuinn, David Crosby) – 2:03
15. "Mr. Tambourine Man" [Electric Version] (Bob Dylan) – 2:25
16. "She Has a Way" [Version #3] (Gene Clark) – 2:33
17. "I Knew I'd Want You" [Electric Version #1] (Gene Clark) – 2:31
18. "Boston" [Instrumental Track] (Gene Clark) – 2:15
19. "You Showed Me" [Instrumental Track] (Jim McGuinn, Gene Clark) – 2:06
20. "The Times They Are a-Changin'" [Instrumental Track] (Bob Dylan) – 2:26

=== Disc two ===
1. "The Only Girl I Adore" (Jim McGuinn, Gene Clark) – 2:26
2. "Tomorrow Is a Long Ways Away" [Acoustic Version] (Gene Clark) – 2:01
3. "You Showed Me" [Acoustic Version] (Jim McGuinn, Gene Clark) – 2:04
4. "I Knew I'd Want You" [Acoustic Version] (Gene Clark) – 2:18
5. "You Won't Have to Cry" [Acoustic Version] (Jim McGuinn, Gene Clark) – 2:21
6. "Mr. Tambourine Man" [Acoustic Version] (Bob Dylan) – 2:14
7. "Willie Jean" (Hoyt Axton) – 2:08
8. "Come Back Baby" (Ray Charles) – 2:26
9. "Jack of Diamonds" (traditional, arranged David Crosby) – 1:46
10. "Get Together" (Dino Valenti) – 2:34
11. "She Has a Way" [Version #1] (Gene Clark) – 2:23
12. "Here Without You" [Version #1] (Gene Clark) – 2:29
13. "For Me Again" [Version #1] (Gene Clark) – 2:32
14. "It's No Use" [Version #1] (Jim McGuinn, Gene Clark) – 2:17
15. "You Movin'" [Version #1] (Gene Clark) – 2:10
16. "Boston" [Version #1] (Gene Clark) – 2:09
17. "She Has a Way" [Version #2] (Gene Clark) – 2:32
18. "You Movin'" [Version #2] (Gene Clark) – 2:12
19. "The Reason Why" [Version #1] (Gene Clark) – 2:31
20. "It's No Use" [Version #3] (Jim McGuinn, Gene Clark) – 3:38
  - NOTE: this song ends at 2:09; at 2:18 begins "Studio Chat"
- NOTE: Tracks 7–10 were recorded prior to the formation of the Byrds and are performed by David Crosby with backing musicians Tommy Tedesco (electric guitar), Ray Pohlman (electric bass) and Earl Palmer (drums). The initial release of "The Only Girl I Adore" erroneously credited the song to Jim McGuinn and David Crosby.

=== The Preflyte Plus track listing ===
The 2012 CD reissue titled Preflyte Plus is essentially the same compilation as The Preflyte Session 2-disc set, with the following songs added to the end of disc 2:

2012 bonus tracks
No.	Title	Writer(s)	Length
21.	"Tomorrow Is a Long Ways Away"	Gene Clark	2:02
22.	"You Won't Have to Cry"	Jim McGuinn, Gene Clark	2:22
23.	"You Showed Me"	Jim McGuinn, Gene Clark	2:06
24.	"I Knew I'd Want You" (Acoustic)	Gene Clark	2:19
25.	"Mr. Tambourine Man"	Bob Dylan	2:15
26.	"She's the Kind of Girl"	Gene Clark	3:06
27.	"I'm Just a Young Man"	David Crosby	2:08
28.	"Everybody's Been Burned"	David Crosby	3:05

== Personnel ==
Sources for this section are as follows:

- Jim McGuinn – lead guitar, vocals
- Gene Clark – percussion, harmonica, guitar, vocals
- David Crosby – guitar, vocals
- Chris Hillman – bass guitar
- Michael Clarke – drums, percussion

== Release history ==
Date	Label	Format	Country	Catalog #	Notes
July 29, 1969	Together	LP	US	ST-1-1001	original release.
January 1973	Bumble	LP	UK	GEXP 8001	
April 27, 1973	Columbia	LP	US	C 32183	
1973	Ariola	LP	Holland	86 468 IT	
July 9, 2001	Poptones	CD	UK	MC5044CD	
December 3, 2001	Poptones	LP	UK	MC33150441LP	
December 17, 2001	Sundazed	CD	US	SC 11116	The Preflyte Sessions expanded release.
December 18, 2001	Sundazed	LP	US	LP 5114	The Preflyte Sessions expanded release.
February 21, 2006	Sundazed	CD	US	SC 6234	
February 27, 2012	Floating World	CD	UK	FLOATD6122	Preflyte Plus: reissue of the earlier Sundazed compilation with extra tracks.
June 14, 2012	Air Mail Archive	CD	JPN	AIRAC 1659/61	Preflyte – Complete Edition: Blu-spec CD reissue of the Together, Bumble and Columbia releases of Preflyte in miniature replica LP sleeves.

== Bibliography ==
- Rogan, Johnny, The Byrds: Timeless Flight Revisited, Rogan House, 1998, ISBN 0-9529540-1-X
- Hjort, Christopher (2008). So You Want to Be a Rock 'N' Roll Star: The Byrds Day-by-Day 1965-1973. London: Jawbone Press. ISBN 978-1-906002-15-2.
