= In the Beginning (The Byrds album) =

Compilation album by the Byrds
- Released: August 1988
- Recorded: Mid-1964 – November 1964
- Studio: World Pacific Studios, Los Angeles, CA
- Genre: Pop, folk rock
- Length: 38:13
- Label: Rhino
- Producer: Jim Dickson

The Byrds chronology
| Never Before (1987) | In the Beginning (1988) | The Byrds (1990) |

In the Beginning is a compilation album by the American folk rock band the Byrds and was released in August 1988 by Rhino Records. It features demo recordings made during 1964, before the band became famous.

== Contents ==
In the Beginning compiles demos, some of which were previously unreleased, that were recorded during 1964 at World Pacific Studios in Los Angeles, before the band had secured a recording contract with Columbia Records. Material dating from the band's pre-fame rehearsal sessions at World Pacific had previously appeared on the 1969 album Preflyte, but In the Beginning provides a more comprehensive overview of this period than the earlier compilation.

During preparation for the album, Rhino Records elected to include as many previously unreleased versions of songs as possible, rather than simply duplicate the contents of the Preflyte album. As a result of this, of the seventeen tracks that make up In the Beginning, only five are exactly the same recordings that were included on the earlier compilation album.

In the Beginning also includes six alternate takes of songs that appeared on Preflyte. In addition, the album also features alternate versions of both sides of a one-off single that the group released on Elektra Records in 1964 (under the pseudonym of the Beefeaters); a primitive acoustic demo of "The Only Girl I Adore" which had previously been released on the Early LA various artists compilation; a previously unreleased early version of "It's No Use"; and two recordings of the previously unreleased song "Tomorrow Is a Long Ways Away".

Noting the album's emphasis on newly released material, the Byrds' biographer Johnny Rogan commented that In the Beginning took "the brave decision to include as many alternate takes as possible, irrespective of their quality", and concluded that the "CD captured the very genesis of the Byrds." Music historian and journalist Richie Unterberger, writing for the Allmusic website, has described the music on the album as "excellent, though more tentative and less polished than their 'official' Columbia work." However, Unterberger also complained that "some of the alternate takes are inferior to those on the original Preflyte album."

Upon release, In the Beginning garnered mostly positive reviews from critics, but failed to reach the Billboard Top Pop Albums chart or the UK Albums Chart.

The album is currently out of print and has been supplanted by the two exhaustive double CD compilations, The Preflyte Sessions and Preflyte Plus.

== Track listing ==
NOTE: The following track listing is for the CD release only. The vinyl LP omits the tracks "The Reason Why", "Mr. Tambourine Man", and "Tomorrow Is a Long Ways Away" [acoustic version].

1. "Tomorrow Is a Long Ways Away" (Gene Clark, David Crosby, Roger McGuinn) – 1:56
2. "Boston" (Gene Clark) – 2:07
3. "The Only Girl I Adore" (Roger McGuinn, David Crosby) – 2:26
4. "You Won't Have to Cry" (Roger McGuinn, Gene Clark) – 2:16
5. "I Knew I'd Want You" (Gene Clark) – 2:14
6. "The Airport Song" (Roger McGuinn, David Crosby) – 2:03
7. "The Reason Why" (Gene Clark) – 2:35
8. "Mr. Tambourine Man" (Bob Dylan) – 2:11
9. "Please Let Me Love You" (Gene Clark, Roger McGuinn, Harvey Gerst) – 2:35
10. "You Movin'" (Gene Clark) – 2:09
11. "It Won't Be Wrong" (Roger McGuinn, Harvey Gerst) – 2:01
12. "You Showed Me" (Roger McGuinn, Gene Clark) – 1:52
13. "She Has a Way" (Gene Clark) – 2:26
14. "For Me Again" (Gene Clark) – 2:32
15. "It's No Use" (Gene Clark, Roger McGuinn) – 2:17
16. "Here Without You" (Gene Clark) – 2:26
17. "Tomorrow Is a Long Ways Away" [acoustic version] (Gene Clark) – 1:58

== Personnel ==
The Byrds

- Jim McGuinn - lead guitar, vocals
- Gene Clark - percussion, harmonica, guitar, vocals
- David Crosby - guitar, vocals
- Chris Hillman - electric bass
- Michael Clarke - drums, percussion

Additional Personnel

- Ray Pohlman – electric bass (tracks 9 and 11)
- Earl Palmer – drums (tracks 9 and 11)
