= Jerry Cole =

American guitarist (1939–2008)

- Born: Jerald Edward Kolbrak; September 23, 1939; Green Bay, Wisconsin, United States
- Died: May 28, 2008 (aged 68) Corona, California, United States
- Genres: Rock, country
- Occupation: Session musician
- Instrument: Guitar

Jerald Edward Kolbrak (September 23, 1939 – May 28, 2008), known professionally as Jerry Cole, was an American guitarist who recorded under his own name, as well as under various budget album pseudonyms and as an uncredited session musician.

== Biography ==
Raised in Chicago, Cole first entered the pop music scene as one of The Champs along with Glen Campbell. Campbell and Cole and fellow bandmembers Jimmy Seals and Dash Crofts left The Champs in 1961 to form The Gee Cees and released one noncharting instrumental single called "Buzz Saw" with Crest Records.

Cole increased his income and recordings by playing for various budget albums with a variety of credits. In an interview with Psychotronic Video issue #31, Cole explained his dealings with Crown Records. Crown would request five surf albums, five country and western albums and five easy listening albums. Cole would write nine different songs for each album to back one cover version of a hit of the time, organize a band, arrange and record the music for master tapes that he would deliver to Crown in about three weeks time; doing an album or two in a day.

Impressed by his playing as a session musician, Bobby Darin recommended him to Capitol Records where he led an instrumental surf guitar group called "Jerry Cole and his Spacemen". Capitol tried Cole as a vocalist but found his voice wasn't strong enough. Among his records for Capitol as a vocalist was the original version of "Midnight Mary" (spelled as "Midnite Mary" on the record), a top 10 hit for Joey Powers.

Throughout the 1960s, Cole was a highly sought-after session player, working with The Byrds ("Mr. Tambourine Man" / "I Knew I'd Want You"), Nancy Sinatra ("These Boots Are Made for Walkin'"), The Beach Boys (Pet Sounds LP) and Paul Revere & the Raiders ("Kicks") among others. He recorded as one of "The Wrecking Crew" and as a writer, arranger and conductor for numerous pop groups and performers and performed on many American television shows of the time. He led the pit bands of the teenage music shows Hullabaloo and Shindig!. His bandleader abilities were also tapped by Frank Sinatra, Dean Martin, Roger Miller, and Ricky Nelson and he was a first-call guitarist on TV show bands for Andy Williams, Sonny & Cher, The Smothers Brothers, Laugh In, and Dick Van Dyke.

Cole pulled together some L.A. session colleagues and cut his own psychedelic album: The Inner Sounds of the Id by 'The Id', recorded between 1965 and 1966 according to drummer Don Dexter. The musicians were: Jerry Cole (lead guitar, lead vocals, sitar), Don Dexter (drums, backing vocals), Glenn Cass (bass, backing vocals) and his brother Norman Cass (rhythm guitar, backing vocals). A massive collection of tracks were pared down to ten tracks and those ten tracks were released by RCA in January 1967. The Animated Egg's self-titled album was released on the Alshire label in 1967 under the auspices of producer-manager Paul Arnold, who reportedly absconded with the unreleased Id material. However, shortly before his death, Cole determined that the Animated Egg tracks were probably recorded at a different session, and may have involved different musicians working with Cole. Either way, the Id and Animated Egg tapes were both subsequently recycled by Arnold for a series of releases including the 101 Strings' orchestral-overdubbed Astro-Sounds From Beyond the Year 2000. Cashing in on Jimi Hendrix's untimely death, many of the same tracks were also given new titles and released as a tribute album credited to The Black Diamonds. On October 15, 2006, Cole performed, as a lead guitarist, with his friend Dick Burns, of the original Dartells, as a "New Dartell" in the KVEN "Boomer Blast" oldies concert at the Oxnard Performing Arts Plaza, although he was not included in the then still uncompleted album Mo' Pastrami, which did include Freddy Cannon, Donny Brooks and Jewel Akens.

Jerry Cole started Happy Tiger Records with producer-manager Ray Ruff in 1969. As one of Ruff's acts – a post-Van Morrison line-up of Them – had just broken up, Cole joined the band for their self-titled 1970 hard rock album for the label, credited as lead vocalist, guitarist and drummer alongside uncredited musicians Ry Cooder, Johnny Stark, Jack Nitzsche and Billy Preston.

Cole teamed up with Roger McGuinn again in 1972 for McGuinn's debut solo record, while session work with Roger Miller, Chuck Howard and Susie Allanson sent him in a country-rock direction. The list of names Cole worked with as guitarist, vocalist, writer, arranger, producer, or bandleader includes: Jerry Lee Lewis, Roy Orbison, Aretha Franklin, The Righteous Brothers, Little Richard, Dean Martin, Merle Haggard, Ray Charles, Tony Orlando & Dawn, Lou Rawls, Johnny Rivers, Gregg Allman, Lee Hazlewood, Blood Sweat & Tears, Kenny Rogers, Neil Diamond, Steely Dan, and Isaac Hayes.

Cole died of a heart attack at his Corona, California, home at the age of 68.

== Discography ==
Pseudonymous albums recorded for Crown Records:

- Billy Boyd - "Twangy Guitars" LP (Crown CST-196), 1960
  - Don & Eddie - "Rock and Roll Party" (Modern MST-814, - same as the 'Billy Boyd' LP above), 1961
  - The Electric Underground - "Guitar Explosion" (Premier PS-9060, - same as the 'Billy Boyd' LP above, with different mix and 2 fewer tracks), 1967
- Don Dailey - "Surf Stompin'" LP (Crown CST-314 - same as the 'Billy Boyd' LP above), 1963
- The Hot Rodders - "Big Hot Rod" LP (Crown CST-378), 1963
- The Scramblers - "Cycle Psychos" LP (Crown CST-384), 1963
- Jerry Kole and the Strokers - "Hot Rod Alley" LP (Crown CST-385), 1963
- The Blasters - "Sounds of the Drags" LP (Crown CST-392), 1963
- The Shut Downs - "The Deuce Coupes" LP (Crown CST-393), 1963
- The Winners - "Checkered Flag" LP (Crown CST-394), 1963
- Johnny Rivers and Jerry Cole - "Johnny Rivers and Jerry Cole" LP (Crown CLP-5475), 1964
- The Stingers - "Guitars a Go Go" LP (Crown CST-476), 1964
- Jerry Cole and the Country Boys - "Crazy Arms and Other Country & Western Instrumental Favorites" LP (Crown CST-518), 1964?
- Jerry Cole & The Stingers - "Guitars a Go-Go Vol. 2" LP (Crown CST-553), 1966
  - Jerry Cole - "Hot Rod Twangin' - The 1960s Crown Recordings" (Ace Records CD), 2006

Albums recorded for Capitol Records (1963–64):

- Jerry Cole and His Spacemen - "Surf Age"
- Jerry Cole and His Spacemen - "Hot Rod Dance Party"
- Jerry Cole and His Spacemen - "Outer Limits"
  - Jerry Cole and His Spacemen - "Power Surf! The Best of Jerry Cole & His Spacemen" (Sundazed CD), 1999

Other pseudonymous recordings attributed to Jerry Cole:

- Billy Baker - "Country Guitar" (Viking, UK)
- The Super Stocks - "Thunder Road"
- Mike Adams & The Red Jackets - "Surfers Beat"
- Eddy Wayne - "The Ping Pong Sounds of Guitars in Percussion"
- The Knights - "Hot Rod High"
- Billy J. Tyler
- The Palomino Boys
- The Id - "The Inner Sounds of the Id" (RCA Victor LSP 3805), 1967
- The Animated Egg - "The Animated Egg" (Alshire 5104), 1967

Recordings from the Id & Animated Egg album sessions were repackaged/remixed many times, including:

  - The Projection Company - "Give Me Some Lovin'" (Custom CS-1113), 1967
  - T. Swift & The Electric Bag - "Are You Experienced?" (Custom CS-1115), 1968
  - The Generation Gap - "Up Up and Away" (Custom CS-1121)
  - The Stone Canyon Rock Group - "MacArthur Park" (Custom CS-1124), 1968
  - Various Artists - "Young Sound '68" (Somerset SF-31500), 1968
  - The Haircuts & The Impossibles - "Call It Soul!" (Somerset SF-33400), 1969
  - 101 Strings - "Astro-Sounds From Beyond the Year 2000" (Alshire 5119), 1969
  - The Black Diamonds - "A Tribute to Jimi Hendrix" (Alshire 5220), 1971
  - Bebe Bardon & 101 Strings - "The "Exotic" Sounds of Love" (Alshire 201), 1972
  - The Animated Egg - "Guitar Freakout" (Sundazed CD reissue, adding out-takes which were unique to the cash-in releases), 2008
- The Mustang - "Organ Freakout!" (Somerset SF-28600), 1968 (apparently The Id backing keyboardist Paul "The Mustang" Griffin)
- Them - "Them" (Happy Tiger), 1970 (Fallout Records CD issue, 2008)
