= Mr. Tambourine Man =

1965 song by Bob Dylan

- Cover of the M. Witmark & Sons sheet music

Song by Bob Dylan

from the album Bringing It All Back Home
- Released: March 22, 1965
- Recorded: January 15, 1965
- Studio: Columbia, New York City
- Genre: Folk
- Length: 5:32
- Label: Columbia
- Songwriter: Bob Dylan
- Producer: Tom Wilson

Audio sample
- file; help

"Mr. Tambourine Man" is a song written by Bob Dylan, released as the first track of the acoustic side of his March 1965 album Bringing It All Back Home. The song's popularity led to Dylan recording it live many times, and it has been included in multiple compilation albums. It has been translated into other languages and has been used or referenced in television shows, films, and books.

The song has been performed and recorded by many artists, including the Byrds, Judy Collins, Melanie, Odetta, Alvin and the Chipmunks, and Stevie Wonder among others. The Byrds' version was released in April 1965 as their first single on Columbia Records, reaching number 1 on both the Billboard Hot 100 chart and the UK Singles Chart, as well as being the title track of their debut album, Mr. Tambourine Man. The Byrds' recording of the song was influential in popularizing the musical subgenres of folk rock and jangle pop, leading many contemporary bands to mimic its fusion of jangly guitars and intellectual lyrics in the wake of the single's success. Dylan himself was partly influenced to record with electric instrumentation after hearing the Byrds' reworking of his song during one of their rehearsals at World Pacific Studios in late 1964.

Dylan's song has four verses, of which the Byrds only used the second for their recording. Dylan's and the Byrds' versions have appeared on various lists ranking the greatest songs of all time, including an appearance by both on Rolling Stone's 2004 list of the 500 best songs ever. Both versions received Grammy Hall of Fame Awards.

The song has a bright, expansive melody and has become famous for its surrealistic imagery, influenced by artists as diverse as French poet Arthur Rimbaud and Italian filmmaker Federico Fellini. The lyrics call on the title character to play a song and the narrator will follow. Interpretations of the lyrics have included a paean to drugs such as LSD, a call to the singer's muse, a reflection of the audience's demands on the singer, and religious interpretations.

== Composition ==
"Mr. Tambourine Man" was written and composed in early 1964, at the same approximate time as "Chimes of Freedom", which Dylan recorded later that spring for his album Another Side of Bob Dylan. Dylan began writing and composing "Mr. Tambourine Man" in February 1964, after attending Mardi Gras in New Orleans during a cross-country road trip with several friends, and completed it sometime between the middle of March and late April of that year after he had returned to New York. Nigel Williamson has suggested in The Rough Guide to Bob Dylan that the influence of Mardi Gras can be heard in the swirling and fanciful imagery of the song's lyrics. Journalist Al Aronowitz has stated that Dylan completed the song at his home, but folk singer Judy Collins, who later recorded the song, has stated that Dylan completed the song at her home. Dylan premiered the song the following month at a May 17 concert at London's Royal Festival Hall.

== Recording ==
During the sessions for Another Side of Bob Dylan, in June 1964, with Tom Wilson producing, Dylan recorded "Mr. Tambourine Man" with Ramblin' Jack Elliott singing harmony. As Elliott was slightly off key, that recording was not used. Later that month he recorded a publisher demo of the song at Witmark Music. More than six months passed before Dylan re-recorded the song, again with Wilson in the producer's chair, during the final Bringing It All Back Home session on January 15, 1965, the same day that "Gates of Eden", "It's Alright, Ma (I'm Only Bleeding)", and "It's All Over Now, Baby Blue" were recorded. It was long thought that the four songs were each recorded in one long take. However, in the biography Bob Dylan: Behind the Shades, Clinton Heylin relates that the song required six attempts, possibly because of difficulties in working out the playoffs between Dylan's acoustic guitar and Bruce Langhorne's electric lead. Alternate takes released on Dylan's Cutting Edge collection also reveal that early takes include drummer Bobby Gregg playing a tambourine-heavy 2/4 rhythm, but Dylan found this too distracting and opted to continue recording with Langhorne alone. The final take was selected for the album, which was released on March 22, 1965.

In his book Keys to the Rain: The Definitive Bob Dylan Encyclopedia, Oliver Trager describes "Mr. Tambourine Man" as having a bright, expansive melody, with Langhorne's electric guitar accompaniment, which provides a countermelody to the vocals, being the only instrumentation besides Dylan's acoustic guitar and harmonica. Author Wilfrid Mellers has written that although the song is in the key of D major, it is harmonized as if it were in a Lydian G major, giving the song a tonal ambiguity that enhances the dreamy quality of the melody. Unusually, rather than beginning with the first verse, the song begins with an iteration of the chorus:

Hey! Mr. Tambourine Man, play a song for me,
I'm not sleepy and there is no place I'm going to.
Hey! Mr. Tambourine Man, play a song for me,
In the jingle-jangle morning I'll come following you.

== Interpretations ==
William Ruhlmann, writing for the AllMusic web site, has suggested the following outline of the song's lyrics: "The time seems to be early morning following a night when the narrator has not slept. Still unable to sleep, though amazed by his weariness, he is available and open to Mr. Tambourine Man's song, and says he will follow him. In the course of four verses studded with internal rhymes, he expounds on this situation, his meaning often heavily embroidered with imagery, though the desire to be freed by the tambourine man's song remains clear."

While there has been speculation that the song is about drugs, particularly with lines such as "take me on a trip upon your magic swirling ship" and "the smoke rings of my mind", Dylan has denied the song is about drugs. Though he was smoking marijuana at the time the song was written, Dylan was not introduced to LSD until a few months later. Outside of drug speculation, the song has been interpreted as a call to the singer's spirit or muse, or as a search for transcendence. In particular, biographer John Hinchey has suggested in his book Like a Complete Unknown that the singer is praying to his muse for inspiration; Hinchey notes that ironically the song itself is evidence the muse has already provided the sought-after inspiration. The figure of Mr. Tambourine Man has sometimes been interpreted as a symbol for Jesus or the Pied Piper of Hamelin. The song may also reference gospel music themes, with Mr. Tambourine Man being the bringer of religious salvation.

Dylan has cited the influence of Federico Fellini's movie La Strada on the song, while other commentators have found echoes of the poetry of Arthur Rimbaud. Author Howard Sounes has identified the lyrics "in the jingle jangle morning I'll come following you" as having been taken from a Lord Buckley recording. Bruce Langhorne, who performs guitar on the track, has been cited by Dylan as the inspiration for the tambourine man image in the song. Langhorne used to play a giant, four-inch-deep "tambourine" (actually a Turkish frame drum), and had brought the instrument to a previous Dylan recording session.

== Other Dylan releases ==
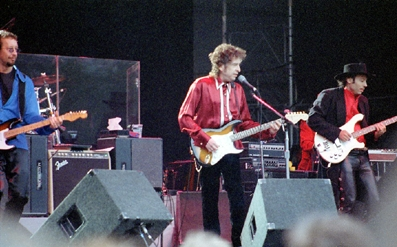
Bob Dylan has often played "Mr. Tambourine Man" in live concerts.

The Bringing it All Back Home version of "Mr. Tambourine Man" was included on Bob Dylan's Greatest Hits in 1967 and several later Dylan compilation albums, including Biograph, Masterpieces, and The Essential Bob Dylan. The two June 1964 recordings, one with Ramblin' Jack Elliott and the other at Witmark Music, have been released on The Bootleg Series Vol. 7: No Direction Home and The Bootleg Series Vol. 9: The Witmark Demos 1962–1964, respectively. Outtakes from the January 15, 1965, recording session were released on The Bootleg Series Vol. 12: The Cutting Edge 1965–1966 in 2015.

The song has been in Dylan's live concert repertoire since it was written, usually as a solo acoustic song, and live performances have appeared on various concert albums and DVDs. An early performance, perhaps the song's live debut, recorded at London's Royal Festival Hall on May 17, 1964, appeared on Live 1962-1966: Rare Performances From The Copyright Collections, while another early performance, recorded during a songs workshop at the Newport Folk Festival on July 24, 1964, was included in both Murray Lerner's film The Other Side of the Mirror and the DVD release of Martin Scorsese's documentary No Direction Home. A live performance at New York's Philharmonic Hall dating from October 31, 1964, appeared on The Bootleg Series Vol. 6: Bob Dylan Live 1964, Concert at Philharmonic Hall. During his appearance at the Newport Folk Festival on July 25, 1965, after he was heckled by acoustic folk music fans during his electric set, Dylan returned to play acoustic versions of "Mr. Tambourine Man" and "It's All Over Now, Baby Blue"; this performance of "Mr. Tambourine Man" was included in The Other Side of the Mirror.

A live version from Dylan's famous May 17, 1966, concert in Manchester, England (popularly but mistakenly known as the Royal Albert Hall Concert) was included on The Bootleg Series Vol. 4: Bob Dylan Live 1966, The "Royal Albert Hall" Concert. Dylan's August 31, 1969, performance of the song at the Isle of Wight Festival appeared on Isle of Wight Live, part of the 4-CD deluxe edition of The Bootleg Series Vol. 10: Another Self Portrait (1969–1971). Dylan played the song as part of his evening set at the 1971, Concert for Bangladesh, organized by George Harrison and Ravi Shankar, featuring Harrison on electric guitar, Leon Russell on bass, and Ringo Starr on tambourine. That performance was included on The Concert For Bangladesh album, although it was excluded from the film of the concert. Another live version, from the Rolling Thunder Revue tour of 1975, was included on The Bootleg Series Vol. 5: Bob Dylan Live 1975, The Rolling Thunder Revue and The Rolling Thunder Revue: The 1975 Live Recordings, while electric band versions from 1978 and 1981 appeared, respectively, on Bob Dylan at Budokan and the Deluxe Edition of The Bootleg Series Vol. 13: Trouble No More 1979–1981.

In November 2016, all Dylan's recorded live performances of the song from 1966 were released in the boxed set The 1966 Live Recordings, with the May 26, 1966, performance released separately on the album The Real Royal Albert Hall 1966 Concert.

== The Byrds' version ==
"Mr. Tambourine Man"
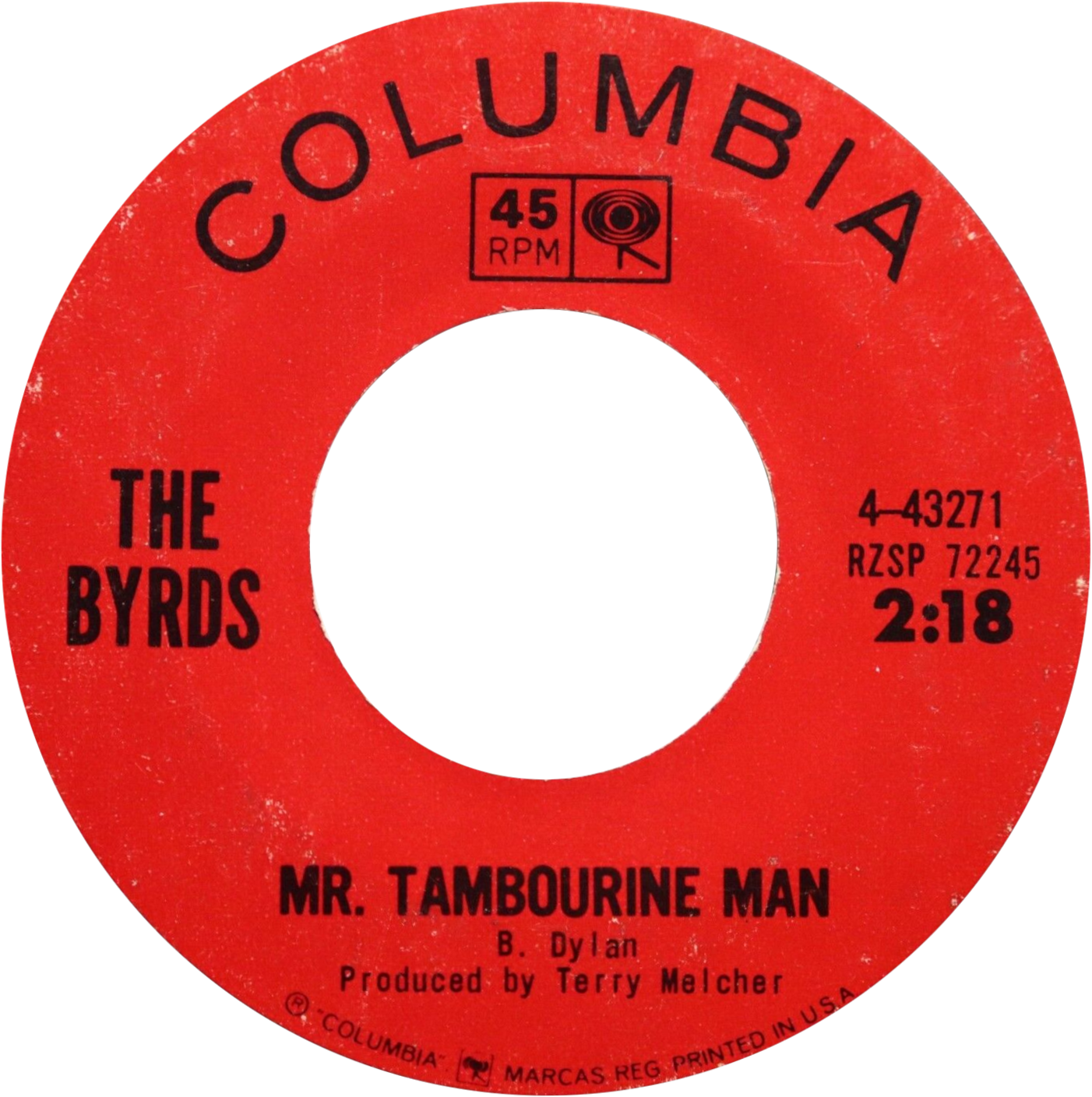
- Side A of the original US single

Single by the Byrds

from the album Mr. Tambourine Man
- B-side: "I Knew I'd Want You"
- Released: April 12, 1965
- Recorded: January 20, 1965
- Studio: Columbia, Hollywood
- Genre: Folk rock; jangle pop
- Length: 2:18
- Label: Columbia
- Songwriter: Bob Dylan
- Producer: Terry Melcher

The Byrds singles chronology
"Mr. Tambourine Man" (1965)	"All I Really Want to Do" (1965)

Audio sample
- file; help

=== Release ===
"Mr. Tambourine Man" was the debut single by the American rock band the Byrds and was released on April 12, 1965 by Columbia Records, less than a month after Dylan's original. The song was also the title track of the band's debut album, which was released on June 21, 1965. The Byrds' version is abridged and in a different key from Dylan's original.

The single's success initiated the folk rock boom of 1965 and 1966, with a number of American and British acts imitating the band's hybrid of a rock beat, jangly guitar playing, and poetic or socially conscious lyrics. The single was the "first folk rock smash hit", and gave rise to the term "folk rock" in the U.S music press to describe the band's sound.

This hybrid had its antecedents in the American folk revival of the early 1960s, the Animals' rock-oriented recording of the folk song "The House of the Rising Sun", the folk influences present in the songwriting of the Beatles, and the twelve-string guitar jangle of the Searchers and the Beatles' George Harrison. However, the success of the Byrds' debut created a template for folk rock that proved successful for many acts during the mid-1960s.

=== Conception ===
Most of the members of the Byrds had a background in folk music, since Jim McGuinn, Gene Clark, and David Crosby had all worked as folk singers during the early 1960s. They had all spent time, independently of each other, in various folk groups, including the New Christy Minstrels, the Limeliters, the Chad Mitchell Trio, and Les Baxter's Balladeers.

In early 1964, McGuinn, Clark, and Crosby formed the Jet Set and started developing a fusion of folk-based lyrics and melodies, with arrangements in the style of the Beatles. In August 1964, the band's manager Jim Dickson acquired an acetate disc of "Mr. Tambourine Man" from Dylan's publisher, featuring a performance by Dylan and Ramblin' Jack Elliott. Although the band members were initially unimpressed with the song, after McGuinn changed the time signature from Dylan's 2/4 configuration to 4/4 time, they began rehearsing and demoing it. In an attempt to make it sound more like the Beatles, the band and Dickson elected to give the song a full, electric rock band treatment, effectively creating the musical subgenre of folk rock. To further bolster the group's confidence in the song, Dickson invited Dylan to a band rehearsal at World Pacific Studios to hear their rendition. Dylan was impressed, enthusiastically commenting, "Wow, you can dance to that!" His endorsement erased any lingering doubts the band had about the song.

Mr. Tambourine Man (1964 demo)
An excerpt from a 1964 demo recording of "Mr. Tambourine Man" by the Byrds, highlighting Michael Clarke's martial, marching band-style drumming.

During this period, drummer Michael Clarke and bass player Chris Hillman joined, and the band changed their name to the Byrds over Thanksgiving 1964. Band biographer Johnny Rogan has remarked that the two surviving demos of "Mr. Tambourine Man" dating from this period feature an incongruous marching band drum part from Clarke, but overall the arrangement is very close to the later single version.

=== Production ===
The master take of "Mr. Tambourine Man" was recorded on January 20, 1965, at Columbia Studios in Hollywood, before the release of Dylan's own version. The song's jangling, melodic guitar playing (performed by McGuinn on a 12-string Rickenbacker guitar) was immediately influential and has remained so to the present day. The group's complex vocal harmony work, as featured on "Mr. Tambourine Man", became another major characteristic of their sound. Due to producer Terry Melcher's initial lack of confidence in the Byrds' musicianship, as a result of them not having gelled musically yet, McGuinn was the only Byrd to play on both "Mr. Tambourine Man" and its B-side, "I Knew I'd Want You". Rather than using band members, Melcher hired the Wrecking Crew, a collection of top L.A. session musicians (listed here), who (with McGuinn on guitar) provided the backing track over which McGuinn, Crosby, and Clark sang. By the time that sessions for their debut album began in March 1965, Melcher was satisfied that the band was competent enough to record its own musical backing. Much of the track's arrangement and final mixdown was modeled after Brian Wilson's production work for the Beach Boys' "Don't Worry Baby".

The Byrds' recording of the song opens with a distinctive, Bach-inspired guitar introduction played by McGuinn and then, like Dylan's version, goes into the song's chorus. Although Dylan's version contains four verses, the Byrds perform only the song's second verse and two repeats of the chorus, followed by a variation on the song's introduction, which then fades out. The Byrds' arrangement of the song had been shortened during the band's rehearsals, at the suggestion of Jim Dickson, in order to accommodate commercial radio stations, which were reluctant to play songs that were more than two-and-a-half minutes long. As a result, while Dylan's version is five-and-a-half minutes long, the Byrds' version runs just short of two-and-a-half minutes. The lead vocal on the Byrds' recording of "Mr. Tambourine Man" was sung by McGuinn, who attempted to modify his singing style to fill what he perceived as a gap in the popular music scene of the day, somewhere between the vocal sound of John Lennon and Bob Dylan. The song also took on a spiritual aspect for McGuinn during the recording sessions, as he told Rogan in 1997: "I was singing to God and I was saying that God was the Tambourine Man and I was saying to him, 'Hey, God, take me for a trip and I'll follow you.' It was a prayer of submission."

=== Reception ===
The single reached number 1 on the Billboard Hot 100, and number 1 on the UK Singles Chart, making it the first recording of a Dylan song to reach number 1 on any pop music chart. In 2009, the band's bassist Chris Hillman gave Bob Eubanks, a DJ on KRLA and later the host of The Newlywed Game, credit for originally breaking the song on the radio in L.A.

Upon release, Record World picked it as its "Sleeper of the Week" and called it a "funky and slow treatment of the Bob Dylan tune that has a lot to say. Moody and different treatment from a group going places." Band biographer Christopher Hjort has remarked that it is surprising that neither Billboard or Cashbox magazines reviewed the single, considering the efforts Columbia put into promoting the record. In the UK, Record Mirror described the single as, "A Bob Dylan song of uncommon charm. Group is American, folksy and five-strong. Busy mandolin-style [sic] backing. Song is the big selling point, for sure." In his review for Music Echo, critic Brian Harvey described it as "a folksy, guitar twangy, medium tempo swinger. It's a busy number with lots of echo. Lead voice tells the story and has vocal group backing in the attractive chorus. The melody sticks even after one play."

Critic William Ruhlmann has argued that in the wake of "Mr. Tambourine Man", the influence of the Byrds could be heard in recordings by a number of other Los Angeles-based acts, including the Turtles, the Leaves, Barry McGuire, and Sonny & Cher. In addition, author and music historian Richie Unterberger sees the influence of the Byrds in recordings by the Lovin' Spoonful, the Mamas & the Papas, Simon & Garfunkel, and Love, while author John Einarson has said that both the Grass Roots and We Five enjoyed commercial success by emulating the Byrds' folk rock sound. Unterberger also feels that, by late 1965, the Beatles were assimilating the sound of the Byrds into their Rubber Soul album, most notably on the songs "Nowhere Man" and "If I Needed Someone". Both Unterberger and author Peter Lavezzoli have commented that Dylan himself decided to record with electric instrumentation on his 1965 album Bringing It All Back Home in part due to the influence of the Byrds' rock adaptation of "Mr. Tambourine Man".

As the 1960s came to a close, folk rock changed and evolved away from the jangly template pioneered by the Byrds, but, Unterberger argues, the band's influence could still be heard in the music of Fairport Convention. Since the 1960s, the Byrds' jangly, folk rock sound has continued to influence popular music, with authors such as Chris Smith, Johnny Rogan, and Mark Deming, noting the band's influence on various acts including Big Star, Tom Petty and the Heartbreakers, R.E.M., the Long Ryders, the Smiths, the Bangles, the Stone Roses, Teenage Fanclub, and the La's.

In addition to appearing on the Byrds' debut album, "Mr. Tambourine Man" is included on several Byrds' compilation and live albums, including The Byrds Greatest Hits, Live at Royal Albert Hall 1971, The Very Best of The Byrds, The Essential Byrds, The Byrds Play Dylan, and the live disc of The Byrds' (Untitled) album. The Byrds' version of the song appears on compilation albums that include hit songs by multiple artists. Two earlier demo recordings of "Mr. Tambourine Man", dating from the World Pacific rehearsal sessions, can be heard on the Byrds' archival albums Preflyte, In the Beginning, and The Preflyte Sessions.

=== Personnel ===
According to Christopher Hjort:

The Byrds

- Roger McGuinn – lead vocal, twelve-string electric guitar
- Gene Clark – harmony vocal
- David Crosby – harmony vocal

Additional musicians

- Hal Blaine – drums
- Jerry Cole – guitar
- Larry Knechtel – bass guitar
- Bill Pitman – guitar

Note

- On the final recording, Leon Russell's electric piano contribution was mixed out, and Hjort writes that Cole and Pitman's guitars are "barely audible". Jim Dickson, the Byrds' manager, suggests that Clark's harmony vocal was mixed out and is only faintly audible due to bleed.

== Charts ==
=== Weekly charts ===
Weekly chart performance for the Byrds' cover
Chart (1965)	Peak position
Canada RPM Top Singles	2
Ireland (IRMA)	1
Finland (Soumen Virallinen)	10
South Africa (Springbok Radio)	1
UK (Record Retailer)	1
US Billboard Hot 100	1
US Cash Box Top 100	1
New Zealand	1
Australia	4

=== Year-end charts ===
Year-end chart performance for the Byrds' cover
Chart (1965)	Rank
South Africa	14
US Billboard Hot 100	25
US Cash Box	26

== Certifications ==
Certifications and sales for "Mr. Tambourine Man"
Region	Certification	Certified units/sales
New Zealand (RMNZ) Bob Dylan version	Gold	15,000^{‡}
United Kingdom (BPI) Bob Dylan version	Silver	200,000^{‡}
United Kingdom (BPI) The Byrds version	Silver	200,000^{‡}
^{‡} Sales+streaming figures based on certification alone.

== Other recordings ==
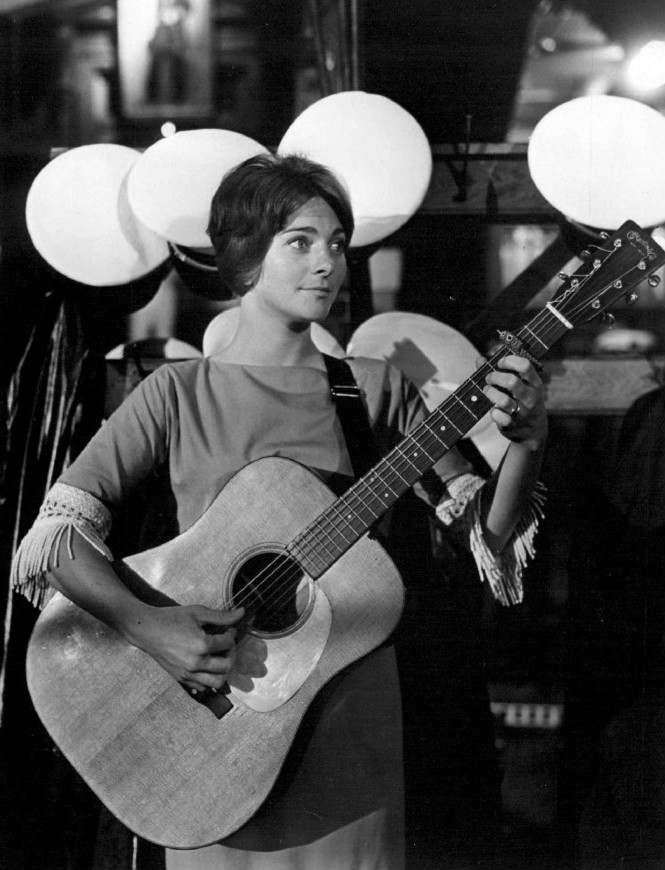
Pictured in 1963, folk singer Judy Collins covered "Mr. Tambourine Man" in 1965.

"Mr. Tambourine Man" has been performed and recorded by many artists and in different languages over the years, including at least thirteen versions recorded in 1965 alone. The Brothers Four recorded a commercial version before the Byrds, but were unable to release it due to licensing issues. Odetta included her version of the song on her album Odetta Sings Dylan, released early March 1965. Notable recordings of the song have been made by Judy Collins, Stevie Wonder, the Four Seasons, the Barbarians, and Chad and Jeremy. Other artists who have recorded the song include Alvin and the Chipmunks (1965), Glen Campbell (1965), the Beau Brummels (1966), the Lettermen (1966), Kenny Rankin (1967), Melanie (1968), Joni Mitchell (1970), Gene Clark (1984) and Crowded House (1989). William Shatner recorded a spoken-word cover of the song for his 1968 album The Transformed Man.

A reunited line-up of the Byrds, featuring Roger McGuinn, Chris Hillman, and David Crosby, performed "Mr. Tambourine Man" with Dylan at a Roy Orbison tribute concert on February 24, 1990. This live performance of the song was included on the 1990 box set The Byrds. At the October 1992 Bob Dylan 30th anniversary tribute concert at Madison Square Garden, McGuinn performed the song, backed by Tom Petty, Mike Campbell, and Benmont Tench, among others.

Timothée Chalamet sings it in the Dylan biopic A Complete Unknown.

== Legacy ==
The Byrds' version of "Mr. Tambourine Man" was listed as the number 79 song on Rolling Stone's 2004 list of the 500 Greatest Songs of All Time, and Dylan's version was ranked number 106. It is one of three songs to place twice, along with "Walk This Way" by both Aerosmith and Run-DMC with Perry and Tyler, and "Blue Suede Shoes" by both Carl Perkins and Elvis Presley. The Byrds' version was honored with a Grammy Hall of Fame Award in 1998, and Dylan's version was honored with the same award in 2002.

In 1989 Rolling Stone ranked the Byrds' version of "Mr. Tambourine Man" as the number 86 single of the prior 25 years. That same year, music critic Dave Marsh listed it as number 207 in his list of the top 1001 singles ever made. In 1999, National Public Radio in the United States listed this version as one of the 300 most important American records of the 20th century. In the UK, music critic Colin Larkin listed the Byrds' version as the number 1 single of all time. Other UK publishers that have listed this song as one of the top songs or singles include Mojo, New Musical Express, and Sounds. Australian music critic Toby Creswell included the song in his book 1001 Songs: The Great Songs of All Time and the Artists, Stories and Secrets Behind Them.

In a 2005 readers' poll reported in Mojo, Dylan's version of "Mr. Tambourine Man" was listed as the number four all-time greatest Bob Dylan song, and a similar poll of artists ranked the song number 14. In 2002, Uncut listed it as the number 15 all-time Dylan song.

In June 2026, CBS News included the song in its list of the 250 essential American songs of the past 250 years.

== Sources ==
Books:

- Creswell, Toby (2006), 1001 Songs: The Great Songs of All Time and the Artists, Stories and Secrets Behind Them, Da Capo Press, ISBN 1-56025-915-9
- Dettmar, Kevin J. H., ed. (2009), The Cambridge Companion to Bob Dylan (Cambridge Companions to American Studies), Cambridge University Press, ISBN 978-0-521-71494-5
- Dylan, Bob (2006), Lyrics: 1962-2001, Simon & Schuster, ISBN 0-7432-3101-5
- Eder, Bruce (1990). The Byrds 1990 CD box set liner notes.
- Egan, Sean (2011), The Mammoth Book of Bob Dylan, Hachette UK
- Einarson, John (2005), Mr. Tambourine Man: The Life and Legacy of the Byrds' Gene Clark, Backbeat Books, ISBN 0-87930-793-5
- Gill, Andy (1998), Don't Think Twice, It's All Right: Bob Dylan, the Early Years, Da Capo Press, ISBN 1-56025-185-9
- Hartman, Kent (2012), The Wrecking Crew: The Inside Story of Rock and Roll's Best-Kept Secret, Macmillan
- Heylin, Clinton (1995), Bob Dylan: The Recording Sessions (1960–1994), St. Martin's Griffin, ISBN 0-312-15067-9
- Heylin, Clinton (2002), Bob Dylan: Behind the Shades, Harper Collins, ISBN 0-06-052569-X
- Heylin, Clinton (2009), Revolution in the Air, Chicago Review Press, ISBN 978-1-55652-843-9
- Hinchey, John (2002), Like a Complete Unknown, Stealing Home Press, ISBN 0-9723592-0-6
- Hjort, Christopher (2008), So You Want To Be A Rock 'n' Roll Star: The Byrds Day-By-Day (1965-1973), Jawbone Press, ISBN 978-1-906002-15-2
- Larkin, Colin (2000), Virgin All-time Top 1000 Albums, Virgin Books
- Lavezzoli, Peter (2006), The Dawn of Indian Music in the West, A&C Black
- Marsh, Dave (1999), The Heart of Rock & Soul: The 1001 Greatest Singles Ever Made, Da Capo Press, ISBN 0-306-80901-X
- Rogan, Johnny (1996). Turn! Turn! Turn! (Reissue CD liner notes). Gene Clark. Edsel Records. ED CD 198.
- Rogan, Johnny (1998), The Byrds: Timeless Flight Revisited (2nd ed.), Rogan House, ISBN 095295401X
- Rogovoy, Seth (2009), Bob Dylan: Prophet, Mystic, Poet, Scribner, ISBN 978-1-4165-5915-3
- Santelli, Robert (2005), The Bob Dylan Scrapbook: 1956–1966, Simon & Schuster, ISBN 0-7432-2828-6
- Shelton, Robert (1997), No Direction Home, Da Capo Press, ISBN 0-306-80782-3
- Smith, Chris (2009), 101 Albums That Changed Popular Music, Oxford University Press, ISBN 978-0-19-537371-4
- Sounes, Howard (2001), Down the Highway: The Life Of Bob Dylan, Doubleday, ISBN 0-552-99929-6
- Trager, Oliver (2004), Keys to the Rain: The Definitive Bob Dylan Encyclopedia, Billboard Books, ISBN 0-8230-7974-0
- Unterberger, Richie (2002), Turn! Turn! Turn!: The '60s Folk-Rock Revolution, Backbeat Books, ISBN 0-87930-703-X
- Varesi, Anthony (2002), The Bob Dylan Albums, Guernica, ISBN 1-55071-139-3
- Wadhams, Wayne (2001), Inside the Hits: The Seduction of a Rock and Roll Generation, Berklee Press, ISBN 0-634-01430-7
- Warwick, Neil, Jon Kutner and Tony Brown (2004), The Complete Book of the British Charts (3rd ed.), Omnibus Press, p. 6, ISBN 1-84449-058-0
- Williams, Paul (1990), Bob Dylan Performing Artist: The Early Years 1960–1973, Underwood-Miller, ISBN 0-88733-131-9
- Williamson, Nigel (2006), The Rough Guide to Bob Dylan 2, Rough Guides, ISBN 1-84353-718-4

Liner notes:

- Fricke, David (1996). Mr. Tambourine Man - Columbia CD Reissue (Media notes).
- Fricke, David (2001). Mr. Tambourine Man - Sundazed CD Reissue (Media notes).

Websites:

- "1962-66: American Folk-Rock vs. The British Invasion" (PDF). State University of New York at Oswego. Archived from the original (PDF) on June 11, 2011.
- "The Byrds: Billboard Singles". AllMusic.com.
- "David Crosby". Crosbycpr.com. Archived from the original on June 4, 2010.
- Deming, Mark. "The Other Side of the Mirror". AllMusic.
- Deming, Mark. "10-5-60". AllMusic.
- Eder, Bruce. "George Harrison". AllMusic.
- Erlewine, Stephen Thomas. "Bob Dylan at Budokan". AllMusic.
- Erlewine, Stephen Thomas. "Bob Dylan's Greatest Hits". AllMusic.
- Erlewine, Stephen Thomas. "Bootleg Series, Vol. 5: Bob Dylan Live 1975 – The Rolling Thunder Revue". AllMusic.
- "Folk-Rock". AllMusic. Archived from the original on May 20, 2012.
- Gilliland, John (1969). "Revolt of the Fat Angel: American musicians respond to the British invaders" (audio). Pop Chronicles. University of North Texas Libraries.
- Ginell, Richard. "The Concert for Bangladesh". AllMusic.
- "Grammy Hall of Fame Award". Grammy.com. Archived from the original on July 12, 2009.
- McGuinn, Roger. "Byrds FAQ List: What songs did the Byrds make popular?". Ibiblio.org.
- Mellers, Wilfrid (1984), A Darker Shade of Pale, Oxford University Press, ISBN 0-19-503622-0
- "Mojo: 100 Greatest Dylan Songs". Rock List Music.
- "Mojo: The 100 Greatest Singles of All Time". Rock List Music.
- "Mr. Tambourine Man". ByrdWatcher: A Field Guide to The Byrds of Los Angeles. Archived from the original on January 11, 2010.
- "Mr. Tambourine Man: The Byrds". AllMusic.
- "Musicians Associated With The Byrds: The New Christy Minstrels". ByrdWatcher: A Field Guide to the Byrds of Los Angeles. Archived from the original on October 28, 2010.
- "NME's 100 Greatest Singles of All Time". Rock List Music.
- "The Original NPR 300". National Public Radio.
- "The Rolling Stone 500 Greatest Songs of All Time". Rock List Music.
- "Rolling Stone: The 100 Best Singles of the Last 25 Years". Rock List Music. Archived from the original on February 11, 2006.
- Ruhlmann, William. "Mr. Tambourine Man: Bob Dylan". AllMusic.
- Russel, Richard E. "Roger McGuinn: Founder of The Byrds". Ibiblio.org.
- "Sounds All Time Top 100 Albums & Singles". Rock List Music.
- Sutton, Mike. "No Direction Home: Bob Dylan". DVDTimes.co.uk.
- "Uncut: Top 40 Dylan Tracks". Rock List Music. Archived from the original on February 9, 2006.
- Unterberger, Richie. "The Bootleg Series, Vol. 4: The "Royal Albert Hall" Concert". AllMusic.
- Unterberger, Richie. "Bruce Langhorne (1)". Richieunterberger.com.
- Unterberger, Richie. "Bruce Langhorne (2)". Richieunterberger.com.
- Unterberger, Richie. "The Byrds". AllMusic.
- Unterberger, Richie. "Fairport Convention". AllMusic.
- Unterberger, Richie. "Folk Rock: An Overview". Richieunterberger.com.
- Unterberger, Richie. "Love". AllMusic.
- Unterberger, Richie. "Rubber Soul". AllMusic.
- "The Witmark Demos". AllMusic.com.
