= Idris Davies =

Welsh poet

- Born: 6 January 1905; Rhymney, near Merthyr Tydfil, Wales
- Died: 6 April 1953 (aged 48); Rhymney, near Merthyr Tydfil, Wales
- Occupation: Poet

Idris Davies (6 January 1905 – 6 April 1953) was a Welsh poet. He was born in Rhymney, in the historic county of Monmouthshire in South East Wales to Welsh-speaking parents, Evan Davies and his wife Elizabeth Ann. He and his young sister Dorothy (Doris) learnt English in the local school. He left school at the age of fourteen and for the next seven years worked underground as a coal miner in a nearby pit. In 1925, he began to attend local evening classes. In the following year the 1926 United Kingdom general strike occurred, after which he became unemployed for four years. Davies returned to education in 1929 when he became a pupil-teacher. In the following year he enrolled in a teacher training course at Loughborough College in Leicestershire, England. From 1932 to 1947 he worked as a teacher in London. Later in 1947, he returned to the Rhymney Valley to teach at a junior school in New Tredegar. He taught there until 1951, when his abdominal cancer prevented him continuing. He died in 1953.

Davies first became interested in poetry in 1925 when he was attending evening classes. He subsequently had published four books of his poems, which he began to write while he was in London. His first book, Gwalia deserta (in English "Wasteland of Wales") was published in 1938. This was followed in 1943 by The angry summer, which had the sub-title A poem of 1926. In 1945 he had published Tonypandy and other poems, an anthology of his poems which were chosen by T. S. Eliot. Finally, shortly before his death, Selected poems was published.

Davies was the only poet to cover the significant political events of the early 20th century in the South Wales Valleys and the South Wales Coalfield, which was informed from his experience of having worked at the coalface. He is best known for the verses "The Bells of Rhymney" from his 1938 Gwalia Deserta, which were adapted by several famous singers into a popular folk song.

== Early life and education ==
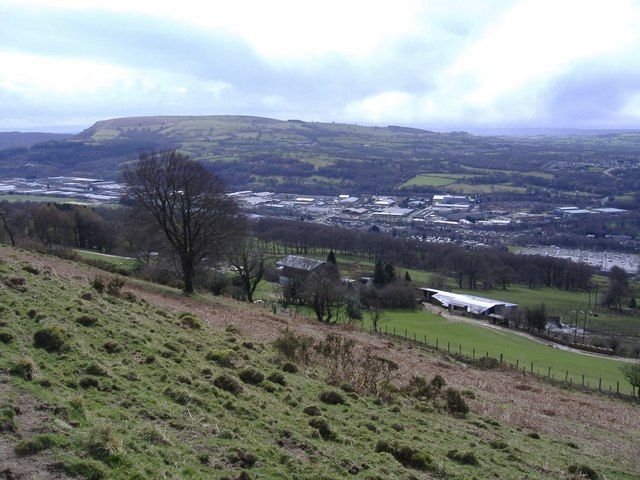
The Rhymney Valley in South Wales

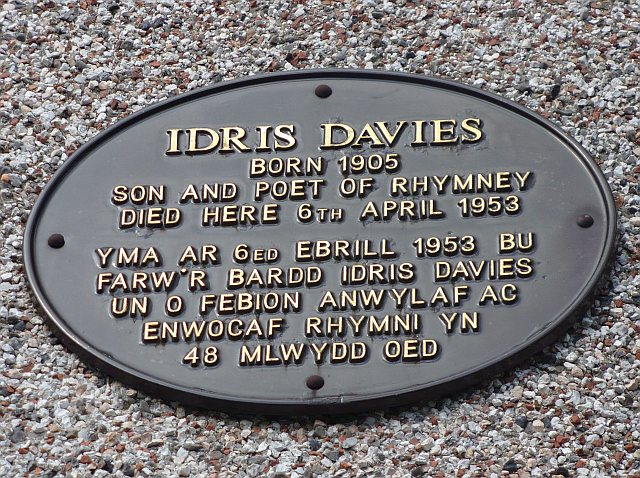
Memorial plaque (in English and Welsh), Victoria Road, Rhymney

Davies was born at 16 Field Street, Rhymney, Monmouthshire, the son of Welsh-speaking parents, son of Evan Davies, colliery chief winderman (mine lift operator) Evan Davies and his wife Elizabeth Ann. He learned English at school; like all Monmouthshire children, he became systematically anglicised. After leaving school at the age of fourteen, for the next seven years Davies worked underground as a miner in the nearby McLaren Pit at Abertysswg and later at the Maerdy Pit in Pontlottyn. In 1925 he had an accident underground, because of which he lost a little finger. In the following year the 1926 United Kingdom general strike occurred, after which he became unemployed for four years. In the autumn of 1925, Davies enrolled in evening classes. Initially he enrolled in continuation classes in English, arithmetic, drawing and science. Then he enrolled in commercial classes in English and bookkeeping, the latter for a Royal Society of Arts examination, which he passed at elementary level. Finally he enrolled in another set of evening classes in arithmetic and English grammar, during which he became interested in English literature, in particular the Romantics. He rejected Welsh literature outright because of his accusation of what 'the parsons', as he called them, had done to it.

At the time, interest in the Labour Party was at 'white heat'. Consequently, Davies became extremely interested in politics, attending a series of weekly lectures in the local Workmen's Library on the application of Marxism to recent economic history which was taught by a graduate of Ruskin College, Oxford. As elsewhere, the political temperature in Rhymney rose considerably in the winter of 1925. However, before the year was out Davies experienced a serious accident underground, his second accident, as a result of which he lost a little finger. In the following year the much-vaunted General Strike of 1926 occurred, the local pit closed and he became unemployed. He spent the next four years following what he called 'the long and lonely self-tuition game'.

== Teaching career ==
In 1929, having passed the Oxford Local Examination at his second attempt, Davies became a pupil-teacher, an honorary post, in his old school, working with his old headmaster. The following year a new teacher training course started at Loughborough College. He enrolled in the September with handicraft as his main subject. However, it became clear that he didn't have any aptitude for handicraft. Consequently, it was decided that he should also enrol on a course in advanced English literature that was held two days a week at the nearby University of Nottingham and that he should not have one main subject, but two, English and History. He passed the course at advanced level and qualified as a teacher in August 1932.

Davies started teaching in that year in Laysterne Junior Mixed Primary School in Hoxton in Hackney, London during which he became friends with Dylan Thomas. Also he became acquainted with a group of Welsh litterateurs who frequented Griff's Bookshop, a Welsh bookshop in Cecil Court, off Charing Cross Road, which was kept by the Griffiths brothers.

After the end of the Second World War, Davies was transferred to Wordsworth School (possibly Stoke Newington, London). However, he had become nostalgic for Wales. Consequently, in 1947, with the help of a local councillor, he returned to the Rhymney Valley to teach at the junior school in Cwmsyfiog Schools, New Tredegar. He taught there until 1951 when his abdominal cancer prevented him from continuing. He died, aged 48, at his mother's house at 7, Victoria Road, Rhymney on Easter Monday, 6 April 1953 and was buried in Rhymney Public Cemetery.

== Poetry ==
Davies was introduced to poetry in the autumn of 1925, after having enrolled in a set of evening classes in arithmetic and English grammar, after which, at the behest of the teacher, he bought a book of poetry by Keats. Then, in the spring, he read Shelley, to whom a friend had introduced him and borrowed a book of poems from him to read, which he followed by reading Wordsworth.

Davies' initial work appeared in the Western Mail, the Merthyr Express, the Daily Herald, the Left Review and Comment (a weekly periodical of poetry, criticism and short stories, edited by Victor Neuburg and Sheila Macleod). They were followed in 1938 with his first book, Gwalia Deserta. His next book, The angry summer, which had the subtitle 'A poem of 1926', was published in 1943. Shortly afterwards in 1945, Tonypandy and other poems was published. Davies had his fourth book, an anthology of poems, published (by Faber & Faber) in 1945, the poems having been chosen by T. S. Eliot. Eliot thought that Davies' poems had a claim to permanence, describing them as "the best poetic document I know about a particular epoch in a particular place".

Davies' final volume, Selected Poems, was published shortly before his death. Around this time Dylan Thomas wrote him a surprisingly touching letter. Thomas had read "Bells of Rhymney" as part of a Saint David's Day radio broadcast, but told Davies that he did not feel the poem was particularly representative of Davies' work, as it was "not angry enough".

After Davies' death over two hundred of his manuscript poems and a short verse-play, together with the typescripts of his comprehensive wartime diaries, were deposited at the National Library of Wales at Aberystwyth. Later, more of his unpublished poems and most of his prose – an unfinished novel, essays, lecture notes and some of his letters – were found. Some of this later material appeared posthumously in The Collected Poems of Idris Davies (1972); Idris Davies (1972), and Argo Record No. ZPL.1181: Idris Davies (1972).

Much of Davies' work has been reprinted. The Collected poems of Idris Davies was published in 1980. Gwalia Deserta was reprinted in 1993. The Complete poems of Idris Davies was published in 1994. And A carol for the coalfield and other poems was published in 2002.

== Recognition ==
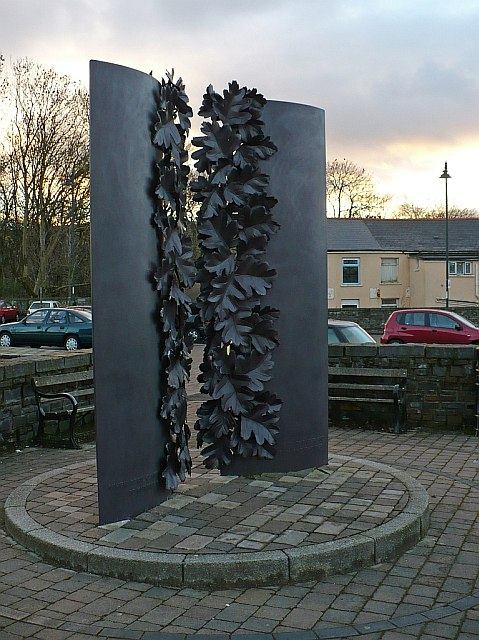
Memorial to Idris Davies in Rhymney, Monmouthshire, Wales

There are memorial plaques to Davies at Victoria Road and at the town library.

There is a modern memorial sculpture for Davies in Rhymney, with an inscription reading "When April came to Rhymney with shower and sun and shower" – the opening line of his poem "Rhymney".

In 1981 a special issue (16/4) of Poetry Wales was issued in commemoration of Davies. Jones (2001) documented that it:

Contains fifteen previously uncollected poems and extracts from the poet’s diaries and includes, among other essays, Richard Poole, ‘Idris Davies: The Bitter Dreamer’; John Pikoulis, ‘The Watcher on the Mountain: The Poetry of Idris Davies’; Ioan Williams, ‘Two Welsh Poets: James Kitchener Davies (1902–52); Idris Davies (1905–53)’; Tony Bianchi, ‘Idris Davies and the Politics of Anger’.

In September 2006 a refurbished grave memorial was unveiled at a re-dedication service in the town's cemetery. Davies was recognised at two events in Wales in 2008, at the Twentieth Annual Conference of the Association for Welsh writing in English and the postgraduate symposium Reappraising Welsh Welsh moderism. Jones (2011) revised the material which was delivered at the events.

== Views ==
Gwalia Deserta XXXVI

In the places of my boyhood
The pit-wheels turn no more,
Nor any furnace lightens
The midnight as of yore.

The slopes of slag and cinder
Are sulking on the rain,
And in derelict valleys
The hope of youth is slain.

And yet I love to wander
The early ways I went,
And watch from doors and bridges
The hills and skies of Gwent.

Though blighted be the valleys
Where man meets man with pain,
The things by boyhood cherished
Stand firm, and shall remain.

— from Gwalia Deserta (1938)

The frontispiece of Gwalia Deserta provides a useful summary of Davies' outlook:

The author of this lyrical sequence is moved by a fine indignation born of experience. His poem, therefore, is the outcry of a community as well as that of an individual. It expresses the hopes, betrayal, and suffering of the people of South Wales. It has the simplicity of folksong, of a modern folksong rich with the idiom and image of the contemporary scene and outlook on life. These songs ring true and their appeal is more than a literary one. The author takes his place with Welsh poets such as W. H. Davies and Huw Menai as one authorised by his people to sing for them, and to show the world in music what they have suffered and are still suffering in actuality.

In 1939 Davies wrote in his diary: "I am a socialist. That is why I want as much beauty as possible in our everyday lives, and so I am an enemy of pseudo-poetry and pseudo-art of all kinds. Too many 'poets of the Left', as they call themselves, are badly in need of instruction as to the difference between poetry and propaganda ... These people should read William Blake on Imagination until they show signs of understanding him. Then the air will be clear again, and the land be, if not full of, fit for song."

== Work ==
Davies' first published volume was the 1938 extended poetical work Gwalia Deserta. The verses it contained were inspired partly by such mining disasters as that at Marine Colliery at Cwm near Ebbw Vale in 1927, and by the failure of the 1926 UK General Strike, the Great Depression in the United Kingdom and their combined effects on the South Wales valleys.

The "Bells of Rhymney" verses, perhaps Davies' most widely known work, appear as Part XV of the book. The stanzas follow the pattern of the well known nursery rhyme "Oranges and Lemons". In the late 1950s the verses were adapted into a folk song by Pete Seeger and became a folk rock standard. The song, entitled "The Bells of Rhymney", has been covered by many others since. More recently some of the other stanzas from Davies' Gwalia Deserta have also been set to music by Welsh performer Max Boyce as the song "When We Walked to Merthyr Tydfil in the Moonlight Long Ago".

In February 2010 Davies' work was mentioned, by Conservative MP David Davies and Plaid Cymru MP Hywel Williams, in a Parliamentary debate concerning the provision of healthcare in Wales. The 2017 album Every Valley, by London-based alternative band Public Service Broadcasting, includes a version of Gwalia Deserta XXXVI set to music and re-titled Turn No More. It is sung by Manic Street Preachers' singer James Dean Bradfield.

== See also ==
- Anglo-Welsh poetry
