= Ciro's =

Former nightclub in California, US

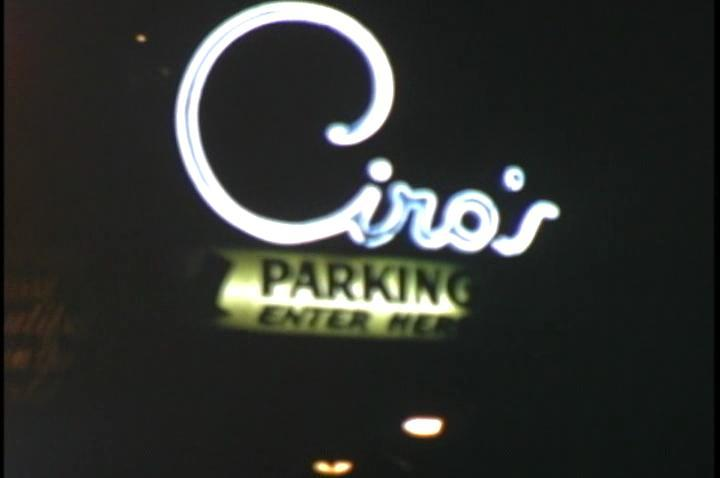
- Ciro's neon sign, 1955
- Interactive map of Ciro's
- Location: 8433 Sunset Boulevard; West Hollywood, California; United States
- Coordinates: 34.094990°N 118.373806°W
- Type: Nightclub

Construction
- Opened: 1940
- Closed: 1957

Ciro's (later known as Ciro's Le Disc) was a nightclub on Sunset Boulevard in West Hollywood, California, United States. Owned by William Wilkerson and opened in 1940, Ciro's became a popular nightspot for celebrities. The nightclub closed in 1960 and was reopened as a rock club in 1965. After a few name changes, it eventually became The Comedy Store in 1972.

== History ==
Club Seville opened New Year's Eve 1935. It featured a "crystal dance floor with subsurface fish, fountains and colored lights in its Crystal Marine Room."

The building was remodeled by Douglas Honnold, and, in January 1940, Ciro's was opened by entrepreneur William Wilkerson at 8433 Sunset Boulevard. In 1934, Wilkerson had also opened Cafe Trocadero, and the restaurant La Rue, both on the Strip, and would later originate The Flamingo in Las Vegas, only to have control of the resort wrested from him by mobster Benjamin "Bugsy" Siegel.

In November 1942, Wilkerson leased Ciro's to his longtime right-hand man Herman Hover, who would make sure Ciro's was an important Hollywood hotspot until 1959.

Ciro's combined a luxe baroque interior and an unadorned exterior and became a famous hangout for movie people of the 1940s and 1950s. It was one of the places to be seen and guaranteed being written about in the gossip columns of Hedda Hopper, Louella Parsons, and Florabel Muir. On April 8, 1947, Frank Sinatra slugged "one of the most abusive" Hearst gossip columnists, Lee Mortimer, outside Ciro's.

Among the galaxy of celebrities who frequented Ciro's were Marilyn Monroe, Humphrey Bogart and Lauren Bacall, Frank Sinatra, James Dean, Ava Gardner, Sidney Poitier, Anita Ekberg, Lucille Ball and Desi Arnaz, Spencer Tracy, Joan Crawford, Betty Grable, Marlene Dietrich, Clark Gable, Ginger Rogers, Ronald Reagan, Dean Martin, Jerry Lewis, Mickey Rooney, Cary Grant, George Raft, George Burns and Gracie Allen, Judy Garland, June Allyson and Dick Powell, Mamie Van Doren, Jimmy Stewart, Jack Benny, Peter Lawford, and Lana Turner (who often said Ciro's was her favorite nightspot) among many others. During his first visit to Hollywood in the late 1940s, future President John F. Kennedy dined at Ciro's.

In December 1951, Herman Hover, owner of Ciro's, was involved with the Lili St. Cyr's indecent exposure case. She was defended by Jerry Geisler. She was accompanied by Armando Orsini, her husband.

Herman Hover filed for bankruptcy in 1959, and Ciro's was sold at public auction for $350,000.

In 1965, Ciro's reopened as the rock club Ciro's Le Disc. Ike & Tina Turner performed at the newly opened club with Jimi Hendrix as part of their band. The Byrds got their start at Ciro's Le Disc on March 21, 1965. Accounts of the period (reproduced in the sleeve notes to The Preflyte Sessions box set) describe a "church-like" atmosphere, with interpretive dancing. The club also served as the host during the recording of the 1965 Dick Dale album Rock Out With Dick Dale & His Del-Tones: Live At Ciro's. Two years later, it was renamed The Kaleidoscope. In 1968, the club was called It's Boss. In 1969, it was known as Patch 2. The site of Ciro's became The Comedy Store in 1972.

== Notable performers ==
- The 5th Dimension
- The Andrews Sisters
- Ray Anthony
- Desi Arnaz
- Pearl Bailey
- Josephine Baker
- Dave Barry
- Len Barry
- Count Basie
- Shirley Bassey
- Louie Bellson
- Brook Benton
- Milton Berle
- Theresa Brewer
- Dave Brubeck
- Joyce Bryant
- George Burns
- The Byrds
- Eddie LeBaron
- Cab Calloway
- Canned Heat
- George Carlin
- Carmen Cavallaro
- Checkmates, Ltd.
- Lou Christie
- Petula Clark
- Rosemary Clooney
- Nat King Cole
- Dick Contino
- Xavier Cugat
- Dick Dale and the Del-Tones
- Dorothy Dandridge
- Billy Daniels
- Bobby Darin
- Sammy Davis Jr.
- Carmen de Lavallade
- The DeMarcos
- Marlene Dietrich
- Phyllis Diller
- The Doors
- Katherine Dunham
- Jimmy Durante
- Bob Dylan
- Barbara Eden
- Duke Ellington
- Eddie Fisher
- Ella Fitzgerald
- Connie Francis
- Slim Gaillard
- Judy Garland
- Marvin Gaye
- Benny Goodman
- Grateful Dead
- Mitzi Green
- Merv Griffin
- Buddy Hackett
- Phil Harris
- Dolores Hawkins
- Jimi Hendrix
- Hildegarde
- Billie Holiday
- Geoffrey Holder
- Libby Holman
- Lena Horne
- Burl Ives
- Joni James
- Jefferson Airplane
- Herb Jeffries
- Al Jolson
- Spike Jones
- Tom Jones
- Danny Kaye
- Stan Kenton
- The Kingsmen
- Lisa Kirk
- Eartha Kitt
- Abbe Lane
- Gypsy Rose Lee
- Peggy Lee
- Tom Lehrer
- Joe E. Lewis
- Liberace
- Little Richard
- Martin and Lewis
- Don Loper
- Love
- The Lovin' Spoonful
- Nellie Lutcher
- Rose Marie
- Freddy Martin
- Tony Martin and
  Cyd Charisse
- Al Martino
- Marilyn Maxwell
- Jimmy McHugh
- Liza Minnelli
- Carmen Miranda
- Guy Mitchell
- Jaye P. Morgan
- Patti Page
- Janis Paige
- Freda Payne
- The Peanut Butter Conspiracy
- Edith Piaf
- Charles Pierce
- Dorothy Provine
- Richard Pryor
- Arthur Prysock
- Tito Puente
- Carlos Ramírez
- Johnnie Ray
- Otis Redding
- Della Reese
- Harry Richman
- Don Rickles
- The Ritz Brothers
- Billy Joe Royal
- Andy Russell
- Jean Sablon
- Mort Sahl
- Lili St. Cyr
- Olga San Juan
- Hazel Scott
- Artie Shaw
- Roberta Sherwood
- Frank Sinatra
- Red Skelton
- Percy Sledge
- Sonny & Cher
- Danny Thomas
- Kay Thompson and
  The Williams Brothers
- Sophie Tucker
- Ike & Tina Turner
- Charles Trenet
- Mamie Van Doren
- Sarah Vaughan
- Veloz and Yolanda
- The Ventures
- Dionne Warwick
- Dinah Washington
- Senor Wences
- Mae West
- Josh White

== Ciro's club and restaurant chain ==
The name Ciro's comes from Italian-born Egyptian Ciro Capozzi who founded the first Ciro's bar in Monaco around 1892, next to the café Riche in the newly built Galerie Charles III. According to the story of James Gordon Bennett Jr., having a difference about a table on the terrasse, he bought the café Riche and gave it to Ciro who named it the Ciro's. In 1911, Ciro Capozzi sold the name to an English consortium (including William Poulett, 7th Earl Poulett as main investor, and Clément Hobson) who open the Deauville Ciro's (still existing as a restaurant belonging to the Groupe Lucien Barrière), the Paris Ciro's in 1912, and the London one in 1915. Ciro's became a European high society restaurant chain with branches in Monte Carlo, Paris, London (where Audrey Hepburn danced before her film career), and Deauville. Bartender Harry MacElhone, famous for Harry's New York Bar, first worked at Ciro's in London after World War I.

"Ciro's was a hip London establishment (before another popular one opened up in Los Angeles in 1940), that had as their bartender Harry McElhone (author of ABC of Cocktails), at which Jimmy took over when Harry went off to Paris. ..." (Ross Bolton)

"Louis Adlon, grandson of the proprietor of Berlin’s Hotel Adlon opened Hollywood’s first iteration of Ciro’s in 1934 (with Erich Alexander and George Sorel) Located on Hollywood Boulevard, the club was informally part of a chain with locations in London, Paris and Berlin. The Hollywood Ciro’s was not a success, apparently, because it soon folded."

"...At one point in the late 1930s there were wildcat Ciro's operating in Philadelphia, Chicago, Miami Beach (designed by George Farkas), Honolulu, Acapulco, Mexico City, and a host of other places..."
