= The Byrds (disambiguation) =

The Byrds were an American rock band, formed in Los Angeles, California in 1964. The term was also the name of several eponymous albums:

- The 1970 release, (Untitled)
- The 1973 album, titled simply Byrds (album)
- The 1990 box set, The Byrds (box set)

== See also ==
- Byrds albums
