= The Byrds =

American rock band

- David Crosby, Gene Clark, Michael Clarke, Chris Hillman, and Jim McGuinn (Note: Jim McGuinn changed his name to Roger McGuinn in 1967.) in 1965

Background information
- Origin: Los Angeles, California, U.S.
- Genres: Rock; folk rock; psychedelic rock; raga rock; country rock; jangle pop
- Years active: 1964–1973; 1989–1991; 2000
- Labels: Columbia; Asylum; Elektra
- Spinoffs: The Flying Burrito Brothers; Crosby, Stills, Nash & Young; Firefall; McGuinn, Clark & Hillman; the Desert Rose Band
- Past members: Roger McGuinn; Gene Clark; David Crosby; Michael Clarke; Chris Hillman; Kevin Kelley; Gram Parsons; Clarence White; Gene Parsons; John York; Skip Battin
- Website: thebyrds.com

The Byrds (/bɜːrdz/ BURDZ) were an American rock band formed in Los Angeles, California, in 1964. The band underwent multiple lineup changes, with frontman Roger McGuinn as the sole consistent member. For a short time in the mid-1960s, the Byrds were among the most popular groups in the world, with critics considering them to be among the most influential rock acts of their era. The band's signature sound of "angelic harmonies" and McGuinn's jangly 12-string Rickenbacker guitar sound was "absorbed into the vocabulary of rock" and has continued to be influential.

Initially, the Byrds pioneered the musical genre of folk rock as a popular format in 1965 by melding the influence of the Beatles and other British Invasion bands with contemporary and traditional folk music on their first and second albums and the hit singles "Turn! Turn! Turn!" and "Mr. Tambourine Man". As the 1960s progressed, the band was influential in originating psychedelic rock and raga rock, with their song "Eight Miles High" (1966) and the albums Fifth Dimension (1966), Younger Than Yesterday (1967), and The Notorious Byrd Brothers (1968). The band also helped pioneer country rock, particularly with the 1968 album Sweetheart of the Rodeo.

The band's original five-piece lineup consisted of McGuinn (lead guitar, vocals), Gene Clark (tambourine, vocals), David Crosby (rhythm guitar, vocals), Michael Clarke (drums), and Chris Hillman (bass guitar, vocals). In early 1966, Clark left due to anxiety and his increasing isolation within the group. The Byrds continued as a quartet until late 1967, when Crosby and Clarke departed. McGuinn and Hillman recruited new members, including country rock pioneer Gram Parsons, but by late 1968, Hillman and Parsons had also left the band. McGuinn rebuilt a new version of the Byrds that featured guitarist Clarence White among others. McGuinn disbanded that iteration of the band in early 1973 to make way for a reunion of the original quintet. The Byrds released their final album in March 1973, with the reunited group disbanding later that year.

Several members of the Byrds went on to successful careers as solo artists or as members of such groups as Crosby, Stills, Nash & Young, the Flying Burrito Brothers, McGuinn, Clark & Hillman, and the Desert Rose Band. In 1991, the Byrds were inducted into the Rock and Roll Hall of Fame in a ceremony that saw the five original members perform together for the last time. Gene Clark died of a heart attack later that year, while Michael Clarke died of liver failure in 1993. Crosby died in 2023. McGuinn and Hillman remain musically active.

== History ==
=== Formation (1964) ===
McGuinn and I started picking together in The Troubadour bar which was called The Folk Den at the time ... We went into the lobby and started picking on the stairway where the echo was good and David came walking up and just started singing away with us doing the harmony part ... We hadn't even approached him.

— Gene Clark recalling the encounter at the Troubadour folk club in Los Angeles that marked the genesis of the Byrds

The nucleus of the Byrds formed in early 1964, when Jim McGuinn, Gene Clark, and David Crosby came together as a trio. All three musicians had a background rooted in folk music, with each one having worked as a folk singer on the acoustic coffeehouse circuit during the early 1960s. In addition, they had all served time—independently of each other—as sidemen in various "collegiate folk" groups: McGuinn with the Limeliters and the Chad Mitchell Trio, Clark with the New Christy Minstrels, and Crosby with Les Baxter's Balladeers. McGuinn had also spent time as a professional songwriter at the Brill Building in New York City, under the tutelage of Bobby Darin. By early 1964, McGuinn had become enamored with the music of the Beatles, and had begun to intersperse his solo folk repertoire with acoustic versions of Beatles' songs. While performing at the Troubadour folk club in Los Angeles, McGuinn was approached by fellow Beatles fan Gene Clark, and the pair soon formed a Peter and Gordon-style duo, playing Beatles' covers, Beatlesque renditions of traditional folk songs, and some self-penned material. Soon after, David Crosby introduced himself to the duo at The Troubadour and began harmonizing with them on some of their songs. Impressed by the blend of their voices, the three musicians formed a trio and named themselves the Jet Set, a moniker inspired by McGuinn's love of aeronautics.

Crosby introduced McGuinn and Clark to his associate Jim Dickson, who had access to World Pacific Studios, where he had been recording demos of Crosby. Sensing the trio's potential, Dickson quickly took on management duties for the group, while his business partner, Eddie Tickner, became the group's accountant and financial manager. Dickson began utilizing World Pacific Studios to record the trio as they honed their craft and perfected their blend of Beatles pop and Bob Dylan-style folk. It was during the rehearsals at World Pacific that the band's folk rock sound—an amalgam of their own Beatles-influenced material, their folk music roots and their Beatlesque covers of contemporary folk songs—began to coalesce. Initially, this blend arose organically, but as rehearsals continued, the band began to actively attempt to bridge the gap between folk music and rock. Demo recordings made by the Jet Set at World Pacific Studios were later collected on the compilation albums Preflyte, In the Beginning, The Preflyte Sessions, and Preflyte Plus.

Drummer Michael Clarke joined the Jet Set in mid-1964. Clarke was recruited largely due to his good looks and Brian Jones-esque hairstyle, rather than for his musical experience, which was limited to having played congas in a semi-professional capacity in and around San Francisco and L.A. Clarke did not even own his own drum kit and initially had to play on a makeshift setup consisting of cardboard boxes and a tambourine. As the band continued to rehearse, Dickson arranged a one-off single deal for the group with Elektra Records' founder Jac Holzman. The single, which coupled the band originals "Please Let Me Love You" and "Don't Be Long", featured McGuinn, Clark, and Crosby, augmented by session musicians Ray Pohlman on bass and Earl Palmer on drums. In an attempt to cash in on the British Invasion craze that was dominating the American charts at the time, the band's name was changed for the single release to the suitably British-sounding the Beefeaters. "Please Let Me Love You" was issued by Elektra Records on October 7, 1964, but it failed to chart.

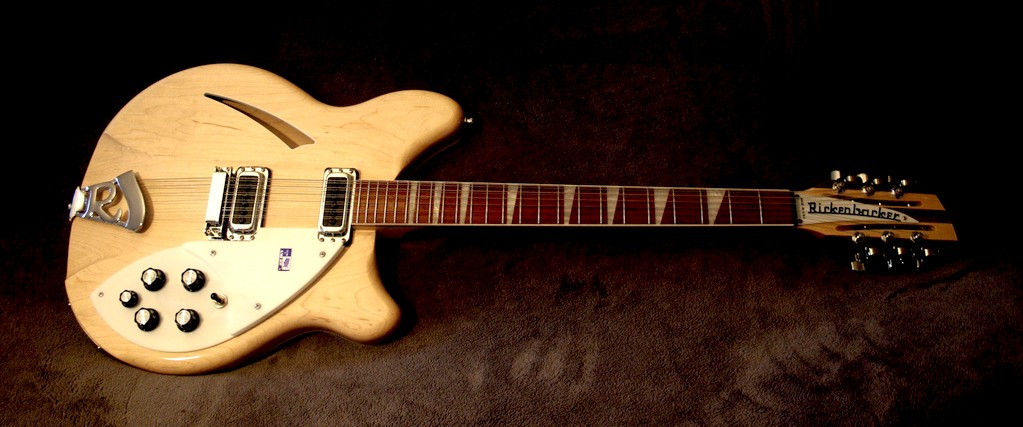
A Rickenbacker 360 12-string guitar similar to the one used by Jim McGuinn in 1964 and 1965. By 1966, McGuinn had transitioned to playing the three pickup 370/12 model.

In August 1964, Dickson managed to acquire an acetate disc of the then-unreleased Bob Dylan song "Mr. Tambourine Man", which he felt would make an effective cover for the Jet Set. Although the band was initially unimpressed with the song, they began rehearsing it with a rock band arrangement, changing the time signature from 2/4 to a rockier 4/4 configuration in the process. In an attempt to bolster the group's confidence in the song, Dickson invited Dylan himself to World Pacific to hear the band perform "Mr. Tambourine Man". Impressed by the group's rendition, Dylan enthusiastically commented, "Wow, man! You can dance to that!" His ringing endorsement erased any lingering doubts that the band had over the song's suitability.

Soon after, inspired by the Beatles' film A Hard Day's Night, the band decided to equip themselves with similar instruments to the Fab Four: a Rickenbacker twelve-string guitar for McGuinn, a Ludwig drum kit for Clarke, and a Gretsch Tennessean guitar for Clark (although Crosby commandeered it soon after, resulting in Clark switching to tambourine). In October 1964, Dickson recruited mandolin player Chris Hillman as the Jet Set's bassist. Hillman's background was more oriented towards country music than folk or rock, having been a member of the bluegrass groups the Scottsville Squirrel Barkers, the Hillmen (also known as the Golden State Boys), and, concurrently with his recruitment into the Jet Set, the Green Grass Group.

Through connections that Dickson had with impresario Benny Shapiro, and with a helpful recommendation from jazz trumpeter Miles Davis, the group signed a recording contract with Columbia Records on November 10, 1964. Two weeks later, during a Thanksgiving dinner at Tickner's house, the Jet Set decided to rename themselves as the Byrds, a moniker that retained the theme of flight and also echoed the deliberate misspelling of the Beatles.

=== Folk rock (1965) ===
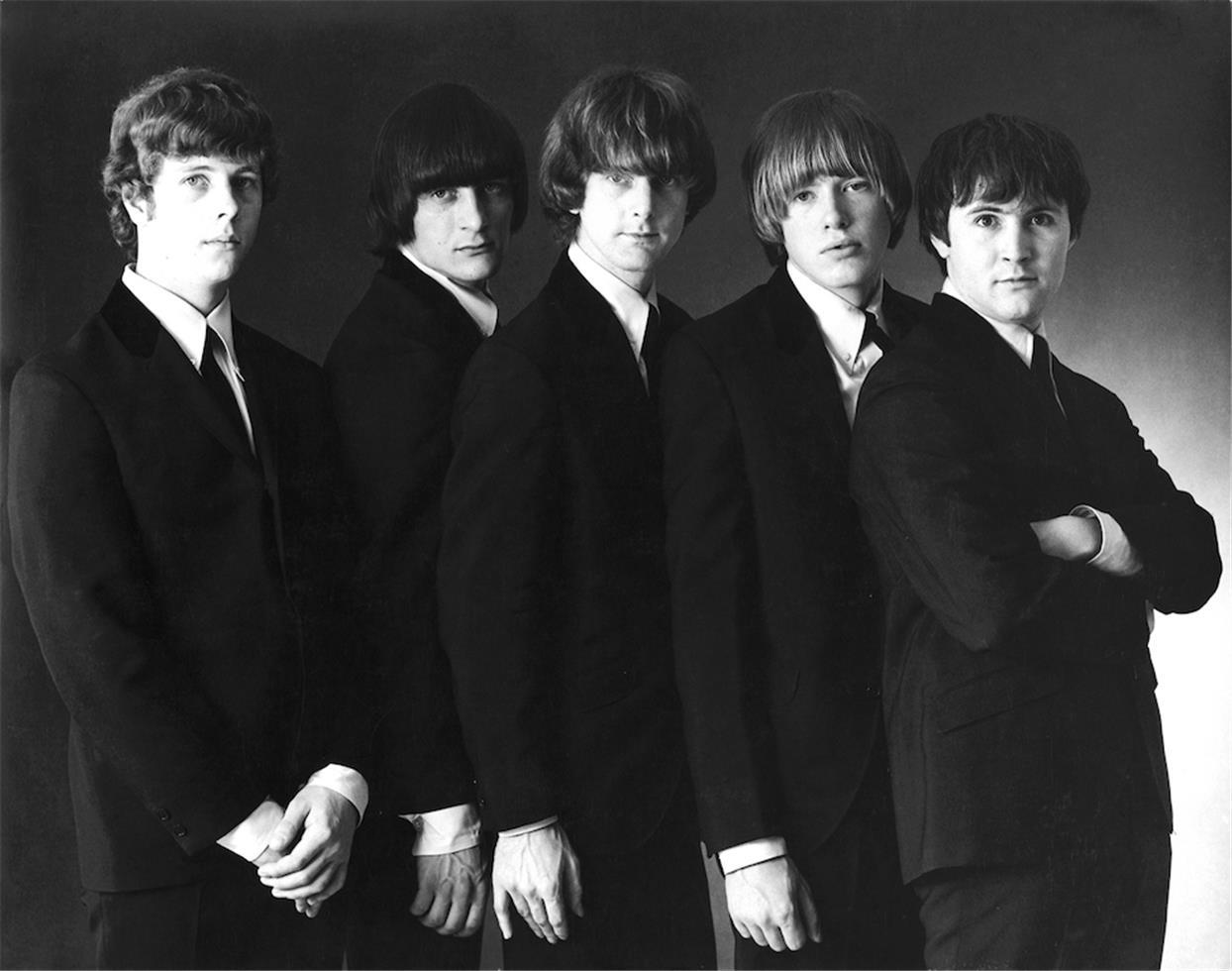
Promotional photo of the Byrds in early 1965, L to R: Chris Hillman, Gene Clark, Jim (later Roger) McGuinn, Michael Clarke, David Crosby

On January 20, 1965, the Byrds entered Columbia Studios in Hollywood to record "Mr. Tambourine Man" for release as their debut single on Columbia. Since the band had not yet completely gelled musically, McGuinn was the only Byrd to play on "Mr. Tambourine Man" and its Clark-penned B-side, "I Knew I'd Want You". Rather than using band members, producer Terry Melcher hired a collection of top session musicians, retroactively known as the Wrecking Crew, including Hal Blaine (drums), Larry Knechtel (bass), Jerry Cole (guitar), Bill Pitman (guitar), and Leon Russell (electric piano), who (along with McGuinn on guitar) provided the instrumental backing track over which McGuinn, Crosby and Clark sang. By the time the sessions for their debut album began in March 1965, Melcher was satisfied that the band was competent enough to record its own musical backing. The use of outside musicians on the Byrds' debut single has given rise to the persistent misconception that all of the playing on their debut album was done by session musicians.

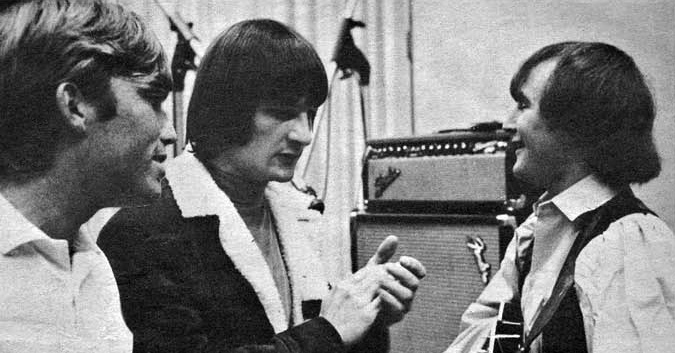
Producer Terry Melcher (left) in the recording studio with Gene Clark (center) and David Crosby (right). Melcher brought in session musicians to play on the "Mr. Tambourine Man" single because he felt that the Byrds hadn't yet gelled musically.

On March 21, 1965, while the band waited for "Mr. Tambourine Man" to be released, they began a residency at Ciro's Le Disc nightclub on the Sunset Strip in Hollywood. The band's regular appearances at Ciro's in March and April allowed them to hone their ensemble playing, perfect their aloof stage persona, and expand their repertoire. It was during their residency at the nightclub that the band first began to accrue a dedicated following among L.A.'s youth culture and hip Hollywood fraternity, with scenesters like Kim Fowley, Peter Fonda, Jack Nicholson, Arthur Lee, and Sonny & Cher regularly attending the band's performances. On March 26, the author of the band's forthcoming debut single, Bob Dylan, made an impromptu visit to the club and joined the Byrds on stage for a rendition of Jimmy Reed's "Baby What You Want Me to Do". The excitement generated by the Byrds at Ciro's quickly made them a must-see fixture on L.A.'s nightclub scene and resulted in hordes of teenagers filling the sidewalks outside the club, desperate to see the band perform. A number of noted music historians and authors, including Richie Unterberger, Ric Menck, and Peter Buckley, have suggested that the crowds of young Bohemians and hipsters that gathered at Ciro's to see the Byrds perform represented the first stirrings of the West Coast hippie counterculture.

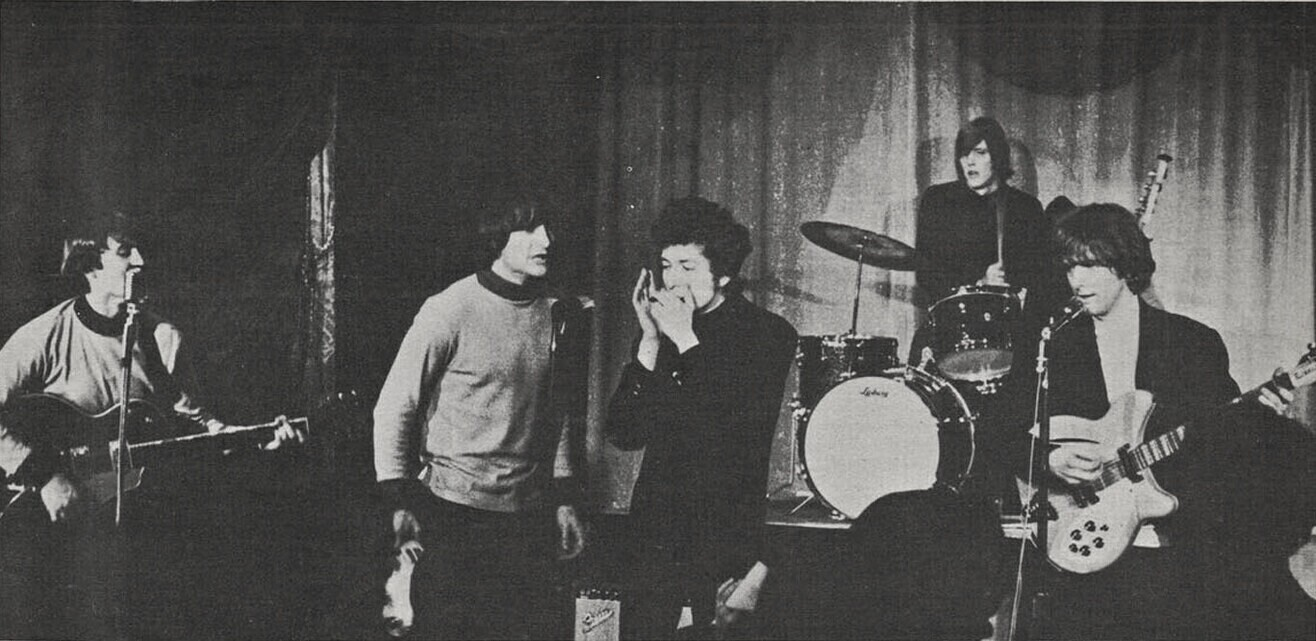
Bob Dylan joins the Byrds onstage at Ciro's, March 26, 1965

Columbia Records eventually released the "Mr. Tambourine Man" single on April 12, 1965. The full, electric rock band treatment that the Byrds and producer Terry Melcher had given the song effectively created the template for the musical subgenre of folk rock. McGuinn's melodic, jangling 12-string Rickenbacker guitar playing—which was heavily compressed to produce an extremely bright and sustained tone—was immediately influential and has remained so to the present day. The single also featured another major characteristic of the band's sound: their clear harmony singing, which usually featured McGuinn and Clark in unison, with Crosby providing the high harmony. Richie Unterberger has stated that the song's abstract lyrics took rock and pop songwriting to new heights; never before had such intellectual and literary wordplay been combined with rock instrumentation by a popular music group.

Within three months "Mr. Tambourine Man" had become the first folk rock smash hit, reaching number 1 on both the U.S. Billboard Hot 100 chart and the UK Singles Chart. The single's success initiated the folk rock boom of 1965 and 1966, during which a number of Byrds-influenced acts had hits on the American and British charts. The term "folk rock" was itself coined by the American music press to describe the band's sound in June 1965, at roughly the same time as "Mr. Tambourine Man" peaked at number 1 in the U.S.

The Mr. Tambourine Man album followed on June 21, 1965, peaking at number six on the Billboard Top LPs chart and number seven on the UK Albums Chart. The album mixed reworkings of folk songs, including Pete Seeger's musical adaptation of the Idris Davies' poem "The Bells of Rhymney", with a number of other Dylan covers and the band's own compositions, the majority of which were written by Clark. In particular, Clark's "I'll Feel a Whole Lot Better" has gone on to become a rock music standard, with many critics considering it one of the band's and Clark's best songs. Upon release, the Mr. Tambourine Man album, like the single of the same name, was influential in popularizing folk rock and served to establish the band as an internationally successful rock act, representing the first effective American challenge to the dominance of the Beatles and the British Invasion.

All I Really Want to Do
A sample of the Byrds' recording of "All I Really Want to Do", illustrating the ascending melody progression in the song's refrain and the Beatlesque melody used in its third verse.

The Byrds' next single was "All I Really Want to Do", another interpretation of a Dylan song. Despite the success of "Mr. Tambourine Man", the Byrds were reluctant to release another Dylan-penned single, feeling that it was too formulaic, but Columbia Records were insistent, believing that another Dylan cover would result in an instant hit for the group. The Byrds' rendition of "All I Really Want to Do" is noticeably different in structure to Dylan's original: it features an ascending melody progression in the chorus and uses a completely new melody for one of the song's verses, to turn it into a Beatlesque, minor-key bridge. Issued on June 14, 1965, while "Mr. Tambourine Man" was still climbing the U.S. charts, the single was rush-released by Columbia in an attempt to bury a rival cover version that Cher had released simultaneously on Imperial Records. A chart battle ensued, but the Byrds' rendition stalled at number 40 on the Billboard Hot 100, while Cher's version reached number 15. The reverse was true in the UK, where the Byrds' version reached number 4, while Cher's peaked at number 9.

Author John Einarson has written that during this period of their career, the Byrds enjoyed tremendous popularity among teenage pop fans, with their music receiving widespread airplay on Top 40 radio and their faces adorning countless teen magazines. Much was made at the time of the Byrds' unconventional dress sense, with their casual attire strikingly at odds with the prevailing trend for uniformity among contemporary beat groups. With all five members sporting Beatlesque moptop haircuts, Crosby dressed in a striking green suede cape, and McGuinn wearing a pair of distinctive rectangular "granny glasses", the band exuded California cool, while also looking suitably non-conformist. In particular, McGuinn's distinctive rectangular spectacles became popular among members of the burgeoning hippie counterculture in the United States.

Although McGuinn was widely regarded as the Byrds' bandleader by this point, the band actually had multiple frontmen, with McGuinn, Clark, and later Crosby and Hillman all singing lead vocals in roughly equal measures across the group's repertoire. Despite the dizzying array of personnel changes that the group underwent in later years, this lack of a dedicated lead singer remained a stylistic trait of the Byrds' music throughout the majority of the band's existence.

A further distinctive aspect of the Byrds' image was their unsmiling air of detachment, both on stage and in front of the camera. This natural aloofness was compounded by the large amounts of marijuana that the band smoked and often resulted in moody and erratic live performances. The contemporary music press was extremely critical of the Byrds' abilities as a live act during the mid-1960s, with the reception from the British media during the band's August 1965 tour of England being particularly scathing.

We got there and they expected a professional thing and we weren't ready for it. I mean, some of us had been professional in one capacity or another, but never as a group.

I got sick, I had like a hundred and three something fever ... So I'm lying on a couch or something there and everybody's going crazy – nobody has any organization anymore ... everybody quit right there and said, "I quit, I'm going home," you know. Anyway, it all got back together.

— Roger McGuinn, describing the disastrous 1965 English tour in a 1968 interview

This 1965 English tour was largely orchestrated by the group's publicist Derek Taylor, in an attempt to capitalize on the number 1 chart success of the "Mr. Tambourine Man" single. The tour was overhyped from the start, with the band being touted as "America's answer to the Beatles", a label that proved impossible for the Byrds to live up to. During concert performances, a combination of poor sound, group illness, ragged musicianship, and the band's notoriously lackluster stage presence all combined to alienate audiences and served to provoke a merciless castigating of the band in the British press.

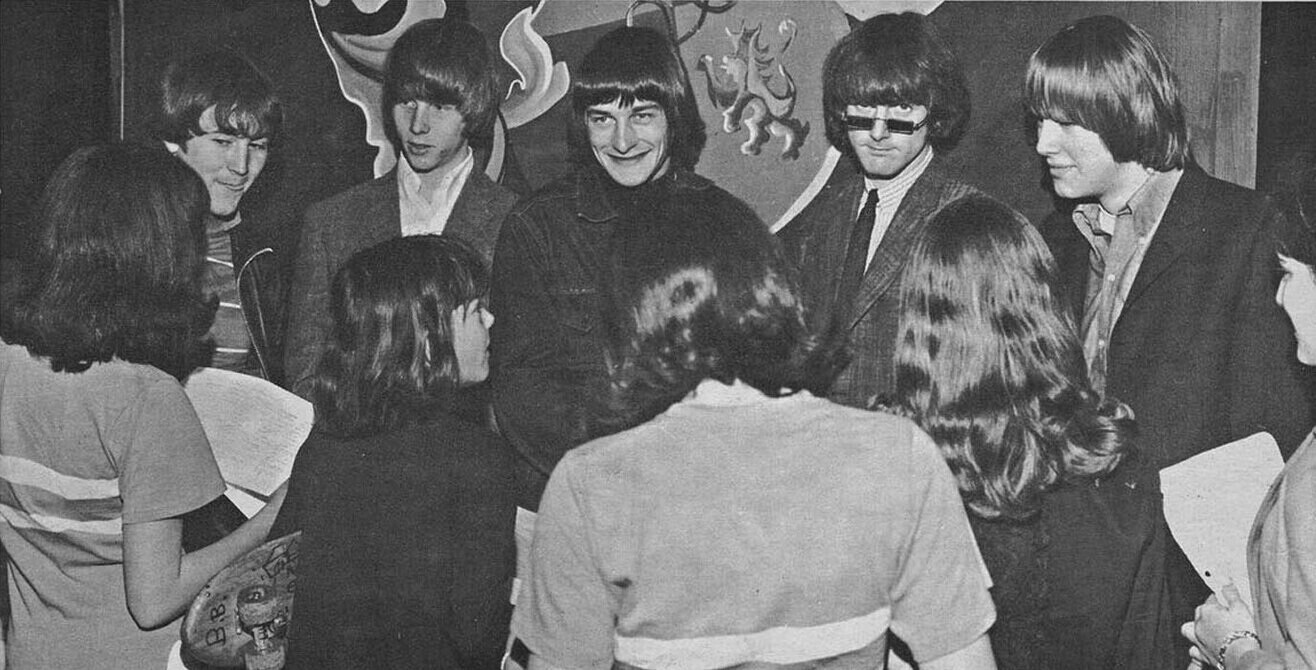
The Byrds greeting fans, 1965

The tour enabled the band to meet and socialize with a number of top English groups, including the Rolling Stones and the Beatles. In particular, the band's relationship with the Beatles would prove important for both acts, with the two groups again meeting in Los Angeles some weeks later, upon the Byrds' return to America. During this period of fraternization, the Beatles were vocal in their support of the Byrds, publicly acknowledging them as creative competitors and naming them as their favorite American group. A number of authors, including Ian MacDonald, Richie Unterberger, and Bud Scoppa, have commented on the Byrds influence on the Beatles' late 1965 album Rubber Soul, most notably on the songs "Nowhere Man" and "If I Needed Someone", the latter of which utilizes a guitar riff similar to that in the Byrds' cover of "The Bells of Rhymney".

Turn! Turn! Turn! (to Everything There Is a Season)
An excerpt from the Byrds' recording of "Turn! Turn! Turn! (to Everything There Is a Season)", which provided the band with their second U.S. number 1 single and served to cement folk rock as a chart trend.

For their third Columbia single, the Byrds initially intended to release a cover of Dylan's "It's All Over Now, Baby Blue" (it was even premiered on the California radio station KRLA), but instead they decided to record "Turn! Turn! Turn! (to Everything There Is a Season)", a Pete Seeger composition with lyrics adapted almost entirely from the biblical Book of Ecclesiastes. The song was brought to the group by McGuinn, who had previously arranged it in a chamber-folk style while working on folk singer Judy Collins' 1963 album, Judy Collins 3. The Byrds' cover of "Turn! Turn! Turn! (to Everything There Is a Season)" was issued on October 1, 1965, and became the band's second U.S. number-1 single, as well as the title track for their second album. The single represented the high-water mark of folk rock as a chart trend and has been described by music historian Richie Unterberger as "folk rock's highest possible grace note". Music critic William Ruhlmann has written that the song's lyrical message of peace and tolerance struck a nerve with the American record buying public as the Vietnam War continued to escalate.

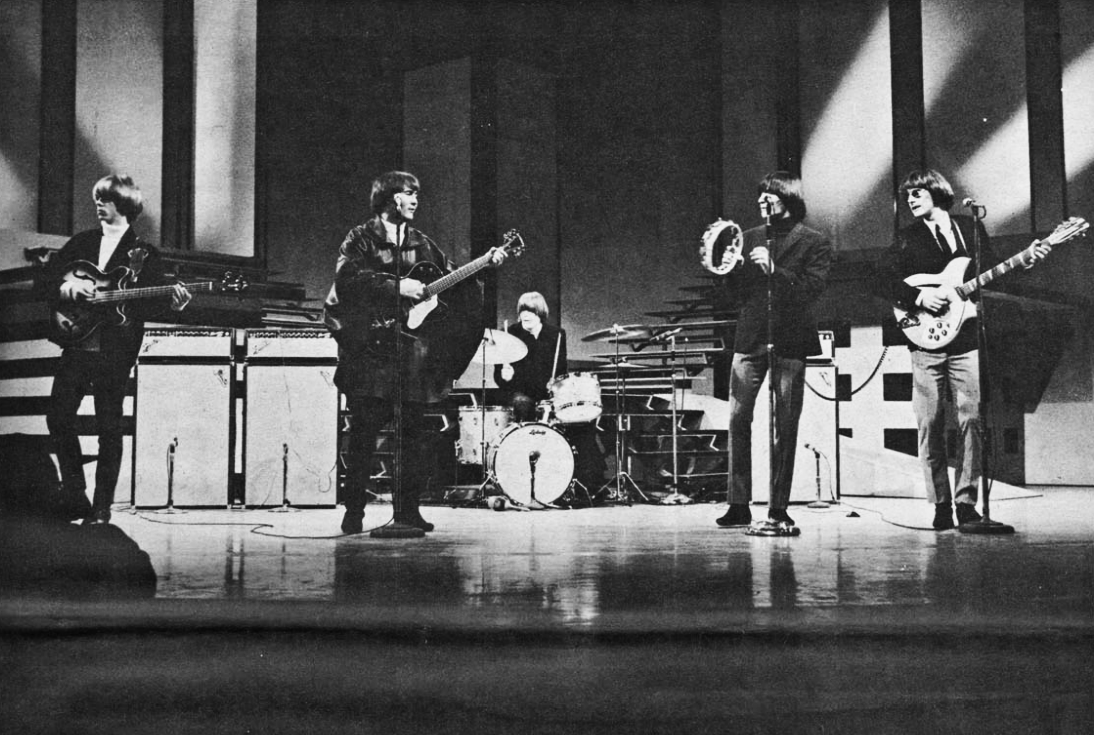
The Byrds on The Big T.N.T Show, November 29, 1965

The Byrds' second album, Turn! Turn! Turn!, was released in December 1965 and while it received a mostly positive reception, critical consensus deemed it to be inferior to the band's debut. Irrespective of the critics' opinions, the album was a commercial success, peaking at number 17 on the U.S. charts and number 11 in the UK. Author Scott Schinder has stated that Turn! Turn! Turn!, along with Mr. Tambourine Man, served to establish the Byrds as one of rock music's most important creative forces, on a par with the Beatles, the Beach Boys and the Rolling Stones. Like their debut, the album comprised a mixture of group originals, folk songs, and Bob Dylan covers, all characterized by the group's clear harmonies and McGuinn's distinctive guitar sound. The album featured more of the band's own compositions than its predecessor, with Clark in particular coming to the fore as a songwriter. His songs from this period, including "She Don't Care About Time", "The World Turns All Around Her", and "Set You Free This Time", are widely regarded by critics as among the best of the folk rock genre. The latter song was even chosen for release as a single in January 1966, but its densely worded lyrics, melancholy melody, and ballad-like tempo contributed to it stalling at number 63 on the Billboard chart and failing to reach the UK chart altogether.

While the Byrds outwardly seemed to be riding the crest of a wave during the latter half of 1965, the recording sessions for their second album had not been without tension. One source of conflict was the power struggle that had begun to develop between producer Melcher and the band's manager, Jim Dickson, with the latter harboring aspirations to produce the band himself, causing him to be overly critical of the former's work. Within a month of Turn! Turn! Turn! being released, Dickson and the Byrds approached Columbia Records and requested that Melcher be replaced, despite the fact that he had successfully steered the band through the recording of two number 1 singles and two hit albums. Any hopes that Dickson had of being allowed to produce the band himself were dashed when Columbia assigned their West Coast head of A&R, Allen Stanton, to the band.

=== Psychedelia (1965–1967) ===
On December 22, 1965, the Byrds recorded a new, self-penned composition titled "Eight Miles High" at RCA Studios in Hollywood. Columbia Records refused to release this version because it had been recorded at another record company's facility. As a result, the band was forced to re-record the song at Columbia Studios in Los Angeles on January 24 and 25, 1966. This re-recorded version was released as a single and included on the group's third album. The song represented a creative leap forward for the band and is often considered by critics to be the first full-blown psychedelic rock recording, although other contemporaneous acts, such as Donovan and the Yardbirds, were also exploring similar musical territory. It was also pivotal in transmuting folk rock into the new musical forms of psychedelia and raga rock.

"Eight Miles High" is marked by McGuinn's groundbreaking lead guitar playing, which saw the guitarist attempting to emulate the free form jazz saxophone playing of John Coltrane, and in particular, Coltrane's playing on the song "India" from his Impressions album. It also exhibits the influence of the Indian classical music of Ravi Shankar in the droning quality of the song's vocal melody and in McGuinn's guitar playing. The song's subtle use of Indian influences resulted in it being labeled as "raga rock" by the music press, but in fact, it was the single's B-side, "Why", that drew more directly on Indian ragas.

Byrds press conference in March 1966, with McGuinn playing sitar to illustrate the Indian classical music influences in "Eight Miles High".

Upon release, "Eight Miles High" was banned by many U.S. radio stations, following allegations made by the broadcasting trade journal the Gavin Report that its lyrics advocated recreational drug use. The band and their management strenuously denied these allegations, stating that the song's lyrics actually described an airplane flight to London and the band's subsequent concert tour of England. The relatively modest chart success of "Eight Miles High" (number 14 in the U.S. and number 24 in the UK) has been largely attributed to the broadcasting ban, although the challenging and slightly uncommercial nature of the track is another possible reason for its failure to reach the Top 10.

Eight Miles High
An excerpt from the intro of "Eight Miles High", demonstrating the John Coltrane-influenced, free form guitar playing of Roger McGuinn.

In February 1966, just prior to the release of "Eight Miles High", Gene Clark left the band. His departure was partly due to his fear of flying, which made it impossible for him to keep up with the Byrds' itinerary, and partly due to his increasing isolation within the band. Clark, who had witnessed a fatal airplane crash as a youth, had a panic attack on a plane bound for New York and as a result, he disembarked and refused to take the flight. In effect, Clark's exit from the plane represented his exit from the Byrds, with McGuinn telling him, "If you can't fly, you can't be a Byrd." It has become known in the years since the incident that there were other stress and anxiety-related factors at work, as well as resentment within the band that Gene's songwriting income had made him the wealthiest member of the group. Clark was subsequently signed by Columbia Records as a solo artist and went on to produce a critically acclaimed but commercially unsuccessful body of work. He died on May 24, 1991, at the age of 46, from heart failure brought on by a bleeding stomach ulcer, although years of alcohol abuse and heavy cigarette smoking were also contributing factors.

The Byrds' third album, Fifth Dimension, was released in July 1966. Much of the album's material continued to build on the band's new psychedelic sound, with McGuinn extending his exploration of jazz and raga styles on tracks such as "I See You" and the Crosby-penned "What's Happening?!?!". The album also saw Hillman coming forward as the band's third vocalist, to fill the hole in the group's harmonies that Clark's departure had left. The title track, "5D (Fifth Dimension)", was released as a single ahead of the album and was, like "Eight Miles High" before it, banned by a number of U.S. radio stations for supposedly featuring lyrics that advocated drug use. The album's front cover artwork featured the first appearance of the Byrds' colorful, psychedelic mosaic logo, variations of which would subsequently appear on a number of the band's compilation albums, as well as on their 1967 release, Younger Than Yesterday.

The Fifth Dimension album received a mixed critical reception upon release and was less commercially successful than its predecessors, peaking at number 24 in the U.S. and number 27 in the UK. Band biographer Bud Scoppa has remarked that with the album's lackluster chart performance, its lukewarm critical reception, and the high-profile loss of Clark from the group, the Byrds' popularity began to wane at this point and by late 1966, the group had been all but forgotten by the mainstream pop audience. Despite this, the band were considered forefathers of the emerging rock underground, with many of the new L.A. and San Francisco groups of the day, including Love, Jefferson Airplane, and Buffalo Springfield, publicly naming the Byrds as a primary influence.

The Byrds' psychedelic mosaic logo

The band returned to the studio between November 28 and December 8, 1966, to record their fourth album, Younger Than Yesterday. With Allen Stanton having recently departed Columbia Records to work for A&M, the band chose to bring in producer Gary Usher to help guide them through the album sessions. Usher, who had a wealth of production experience and a love of innovative studio experimentation, would prove invaluable to the Byrds as they entered their most creatively adventurous phase. The first song to be recorded for the album was the McGuinn and Hillman-penned "So You Want to Be a Rock 'n' Roll Star", a satirical and heavily sarcastic jibe at the manufactured nature of groups like the Monkees. The song features the trumpet playing of South African musician Hugh Masekela and, as such, marks the first appearance of brass on a Byrds' recording. "So You Want to Be a Rock 'n' Roll Star" was issued as a single in January 1967 and peaked at number 29 in America but failed to chart in the UK. Despite this relatively poor chart showing, "So You Want to Be a Rock 'n' Roll Star" has become one of the Byrds' best-known songs in the years since its initial release, inspiring cover versions by the likes of Tom Petty and the Heartbreakers and the Patti Smith Group among others.

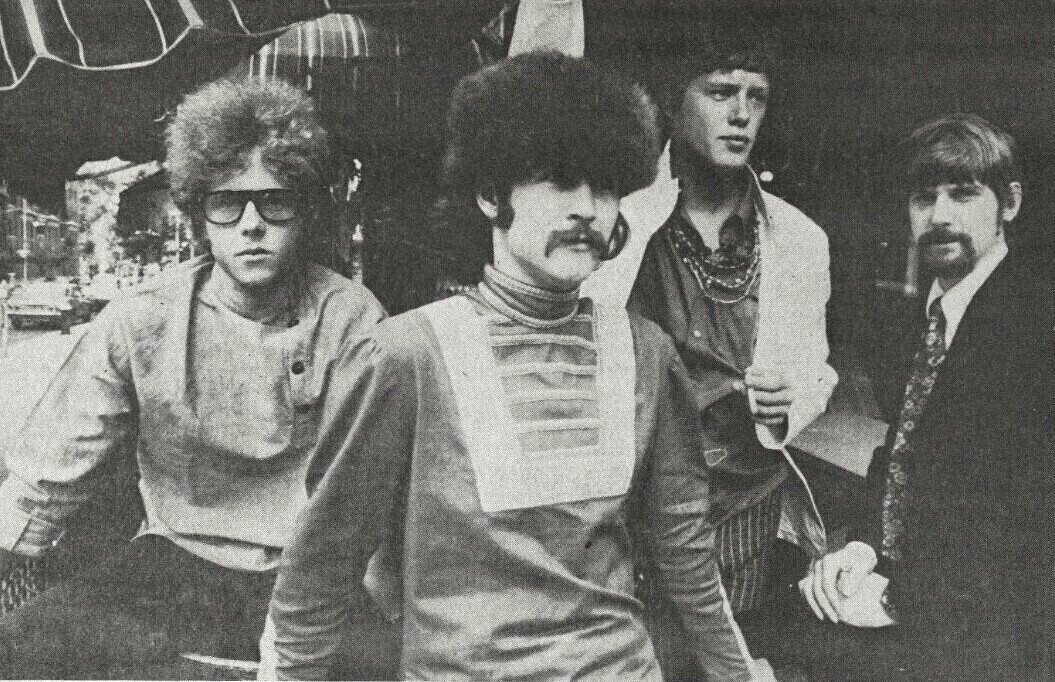
The Byrds in New York City, 1967

Time Between
A sample of the country-influenced Chris Hillman composition "Time Between", which foreshadowed the Byrds' later exploration of the country rock genre.

Released on February 6, 1967, the Byrds' fourth album, Younger Than Yesterday, was more varied than its predecessor and saw the band successfully mixing psychedelia with folk rock and country and western influences. Although it received generally positive reviews upon its release, the album was, to a degree, overlooked by the record-buying public and consequently peaked at number 24 on the Billboard chart and number 37 on the UK Albums Chart. Music expert Peter Buckley has pointed out that although the album may have passed the Byrds' rapidly shrinking teen audience by, it found favor with "a new underground following who disdained hit singles, but were coming to regard albums as major artistic statements".

In addition to "So You Want to Be a Rock 'n' Roll Star", Younger Than Yesterday also includes the evocative Crosby and McGuinn penned song "Renaissance Fair", a cover of Dylan's "My Back Pages" (which was later released as a single), and a quartet of Chris Hillman songs, which found the bassist emerging fully formed as an accomplished songwriter. Two of Hillman's country-oriented compositions on the album, "Time Between" and "The Girl with No Name", can be seen as early indicators of the country rock direction that the band would pursue on later albums. Younger Than Yesterday also features the jazz-tinged Crosby ballad "Everybody's Been Burned", which critic Thomas Ward has described as "one of the most haunting songs in the Byrds' catalogue, and one of David Crosby's finest compositions".

By mid-1967, McGuinn had changed his first name from Jim to Roger as a result of his interest in the Indonesian religion Subud, into which he had been initiated in January 1965. The adoption of a new name was common among followers of the religion and served to signify a spiritual rebirth for the participant. Shortly after McGuinn's name change, the band entered the studio to record the Crosby-penned, non-album single "Lady Friend", which was released on July 13, 1967. The Byrds' biographer Johnny Rogan has described "Lady Friend" as "a work of great maturity" and "the loudest, fastest and rockiest Byrds' single to date". Regardless of its artistic merits, the single stalled at a disappointing number 82 on the Billboard chart, despite the band making a number of high-profile television appearances to promote the record. Crosby, who had closely overseen the recording of the song, was bitterly disappointed by the single's lack of success and blamed Gary Usher's mixing of the song as a factor in its commercial failure.

The poor sales suffered by "Lady Friend" were in stark contrast to the chart success of the band's first compilation album, The Byrds' Greatest Hits, which was released on August 7, 1967. Sanctioned by Columbia Records in the wake of the Top 10 success of Bob Dylan's Greatest Hits, the album was a critical and commercial triumph, peaking at number six on the Billboard Top LPs chart and giving the band their highest-charting album in America since their 1965 debut, Mr. Tambourine Man. Within a year, the compilation was certified gold by the Recording Industry Association of America, and eventually went platinum on November 21, 1986, and is today the biggest-selling album in the Byrds' discography.

Prior to the release of The Byrds' Greatest Hits, the band decided to dispense with the services of their co-managers Jim Dickson and Eddie Tickner. The relationship between Dickson and the band had soured over recent months, and he and Tickner's business arrangement with the Byrds was officially dissolved on June 30, 1967. At Crosby's recommendation, Larry Spector was brought in to handle the Byrds' business affairs, with the group electing to manage themselves to a large extent.

Old John Robertson
An excerpt from the song "Old John Robertson", highlighting the Byrds' extensive use of phasing and flanging effects on The Notorious Byrd Brothers album.

Between June and December 1967, the Byrds worked on completing their fifth album, The Notorious Byrd Brothers. The lead single from the album was a cover of the Gerry Goffin and Carole King song "Goin' Back", which was released in October 1967 and peaked at number 89 on the Billboard chart. Despite this lack of commercial success, the Byrds' rendition of "Goin' Back" featured a band performance that author Ric Menck has described as "a beautiful recording", while music critic Richie Unterberger has called it "a magnificent and melodic cover ... that should have been a big hit". The song found the Byrds successfully blending their signature harmonies and chiming 12-string guitar playing with the sound of the pedal steel guitar for the first time, foreshadowing their extensive use of the instrument on their next album, Sweetheart of the Rodeo.

Released in January 1968, The Notorious Byrd Brothers saw the band taking their psychedelic experimentation to its furthest extremes by mixing folk rock, country music, jazz, and psychedelia (often within a single song), while using innovative studio production techniques such as phasing and flanging. The album featured contributions from a number of noted session musicians, including bluegrass guitarist and future Byrd, Clarence White. White, who had also played on Younger Than Yesterday, contributed country-influenced guitar to the tracks "Natural Harmony", "Wasn't Born to Follow", and "Change Is Now". Upon release, the album was almost universally praised by music critics but it was only moderately successful commercially, particularly in the United States where it peaked at number 47. The album's reputation has grown over the years and has become widely regarded by critics and fans as one of the Byrds' best albums.

=== Lineup changes (1967–1968) ===
While the band worked on The Notorious Byrd Brothers album throughout late 1967, there was increasing tension and acrimony among the members of the group, which eventually resulted in the dismissals of Crosby and Clarke. McGuinn and Hillman became increasingly irritated by what they saw as Crosby's overbearing egotism and his attempts to dictate the band's musical direction. In addition, during the Byrds' performance at the Monterey Pop Festival on June 17, 1967, Crosby gave lengthy in-between-song speeches on controversial subjects, including the JFK assassination and the benefits of giving LSD to "all the statesmen and politicians in the world", to the intense annoyance of the other band members. He further irritated his bandmates by performing with rival group Buffalo Springfield at Monterey, filling in for ex-member Neil Young. His reputation within the band deteriorated even more following the commercial failure of "Lady Friend", the first Byrds' single to feature a song penned solely by Crosby on its A-side.

They came over and said that they wanted to throw me out. They came zooming up in their Porsches and said that I was impossible to work with and I wasn't very good anyway and they'd do better without me. And frankly, I've been laughing ever since. Fuck 'em. But it hurt like hell. I didn't try to reason with them. I just said, "it's a shameful waste ... goodbye".

— David Crosby talking in 1980 about the day Roger McGuinn and Chris Hillman fired him from the Byrds

Tensions within the band finally erupted in August 1967, when Michael Clarke quit the recording sessions for The Notorious Byrd Brothers over disputes with his bandmates and his dissatisfaction with the material that the songwriting members of the band were providing. Session drummers Jim Gordon and Hal Blaine were brought in to replace Clarke temporarily in the studio, although he continued to honor his live concert commitments with the group. Then, in September, Crosby refused to participate in the recording of the Goffin–King song "Goin' Back", considering it to be inferior to his own "Triad", a controversial song about a ménage à trois that was in direct competition with "Goin' Back" for a place on the album. Crosby felt that the band should rely on self-penned material for their albums, rather than cover songs by other artists and writers. He would eventually give "Triad" to the San Francisco band Jefferson Airplane, who included a recording of it on their 1968 album, Crown of Creation.

When tensions reached a breaking point during October 1967, McGuinn and Hillman drove to Crosby's home and fired him, stating that they would be better off without him. Crosby subsequently received a cash settlement, with which he bought a sailboat and soon after, he began working with Stephen Stills and Graham Nash in the successful supergroup Crosby, Stills & Nash. In the years after his exit from the Byrds, Crosby enjoyed an influential and commercially successful career as a part of Crosby, Stills & Nash (sometimes augmented by Neil Young), Crosby & Nash, CPR, and as a solo artist. During the 1980s, he fought against crippling drug addiction and eventually served a year in prison on drug-related charges. He emerged from jail free of his drug habit and remained musically active up to his death in 2023.

Following Crosby's departure, Gene Clark briefly rejoined the band, but left just three weeks later, after again refusing to board an aircraft while on tour. There is some disagreement among biographers and band historians as to whether Clark actually participated in the recording sessions for The Notorious Byrd Brothers, but there is evidence to suggest that he sang backing vocals on the songs "Goin' Back" and "Space Odyssey". Michael Clarke also returned to the recording studio briefly, towards the end of the album sessions, before being informed by McGuinn and Hillman that they were dismissing him from the band.

Now reduced to a duo, McGuinn and Hillman elected to hire new band members. Hillman's cousin Kevin Kelley was quickly recruited as the band's new drummer and the trio embarked on an early 1968 college tour in support of The Notorious Byrd Brothers. It soon became apparent that recreating the band's studio recordings with a three-piece lineup wasn't going to be possible and so, McGuinn and Hillman, in a fateful decision for their future career direction, hired Gram Parsons as a keyboard player, although he quickly moved to guitar. Although Parsons and Kelley were both considered full members of the Byrds, they actually received a salary from McGuinn and Hillman, and did not sign with Columbia Records when the Byrds' recording contract was renewed on February 29, 1968.

=== Country rock (1968–1973) ===
==== Gram Parsons era ====
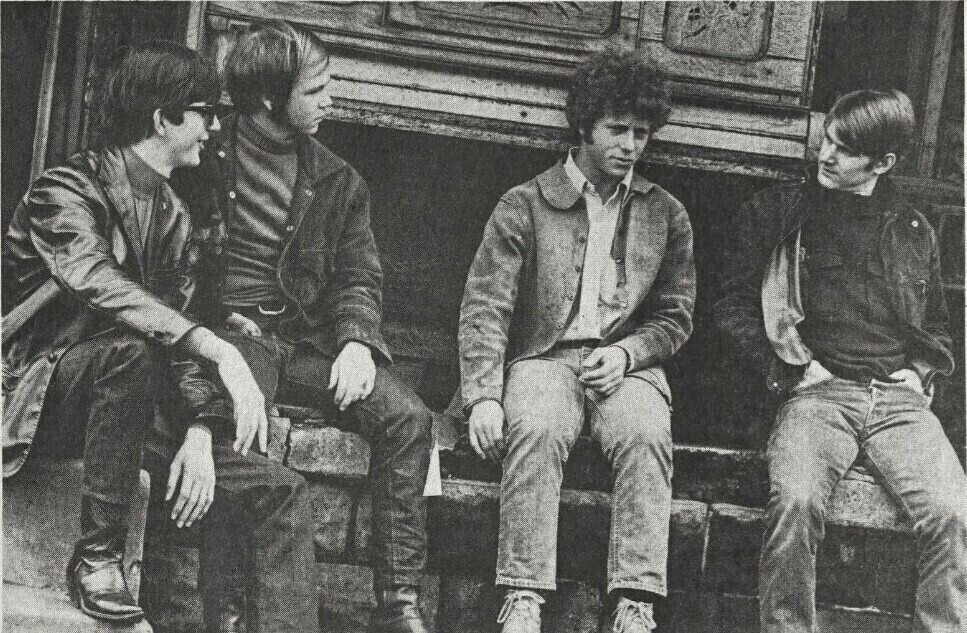
The Byrds in 1968, L to R: Gram Parsons, Kevin Kelley, Hillman, McGuinn

Following his induction into the band, Gram Parsons began to assert his own musical agenda in which he intended to marry his love of country and western music with youth culture's passion for rock and, in doing so, make country music fashionable for a young audience. He found a kindred spirit in Hillman, who had played mandolin in a number of notable bluegrass bands before joining the Byrds. In addition, Hillman had also persuaded the Byrds to incorporate subtle country influences into their music in the past, beginning with the song "Satisfied Mind" on the Turn! Turn! Turn! album. Although McGuinn had some reservations about the band's proposed new direction, Parsons convinced him that a move towards country music could theoretically expand the group's declining audience. Thus, McGuinn was persuaded to change direction and abandon his original concept for the group's next album, which had been to record a history of 20th century American popular music, and instead explore country rock.

On March 9, 1968, the band decamped to Columbia's recording studios in Nashville, Tennessee, with Clarence White in tow, to begin the recording sessions for the Sweetheart of the Rodeo album. While in Nashville, the Byrds also appeared at the Grand Ole Opry on March 15, 1968, where they performed the Merle Haggard song "Sing Me Back Home" and Parsons' own "Hickory Wind" (although they were actually scheduled to play a second Haggard song, "Life in Prison"). Being the first group of hippie "longhairs" ever to play at the venerable country music institution, the band was met with heckling, booing, and mocking calls of "tweet, tweet" from the conservative Opry audience.

The band also incurred the wrath of renowned country music DJ Ralph Emery, when they appeared on his Nashville-based WSM radio program. Emery mocked the band throughout their interview and made no secret of his dislike for their newly recorded country rock single, "You Ain't Goin' Nowhere". Parsons and McGuinn would later write the pointedly sarcastic song "Drug Store Truck Drivin' Man" about Emery and their appearance on his show. Journalist David Fricke has described the reactions of Emery and the Grand Ole Opry audience as indicative of the resistance and hostility that the Byrds' venture into country music provoked from the Nashville old guard.

There was a genuine concern that we would get sued if we kept Gram's vocals on it. So we put mine on and then the contract dispute went away ... Basically it was a misunderstanding. I wouldn't have had any involvement at all if it had been up to Gram. He was taking over the band, so we couldn't really let that happen.

— Roger McGuinn on replacing some of Gram Parsons' vocals on the Sweetheart of the Rodeo album

Following their stay in Nashville, the band returned to Los Angeles and throughout April and May 1968, they worked on completing their new country-oriented album. During this period, Parsons attempted to exert a controlling influence over the group by pressuring McGuinn to recruit either JayDee Maness or Sneaky Pete Kleinow as the band's permanent pedal steel guitar player. When McGuinn refused, Parsons next began to push for a higher salary, while also demanding that the group be billed as "Gram Parsons and the Byrds" on their forthcoming album. Even Hillman, who had previously been Parsons' biggest supporter in the band, began to grow weary of his forceful demands. Ultimately, Parsons' behavior led to a power struggle for control of the group, with McGuinn finding his position as band leader challenged. Biographer Johnny Rogan has pointed out that the April 1968 release of "You Ain't Goin' Nowhere" served to strengthen McGuinn's position as head Byrd, with the guitarist's familiar drawl occupying the lead vocal spot and negligible input from Parsons, despite the single's obvious country leanings.

Parsons' dominance over the band waned still further during post-production for Sweetheart of the Rodeo, when his appearance on the album was contested by music business impresario Lee Hazlewood, who alleged that the singer was still under contract to his LHI record label, creating legal complications for Columbia Records. As a result of this, McGuinn and Hillman replaced Parsons' lead vocals on the songs "You Don't Miss Your Water", "The Christian Life", and "One Hundred Years from Now" before the legal problems could be resolved. Album producer Gary Usher would later put a different slant on the events surrounding the removal of Parsons' vocals by telling his biographer Stephen J. McParland that the alterations to the album arose out of creative concerns, not legal ones; Usher and the band were both worried that Parsons' contributions were dominating the record so his vocals were excised in an attempt to increase McGuinn and Hillman's presence on the album. In the album's final running order, Parsons is still featured as lead vocalist on the songs "You're Still on My Mind", "Life in Prison", and "Hickory Wind".

With their new album now completed, the Byrds flew to England for an appearance at a charity concert at the Royal Albert Hall on July 7, 1968. Following the concert, just prior to a tour of South Africa, Parsons quit the Byrds on the grounds that he did not want to perform in a racially segregated country (apartheid did not end in South Africa until 1994). Hillman doubted the sincerity of Parsons' gesture, believing that the singer had in fact left the band to remain in England with Mick Jagger and Keith Richards of the Rolling Stones, whom he had recently befriended. Parsons stayed at Richards' house in West Sussex immediately after leaving the Byrds, and the pair developed a close friendship over the next few years. After leaving the Byrds, Parsons produced an influential but commercially unsuccessful body of work, both as a solo artist and with the band the Flying Burrito Brothers (which also featured Hillman). He died on September 19, 1973, at the age of 26, following an accidental overdose of morphine and alcohol in his room at the Joshua Tree Inn.

With Parsons gone from the band and their tour of South Africa due to begin in two days time, the Byrds were forced to draft in their roadie Carlos Bernal as a substitute rhythm guitar player. The ensuing South African tour was a disaster, with the band finding themselves having to play to segregated audiences—something that they had been assured by promoters they would not have to do. The under-rehearsed band gave ramshackle performances to audiences that were largely unimpressed with their lack of professionalism and their antagonistic, anti-apartheid stance. The Byrds left South Africa amid a storm of bad publicity and death threats, while the liberal press in the U.S. and the UK attacked the band for undertaking the tour and questioned their political integrity. McGuinn attempted to counter this criticism by asserting that the tour of South Africa had, in some small way, been an attempt to challenge the country's political status quo and protest against apartheid.

You Ain't Goin' Nowhere
As the lead single from Sweetheart of the Rodeo, "You Ain't Goin' Nowhere" became the first full-blown country rock release by the Byrds. As such, it provided the public at large with their first opportunity to hear the band's new musical direction.

After returning to California, the Byrds' released the Sweetheart of the Rodeo album on August 30, 1968, almost eight weeks after Parsons had left the band. It comprised a mixture of country music standards and contemporary country material, along with a country reworking of William Bell's soul hit "You Don't Miss Your Water". The album also included the Parsons originals "Hickory Wind" and "One Hundred Years from Now", along with the Bob Dylan-penned songs "Nothing Was Delivered" and "You Ain't Goin' Nowhere", the latter of which had been a moderately successful single. Although it was not the first country rock album, Sweetheart of the Rodeo was the first album widely labeled as country rock to be released by an internationally successful rock act, pre-dating Dylan's Nashville Skyline by over six months.

The stylistic shift away from psychedelia towards country rock that Sweetheart of the Rodeo represented alienated much of the Byrds' countercultural audience, while at the same time eliciting hostility from the ultra-conservative Nashville country music establishment. As a result, the album peaked at number 77 on the U.S. charts and was the least commercially successful Byrds' album to date upon its initial release. Today, it is considered a seminal and highly influential album, serving as a blueprint for the entire 1970s country rock movement, the outlaw country scene, and the alternative country genre of the 1990s and early 21st century.

==== Clarence White era ====
After Gram Parsons' departure, McGuinn and Hillman decided to recruit noted session guitarist Clarence White as a full-time member of the band in late July 1968. White, who had contributed countrified guitar playing to every Byrds' album since 1967's Younger Than Yesterday, was brought in at Hillman's suggestion as someone who could handle the band's older rock repertoire and their newer country-oriented material. Shortly after his induction into the band, White began to express dissatisfaction with drummer Kevin Kelley and soon persuaded McGuinn and Hillman to replace him with Gene Parsons (no relation to Gram), who White had previously played with in the country rock band Nashville West.

The McGuinn–Hillman–White–Parsons lineup was together for less than a month before Hillman quit to join Gram Parsons in forming the Flying Burrito Brothers. Hillman had become increasingly disenchanted with the Byrds since the South African debacle, and was also frustrated by business manager Larry Spector's mishandling of the group's finances. Things came to a head on September 15, 1968, following a band performance at the Rose Bowl stadium in Pasadena, when Hillman and Spector came to blows backstage. In a fit of rage, Hillman threw down his bass in disgust and walked out of the group. Following his exit, Hillman would have a successful career both as a solo artist and with bands such as the Flying Burrito Brothers, Manassas, the Souther–Hillman–Furay Band, and the Desert Rose Band. He remains active, releasing albums and touring, often with ex-Desert Rose Band member Herb Pedersen.

As the only original band member left, McGuinn elected to hire bassist John York as Hillman's replacement. York had previously been a member of the Sir Douglas Quintet and had also worked as a session musician with Johnny Rivers and the Mamas & the Papas. In October 1968, the new lineup entered Columbia Studios in Hollywood to begin recording the Dr. Byrds & Mr. Hyde album with producer Bob Johnston. The sessions saw the band juxtaposing their new country rock sound with more psychedelic-oriented material, giving the resulting album a stylistic split personality that was alluded to in its title. In the wake of the recent changes in band personnel, McGuinn decided that it would be too confusing for fans of the group to hear the unfamiliar voices of White, Parsons and York coming forward at this stage, and so they were relegated to backing vocals on the album. As a result, Dr. Byrds & Mr. Hyde is unique in the Byrds' back catalog as McGuinn sings lead on every track.

Tulsa County (alternate version)
An excerpt from an outtake of the song "Tulsa County", highlighting Clarence White's use of the StringBender device. This guitar accessory was designed by drummer Gene Parsons and fitted to White's Fender Telecaster, allowing him to emulate the sound of a pedal steel guitar. The StringBender became a major characteristic of the Byrds' sound during White's time with the band.

The album was released on March 5, 1969, to generally positive reviews, but in America became the lowest-charting album of the Byrds' career, peaking at number 153 on the Billboard album charts. The album fared much better in the UK, where it attracted glowing reviews and reached number 15. A number of tracks on Dr Byrds & Mr. Hyde, including the instrumental "Nashville West" and the traditional song "Old Blue", featured the sound of the Parsons and White designed StringBender (also known as the B-Bender), an invention that allowed White to duplicate the sound of a pedal steel guitar on his Fender Telecaster. The distinctive sound of the StringBender became characteristic of the Byrds' music during White's tenure.

Following the release of Dr. Byrds & Mr. Hyde the band issued a version of Dylan's "Lay Lady Lay" as a single in May 1969, which failed to reverse the group's commercial fortunes in the U.S., reaching number 132. The Byrds' producer Bob Johnston took it upon himself to overdub a female choir onto the record, something the group only became aware of after the single was issued, leaving them incensed by what they saw as an embarrassing and incongruous addition. As a result, the band dispensed with Johnston and re-enlisted Terry Melcher, who had produced the band's first two albums, to produce their next LP. Although he was happy to accept the band's invitation, Melcher insisted that he also manage the group to avoid a repeat of the conflict he had experienced in 1965 with Jim Dickson.

Prior to the release of the Byrds' next studio album, however, the band's former producer Gary Usher managed to acquire a number of demo recordings from Dickson, dating from the group's 1964 rehearsal sessions at World Pacific Studios. These recordings were subsequently issued as the Preflyte album on Usher's own Together Records imprint in July 1969. Although the material on Preflyte was five years old at the time of its release, the album actually managed to outperform Dr. Byrds & Mr. Hyde in America, garnering moderately enthusiastic reviews and peaking at number 84 on the Billboard album chart.

Between June and August 1969, the Byrds worked with Melcher to complete the Ballad of Easy Rider album. Musically, the album represented a consolidation and streamlining of the band's country rock sound, and mostly consisted of cover versions and traditional material, along with three self-penned originals. The first single to be released from the album was the title track, issued in October 1969 in America and reaching number 65 on the Billboard Hot 100 chart. Composed primarily by McGuinn, with some input from Bob Dylan (although not credited), "Ballad of Easy Rider" was written as the theme tune for the 1969 counterculture film Easy Rider. The Byrds' recording of the song does not appear in the film and an acoustic version credited to McGuinn alone was used instead. The Byrds' song "Wasn't Born to Follow" from The Notorious Byrd Brothers album was featured in the film and also included on the Easy Rider soundtrack album in August 1969. The Byrds' association with the film heightened their public profile and when the Ballad of Easy Rider album was released in November 1969, it peaked at number 36 in the U.S. and number 41 in the UK, becoming the band's highest-charting album for two years in America. A second single taken from the album, "Jesus Is Just Alright", was released in December 1969, but it only managed to reach number 97. Despite this lack of commercial success, the Doobie Brothers' later hit version of "Jesus Is Just Alright" features an arrangement that was heavily influenced by the Byrds' recording.

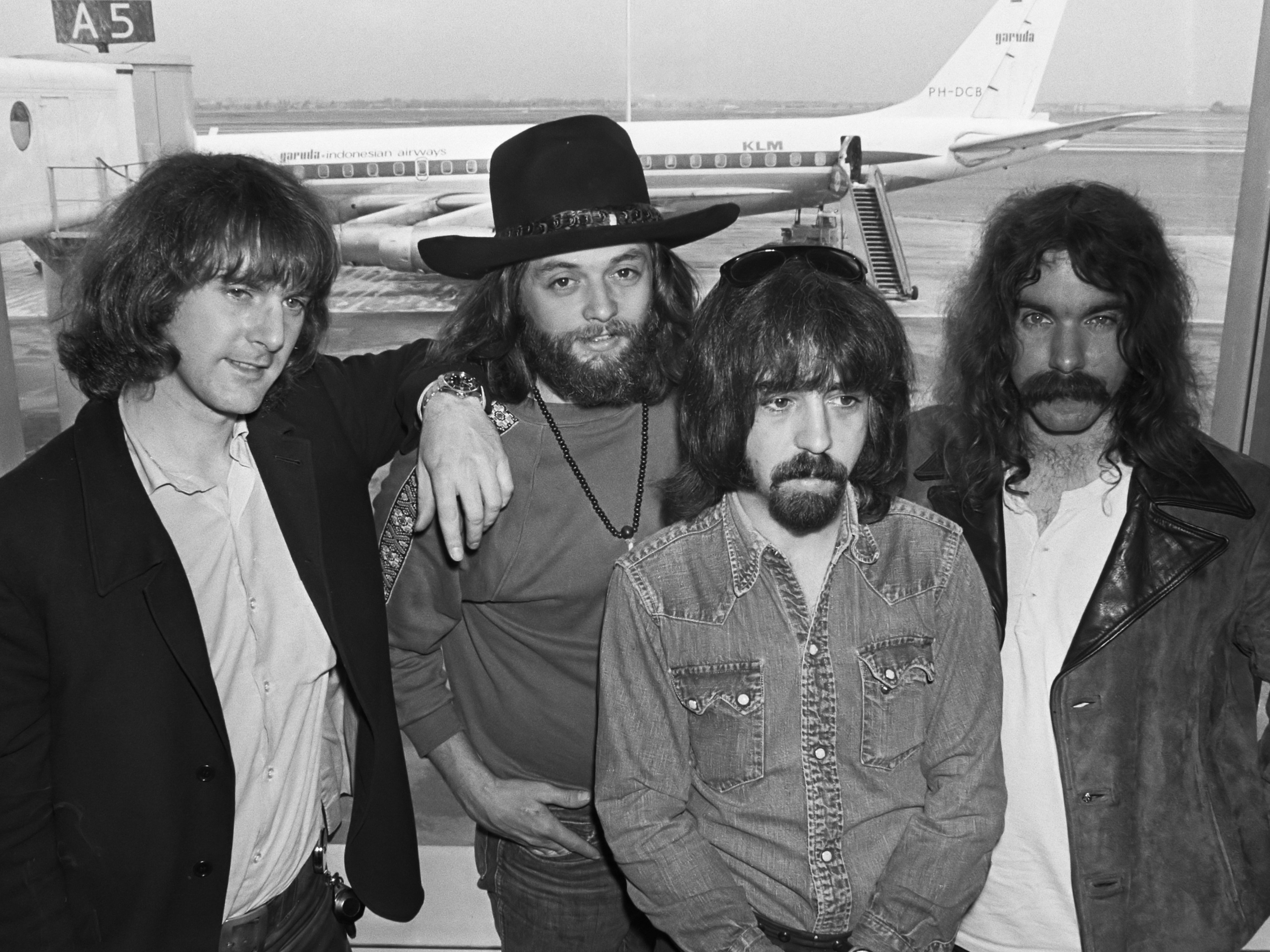
The Byrds in 1970, L to R: McGuinn, Skip Battin, Clarence White, Gene Parsons; the most stable and longest-lived of any Byrds lineup.

Just prior to the release of Ballad of Easy Rider, the Byrds underwent yet another change in personnel when bassist John York was asked to leave the band in September 1969. York had become disenchanted with his role in the Byrds and had voiced his reluctance to perform material that had been written and recorded by the group before he had joined. The rest of the band had begun to doubt his commitment and so, a consensus was reached among the other three members that York should be fired. He was replaced, at the suggestion of Parsons and White, by Skip Battin, a freelance session musician and one-time member of the duo Skip & Flip. Battin's recruitment marked the last personnel change to the group for almost three years and as a result, the McGuinn-White-Parsons-Battin lineup became the most stable and longest-lived of any configuration of the Byrds.

The latter-day, post-Sweetheart of the Rodeo version of the band, featuring McGuinn and White's dual lead guitar work, toured relentlessly between 1969 and 1972 and was regarded by critics and audiences as much more accomplished in concert than any previous configuration of the Byrds had been. As a result of this, it was decided in early 1970 that the time was right for the group to issue a live album. It was also felt that the band had a sufficient backlog of new compositions to warrant the recording of a new studio album. It was therefore suggested by Melcher that the band should release a double album, featuring one LP of concert recordings and another LP of new studio material. To help with the editing of the live recordings, the band's ex-manager Jim Dickson, who had been fired by the group in June 1967, was invited back into the Byrds' camp. At around this same time, former business manager Eddie Tickner also returned to the group's employ as a replacement for Larry Spector, who had quit the management business and relocated to Big Sur.

The two-record (Untitled) album was released by the Byrds on September 14, 1970, to positive reviews and strong sales, with many critics and fans regarding the album as a return to form for the band. Peaking at number 40 on the Billboard Top LPs chart and number 11 in the UK, the album's success continued the upward trend in the band's commercial fortunes and popularity that had begun with the release of the Ballad of Easy Rider album. The live half of (Untitled) included both new material and new renditions of previous hit singles, including "Mr. Tambourine Man", "So You Want to Be a Rock 'n' Roll Star" and a 16-minute version of "Eight Miles High", which comprised the whole of one side of the original LP release. Band biographer Johnny Rogan has suggested that the inclusion of these newly recorded live versions of older songs served to forge a spiritual and musical link between the Byrds' current lineup and the original mid-1960s incarnation of the band.

The studio recordings featured on (Untitled) mostly consisted of newly written, self-penned material, including a number of songs that had been composed by McGuinn and Broadway theater impresario Jacques Levy for a planned country rock musical titled Gene Tryp that the pair were developing. Plans for the musical had fallen through and as a result, McGuinn decided to record some of the material originally intended for the production with the Byrds. Among the Gene Tryp songs included on (Untitled) was "Chestnut Mare", which had originally been written for a scene in which the musical's eponymous hero attempts to catch and tame a wild horse. The song was issued as a single in the U.S. on October 23, 1970, but it only managed to climb to number 121 on the Billboard chart. Despite this low chart placing, the song went on to become a staple of FM radio programming in America during the 1970s. "Chestnut Mare" did much better in the UK, when it was released as a single on January 1, 1971, reaching number 19 on the UK Singles Chart and giving the Byrds their first UK Top 20 hit since their cover of Bob Dylan's "All I Really Want to Do" had peaked at number 4 in September 1965.

Kathleen's Song
An excerpt from "Kathleen's Song", highlighting the prominent orchestra and horn overdubs that producer Terry Melcher controversially added to the Byrdmaniax album, allegedly without the Byrds' consent.

The Byrds returned to the recording studio with Melcher sporadically between October 1970 and early March 1971, to complete the follow-up to (Untitled), which would be released in June 1971 as Byrdmaniax. The grueling pace of the band's touring schedule at the time meant that they were not fully prepared for the sessions and much of the material they recorded was under-developed. Following completion of the album recording sessions, the Byrds once again headed out on tour, leaving Melcher and engineer Chris Hinshaw to finish mixing the album in their absence. Controversially, Melcher and Hinshaw elected to bring in arranger Paul Polena to assist in the overdubbing of strings, horns, and a gospel choir onto many of the songs, allegedly without the band's consent. Drummer Gene Parsons recalled in a 1997 interview that when the band heard Melcher's additions they campaigned to have the album remixed and the orchestration removed, but Columbia Records refused, citing budget restrictions, and so the record was duly pressed up and released.

In May 1971, just prior to the release of the Byrdmaniax album, the Byrds undertook a sell-out tour of England and Europe, which included a performance at the Royal Albert Hall in London that was released for the first time in 2008 as Live at Royal Albert Hall 1971. The British and European press were unanimous in their praise of the Byrds' live performances during the tour, reinforcing their reputation as a formidable live act during this period. Over the course of the tour, the band chose to expand their ranks, with roadie Jimmi Seiter joining the group on stage to provide additional percussion as an unofficial member. Seiter would continue to sit in with the Byrds during their live performances until August 1971, when he decided to leave the group's employ.

Terry Melcher put the strings on while we were on the road, we came back and we didn't even recognize it as our own album. It was like somebody else's work. Our instruments were buried.

— Clarence White speaking in 1973 about the production on Byrdmaniax

When the Byrdmaniax album was released on June 23, 1971, it was received poorly by most critics and did much to undermine the new-found popularity that the Byrds had enjoyed since the release of Ballad of Easy Rider. The response to the album from the American music press was particularly scathing, with a review in the August 1971 edition of Rolling Stone magazine describing the Byrds as "a boring dead group" and memorably dismissing the entire album as "increments of pus". The consensus among most reviewers was that Byrdmaniax was hampered by Melcher's inappropriate orchestration and by being an album almost totally bereft of the Byrds' signature sound. The band themselves were publicly critical of the album upon its release, with Gene Parsons referring to it as "Melcher's folly". For his part, Melcher later stated that he felt that the band's performances in the studio during the making of Byrdmaniax were lackluster and he therefore employed the orchestration to cover up the album's musical shortcomings. By the time of the album's release, Melcher had resigned as the Byrds' manager and producer. Despite the band's dissatisfaction with the finished product and its poor critical reception, Byrdmaniax made a respectable showing on the U.S. charts, peaking at number 46, but failed to sell in sufficient quantities to reach the UK charts. Author Christopher Hjort has remarked that in the years since its release, Byrdmaniax has become arguably "the least-liked album in the Byrds catalogue" among the group's fanbase.

The Byrds moved quickly to record a self-produced follow-up to Byrdmaniax, in an attempt to stem the criticism that the album was receiving in the music press and as a reaction to their own dislike of Melcher's overproduction. Rogan has speculated that the Byrds' decision to produce their next album themselves was an attempt on the band's part to prove that they could do a better job than Melcher had done on their previous record. While in England for an appearance at the Lincoln Folk Festival, the Byrds decamped to CBS Studios in London with engineer Mike Ross and between July 22 and 28, 1971, they recorded an album's worth of new material.

In October 1971, CBS Records in the UK issued The Byrds' Greatest Hits Volume II to capitalize on the group's recent appearance at the Lincoln Folk Festival and perhaps as a reaction to the chart failure suffered by Byrdmaniax. The compilation album also failed to reach the UK charts, while contemporary reviews made note of its misleading and inaccurate title, since among its twelve tracks, only "Chestnut Mare" had been a genuine hit in the United Kingdom. An equivalent compilation wasn't released in the U.S. until November 1972, when The Best of The Byrds: Greatest Hits, Volume II was issued.

On November 17, 1971, less than five months after the release of Byrdmaniax, the Byrds issued their eleventh studio album, Farther Along. The album was met with slightly more enthusiastic reviews than its predecessor but only managed to climb to number 152 on the Billboard Top LPs chart, while failing to reach the charts in the United Kingdom altogether. Musically, the album found the Byrds beginning to move away from their country rock sound—although at least half the album still bore a strong country influence—and instead, embrace a style indebted to 1950s rock 'n' roll music. The Skip Battin and Kim Fowley penned song "America's Great National Pastime" was taken from the album and released as a single in late November, but it failed to chart on either side of the Atlantic. Rogan has concluded that the rapidity with which the Byrds planned and recorded Farther Along resulted in an album that was just as flawed as Byrdmaniax and as a result, it failed to rehabilitate the band's ailing commercial fortunes or increase their declining audience. The album's title track, sung by White with the rest of the group harmonizing, would later become a poignant and prophetic epitaph for the guitarist when it was sung by ex-Byrd Gram Parsons and the Eagles' Bernie Leadon at White's funeral in July 1973.

==== Breakup ====
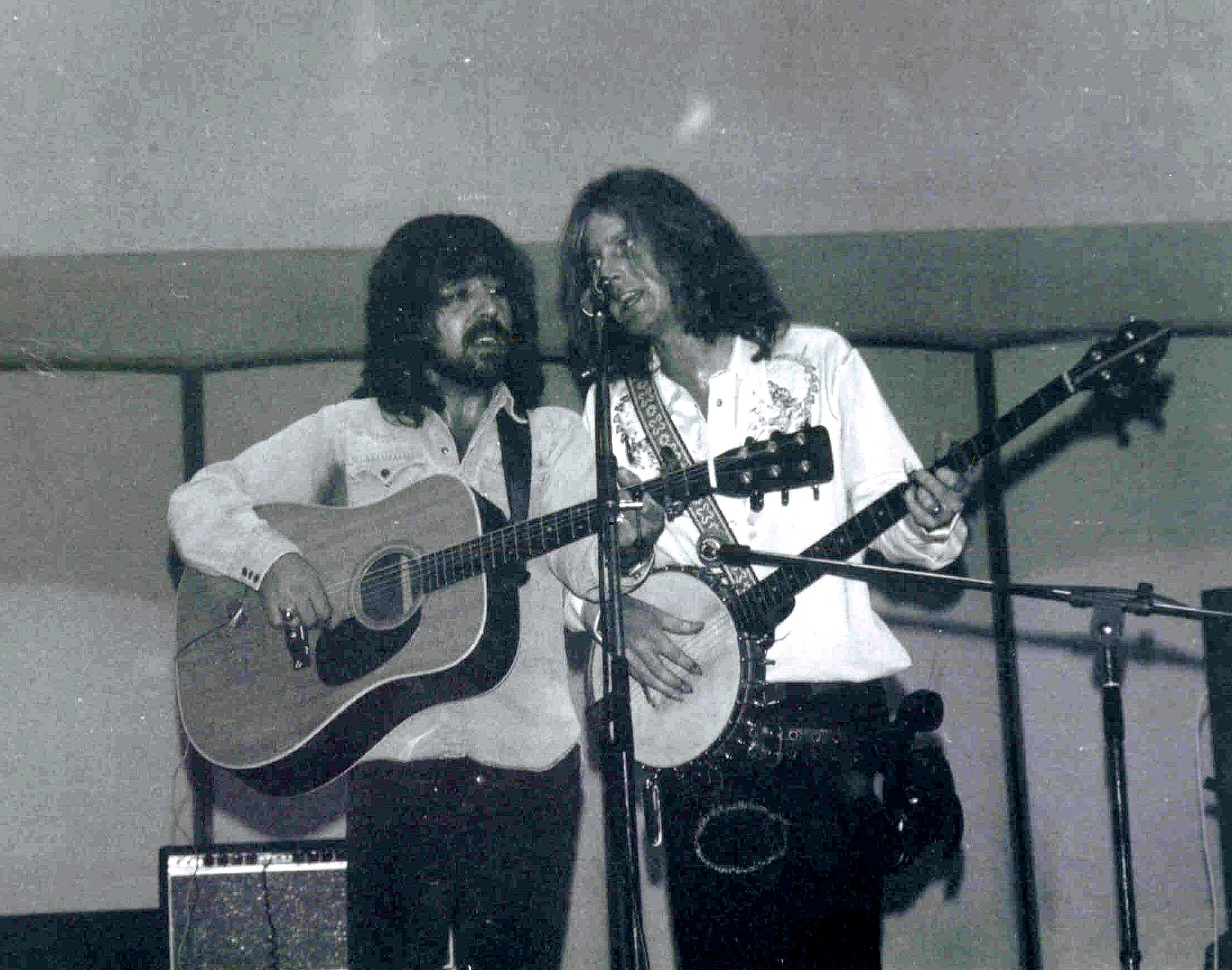
Clarence White and Roger McGuinn on stage during the Byrds' September 9, 1972, appearance at Washington University in St. Louis.

Following the release of Farther Along, the Byrds continued to tour throughout 1972, but no new album or single release was forthcoming. Gene Parsons was fired from the group in July 1972 for a number of reasons, including McGuinn's growing dissatisfaction with his drumming, disagreements that he and McGuinn were having over band members' pay, and his own discontent over the band's lack of morale during this period.

Parsons was quickly replaced with L.A. session drummer John Guerin, who remained with the Byrds until January 1973, when he decided to return to studio work. Although Guerin participated in recording sessions with the band and appeared on stage with them from September 1972, he was never an official member of the Byrds and instead received a standard session musician's wage, while continuing to undertake work for other artists as an in-demand studio player. Three officially released Byrds recordings exist of the McGuinn-White-Battin-Guerin lineup: live versions of "Mr. Tambourine Man" and "Roll Over Beethoven" that were recorded for the soundtrack of the Earl Scruggs' film Banjoman, and a studio recording of "Bag Full of Money" that was included as a bonus track on the remastered reissue of Farther Along in 2000.

Following Guerin's departure, he was temporarily replaced for live performances by session drummers Dennis Dragon and Jim Moon. The band underwent a further personnel change following a show on February 10, 1973, in Ithaca, New York, when Skip Battin was dismissed by McGuinn, who had capriciously decided that the bassist's playing abilities were no longer of a sufficient standard. McGuinn turned to ex-Byrd Chris Hillman – who at that time was a member of the band Manassas – and asked him to step in as Battin's replacement for two upcoming shows on February 23 and 24. Hillman agreed to play both concerts for the sum of $2,000 and also brought in Manassas percussionist Joe Lala to fill the vacant spot behind the drum kit. Following a shambolic, underrehearsed performance at the Capitol Theatre in Passaic, New Jersey, on February 24, 1973, McGuinn canceled the band's remaining concert commitments and disbanded the touring version of the Byrds, to make way for a reunion of the original five-piece lineup of the band.

Five months later, guitarist Clarence White was killed by a drunk driver in the early hours of July 15, 1973, while he loaded guitar equipment into the back of a van after a concert appearance in Palmdale, California.

=== Reunions ===
==== 1972–1973 reunion ====
The five original members of the Byrds reunited briefly during late 1972, while McGuinn was still undertaking selected concerts with the touring version of the group. Discussions regarding a reunion between Roger McGuinn, Gene Clark, David Crosby, Chris Hillman, and Michael Clarke had taken place as early as July 1971, around the same time as the then current lineup of the band were recording the Farther Along album. Plans for a reunion accelerated in mid-1972, when the founder of Asylum Records, David Geffen, offered each of the original band members a sizable amount of money to reform and record an album for his label. The reunion actually took place in early October 1972, beginning with a rehearsal at McGuinn's house, where the group began selecting suitable material for a new album. The five original Byrds booked into Wally Heider's Studio 3 in Hollywood from October 16 until November 15, 1972, recording their first album together in seven years.

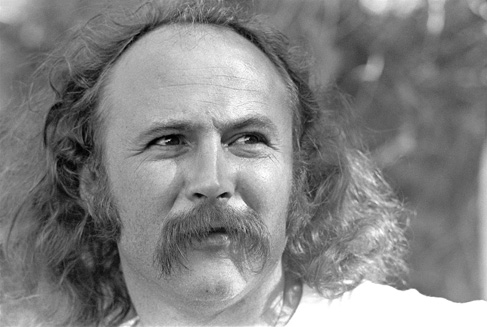
Following his dismissal from the band in 1967, David Crosby (pictured in 1976) was critical of Roger McGuinn's decision to recruit new band members, while continuing to use the Byrds name.

Following completion of the album, Crosby persuaded McGuinn to dissolve the Columbia version of the Byrds, who were still touring at that time. Crosby had long been vocal regarding his displeasure over McGuinn's decision to recruit new band members following his dismissal from the group in 1967, and had stated in a number of interviews that in his opinion "there were only ever five Byrds". In keeping with the new spirit of reconciliation that the reunion fostered, McGuinn permanently disbanded the Columbia lineup of the group in February 1973.

The reunion album, titled simply Byrds, was released on March 7, 1973, to mixed reviews. As a result, a planned tour in support of the album failed to materialize. Among the album's shortcomings, critics made note of a lack of sonic unity and the absence of the Byrds' signature jangly guitar sound. The album managed to climb to number 20 on the Billboard Top LPs & Tape chart and number 31 in the UK. In the United States, the album became the band's highest charting LP of new material since 1965's Turn! Turn! Turn!, which had also been the last Byrds' album to feature Gene Clark as a full member. Among the tracks included on the album were McGuinn's folk-flavored "Sweet Mary", the Joni Mitchell cover "For Free", a re-recording of Crosby's song "Laughing" (which had originally appeared on his 1971 solo album, If I Could Only Remember My Name), and a pair of Neil Young songs. The album also featured the Gene Clark compositions "Changing Heart" and "Full Circle", the latter of which had provided the reunion album with its working title and was subsequently released as a single, although it failed to chart.

The negative critical reception that Byrds received in the music press resulted in the band losing faith in the idea of an ongoing series of reunions. In the years following its release, all five band members were openly critical of the album, with the general consensus being that the material included on it was weak and that the recording sessions had been rushed and ill-thought out. In addition, McGuinn and Hillman have both suggested that with the exception of Gene Clark, the songwriting members of the band were reluctant to bring their strongest compositions to the recording sessions, preferring instead to hold those songs back for their own solo projects. In the wake of the reunion, the five original Byrds quietly returned to their own careers, with the June 1973 release of McGuinn's eponymously titled solo album serving to effectively mark the end of the Byrds.

Following the reunion of 1972/1973, the Byrds remained disbanded throughout the rest of the decade. Roger McGuinn turned his attention to establishing his own career, releasing a series of solo albums between 1973 and 1977, and making a high-profile appearance with Bob Dylan's Rolling Thunder Revue. Chris Hillman worked as part of the Souther–Hillman–Furay Band following the Byrds reunion and released a pair of solo albums entitled Slippin' Away and Clear Sailin' in 1976 and 1977 respectively. David Crosby returned to the supergroup Crosby, Stills, Nash & Young for their 1974 tour and subsequently continued to produce albums with Graham Nash. He also took part in a 1977 reunion of Crosby, Stills & Nash, which saw the group release their multi-platinum selling CSN album. Michael Clarke also found success following the Byrds reunion as the drummer for soft rock group Firefall, while Gene Clark returned to his solo career, producing the critically acclaimed but commercially unsuccessful albums No Other (1974) and Two Sides to Every Story (1977).

==== McGuinn, Clark and Hillman (1977–1981) ====
Between 1977 and 1980, McGuinn, Clark and Hillman worked on and off together as a trio, modeled after Crosby, Stills, Nash & Young and, to a lesser extent, the Eagles. This supergroup made up of former Byrds was reasonably successful commercially and managed to score a Top 40 hit with the single "Don't You Write Her Off" in March 1979. The trio toured internationally and recorded the albums McGuinn, Clark & Hillman and City. Clark departed the group in late 1979, resulting in a third and final album being billed as McGuinn-Hillman. The two former Byrds continued to play low-key gigs after the release of the McGuinn/Hillman album, but they split up in early 1981.

==== Ersatz Byrds and further reunions (1989–1991; 2000) ====
In 1984, Gene Clark approached McGuinn, Crosby, and Hillman in an attempt to reform the Byrds in time for the 20th anniversary of the release of the "Mr. Tambourine Man" single in 1985. None of these three original members was interested in the venture and so Clark instead assembled a group of musicians and friends, including Rick Roberts, Blondie Chaplin, Rick Danko, Richard Manuel, and the ex-Byrds Michael Clarke and John York, under the banner of "The 20th Anniversary Tribute to the Byrds". This tribute act began performing on the lucrative nostalgia circuit in early 1985, but a number of concert promoters began to shorten the band's name to the Byrds in advertisements and promotional material. As the band continued to tour throughout 1985, they eventually decided to shorten their name to the Byrds themselves, prompting McGuinn, Crosby and Hillman to berate the tribute group in interviews, with McGuinn deriding the act as "a cheap show".

After the tour wound down in late 1985, Clark returned to his solo career, leaving Michael Clarke to soldier on with a band that was now billed as "A Tribute to the Byrds" (although again, it was often shortened to the Byrds by promoters). Gene Clark returned to the group following the release of his and Carla Olson's So Rebellious a Lover album, and the tribute band continued to work on and off in 1987 and 1988. Author Johnny Rogan has stated that most die-hard fans of the Byrds were mortified by the existence of this ersatz version of the group, while Byrds expert Tim Connors has commented that "no chapter in the history of the Byrds caused as much consternation and controversy among fans".

In June 1988, McGuinn, Crosby and Hillman appeared at a concert celebrating the reopening of the Ash Grove folk club in Los Angeles. Although they were billed as solo artists, the three musicians came together for an on-stage reunion during the show, performing a string of Byrds hits including "Mr. Tambourine Man" and "Eight Miles High". Although Clark and Clarke's Byrds tribute group was inactive at the time of this high-profile get-together of McGuinn, Crosby, and Hillman, Michael Clarke did mount another tribute tour shortly afterwards, this time featuring former Byrd Skip Battin and newcomers Terry Jones Rogers and Jerry Sorn, under the banner of "the Byrds featuring Michael Clarke". In addition, the drummer also sought to trademark the name the Byrds for his own use.

First Gene went around with a very, very bad band, calling it the Byrds. Well, okay. Gene was one of the original writer/singer guys. But when it gets to be Michael Clarke the drummer -- who never wrote anything or sang anything – going out there with an even worse band, and claiming to be the Byrds ... and they can't play the stuff. It was dragging the name in the dirt.

— David Crosby on the motivation behind the lawsuit against Michael Clarke

In retaliation against Clarke's trademark application, McGuinn, Crosby and Hillman submitted their own counter-claim to gain ownership of the band's name. McGuinn had actually attempted to trademark the Byrds name himself during the 1970s, to prevent its misuse, but his application had been turned down. To strengthen their case, the three musicians announced in December 1988 that they would be performing a series of concerts in January 1989 as the Byrds. Although he was no longer connected with Clarke's tribute act, Gene Clark was not invited to participate in these official Byrds reunion concerts due to residual ill-feeling stemming from his earlier "20th Anniversary Tribute to the Byrds".

The reunion concerts were a resounding success, but with Michael Clarke continuing to tour with his Byrds tribute, McGuinn, Crosby and Hillman filed a lawsuit against the drummer in the spring of 1989, suing him for allegedly false advertising, unfair competition and deceptive trade practices, as well as seeking a preliminary injunction against Clarke's use of the name. At the court hearing in May 1989, the judge denied the injunction, ruling that McGuinn, Crosby and Hillman had failed to show that they would be irreparably damaged by Clarke's actions. As a result, Clarke gained full legal ownership of the name the Byrds. In the wake of this ruling, McGuinn, Crosby and Hillman dropped their lawsuit, but to demonstrate that they had not wholly surrendered the Byrds name to Clarke, the three musicians appeared under the banner of the Original Byrds at a Roy Orbison tribute concert on February 24, 1990, where they were joined on-stage by Bob Dylan for a rendition of "Mr. Tambourine Man". Later that year, McGuinn, Crosby and Hillman entered Treasure Isle Recorders in Nashville to record four new Byrds tracks for inclusion on the forthcoming The Byrds box set.

On January 16, 1991, the five original members of the Byrds put aside their differences to appear together at the Waldorf-Astoria Hotel in New York City for their induction into the Rock and Roll Hall of Fame. The ceremony honored the original lineup of Roger McGuinn, Gene Clark, David Crosby, Chris Hillman, and Michael Clarke, while later configurations of the group featuring such key personnel as Gram Parsons and Clarence White were quietly passed over. The occasion, which saw the band come together on stage to perform the songs "Turn! Turn! Turn! (to Everything There Is a Season)", "Mr. Tambourine Man", and "I'll Feel a Whole Lot Better", represented the first time that all five original Byrds had stood together since 1973. Unfortunately, it would also represent the last time that the five original members were gathered together. Clark died later that year of heart failure, and on December 19, 1993, Clarke succumbed to liver disease brought on by alcoholism.

Following Clarke's death, Terry Jones Rogers resurrected the Byrds tribute act, with guitarist Scott Nienhaus and former Byrds Skip Battin and Gene Parsons on bass and drums respectively. Performing under the banner of the Byrds Celebration, the tribute group toured extensively throughout the remainder of the 1990s, although Parsons was replaced by session drummer Vince Barranco in 1995 and Battin was forced to retire due to ill-health in 1997. Since 2002, Rogers and Nienhaus have continued to tour as part of the band Younger Than Yesterday: A Tribute to the Byrds, along with bassist Michael Curtis and drummer Tim Politte.

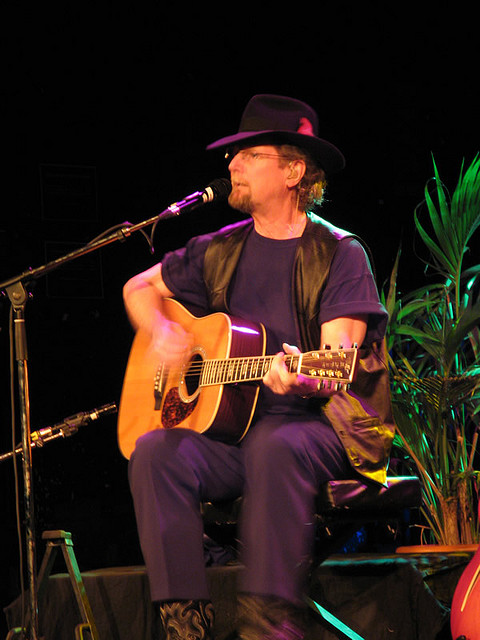
McGuinn performing in 2009. Despite Hillman and Crosby's interest in future Byrds reunions, McGuinn remains reluctant to reform the band.

McGuinn, Crosby and Hillman all returned to their individual solo careers following the Rock and Roll Hall of Fame ceremony. The Byrds did reunite for a third time on August 8, 2000, to give an impromptu, one-off performance at a tribute concert for Fred Walecki, the owner of a Los Angeles music equipment store who was suffering from throat cancer. Crosby and Hillman were booked to appear at the event separately, but McGuinn, who was not listed on the bill, made a surprise appearance and joined his two former partners on stage. McGuinn introduced the hastily reformed trio with the words, "And now, ladies and gentlemen, the Byrds", as the group launched into renditions of "Mr. Tambourine Man" and "Turn! Turn! Turn! (to Everything There Is a Season)". According to contemporary press reports, the reunion was an unmitigated success, with the audience giving the band multiple standing ovations and shouting for more as they left the stage.

During the 2000s, two more ex-members of the Byrds died when drummer Kevin Kelley succumbed of natural causes in 2002 and bassist Skip Battin, who was suffering from Alzheimer's disease, died at his home in 2003. Former members Gene Parsons and John York both remain active and continue to perform and record various musical projects.

Perhaps the most surprising development in the Byrds' story during the 2000s was the acquisition by David Crosby of the rights to the band's name in 2002. Ownership of the Byrds' name had reverted to Clarke's estate upon his death in 1993 and Crosby's purchase served to effectively bring the convoluted battle for control of the group's name to an end.

To date, the Fred Walecki tribute concert appearance in 2000 was the last performance by the Byrds. However, Hillman and Crosby both expressed an interest in working with McGuinn again on Byrds projects, but the lead guitarist and head Byrd remained adamant that he was not interested in another full reunion. During an interview with music journalist John Nork, McGuinn replied "absolutely not", when asked if he had any plans to revive the Byrds, explaining, "No, I don't want to do that. I just want to be a solo artist. The Byrds are well documented. I don't think we need anymore from the Byrds."

In spite of McGuinn's comments, he and Hillman undertook a series of concerts together in 2018 to celebrate the 50th anniversary of the Byrds' Sweetheart of the Rodeo album. Though not billed as the Byrds, the duo, together with backing band Marty Stuart and his Fabulous Superlatives, played some earlier Byrds' material before performing all of the songs from the album and telling stories about its creation. An album of live recordings from the 50th Anniversary concerts was released for Record Store Day 2024.

On January 18, 2023, David Crosby died in his sleep at age 81, following years of health issues. His death left McGuinn and Hillman as the two remaining original members.

== Legacy ==
Since the band's 1960s heyday, the influence of the Byrds on successive generations of rock and pop musicians has grown steadily, with acts such as the Eagles, Big Star, Tom Petty & the Heartbreakers, R.E.M., the Bangles, the Smiths, and innumerable alternative rock bands of the post-punk era all exhibiting signs of their influence. Musician and author Peter Lavezzoli described the Byrds in 2007 as "one of the few bands to exert a decisive influence on the Beatles", while also noting that they helped to persuade Bob Dylan to begin recording with electric instrumentation. Lavezzoli concluded that "like it or not, terms like 'folk rock', 'raga rock' and 'country rock' were coined for a reason: the Byrds did it first, and then kept moving, never staying in the 'raga' or 'country' mode for very long. This is precisely what made the Byrds such a rewarding band to follow from one record to the next".

In their book Beyond and Before: Progressive Rock Since the 1960s, academics Paul Hegarty and Martin Halliwell placed the Byrds among a list of bands that they included in the book "not merely as precursors of prog but as essential developments of progressiveness in its early days". In The Great Rock Discography, music researcher Martin C. Strong describes the Byrds' cover of "Mr. Tambourine Man" as "a timeless slice of hypnotic, bittersweet pop" and a record that "did nothing less than change the course of pop/rock history". Author and musician Bob Stanley, writing in his 2013 book Yeah Yeah Yeah: The Story of Modern Pop, has called the Byrds' music "a phenomenon, a drone, genuinely hair-raising and totally American".

Music historian Domenic Priore attempted to sum up the band's influence in his book Riot on Sunset Strip: Rock 'n' Roll's Last Stand in 60s Hollywood, by stating: "Few of The Byrds' contemporaries can claim to have made such a subversive impact on popular culture. The band had a much larger, more positive impact on the world at large than any Billboard chart position or album sales or concert attendance figure could possibly measure."

In 2004, Rolling Stone magazine ranked the Byrds at number 45 on their list of the 100 Greatest Artists of All Time. In 2006, they were inducted into the Vocal Group Hall of Fame.

== Members ==
Original members

- Roger McGuinn – lead guitar, banjo, Moog synthesizer, vocals (1964–1973, 1989–1991, 2000)
- Gene Clark – tambourine, rhythm guitar, harmonica, vocals (1964–1966, 1967, 1972–1973, 1991; died 1991)
- David Crosby – rhythm guitar, vocals (1964–1967, 1972–1973, 1989–1991, 2000; died 2023)
- Michael Clarke – drums (1964–1967, 1972–1973, 1991; died 1993)
- Chris Hillman – bass guitar, rhythm guitar, mandolin, vocals (1964–1968, 1972–1973, 1989–1991, 2000)

Subsequent members

- Kevin Kelley – drums (1968; died 2002)
- Gram Parsons – rhythm guitar, piano, organ, vocals (1968; died 1973)
- Clarence White – lead guitar, mandolin, vocals (1968–1973; died 1973)
- Gene Parsons – drums, banjo, harmonica, pedal steel guitar, rhythm guitar, vocals (1968–1972)
- John York – bass guitar, vocals (1968–1969)
- Skip Battin – bass guitar, piano, vocals (1969–1973; died 2003)

Membership timeline (1964–1973)

== Discography ==
- Mr. Tambourine Man (1965)
- Turn! Turn! Turn! (1965)
- Fifth Dimension (1966)
- Younger Than Yesterday (1967)
- The Notorious Byrd Brothers (1968)
- Sweetheart of the Rodeo (1968)
- Dr. Byrds & Mr. Hyde (1969)
- Ballad of Easy Rider (1969)
- (Untitled) (1970)
- Byrdmaniax (1971)
- Farther Along (1971)
- Byrds (1973)
