= Byrds (album) =

Studio album by the Byrds
- Released: March 7, 1973
- Recorded: October 16 – November 15, 1972
- Studios: Wally Heider's Studio 3, Hollywood
- Genres: Rock; country rock
- Length: 34:54
- Label: Asylum
- Producer: David Crosby

The Byrds chronology
The Best of The Byrds: Greatest Hits, Volume II (1972)	Byrds (1973)	History of The Byrds (1973)

Singles from Byrds
- 1. "Full Circle" Released: April 11, 1973; 2. "Things Will Be Better" Released: April 24, 1973; 3. "Cowgirl in the Sand" Released: June 1973; 4. "Full Circle" Released: August 8, 1975

Byrds is the twelfth and final studio album by the American rock band the Byrds and was released in March 1973 on Asylum Records. It was recorded as the centerpiece of a reunion among the five original band members: Roger McGuinn, Gene Clark, David Crosby, Chris Hillman, and Michael Clarke. The last time that all five members had worked together as the Byrds was in 1966, prior to Clark's departure from the band. During the reunion, the current, latter-day lineup of the band continued to make live appearances until February 1973, with McGuinn being the only member common to both versions of the group.

Upon its release, Byrds received generally poor reviews, with many critics bemoaning a lack of sonic unity and the absence of the Byrds' signature jangly guitar sound among the album's shortcomings. Nonetheless, the album reached number 20 on the Billboard Top LPs & Tape chart and was also moderately successful in the United Kingdom, where it reached number 31. In the U.S., Byrds was the band's highest charting album of new material since 1965's Turn! Turn! Turn!, which had also been the last Byrds' album to feature Clark as a full member. Three of the album's songs, "Full Circle", "Things Will Be Better", and "Cowgirl in the Sand", were released as singles during 1973, but none of these releases became hits.

== Background ==
By 1972, the Byrds' guitarist and leader, Roger McGuinn, had grown dissatisfied with the current version of the group. As the only member to have remained consistent since the band's inception in 1964, McGuinn had steered the Byrds through an array of lineup changes during the late 1960s. The band's membership had finally stabilized in 1970, but by early 1972 dissension was brewing due to disagreements over band members' pay. As a result of this, Gene Parsons (the band's drummer since 1968) was fired by McGuinn in July 1972 and replaced by session musician John Guerin. The Byrds continued to tour and record sporadically throughout 1972, but no new single or album was forthcoming.

Concurrently, the four ex-members of the Byrds who, along with McGuinn, had comprised the original mid-1960s lineup of the band, were, to an extent, at loose ends: David Crosby had completed his recording and touring obligations for the Graham Nash/David Crosby album; Chris Hillman's work with the Stephen Stills-helmed band Manassas was paused while the band were on hiatus; Gene Clark's critically lauded but financially unrewarding solo career was in need of a boost; and Michael Clarke had been without a band since the break up of the Flying Burrito Brothers in 1971. Furthermore, none of the five original band members' careers—with the exception of Crosby's—had been as financially rewarding as during The Byrds' mid-1960s heyday.

Tentative discussions between the five original members of the band, regarding a possible reunion, had taken place as early as July 1971, around the time that the then current lineup of the Byrds were recording their final album, Farther Along. News of these discussions was leaked to the British music press, and in late January 1972, one week after the UK release of Farther Along, the front page of Disc and Music Echo featured the headline, "Original Byrds To Reform?" The attendant article suggested that the reunion album would be a one-off project and that the current lineup of the Byrds would continue to tour and record, with no question of disbanding.

Meanwhile, with the successful supergroup Crosby, Stills, Nash & Young on indefinite hiatus, while the individual members worked on other projects, managers David Geffen and Elliot Roberts had seen their attempts to bring a new CSNY album to the marketplace thwarted. In the absence of any new Crosby, Stills, Nash & Young product, Geffen became acutely aware that a historic reunion of the original Byrds could prove to be highly lucrative for all concerned. Thus, in mid-1972, Geffen weighed in with a substantial offer to the five original members to record a reunion album for his Asylum label.

The reunion actually took place in early October 1972, beginning with a rehearsal at McGuinn's house, where the band initially worked on one of the guitarist's new songs. Significantly, the group played none of their old material during this first rehearsal, but instead concentrated on selecting suitable songs for a new project. All five musicians were encouraged by the rehearsal and felt sure that they could recreate the magic of the Byrds' golden era. Consequently, they agreed to commence the recording of their first album together in seven years, with the last time that all five had worked together as the Byrds being early 1966, prior to Gene Clark's departure from the band.

However, the reunited group were determined that the internal conflict that tore them apart during the 1960s would not be allowed to rear its head again. It was therefore agreed that they would not be a band in the traditional sense, but rather a loose arrangement of solo artists, akin to the modus operandi of Crosby, Stills, Nash & Young. With considerable leverage from Geffen, McGuinn managed to secure permission from Columbia Records—to which he was still contracted—to record a one-off album for the Asylum label. As part of the deal, Clive Davis, the president of Columbia Records, specified that McGuinn and Crosby would be required to record a joint album together for Columbia, which was to be released in 1973. However, this planned Crosby/McGuinn album failed to materialize, due to Davis being fired from Columbia shortly after the exchange deal was struck. While the original quintet prepared to record the reunion album, the existing Columbia lineup of the Byrds, featuring McGuinn, Clarence White, Skip Battin, and John Guerin, continued to make concert appearances in the United States.

== Recording ==
Recording sessions for the reunion album began on October 16, 1972 in room #4 of Wally Heider's Studio 3 recording facility in Los Angeles and continued until at least November 15, 1972. During these sessions, the band recorded all eleven of the songs that would appear on the finished album and at least two outtakes: the McGuinn and Jacques Levy penned "My New Woman" and the traditional folk song "Fair and Tender Ladies".

In 2009, a cache of multitrack tapes dating from the Byrds' reunion sessions and featuring a number of alternate versions and at least one outtake were discovered. The tapes include work-in-progress versions and alternate takes of the songs "Laughing", "(See the Sky) About to Rain", and "Long Live the King" (listed on the tape box under its working title of "The King Is Dead"). In addition, the tapes also contained three different versions of the traditional song "Fair and Tender Ladies". Reportedly, one of these versions of the song features Crosby singing lead vocals, while the other two feature Clark. Also included among the recordings is a track with the title "The Circle Song", but it is not known whether this refers to the Clark penned "Full Circle" or to another previously undocumented outtake—perhaps a cover of Joni Mitchell's "The Circle Game"? Although it was not included on the reunion album, the Byrds' recording of McGuinn and Levy's "My New Woman" was later released on the guitarist's 1973 solo album, Roger McGuinn.

Following completion of the album's recording sessions, Crosby reached an agreement with McGuinn to dissolve the latter-day lineup of the Byrds, who were at that time still working as a touring band. Crosby had long been vocal about his displeasure over McGuinn's decision to recruit new members following his dismissal from the band in 1967 and had publicly stated his opinion that, "there were only ever five Byrds." In the new spirit of reconciliation fostered by the reunion, and as a result of his own growing dissatisfaction with the current incarnation of the band, McGuinn acquiesced and permanently disbanded the latter-day lineup of the Byrds in February 1973.

The tracks that would make up the finished album included two from each of the four songwriters in the band, as well as a Joni Mitchell cover and two songs written by Neil Young. At the time of the album's release, much was made in the music press over the lack of any Bob Dylan songs, since the Byrds had covered Dylan's material frequently during the 1960s. This criticism prompted Crosby to contend that Young was the great songwriter of the 1970s, just as Dylan had been for the 1960s, and therefore it was entirely appropriate that the Byrds should be covering Young, rather than Dylan.

== Music ==
Full Circle
An excerpt from the Gene Clark penned song "Full Circle", which for a time provided the reunion album with its working title.

The opening track on the album, Clark's "Full Circle", had initially given the album its working title, but Clark was concerned that the public might mistakenly assume that the song had been written specifically for the Byrds' reunion. As the band's biographer Johnny Rogan has remarked, the song's wheel of fortune motif certainly seemed applicable, but the song actually predated the reunion, as Clark explained during a 1979 interview: "I'd already recorded that song a couple of years earlier and it wasn't really written about anything specific. It was just an idea I had." Not only had the song been written by Clark prior to the Byrds' reunion, but by the time that Byrds was released, it had also recently been issued under the alternate title of "Full Circle Song" on Clark's Roadmaster album.

A second Clark original included on Byrds was "Changing Heart", a meditation on the pitfalls of stardom. Clark was also featured singing lead vocals on the album's pair of Neil Young covers. The decision to cover Young's "Cowgirl in the Sand" and "(See the Sky) About to Rain" was made by Clark, who had long admired the Canadian singer–songwriter, and not by Young's CSNY bandmate David Crosby, as was assumed by the press. Rogan has described "Cowgirl in the Sand" as making striking use of the band's crystal clear harmonies, while Clark's harmonica playing lends the song a distinctive country flavor, in keeping with the song's subject matter. "(See the Sky) About to Rain", on the other hand, featured mandolin playing from the band's bassist Chris Hillman and climaxed with a chiming finalé, featuring the Byrds' signature jangling Rickenbacker guitars. The Byrds' version of "(See the Sky) About to Rain" was released over a year before it appeared on Young's 1974 album On the Beach.

"Sweet Mary", co-written by McGuinn and Jacques Levy, saw the Byrds' lead guitarist reverting to a folkier style of songwriting than he had exhibited of late, with Hillman again contributing some prominent mandolin to the song. McGuinn's other songwriting contribution to Byrds was "Born to Rock 'n' Roll", a semi-serious, autobiographical contemplation of the guitarist's career as a professional musician. The song had initially been recorded by the latter-day lineup of the Byrds in July 1972 for possible release as a single, but ultimately that version had been shelved and remained unreleased at the time. McGuinn decided to make another attempt at producing a definitive recording of the song during the reunion sessions, resulting in a rendition that the guitarist himself was dissatisfied with. McGuinn would later record the song for a third time on his 1975 solo album Roger McGuinn & Band, but yet again he was unhappy with the end result, leading him pointedly to conclude in a later interview that "'Born to Rock 'n' Roll' was a dog."

Hillman contributed two songs to the album, both co-authored with ex-Manassas bandmates: "Things Will Be Better", co-written with drummer Dallas Taylor, and "Borrowing Time", co-written with percussionist Joe Lala. The former song deals with the unpredictable nature of fame and stardom, a theme that was echoed in Clark's "Full Circle" and "Changing Heart".

Crosby contributed the song "Long Live the King", a cynical commentary on the star-making mechanics of the music business, which Byrds expert Tim Connors has described as ironic, since it was precisely those same materialistic business practices that had enabled The Byrds' reunion to transpire in the first place. Crosby also chose to revisit the song "Laughing", which had already been released on his first solo album, If I Could Only Remember My Name, in 1971. Crosby's rationale for re-recording the song was that he had originally written "Laughing" during his last days as a member of the Byrds in 1967; as such, it had initially been intended for inclusion on a Byrds album. The version of "Laughing" featured on Byrds saw the return of McGuinn's raga rock style of guitar playing, which had last been utilized on the band's Fifth Dimension and Younger Than Yesterday albums. Crosby also sang the lead vocal on the album's Joni Mitchell cover, "For Free".

== Release and reception ==
Professional ratings
Review scores
Source	Rating
AllMusic	2.5/5 stars
Robert Christgau	C
Rolling Stone	(unfavorable)

Byrds was released on March 7, 1973 in the United States (catalogue item SD 5058) and March 24, 1973 in the United Kingdom (catalogue item SYLA 8754). Although the album was issued in stereo commercially, there are mono promo copies of the LP known to exist. The album's sleeve was adorned with photographs taken by Henry Diltz, which fittingly pictured the band in the L.A. folk club The Troubadour, where McGuinn, Clark, and Crosby had first formed the nucleus of the Byrds in 1964.

The album peaked at number 20 on the Billboard Top LPs & Tape chart, during a chart stay of seventeen weeks, making it the band's highest charting album of new material in the U.S. since 1965's Turn! Turn! Turn! album. In the UK, the album reached number 31, but only remained on the UK Albums Chart for one week. A total of four singles were taken from the album, beginning with "Full Circle" b/w "Long Live the King", which was released on April 11, 1973 and which reached number 109 on the Billboard chart. Two further singles taken from the album during 1973—"Things Will Be Better" b/w "For Free" (which was issued exclusively in the UK and Europe), and "Cowgirl in the Sand" b/w "Long Live the King"—failed to chart. Finally, a fourth single, "Full Circle" b/w "Things Will Be Better", was released in the UK in August 1975, almost two and a half years after the album had first appeared, but this too failed to reach the charts.

Upon its release, the album suffered from generally poor reviews, with Jon Landau, in an April 1973 edition of Rolling Stone magazine, criticizing it as "one of the dullest albums of the year." Landau went on to note the disunity evident on the album: "It is a different band for each of the four lead singers and while they make complementary music, it is never a continuous piece, which is what the Byrds were once all about." Reviewing the album in Creem, Robert Christgau gave it a "C" and faulted Crosby for this "country-rock supersession", performed by "a bunch of stars fabricating a paper reconciliation" rather than a "a group, committed however fractiously to a coherent collective identity". In fact, the consensus of most reviewers was that there was a lack of unity throughout the album and that the band's trademark jingle-jangle guitar sound was largely absent from the record. However, there were some positive reviews of the album, with Danny Halloway enthusiastically praising it in the March 31, 1973 edition of the NME: "The Byrds have overcome the novelty of reforming and really do cut it here. The band's direction is no-nonsense, straight-ahead music. There's not any cultural preaching or sloppy outtakes as intros ... I'm glad to report that The Byrds make it on the strength of the music alone."

== Post-release ==
The largely unenthusiastic press reaction to the album caused the individual members of the band to lose faith in the concept of an ongoing, periodic series of band reunions and ultimately, all five members returned to their own careers following the album's release. In the following years, the band themselves would echo many of the sentiments expressed by the music press, with the general consensus being that the recording of the album was rushed and ill-thought out. Clark offered his thoughts on the album during a 1977 interview: "I am disappointed in that album. Some of the harsh criticism is unjust, because, if you listen to it carefully, the album isn't that bad, but it just hasn't got the punch that it could have had if we'd taken the time." Hillman concurred with Clark, telling the Byrds' biographer Johnny Rogan, "In all honesty, we didn't have enough time on the album. They gave us one-and-a-half months to do that album, expecting guys to regroup after a five to six year absence." Hillman also cited the band's eagerness to avoid conflict as a contributing factor to the album's artistic failure: "everybody was so afraid of stepping on the other person's feet because of the tension that had gone down six years prior to that, that it became a bland album. Everybody was being too nice to each other." McGuinn blamed the reunion album's lack of success, at least partly, on the hedonism exhibited by members of the band during the recording process: "David had this incredibly strong pot. Half a joint and you couldn't do anything. We were stoned out of our minds the whole time. I don't remember much recording."

In addition, author John Einarson has suggested that none of the parties—save for perhaps Clark—seemed willing to contribute their best material to the album, instead holding back their finest songs for their own individual solo projects. This has been confirmed by Hillman, who told Einarson, "I'll be honest, I contributed my worst material because I was getting ready to do a solo record, Slipping Away, and I was saving all my good stuff and contributed this throwaway stuff that was awful. Crosby's stuff was sketchy and Roger had 'Born To Rock & Roll', which was terrible, yuck." McGuinn also supported the suggestion that some band members had held back their best material, although he added, "I don't think I was guilty of that. I gave them my best stuff at the time."

The timing of the album, between Crosby, Stills, Nash & Young reunions, the fact that it was produced by Crosby, and the presence of the individual band members' names on the album cover has led to the suggestion that the album was intended as something of a substitute for CSNY. For his part, Crosby's motivation for taking over production duties on the album may have been an attempt finally to exert dominance over the rest of the band, as he had tried to do during his earlier tenure with the Byrds. McGuinn certainly supported this viewpoint, as he revealed in a 1977 interview: "Crosby was calling the shots. It was his coup d'état. He wanted to minimize my importance in the group, and maximize his, and other people's." Both McGuinn and Hillman were actively touring between recording sessions for the album, the former with the Columbia version of the Byrds and the latter with Manassas. With only sporadic availability of two of the band's four creative parties, the brunt of assembling the album was left to the otherwise unengaged Crosby and Clark, which could account for the preponderance of Clark vocals and the CSNY-esque production on the album.

Byrds has been reissued on CD a number of times: first by Elektra Records in 1990; then again in 1998 by WEA; then in 2004 as a remastered edition on Wounded Bird Records; and again by Rhino Records in 2005 and 2008. Most recently, the album has been reissued by Raven Records in 2014, with the addition of two previously released bonus tracks, both recorded by Clark in 1971 and featuring all five members of the Byrds.

== Track listing ==
Side one
No.	Title	Writer(s)	Lead vocals	Length
1.	"Full Circle"	Gene Clark	Clark	2:43
2.	"Sweet Mary"	Roger McGuinn, Jacques Levy	McGuinn	2:55
3.	"Changing Heart"	Gene Clark	Clark	2:42
4.	"For Free"	Joni Mitchell	Crosby	3:50
5.	"Born to Rock 'n' Roll"	Roger McGuinn	McGuinn	3:12

Side two
No.	Title	Writer(s)	Lead vocals	Length
1.	"Things Will Be Better"	Chris Hillman, Dallas Taylor	Hillman	2:13
2.	"Cowgirl in the Sand"	Neil Young	Clark	3:24
3.	"Long Live the King"	David Crosby	Crosby	2:17
4.	"Borrowing Time"	Chris Hillman, Joe Lala	Hillman	2:00
5.	"Laughing"	David Crosby	Crosby	5:38
6.	"(See the Sky) About to Rain"	Neil Young	Clark	3:49

2014 bonus tracks
No.	Title	Writer(s)	Lead vocals	Length
12.	"She's the Kind of Girl"	Gene Clark	Clark	3:00
13.	"One in a Hundred"	Gene Clark	Clark	2:45

== Singles ==
1. "Full Circle" b/w "Long Live the King" (Asylum 11016) April 11, 1973 (US #109)
2. "Things Will Be Better" b/w "For Free" (AYM 516) April 24, 1973
3. "Cowgirl in the Sand" b/w "Long Live the King" (Asylum 11019) June 1973
4. "Full Circle" b/w "Things Will Be Better" (AYM 545) August 8, 1975

== Personnel ==
Adapted from the books So You Want to Be a Rock 'n' Roll Star: The Byrds Day-By-Day, The Byrds: Timeless Flight Revisited and the album liner notes.

The Byrds

- Roger McGuinn – guitar, banjo, Moog synthesizer, vocals
- Gene Clark – guitar, harmonica, tambourine, vocals
- David Crosby – guitar, vocals
- Chris Hillman – electric bass, guitar, mandolin, vocals
- Michael Clarke – drums, congas, percussion

Additional personnel

- Wilton Felder – electric bass on "Cowgirl in the Sand"
- Johnny Barbata – drums on "Cowgirl in the Sand"
- Dallas Taylor – congas, tambourine

== Charts ==
Chart (1973)	Peak position
US Billboard Top LPs	20
UK Album Charts	31
Canadian RPM 100 Albums	19
Dutch MegaCharts Albums	6
US Cash Box Top 100 Albums	18
US Record World Album Chart	14

== Release history ==
Date	Label	Format	Country	Catalog	Notes
March 7, 1973	Asylum	LP	US	SD 5058	Original release.
March 24, 1973	Asylum	LP	UK	SYLA 8754	Original release.
1974	Warner Bros.	LP	Japan	P-8509Y	
1990	Elektra	CD	US	7599 60955	Original CD release.
1998	WEA	CD	UK	60955	
2004	Wounded Bird	CD	US	5058	Digitally remastered reissue of the album.
2008	Rhino	CD	US	8122 799075	
2014	Raven	CD	Australia	RVCD-381	Digitally remastered reissue with two previously released bonus tracks.

== Bibliography ==
- Rogan, Johnny, The Byrds: Timeless Flight Revisited, Rogan House, 1998, ISBN 0-9529540-1-X
- Hjort, Christopher, So You Want to Be a Rock 'n' Roll Star: The Byrds Day-By-Day (1965–1973), Jawbone Press, 2008, ISBN 1-906002-15-0.
- Einarson, John, Mr. Tambourine Man: The Life and Legacy of the Byrds' Gene Clark, Backbeat Books, ISBN 0-87930-793-5.
