= Full Circle Song =

Song written by Gene Clark

Song by Gene Clark

from the album Roadmaster
- Released: January 1973
- Recorded: April 1972
- Studio: Wally Heider, Los Angeles
- Genre: Rock, country rock
- Length: 2:44
- Label: A&M
- Songwriter(s): Gene Clark
- Producer(s): Chris Hinshaw

"Full Circle Song" (also titled "Full Circle") is a country rock-style song written by Gene Clark. For the lyrics, he used an allegorical wheel of fortune motif to comment on the unpredictable nature of fame and fortune. Recorded in Los Angeles in 1972, the song was originally released on Clark's Roadmaster, which was only issued in the Netherlands in January 1973.

Clark, with his former group the Byrds, re-recorded the song as "Full Circle" for the 1973 reunion album, Byrds.

== Original song ==
According to biographer John Einarson, "Full Circle Song" was written by Clark in early 1972. Critic Matthew Greenwald commented that, although it is hard not to believe that the song is an autobiographical commentary on Clark's own critically lauded, but financially unrewarding solo career, Clark himself always denied that this had been his intention.

Clark first recorded the song in April 1972 at Wally Heider Studios in Los Angeles, as part of the recording sessions for Clark's second solo album for A&M Records. For these sessions, Clark and record producer Chris Hinshaw assembled a top flight crew of L.A. studio musicians, including Sneaky Pete Kleinow, Clarence White, Byron Berline, and Spooner Oldham, but progress on the proposed album was slow. The recording sessions were eventually abandoned, due to A&M's frustration at the lack of progress, and consequently the album was shelved.

Some months later, Clark's friend and former Byrds manager, Jim Dickson, approached Dave Hubert, the head of A&M's foreign markets division, regarding a possible European release for the eight tracks completed during the abandoned sessions. Despite protests from some A&M executives, these tracks were compiled with three other previously unreleased Clark songs and issued in the Netherlands as the Roadmaster album.

== The Byrds version ==
"Full Circle"
- 1973 German picture sleeve

Single by the Byrds

from the album Byrds
- B-side: "Long Live the King"
- Released: April 11, 1973
- Recorded: October 16 – November 15, 1972
- Studio: Wally Heider, Los Angeles
- Genre: Rock, country rock
- Length: 2:43
- Label: Asylum
- Songwriter(s): Gene Clark
- Producer(s): David Crosby

The Byrds singles chronology
"America's Great National Pastime" (1971)	"Full Circle" (1973)	"Things Will Be Better" (1973)

In late 1972, prior to the Dutch release of Roadmaster, Clark decided to re-record "Full Circle Song" for inclusion on the Byrds' reunion album, since, at that time, the song was gathering dust in the A&M tape vaults. During the reunion recording sessions, the song was renamed "Full Circle" and, for a time, it provided the album's working title. Ultimately, the album would be released with the eponymous title Byrds, as Clark was uncomfortable with his song being used as the title track in case the public mistakenly assumed that it had been written specifically for the reunion. Clark confirmed that this was not the case during a 1979 interview with Byrds' biographer, Johnny Rogan: "I'd already recorded that song a couple of years earlier [sic] and it wasn't really written about anything specific. It was just an idea I had."

The Byrds' recording of the song is similar in feel to the Roadmaster version, with Rogan commenting on the addition of a soaring David Crosby harmony vocal, while Byrds expert Tim Connors described it as "a strong country rocker" highlighted by mandolin playing from the Byrds' bassist, Chris Hillman.

Record World said that it "fulfills all expectations of the tasty, tuneful singles for which quintet is famous" and has "terrific production by David Crosby."

Following the release of the reunion album, "Full Circle" was issued as a single on April 11, 1973, with "Long Live the King" as the B-side. The single failed to reach the Billboard Hot 100, but it appeared at number 109 on the magazine's Bubbling Under Hot 100 Singles chart; it missed the UK Singles Chart altogether. On August 8, 1975, in the UK the song was re-released as a single, but again, it failed to chart.

== Cover versions ==
"Full Circle" has been covered by a number of artists, including Dan Fogelberg, for his 2003 album, Full Circle, and George Elliott, on his Men Don't Smoke album. Joe Algeri has also covered it on his The Stockholm Years album and on the various artists tribute album, Full Circle: A Tribute to Gene Clark. In addition, "Full Circle" was recorded by Walter Clevenger for the 2007 Byrds' tribute album, Timeless Flyte: A Tribute to the Byrds — Full Circle.

== Sources ==
- Ballard, Barry (1986). Roadmaster (Reissue CD liner notes). Gene Clark. Edsel Records. ED CD 198.
- Brown, Tony (2000). The Complete Book of the British Charts. Omnibus Press. ISBN 0-7119-7670-8.
- Einarson, John (2005). Mr. Tambourine Man: The Life and Legacy of the Byrds' Gene Clark. Backbeat Books. ISBN 0-87930-793-5.
- Hjort, Christopher (2008). So You Want To Be A Rock 'n' Roll Star: The Byrds Day-By-Day (1965-1973). Jawbone Press. ISBN 978-1-906002-15-2.
- Rogan, Johnny (1998). The Byrds: Timeless Flight Revisited (2nd ed.). Rogan House. ISBN 0-9529540-1-X.
