= Rock concert =

Musical performance in any of various genres inspired by rock and roll music

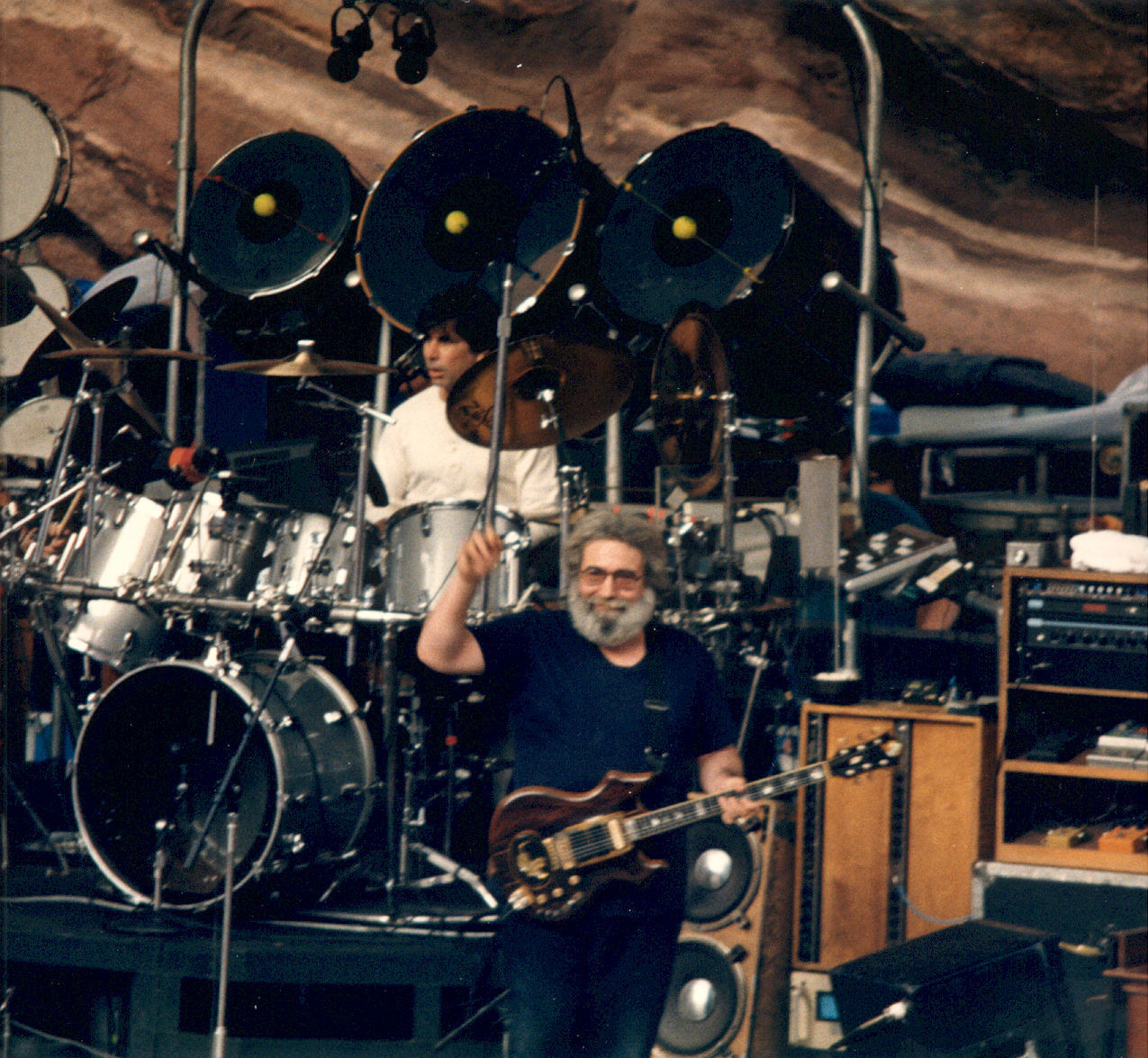
Members of the Grateful Dead perform at Red Rocks Amphitheatre in Colorado on August 11, 1987.

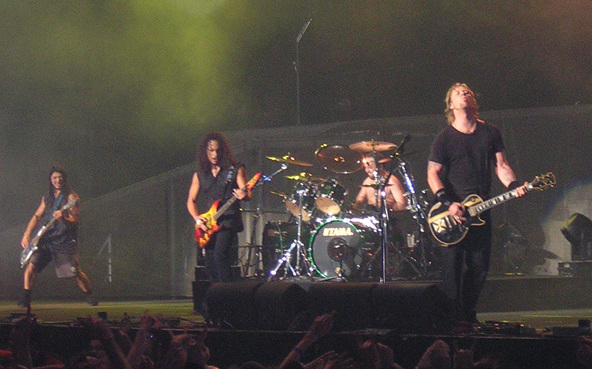
Metallica while performing in London, December 19, 2003.

A rock concert is a performance of rock music.

During the 1950s, several American musical groups experimented with new musical forms that fused country music, blues, and swing genre to produce the earliest examples of "rock and roll." The coining of the phrase, "rock and roll," is often attributed to American, Alan Freed, a disk jockey and concert promoter who organized many of the first major rock concerts. Since then, the rock concert has become a staple of entertainment not only in the United States, but around the world.

Bill Graham is widely credited with setting the format and standards for modern rock concerts. He introduced advance ticketing (and later computerized, online tickets), introduced modern security measures (a reaction to the deaths at the Altamont concert) and had clean toilets and safe conditions in large venues.

Rock concerts are often associated with certain kinds of behavior. Dancing, shouting, singing along with the band, and ostentatious displays by the musicians are common, though some very successful rock bands have avoided gratuitous flash in favor of understated performances focusing on the music itself. Even so, rock concerts often have a playful atmosphere both for the band and the audience.

Like rock music in general, rock concerts are emblematic of American culture's waning formality. Such concerts were crucial to the formation of youth identity in the U.S. during a time of social revolution, and have continued to represent elements of society frequently seen as "rebellious," especially against the strictures of mid-twentieth-century social normativities. One of the best-known rock concerts was undoubtedly Woodstock, and millions of much smaller rock concerts go on every year.

The largest rock concert in history was the one Rod Stewart gave on New Year's Eve 1993-94 on Copacabana Beach in Rio de Janeiro. It was estimated that 4.2 million people attended it, although this figure is believed to include those who turned up solely for the fireworks display at midnight.

== Health concerns ==
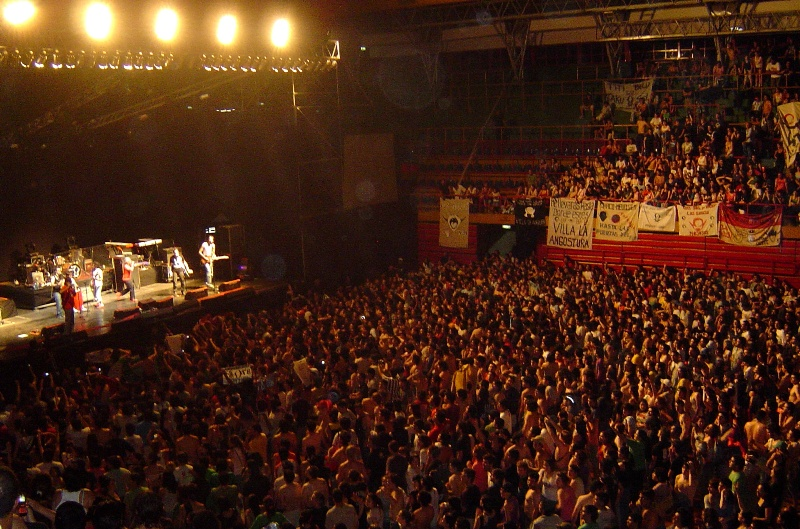
Inside view of Ruca Che arena in Neuquén, Argentina, during a rock concert.

Rock concerts are often performed at very high decibel levels. Prolonged exposure to noise at these levels can permanently damage the bones of the middle ear and the nerves of the inner ear. Thus health officials recommend that concertgoers use earplugs. Since the 1960s, many musicians have worn earplugs at concerts, and some concert promoters actually give out free earplugs.

For concerts that are held in venues not specifically designed for such events, the large amounts of electricity required for operating the amplifiers, lights, and other pieces of concert equipment are typically provided by portable diesel-powered generators – "gensets" – which are often located very close to the event. The widespread use of such generators is common both for indoor events (such as in a large arena or roofed stadium) or outdoor events (e.g. a stadium or an open area with a temporary stage). Regardless of exactly where the gensets are placed, these units emit carcinogenic ultrafine particulates (UFPs) and other pollutants directly into the ambient air. Unless specific precautions are taken, such as placing the gensets very far away and using extra-long connection cables or installing extremely long power-operated exhaust ducts, and/or using wet scrubbers, while also taking into account ambient air currents, winds, and other local factors, the genset emissions are likely to become mixed into the air that is inhaled by concert attendees as well as the musicians and staff and other individuals in the area. Using non-diesel-based alternative power provisions, for example connecting the event equipment directly to the power grid, or using solar panels (along with storage batteries), can enable the entire event to bypass the ambient air quality concerns.

== See also ==
- Rock festival
