= Born to Rock and Roll =

Compilation album by Roger McGuinn
- Released: August 1991
- Recorded: 1973–1976
- Genre: Rock
- Length: 69:42
- Label: Columbia

Roger McGuinn chronology
| Back from Rio (1991) | Born to Rock and Roll (1991) | Live from Mars (1996) |

Professional ratings
Review scores
| Source | Rating |
|---|---|
| Allmusic | 4.5/5 stars |

Born to Rock and Roll is a compilation album by the ex-Byrds frontman Roger McGuinn, released on Columbia Records in August 1991. It was issued following the success of McGuinn's comeback solo album Back from Rio earlier that same year. Born to Rock and Roll contains songs from all five of McGuinn's solo albums of the 1970s, released after the final breakup of The Byrds in 1973. It was the first time that material from these albums had been released on Compact Disc.

== Track listing ==
All tracks composed by Roger McGuinn and Jacques Levy except where otherwise noted.

1. "I'm So Restless" – 3:07
2. "My New Woman" – 2:36
3. "Draggin'" – 3:38
4. "The Water is Wide" (Traditional; arranged by Roger McGuinn) – 3:07
  Tracks 1–4 were originally released on Roger McGuinn (1973).
5. "Same Old Sound" – 3:29
  Track 5 was originally released on Peace on You (1974).
6. "Bag Full of Money" – 2:37
  Track 6 was originally released on Roger McGuinn (1973).
7. "Gate of Horn" – 2:13
8. "Peace On You" (Charlie Rich) – 4:04
  Tracks 7–8 were originally released on Peace on You (1974).
9. "Lover of the Bayou" – 3:22
  Track 9 was originally released on Roger McGuinn & Band (1975)
10. "Stone (The Lord Loves a Rolling Stone)" (Spooner Oldham, Dan Penn) – 3:03
  Track 10 was originally released on Roger McGuinn (1973).
11. "Lisa" (McGuinn) – 2:00
  Track 11 was originally released on Roger McGuinn & Band (1975)
12. "Take Me Away" – 3:01
13. "Jolly Roger" – 4:58
14. "Friend" (McGuinn) – 2:07
15. "Dreamland" (Joni Mitchell) – 5:20
  Tracks 12–15 were originally released on Cardiff Rose (1976).
16. "Dixie Highway" – 3:27
17. "American Girl" (Tom Petty) – 4:28
  Tracks 16–17 were originally released on Thunderbyrd (1977).
18. "Up to Me" (Bob Dylan) – 5:37
  Track 18 was originally released on Cardiff Rose (1976).
19. "Russian Hill" – 5:06
  Track 19 was originally released on Thunderbyrd (1977).
20. "Born to Rock and Roll" – 3:17
  Track 20 was originally released on Roger McGuinn & Band (1975)

== Personnel ==
- Vic Anesini – remastering
- Kristine Arnold – backing vocals
- Greg Attaway – drums
- Bruce Barlow – bass
- Hal Blaine – tambourine
- Richard Bowden – guitar
- John Boylan – producer
- Gene Clark – backing vocals
- Michael Clarke – drums
- David Crosby – backing vocals
- Donnie Dacus – rhythm guitar, backing vocals
- Don DeVito – producer
- Bob Dylan – harmonica
- Buddy Emmons – steel guitar
- Chris Ethridge – bass
- Dan Fogelberg – backing vocals
- Steve Forman – percussion
- Tim Geelan – remastering
- Marty Grebb – keyboards
- Paul Grupp – engineer
- John Guerin – drums
- Bill Halverson – producer
- Paul Harris – keyboards
- Charlie Harrison – bass, vocals
- Chris Hillman – backing Vocals
- Kim Hutchcroft – saxophone
- Bruce Johnston – backing vocals
- Jimmy Joyce – backing vocals
- Alex Kazanegras – engineer
- Russ Kunkel – percussion, drums
- Gary Ladinsky – engineer
- Charles Lloyd – saxophone
- Steve Love – bass
- David Lovelace – keyboards
- David Mansfield – organ, banjo, guitar, mandolin, percussion, violin, steel guitar
- Roger McGuinn – acoustic and electric guitar, arranger, vocals, producer
- Spooner Oldham – organ, piano
- Janis Oliver-Gill – backing vocals
- Kristine Oliver – backing vocals
- Jennifer O'Neill – backing vocals
- Mick Ronson – organ, guitar, percussion, piano, accordion, autoharp, recorder, vocals, producer
- Andrew Sandoval – liner notes
- Timothy B. Schmit – vocals
- Tom Scott – saxophone
- Leland Sklar – bass
- Rob Stoner – bass, percussion, vocals
- Greg Thomas – percussion, drums
- David Vaught – bass
- Rick Vito – Dobro, guitar, harmonica, vocals
- Mike Wooferd – keyboards
- Howie Wyeth – percussion, drums
- Risa Zaitschek – art direction
