= If I Needed Someone =

1965 song by the Beatles

- Cover of the Northern Songs sheet music

Song by the Beatles

from the album Rubber Soul
- Released: 3 December 1965
- Recorded: 16 and 18 October 1965
- Studio: EMI, London
- Genre: Folk rock, pop rock, power pop
- Length: 2:23
- Label: Parlophone
- Songwriter: George Harrison
- Producer: George Martin

"If I Needed Someone" is a song by the English rock band the Beatles, written by George Harrison, the group's lead guitarist. It was released in December 1965 on their album Rubber Soul, except in North America, where it appeared on the June 1966 release Yesterday and Today. The song reflects the reciprocal influences shared between the Beatles and the American band the Byrds. On release, it was widely considered to be Harrison's best song to date. A recording by the Hollies was issued in Britain on the same day as Rubber Soul and peaked at number 20 on the national singles chart.

Harrison wrote the song for Pattie Boyd, the English model whom he married in January 1966. The lyrics convey an ambivalent tone, however, and have invited interpretation as a message to a casual love interest. Harrison based the song's jangly guitar riff on one used by Roger McGuinn in the Byrds' adaptation of "The Bells of Rhymney". "If I Needed Someone" features prominent three-part harmony vocals and Rickenbacker twelve-string electric guitar – the instrument that the Byrds had adopted to replicate Harrison's sound in the 1964 film A Hard Day's Night. The song's use of drone and Mixolydian harmony also reflected Harrison's nascent interest in Indian classical music. Following its inclusion in the set list for the Beatles' 1965 UK tour, it became the only Harrison composition performed live by the group.

The Hollies' success with the song gave Harrison his first chart hit as a songwriter, although his criticism of their performance led to a tense exchange in the press between the two groups. Several other artists covered the track in the first year after its release, including the American bands Stained Glass and the Kingsmen. A live recording by Harrison, taken from his 1991 tour with Eric Clapton, appears on the album Live in Japan. Clapton also performed the song at the Concert for George tribute to Harrison in 2002, while McGuinn released a cover version on his 2004 album Limited Edition.

== Background and inspiration ==
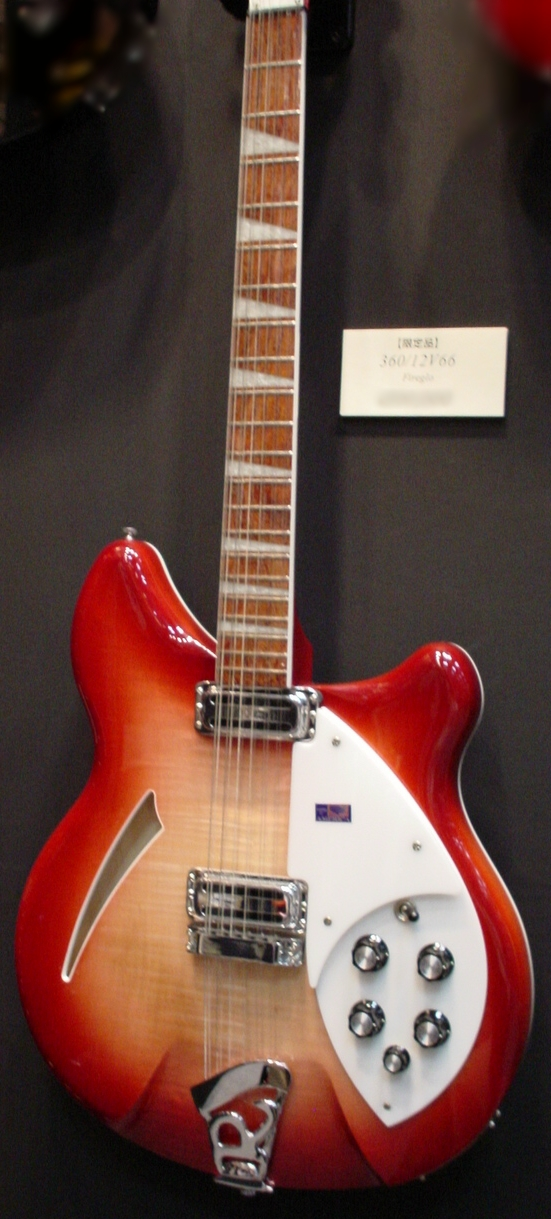
The Rickenbacker 360/12, a guitar popularised by the Beatles in 1964 and subsequently adopted by the Byrds

In addition to reflecting George Harrison's interest in Indian classical music, "If I Needed Someone" was inspired by the music of the Byrds, who in turn had based their sound and image on those of the Beatles after seeing the band's 1964 film A Hard Day's Night. According to music journalist David Fricke, the composition resulted from "a remarkable exchange of influences between the Beatles and one of their favorite new bands, the Byrds". The two groups formed a friendship in early August 1965, when the Byrds were enjoying international success with their debut single, a folk rock interpretation of Bob Dylan's "Mr. Tambourine Man", and Harrison and John Lennon attended their first shows in London. Although the concerts received unfavourable reviews in the British music press, Harrison lauded the band as "the American Beatles". (Note: In America, Newsweek magazine called the Byrds "the Dylanized Beatles" and the nation's answer to the British Invasion.) In late August, the Byrds' Jim (later Roger) McGuinn and David Crosby met up with the Beatles in Los Angeles, where they discussed with Lennon and Harrison the music of Indian sitarist Ravi Shankar and American Indo-jazz pioneer John Coltrane. The meeting led to Harrison introducing the sitar on Lennon's song "Norwegian Wood", and to Crosby and McGuinn incorporating Indian influences into the Byrds' "Why" and "Eight Miles High". (Note: In addition, on Crosby's recommendation, Harrison sought out recordings by Shankar, which soon produced a more overt Indian classical influence in much of the Beatles' work. Subsequently a student of the sitarist, Harrison came to symbolise what Shankar termed "the great sitar explosion" in Western pop and the counterculture's fascination with Indian spirituality.)

I'll tell you about that song. It was just purely based on the Rickenbacker 12-string sound. Just as the Byrds were influenced by the Beatles, we were influenced by the Byrds.

— George Harrison, 1987

Harrison likened "If I Needed Someone" to "a million other songs" that are based on a guitarist's finger movements around the D major chord. (Note: Harrison himself returned to this motif on D major in his 1969 composition "Here Comes the Sun".) The song is founded on a riff played on a Rickenbacker 360/12, which was the twelve-string electric guitar that McGuinn had adopted as the Byrds' signature instrument after seeing Harrison playing one in A Hard Day's Night. When McGuinn told him this in Los Angeles, Harrison was appreciative of the recognition, particularly as his contributions to the Beatles were often overshadowed by those of Lennon and Paul McCartney. In late 1965, Harrison acknowledged the Byrds' influence on "If I Needed Someone" when he sent a copy of the Beatles' new album, Rubber Soul, along with a message for McGuinn and Crosby, to Derek Taylor, the Byrds' publicist. In his note, Harrison said that the riff was based on the one McGuinn had played on the Byrds' adaptation of "The Bells of Rhymney", and that the rhythm was based on the drum part in "She Don't Care About Time". (Note: While in Los Angeles with the Byrds, Harrison and McCartney had attended the band's recording session for "The Times They Are A-Changin'", during which they heard the recently recorded "She Don't Care About Time".) McGuinn later recalled: "George was very open about it. He sent [the record] to us in advance and said, 'This is for Jim' – because of that lick [in 'The Bells of Rhymney']."

Writing in The Beatles Anthology, Harrison commented on the difficulties he faced as a nascent songwriter during the Rubber Soul period, relative to Lennon and McCartney, both of whom had been writing "since they were three years old". (Note: Before Rubber Soul, Harrison had contributed just three songs to the Beatles: "Don't Bother Me" on With the Beatles (1963), and "I Need You" and "You Like Me Too Much" on Help! (1965).) He said he wrote "If I Needed Someone" as a love song to Pattie Boyd, the English model whom he married soon after the song's release. The lyrics have nevertheless invited interpretation as being about a groupie or, in the words of music journalist Robert Fontenot, "some other attempt by the singer to juggle two affairs at once". Author Peter Doggett comments on Harrison's inspiration, in the context of the Beatlemania that continually encroached on the band's lifestyle: "'If I Needed Someone' may be the first pop song written from the jaded, though not quite exhausted viewpoint of a man who had women lined up outside his hotel door in every city of the world."

== Composition ==
=== Music ===
As recorded by the Beatles, "If I Needed Someone" is in the key of A major, over the verses, and B minor in the middle eights (or bridges). The time signature throughout is common time. After its introduction, the composition consists of two verses, a bridge, three verses (the second of which serves as an instrumental break), followed by a repeat of the bridge, a further verse, and an outro. The song is in the folk rock style, but incorporates aspects of Indian music through the suggestion of drone over the main musical phrase and its partly Mixolydian harmony. Harrison uses a capo on the guitar's seventh fret, thereby transposing the D major chord shape to sound as A major.

The Mixolydian melody in the verses comprises the notes A, G, B, C♯ and D, partly mirroring the riff, and is delivered in the same syncopated phrasing. On the fifth bar of each verse, a B melody-note sounds over a ♭VII triad – a chord that musicologist Dominic Pedler terms a G/A "slash" polychord, similar to that used at the start of "A Hard Day's Night". The implied drone, or pedal point, in A continues under this new chord, aided by the arpeggiated bass line remaining in A. The verses retain an ascendant melodic quality due to the syncopated delivery, the three-part harmonies in the vocal arrangement, and the constant bass figure.

Over the bridges, the new key is set fully in the minor mode, avoiding the Dorian inflections present in previous Harrison songs. These sections begin on an E minor chord, which, in Roman numeral analysis, represents a v minor in the tonic of A and an iv minor in the new key. At the end of each bridge, the return to the home key is effected via an E major chord, marking the only use of the expected G♯ note in the A major scale.

=== Lyrics ===
Author Jonathan Gould describes "If I Needed Someone" as "a rueful rain check of a love song" and "an exercise in hypothetical romance". He comments that the melody's phrasing on the off-beat and the "drastically arpeggiated" bass line mirror the lyrical theme of "right person at the wrong time". As with much of the Beatles' songwriting on Rubber Soul, the lyrics reflect Dylan's influence, in terms of tone and content. Further to the message of the song title, Harrison offers his love only if he should happen to need "someone", and on the condition that time allows for such a relationship; he conveys his feelings in matter-of-fact terms. In Fontenot's description, the lyrics "are representative of the change in the Beatles' outlook and also of its era: tender but ambivalent". Harrison invites the woman he addresses to "Carve your number on my wall", yet offers only the possibility that he will contact her in the future.

Over the two bridges, Harrison presents a more engaged perspective. He states that he's "too much in love", but had he and his lover met "some other day", the outcome might have been different. Fontenot cites these lyrics as the reason why some commentators attach an alternative meaning to the song, whereby the singer is already in a committed relationship and is addressing another woman, with the prospect of continuing a casual encounter. (Note: This interpretation is proffered by authors Ian Inglis, James Decker and Tim Riley. In his commentary on "If I Needed Someone", Richie Unterberger of AllMusic also adheres to the "other woman" scenario, with the proviso: "presumably; that isn't spelled out exactly".) In author Andrew Grant Jackson's reading, "[Harrison] was heading towards marriage with Pattie Boyd, so the lyrics address all the women of the world, saying that had he met them earlier, it might have worked out, but now he was too much in love (but give me your number just in case)." While considering that Harrison appears to be "playing his options, albeit gently", author John Kruth deems the line "Carve your number on my wall" to be "one of Rubber Soul's most enigmatic lyrics" and an evocation of the imagery in "Norwegian Wood". (Note: The title of "Norwegian Wood" referred to the cheap pine wall panelling then popular in London. Lennon said he wrote the song about an extramarital affair he was having at the time, but deliberately worded the narrative to hide the truth from his wife, Cynthia.)

== Recording ==
George Martin, the band's producer, described Rubber Soul as "the first album to present a new, growing Beatles to the world". Throughout the project, the Beatles increasingly experimented with sound textures. In the case of "If I Needed Someone", as with "Girl", a Lennon composition recorded at the end of the sessions, the use of a guitar capo midway along the instrument's neck introduced a brighter tone to the group's guitar sound. Their use of three-part harmonies on the song was also typical of the warmer, more mature sound they achieved on Rubber Soul.

The Beatles taped the rhythm track of "If I Needed Someone" at EMI Studios in London, in a single take, on 16 October 1965. The recording took place just before midnight at the end of a session dedicated to their next single, "Day Tripper". Harrison played his new, 1965 Rickenbacker 360/12 on the song. (Note: Harrison received this updated model of the 360/12 when the Beatles were in Bloomington, Minnesota during their August 1965 US tour.) According to musicologist Walter Everett, the sound of Harrison's chiming guitar, combined with that of Lennon's Fender Stratocaster rhythm part, produced "the Beatles' brightest guitar sound yet", and so served as "a fitting tribute to the Byrds". Using his new Rickenbacker 4001S bass, McCartney inaugurated an ostinato-heavy style that would feature prominently on the band's 1966 recordings, particularly the song "Rain".

The group carried out their vocal overdubs during the afternoon of 18 October. Over the instrumental break and the outro, the harmonies consist of McCartney singing a third above and Lennon a tenth below Harrison's double-tracked lead vocal. During the same session, Ringo Starr added a tambourine part. Although some Beatles authors credit Martin as having played harmonium, Fontenot says this contribution is inaudible on the completed track. Jackson writes that the sound on "If I Needed Someone" was "so transcendent", in its combination of elements from the two Byrds songs and the Beatles' "soaring harmonies" and treble-rich guitar parts, that Lennon chose to use it for his Rubber Soul track "Nowhere Man". (Note: Jackson adds that "the jangle pop style that the Beatles and the Byrds were developing together" became an "integral part" of Rubber Soul. Everett says that the Byrds' harmony singing was influenced by the Beatles, among other British acts, and that for the harmonies on "If I Needed Someone" and "Day Tripper", as on their 1966 album Revolver, the Beatles in turn adopted a "Byrds-like technique" in their use of "pantonal planing of three-part root-position triads".) A mono mix of the song was made on 25 October, and a stereo mix on 26 October – the day the Beatles collected their MBEs from Buckingham Palace.

== Release and reception ==
EMI's Parlophone label released Rubber Soul on 3 December 1965, with "If I Needed Someone" sequenced as the penultimate track. In the United States – where Capitol Records typically altered the content of the Beatles' albums, reducing the number of songs and using single A- and B-sides to create further album releases – the track instead appeared on the North American album Yesterday and Today in June 1966. The song was widely considered to be Harrison's best composition to date; according to music critic Richie Unterberger, "If I Needed Someone" and "Think for Yourself", which also appeared on the UK version of Rubber Soul, were the first Harrison-written songs "to really make people sit up and notice". In his review for the NME, Allen Evans described it as "a quick-tempo up-beater" and a "more-ish track". McCartney later said he considered "If I Needed Someone" to be the first of Harrison's "landmark" songs for the group.

Beginning with the band's UK tour in December 1965, "If I Needed Someone" replaced "Everybody's Trying to Be My Baby", written by Carl Perkins, as Harrison's lead vocal spot in the Beatles' live shows. "If I Needed Someone" thereby became the only Harrison composition that the Beatles played in concert during their touring years of 1963–66. (Note: During the band's pre-fame years in Hamburg, however, the Beatles included the Harrison–Lennon instrumental "Beatle Bop", later retitled as "Cry for a Shadow".) In addition, with the group finding it increasingly difficult to replicate their studio recordings in concert, it was one of only two Rubber Soul tracks that they performed live, the other being "Nowhere Man". In their 1966 concerts, McCartney introduced Indian-style melisma into his singing on "If I Needed Someone", similar to the vocal ornamentation he had used on the recording of Harrison's Revolver track "I Want to Tell You". In a segment subtitled "Beatlemania goes sour", the 1982 documentary The Compleat Beatles used a clip from the Beatles' ragged performance of the song, at the Budokan Hall in Tokyo, as an illustration of the growing division between the band as recording artists and live performers.

In November 1995, "If I Needed Someone" was issued as the B-side of "Norwegian Wood" on a jukebox single, pressed on green vinyl. The release was part of a series of Beatles jukebox singles issued by Capitol's CEMA Special Markets division. The song was also one of the Beatles tracks that Capitol included on the compilation album The Best of George Harrison, released in 1976 following the expiration of Harrison's contract with EMI.

== Hollies version ==
"If I Needed Someone"
- Dutch picture sleeve

Single by the Hollies
- B-side: "I've Got a Way of My Own"
- Released: 3 December 1965
- Recorded: 17 November 1965
- Studio: EMI, London
- Genre: Pop, folk rock
- Length: 2:19
- Label: Parlophone
- Songwriter: George Harrison
- Producer: Ron Richards

The Hollies singles chronology
"Look Through Any Window" (1965)	"If I Needed Someone" (1965)	"I Can't Let Go" (1966)

In late October 1965, the Hollies were brought a demo of "If I Needed Someone" by their producer, Ron Richards, who had received the demo from George Martin. (Note: Looking to achieve the financial rewards enjoyed by music producers in the United States, Richards and Martin were among the EMI staff who left the company to form Associated Independent Recording in August 1965.) At this stage of their career, most of the Hollies' singles were written by outside writers, yet the band were divided about whether to record a Beatles song, given the traditional rivalry between the two groups' hometowns, Liverpool and Manchester. With Graham Nash and Allan Clarke keen to record the song, the Hollies accepted it as the follow-up to their recent hit "Look Through Any Window". The group recorded their version in three takes on 17 November 1965, in the same studio as the Beatles. Backed by the Clarke–Hicks–Nash composition "I've Got a Way of My Own", the single was released by Parlophone on 3 December, the same day as Rubber Soul. (Note: In the United States, it was issued by Imperial Records in November 1967, after the Hollies had switched their US distribution to Epic Records.)

In those days, tweaking a Beatle was like blaspheming the pope ... Every English group owed them a huge debt, but I had no intention of kissing their asses ... Besides, last I looked, the Hollies were holding down places on the same top ten as the Beatles, so pardon me if you don't like our fucking record but keep it to yourself, if you please.

— Graham Nash, 2013

"If I Needed Someone" was the first Harrison composition to become a chart hit, as a result of the Hollies' cover. The song peaked at number 20 in Britain, but by the group's standards at the time, it was one of their least successful singles. It also charted in Sweden, peaking at number 14 on Tio i Topp.

Many listeners perceived the single as the Hollies attempting to align themselves with the Beatles. In one of his articles covering the Beatles' concurrent UK tour, Alan Smith of the NME quoted Harrison as saying that the Hollies' version was "rubbish" and that "the way they do their records, they sound like session men who've just got together in a studio without ever seeing each other before. Technically good, yes. But that's all." Lennon also criticised their treatment of the song, having long disliked the Hollies' sound. These comments incensed Nash, who responded by saying that he was tired of Lennon's continual insults and would "back any of us boys against the Beatles musically any time". In January 1966, at a press conference following his and Boyd's wedding, Harrison laughed off a reporter's question as to whether he had invited the Hollies to the ceremony, adding that the issue had "just got out of hand".

Although he and Harrison later became "great friends", Nash attributed the single's relatively low chart position to Harrison's derision of the group's performance. Author Ian Inglis writes that the formation of Crosby, Stills & Nash – comprising Crosby from the Byrds, Nash from the Hollies, and ex-Buffalo Springfield guitarist Stephen Stills – brought the connections behind "If I Needed Someone" "full circle". (Note: While living in London in late 1968, the newly formed Crosby, Stills & Nash auditioned for the Beatles' Apple record label. Harrison was keen to sign the group to the label, but the three members' existing contracts made this an impossibility.) Everett comments that the three-part parallel harmony singing, for which Crosby, Stills & Nash were "revered", suggests the influence of "If I Needed Someone".

== Retrospective assessment and legacy ==
Writing in Rolling Stone in January 2002, Greg Kot described "If I Needed Someone" as Harrison's "finest tune to date" by 1965. In the same publication, David Fricke included it in his list of the "25 Essential Harrison Performances". Fricke described the track as, variously, a "folk-rock diamond" and "the ultimate compliment" to the Byrds in its "striking blend of cool dismissal ... and crystalline riffing". Writing for Q magazine, John Harris recognised Rubber Soul as marking Harrison's "first decisive stride forward" as a songwriter, with "If I Needed Someone" suggesting for the first time that he could match the standard of Lennon and McCartney's work. Bruce Eder of AllMusic identifies the song as a "near-classic" written by Harrison during a period when his association with the Rickenbacker guitar had helped define the folk rock sound of groups such as the Byrds. In a 2002 review of Rubber Soul, for Mojo, Richard Williams admired the track as "a little gem, an early classic of power pop which lasts not a second too long".

Doug Collette of All About Jazz describes "If I Needed Someone" and "Think for Yourself" as "his most stylish tunes" and examples of Harrison's rise within the Beatles, although he highlights the guitarist's use of sitar on "Norwegian Wood" as a more creatively important contribution. In his article celebrating the 50th anniversary of Rubber Soul, Rob Sheffield identifies the album as the work on which the Beatles became true recording artists. He cites "If I Needed Someone" as one of the tracks that, in their focus on modern, independent-thinking women, presented "complex and baffling females, much like the ones the Beatles ended up with in real life".

Among Beatles biographers, Ian MacDonald recognises the song as having been influenced "far more" by Indian classical music than by the Byrds. While he views it as Harrison's "most successful song" up to 1965, MacDonald considers that the lack of contrast between the verses and the bridges renders the track "monotonous", revealing an "obstinate quality" that typifies much of Harrison's writing. Tim Riley disagrees, instead recognising that the bridge "sets things in motion" compared to the verse's "ebb and flow". In addition to admiring the group's performance, particularly the restraint Starr employs to resolve the tension created by the ♭VII chord change, Riley describes "If I Needed Someone" as "every guitarist's hook-bound fantasy". (Note: Similarly impressed, Ian Inglis writes: "Harrison's sparkling guitar and the song's gorgeous three-part harmonies support a bright, attractive melody, but there is a tough and unexpected cynicism in his lyrics ...") Writing in Barry Miles' book The Beatles Diary, Peter Doggett considers it to be Harrison's best song "by far" up to that point, and he describes the group's harmony singing as "stunning" and "the tightest they'd yet achieved on record". In 2011, Rolling Stone ranked "If I Needed Someone" at number 51 in its list of the "100 Greatest Beatles Songs".

== Other versions ==
Aside from the Hollies, several artists covered "If I Needed Someone" soon after the Beatles recorded it. Stained Glass released the song as their first single – a version that Billboard magazine described as an "impressive debut" and "an exciting off-beat ballad". Having struggled to maintain their relevance against British Invasion bands, the Kingsmen recorded the song with an arrangement that authors Stuart Shea and Robert Rodriguez recognise as "a prototypically American response to British folk". This version, which failed to chart in the US when issued as a single, later appeared on the group's 1966 album Up and Away. Other artists who recorded it in 1966 include the Cryan' Shames, for their debut album, Sugar and Spice, and Hugh Masekela, who released it on Hugh Masekela's Next Album and went on to collaborate with the Byrds on their January 1967 single "So You Want to Be a Rock 'n' Roll Star".

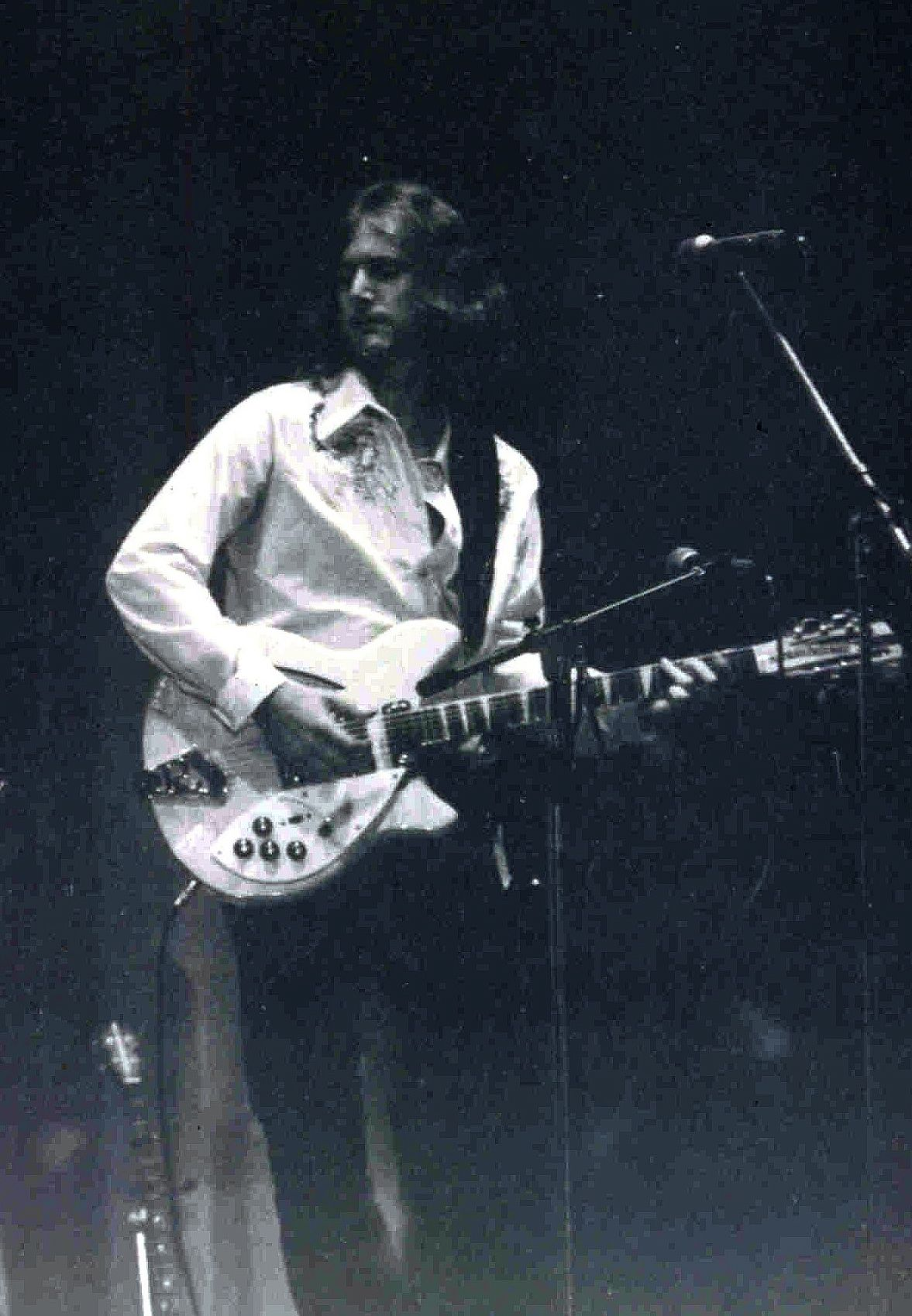
Roger McGuinn performing with the Byrds in 1972. McGuinn released a cover version of the song in 2004.

Harrison performed "If I Needed Someone" throughout his 1991 Japanese tour with Eric Clapton, a version from which appeared on the 1992 album Live in Japan. When discussing his choice of material for the tour, which was Harrison's first since his 1974 North American tour with Ravi Shankar, he told Billboard that the song was an obvious inclusion, given that the Beatles had played it during their only visit to Japan, in 1966. On this 1991 live version, in Inglis' description, Clapton's "looping guitar solos" complement Harrison's vocal, which is more prominent than on the Beatles' original and sung in the style of Dylan. In November 2002, a year after Harrison's death, Clapton performed the song at the Concert for George, held at London's Royal Albert Hall.

According to press announcements prior to the release in December 2002, Roger McGuinn recorded "If I Needed Someone" for inclusion on the multi-artist Harrison tribute album Songs from the Material World. The song did not appear on that release, but in 2004 McGuinn issued it as the opening track of his album Limited Edition. In his book on the making of Rubber Soul and its legacy, Kruth describes McGuinn's cover as "a supersonic reading" from the "master of the Rickenbacker twelve-string chime". In interviews to promote Limited Edition, McGuinn recalled Harrison's adaptation of the "Bells of Rhymney" riff as being "kind of a cool cross-pollination" and said that it was "a great honor to have in some small way influenced our heroes the Beatles".

Other artists who have covered "If I Needed Someone" include James Taylor and the doom metal band Type O Negative. The latter included it with "Day Tripper" and "I Want You (She's So Heavy)" as part of a Beatles medley on their 1999 album World Coming Down. In 2005, Nellie McKay recorded the song in the lounge jazz style for the multi-artist compilation This Bird Has Flown: A 40th Anniversary Tribute to the Beatles' Rubber Soul. The English folk duo Show of Hands have also covered the song, incorporating Eastern instruments such as the tabla. Their version appeared on the 2006 compilation Rubber Folk and on Harrison Covered, a Harrison tribute CD accompanying the November 2011 issue of Mojo.

== Personnel ==
According to Ian MacDonald, the line-up on the Beatles' recording was as follows:

The Beatles

- George Harrison – double-tracked lead vocal, lead guitar
- John Lennon – harmony vocal, rhythm guitar
- Paul McCartney – harmony vocal, bass guitar
- Ringo Starr – drums, tambourine

Additional musician

- George Martin – harmonium

== Sources ==
- Babiuk, Andy (2002). Beatles Gear. San Francisco, CA: Backbeat Books. ISBN 0-87930-731-5.
- Badman, Keith (2001). The Beatles Diary Volume 2: After the Break-Up 1970–2001. London: Omnibus Press. ISBN 978-0-7119-8307-6.
- The Beatles (2000). The Beatles Anthology. San Francisco, CA: Chronicle Books. ISBN 0-8118-2684-8.
- Castleman, Harry; Podrazik, Walter J. (1976). All Together Now: The First Complete Beatles Discography 1961–1975. New York, NY: Ballantine Books. ISBN 0-345-25680-8.
- Clayson, Alan (2003). George Harrison. London: Sanctuary. ISBN 1-86074-489-3.
- Decker, James M. (2009). "'Try Thinking More': Rubber Soul and the transformation of pop". In Womack, Kenneth (ed.). The Cambridge Companion to the Beatles. Cambridge, UK: Cambridge University Press. ISBN 978-0-521-68976-2.
- The Editors of Rolling Stone (2002). Harrison. New York, NY: Rolling Stone Press. ISBN 978-0-7432-3581-5.
- Everett, Walter (1999). The Beatles as Musicians: Revolver Through the Anthology. New York, NY: Oxford University Press. ISBN 0-19-512941-5.
- Everett, Walter (2001). The Beatles as Musicians: The Quarry Men through Rubber Soul. New York, NY: Oxford University Press. ISBN 0-19-514105-9.
- Everett, Walter (2006). "Painting Their Room in a Colorful Way". In Womack, Kenneth; Davis, Todd F. (eds.). Reading the Beatles: Cultural Studies, Literary Criticism, and the Fab Four. Albany, NY: State University of New York Press. ISBN 0-7914-6716-3.
- Gould, Jonathan (2007). Can't Buy Me Love: The Beatles, Britain and America. London: Piatkus. ISBN 978-0-7499-2988-6.
- Guesdon, Jean-Michel; Margotin, Philippe (2013). All the Songs: The Story Behind Every Beatles Release. New York, NY: Black Dog & Leventhal. ISBN 978-1-57912-952-1.
- Harrison, George (2002) [1980]. I, Me, Mine. San Francisco, CA: Chronicle Books. ISBN 978-0-8118-5900-4.
- Harry, Bill (2003). The George Harrison Encyclopedia. London: Virgin Books. ISBN 978-0-7535-0822-0.
- Hertsgaard, Mark (1996). A Day in the Life: The Music and Artistry of the Beatles. London: Pan Books. ISBN 0-330-33891-9.
- Hjort, Christopher (2008). So You Want to Be a Rock 'n' Roll Star: The Byrds Day-By-Day (1965–1973). London: Jawbone Press. ISBN 978-1-906002-15-2.
- Inglis, Ian (2010). The Words and Music of George Harrison. Santa Barbara, CA: Praeger. ISBN 978-0-313-37532-3.
- Jackson, Andrew Grant (2015). 1965: The Most Revolutionary Year in Music. New York, NY: Thomas Dunne Books. ISBN 978-1-250-05962-8.
- Kruth, John (2015). This Bird Has Flown: The Enduring Beauty of Rubber Soul, Fifty Years On. Milwaukee, WI: Backbeat Books. ISBN 978-1-61713-573-6.
- Lavezzoli, Peter (2006). The Dawn of Indian Music in the West. New York, NY: Continuum. ISBN 0-8264-2819-3.
- Leng, Simon (2006). While My Guitar Gently Weeps: The Music of George Harrison. Milwaukee, WI: Hal Leonard. ISBN 978-1-4234-0609-9.
- Lewisohn, Mark (1996). The Complete Beatles Chronicle. London: Bounty Books. ISBN 978-1-85152-975-9.
- Lewisohn, Mark (2005) [1988]. The Complete Beatles Recording Sessions: The Official Story of the Abbey Road Years 1962–1970. London: Bounty Books. ISBN 978-0-7537-2545-0.
- Lewisohn, Mark (2013). All These Years: Tune In. London: Little, Brown. ISBN 978-0-316-72960-4.
- MacDonald, Ian (2005). Revolution in the Head: The Beatles' Records and the Sixties (2nd rev. edn). Chicago, IL: Chicago Review Press. ISBN 978-1-55652-733-3.
- Miles, Barry (2001). The Beatles Diary Volume 1: The Beatles Years. London: Omnibus Press. ISBN 0-7119-8308-9.
- Mojo Special Limited Edition: 1000 Days That Shook the World (The Psychedelic Beatles – April 1, 1965 to December 26, 1967). London: Emap. 2002.
- Nash, Graham (2013). Wild Tales: A Rock & Roll Life. New York, NY: Crown Archetype. ISBN 978-0-385-34754-9.
- O'Grady, Terence J. (1983). The Beatles: A Musical Evolution. Twayne. ISBN 978-0-8057-9453-3.
- Pedler, Dominic (2003). The Songwriting Secrets of the Beatles. London: Omnibus Press. ISBN 978-0-7119-8167-6.
- Prendergast, Mark (2003). The Ambient Century: From Mahler to Moby – The Evolution of Sound in the Electronic Age. New York, NY: Bloomsbury. ISBN 1-58234-323-3.
- Riley, Tim (2002) [1988]. Tell Me Why – The Beatles: Album by Album, Song by Song, the Sixties and After. Cambridge, MA: Da Capo Press. ISBN 978-0-306-81120-3.
- Rodriguez, Robert (2012). Revolver: How the Beatles Reimagined Rock 'n' Roll. Milwaukee, WI: Backbeat Books. ISBN 978-1-61713-009-0.
- Rogan, Johnny (1998). The Byrds: Timeless Flight Revisited. Rogan House. ISBN 0-9529540-1-X.
- Schaffner, Nicholas (1978). The Beatles Forever. New York, NY: McGraw-Hill. ISBN 0-07-055087-5.
- Shea, Stuart; Rodriguez, Robert (2007). Fab Four FAQ: Everything Left to Know About the Beatles ... and More!. New York, NY: Hal Leonard. ISBN 978-1-4234-2138-2.
- Southall, Brian (2015). The Road Is Long: The Hollies Story. Kimbolton (Cambs.), UK: Red Planet. ISBN 978-1-905959-76-1.
- Winn, John C. (2008). Way Beyond Compare: The Beatles' Recorded Legacy, Volume One, 1962–1965. New York, NY: Three Rivers Press. ISBN 978-0-307-45239-9.
- Womack, Kenneth (2014). The Beatles Encyclopedia: Everything Fab Four. Santa Barbara, CA: ABC-CLIO. ISBN 978-0-313-39171-2.
