= Limited Edition (Roger McGuinn album) =

Studio album by Roger McGuinn
- Released: April 2004
- Studio: McGuinn's home studio, Orlando, FL; unnamed studio, Nashville, TN
- Genre: Folk rock
- Length: 44:39
- Label: April First Productions
- Producer: Roger McGuinn, Camilla McGuinn

Roger McGuinn chronology
Back from Rio (1991)	Limited Edition (2004)	CCD (2011)

Limited Edition is the seventh studio album by American rock musician Roger McGuinn. It was issued in April 2004 as an exclusive Internet release. The album marked McGuinn's return to his signature instrument, the Rickenbacker 12-string electric guitar, after several projects focusing on folk and other traditional musical styles. The opening song is a cover of the Beatles' 1965 track "If I Needed Someone", which McGuinn recorded as a tribute to George Harrison. The album's other tracks include seven songs written by McGuinn and his wife and longtime collaborator, Camilla McGuinn, and traditional songs arranged by the couple.

== Background and recording ==
McGuinn said he made Limited Edition in response to fans' requests for him to return to his Rickenbacker-based sound. The album took around eight months to record, with sessions held intermittently alongside his concert schedule. McGuinn recalled that, after recording "If I Needed Someone" in a professional studio in Nashville, and finding that the facility used computer software rather than traditional recording equipment, he decided to make the rest of the album at his home studio. He said he used the Adobe Audition program and that the album cost around $25,000 to make, relative to the $6000 spent at the Nashville studio on a single song.

Among the original compositions, "Parade of Lost Dreams" documents the cultural decline of Hollywood Boulevard as a statement on contemporary American society, while the verses of "Southbound 95" are taken from truck drivers' conversations heard on a CB radio. "Made in China" was inspired by Camilla McGuinn's concern that the U.S. media were underplaying the situation in China where, due to the country's one-child family planning policy, baby girls were being starved to death. In the line "Hey, now they can't bootleg my album there", the song also addresses China's refusal to recognize intellectual property rights.

McGuinn played his signature Rickenbacker 370/12 electric guitar on much of the album, which he said had a "Byrds feel" to it unlike his recent acoustic folk projects. He described Limited Edition as "an eclectic collection of traditional songs, electrified blues and songs written with my wife Camilla, rich in Rickenbacker 'jingle jangle.' The unifying factor is the Rickenbacker electric 12-string guitar sound." He also played banjo, and, on the blues-oriented tracks "Saint James Infirmary" and "James Alley Blues", an Epiphone Elitist "Byrdland" guitar. Another traditional song, "Shady Grove", combines folk and hip hop.

== Release and reception ==
Professional ratings
Review scores
Source	Rating
AllMusic	3/5 stars
Encyclopedia of Popular Music	3/5 stars
The Great Rock Discography	5/10

McGuinn released Limited Edition in April 2004 on his label April First Productions. The album was initially available only through his website, mcguinn.com, and the online retailer Amazon.com. He said that he titled the album Limited Edition "because it's limited as to where you can buy it." Coinciding with the release, McGuinn gave interviews to PopMatters, Christianity Today and epiphone.com. In an interview in November 2004, for The San Diego Union-Tribune, he commented that by doing away with a record company, he had made more money on Limited Edition than on any previous album during his career.

The album received a highly favourable review from Rolling Stone magazine. Ronnie Lankford of AllMusic criticised many of the musical arrangements, which included "the oddest take on 'Shady Grove' ever committed to CD", although he admired "Parade of Lost Dreams" as "an enticing folk-country-rock blend highlighted by the nifty guitar work". Lankford concluded: "Limited Edition will probably entertain hardcore McGuinn fans, but it doesn't qualify as a new chapter in his distinguished career." Rick Bell of The San Diego Union-Tribune described it as "a trip back to the days of '60s rock anthems 'Mr. Tambourine Man' and 'Turn, Turn, Turn'", adding that "many of the songs could have been blasting from an AM station through the tinny speakers of a '66 Thunderbird when McGuinn and an array of fellow Byrds first blended rock and folk …"

== Track listing ==
All tracks composed by Roger McGuinn and Camilla McGuinn; except where noted.

1. "If I Needed Someone" (George Harrison) – 3:16
2. "Paradise of Lost Dreams" – 3:09
3. "Shady Grove" (Traditional; arranged by Roger and Camilla McGuinn) – 2:40
4. "James Alley Blues" (Traditional; arranged by Roger and Camilla McGuinn) – 2:47
5. "On and On" – 2:35
6. "Southbound 95" – 3:52
7. "Castanet Dance" – 3:30
8. "Shenandoah" (Traditional; arranged by Roger and Camilla McGuinn) – 4:47
9. "When the Saints Go Marching In" (Traditional; arranged by Roger and Camilla McGuinn) – 3:57
10. "Saint James Infirmary" (Traditional; arranged by Roger and Camilla McGuinn) – 3:25
11. "May the Road Rise to Meet You (Back by Popular Request)" – 3:58
12. "Echoes" [live] (Roger McGuinn) – 3:45
13. "Made in China" – 2:56

== Personnel ==
- Roger McGuinn – vocals, 12-string electric and acoustic guitars, 6-string electric guitar, banjo
- John Jorgensen – bass guitar, 6-string guitar
- Pedro Araujo – keyboards
- Delyn Christian – harmonica, backing vocals
- Curt Keidser – drums
- Stan Lynch – drums
- Bill Lee – backing vocals
- Kammy Kolorado – backing vocals
