= Back from Rio =

Studio album by Roger McGuinn
- Released: January 8, 1991
- Recorded: Capitol (Hollywood)
- Genre: Rock
- Length: 41:44
- Label: Arista
- Producers: David Cole; Roger McGuinn

Roger McGuinn chronology
McGuinn – Hillman (1981)	Back from Rio (1991)	Born to Rock and Roll (1991)

Alternative cover
- Cover of European release

Singles from Back from Rio
- 1. "King of the Hill" Released: 1990; 2. "Someone to Love" Released: 1991

Professional ratings
Review scores
Source	Rating
AllMusic	4.5/5 stars
Entertainment Weekly	B
The Great Rock Discography	6/10
MusicHound	2/5
Orlando Sentinel	4/4 stars
Rolling Stone	4/5 stars

Back from Rio is the sixth studio album by American singer-songwriter, guitarist and co-founder of the Byrds Roger McGuinn. It was released on January 8, 1991 more than a decade after McGuinn's previous solo record, Thunderbyrd. The album was issued following the release of the Byrds box set and musically it leans on the sound of the Byrds thanks to McGuinn's ringing 12-string electric guitar and vocal contributions from ex-Byrds members David Crosby and Chris Hillman. Also prominent on the album are Tom Petty and the Heartbreakers with Petty co-authoring and duetting with McGuinn on the album's lead single "King of the Hill". In addition, several members of the Heartbreakers provide musical backing on a number of the album's tracks. Other prominent songwriters on the album—besides McGuinn and his wife Camilla—are Elvis Costello, Jules Shear and Dave Stewart of the Eurythmics.

The album was generally well received by music critics and it peaked at No. 44 on the Billboard 200 album chart. Two singles were drawn from the album: "King of the Hill" and "Someone to Love", which peaked at No. 2 and No. 12 on the Billboard Hot Mainstream Rock Tracks chart.

In Europe, Back from Rio was released in February 1991 and featured different cover artwork.

== Track listing ==
=== Side one ===
1. "Someone to Love" (Roger McGuinn, Camilla McGuinn) – 3:32
2. "Car Phone" (feat. Stan Ridgway) (Mike Campbell, R. McGuinn) – 4:33
3. "You Bowed Down" (Elvis Costello) – 3:52
4. "Suddenly Blue" (Scott Cutler, R. McGuinn, Dennis Morgan) – 3:49
5. "The Trees Are All Gone" (R. McGuinn, C. McGuinn) – 3:51

=== Side two ===
1. "King of the Hill" (duet with Tom Petty) (R. McGuinn, Tom Petty) – 5:27
2. "Without Your Love" (R. McGuinn, C. McGuinn) – 3:59
3. "The Time Has Come" (Scott Cutler, R. McGuinn) – 3:45
4. "Your Love Is a Gold Mine" (R. McGuinn, Dave Stewart) – 4:06
  - Includes "Back from Rio Interlude" (R. McGuinn, Petty, Jeff Lynne)
5. "If We Never Meet Again" (Jules Shear) – 4:28

== Personnel ==
- Mike Campbell – electric guitar, slide guitar, baritone guitar
- David Cole – percussion, piano, acoustic guitar, MPC-60
- Elvis Costello – backing vocals
- David Crosby – vocals, backing vocals
- George Hawkins – bass guitar
- Dan Higgins – saxophone
- Chris Hillman – vocals, background vocals
- John Jorgenson – acoustic guitar, electric guitar, baritone guitar, saxophone, bass guitar, mandolin
- Stan Lynch – drums, percussion
- Roger McGuinn – lead vocals, backing vocals, 12-string electric guitar, 12-string acoustic guitar
- Michael Penn – backing vocals, 12-string acoustic guitar
- Tom Petty – co-lead vocals ("King of the Hill"), backing vocals
- Stan Ridgway – telephone voice
- Kimmy Robertson – telephone voice
- Timothy B. Schmit – backing vocals
- J. Steven Soles – backing vocals
- Benmont Tench – organ, keyboards, Hammond B-3
- Michael Thompson – electric guitar, acoustic guitar

=== Production ===
- David Cole – producer, engineer, mixing
- Peter Doell – engineer
- John Hall – demo engineer, mixing at Firetail-on-the-Hill Studios
- Jesse Kanner – mixing
- Roger McGuinn – producer, mixing
- Wally Traugott – mastering

== Charts ==
=== Weekly charts ===
Weekly chart performance for Back from Rio
Chart (1991)	Peak
Canada Top Albums/CDs (RPM)	22
Dutch Albums (Album Top 100)	49
German Albums (Offizielle Top 100)	70
Norwegian Albums (VG-lista)	6
US Billboard 200	44

=== Year-end charts ===
1991 year-end chart performance for Back from Rio
Chart (1991)	Rank
Canada Top Albums/CDs (RPM)	99
