= Roger McGuinn (album) =

Studio album by Roger McGuinn
- Released: June 1973
- Studio: Wally Heider Studios, Los Angeles
- Genre: Rock; folk rock
- Label: Columbia
- Producer: Roger McGuinn

Roger McGuinn chronology
Roger McGuinn (1973)	Peace on You (1974)

Professional ratings
Review scores
Source	Rating
AllMusic	4/5 stars
Christgau's Record Guide	B

Roger McGuinn is the first full-length solo album by Roger McGuinn, released in 1973.

== History ==
This album was released after The Byrds' 1973 reunion album, on which all five founding members of the group participated in the sessions. McGuinn himself has stated that any outtakes left over from those sessions appeared here, but this was later proven to be false with the discovery of several alternate takes and at least one outtake in late 2009. The majority of the songs on the album were co-written with Jacques Levy, who collaborated with McGuinn on the abandoned country-rock musical Gene Tryp in 1968-1969 (most of the resulting songs appeared on The Byrds' (Untitled) and Byrdmaniax albums) and remained his principal lyricist until 1977.

Two songs (David Wiffen's "Lost My Drivin' Wheel" and "Bag Full of Money") were originally recorded by the Clarence White-era Byrds in 1972 but remained unreleased until re-release of Farther Along on CD in 2000. Additionally, three other songs ("I'm So Restless", "Hanoi Hannah" and "The Water Is Wide") were performed by The Byrds at least once; the former two were premiered at a concert in Brookville, New York in early 1971, while the latter was played at a later date in August 1972. An outtake from this album, Jackson Browne's "Jamaica, Say You Will", had also been performed by The Byrds throughout 1971, though Clarence White handled the lead vocal and McGuinn sang the high harmony. McGuinn sings lead on this iteration, which was left off the original album before being released as a bonus track on the 2004 reissue.

== Track listing ==
All tracks composed by Roger McGuinn and Jacques Levy, except where noted.

=== Side one ===
1. "I'm So Restless" – 3:05
2. "My New Woman" – 3:10
3. "Lost My Drivin' Wheel" (David Wiffen) – 3:27
4. "Draggin'" – 3:36
5. "Time Cube" (McGuinn, R. J. Hippard) – 3:15

=== Side two ===
1. "Bag Full Of Money" – 3:19
2. "Hanoi Hannah" – 2:50
3. "Stone" (Spooner Oldham, Dan Penn) – 2:59
4. "Heave Away" (Traditional; Arr. by McGuinn) – 3:03
5. "M' Linda" – 2:42
6. "The Water Is Wide" (Traditional; Arr. by McGuinn) – 3:05

=== 2004 CD reissue bonus tracks ===
1. "John, John" (Traditional; Arr. by McGuinn) – 2:43
2. "Jamaica, Say You Will" (Jackson Browne) – 3:10

== Personnel ==
- Roger McGuinn – vocals, guitars, banjo, Moog synthesizer, harmonica
- Gene Clark, Spanky McFarlane – vocals
- David Crosby, – guitars, vocals
- Jerry Cole – guitar
- Buddy Emmons – pedal steel guitar
- Bruce Johnston – piano, vocals
- Spooner Oldham – organ, piano
- David Vaught, Chris Ethridge, Chris Hillman, Leland Sklar – bass
- John Guerin, Michael Clarke, Jim Gordon – drums
- Charles Lloyd - saxophone
- Hal Blaine – tambourine, percussion
- Bob Dylan – harmonica
- Jimmy Joyce Children's Chorus—vocals on intro to "Stone"
