= Roger McGuinn & Band =

Studio album by Roger McGuinn
- Released: June 1975
- Genre: Rock
- Length: 29:25
- Label: Columbia
- Producer: John Boylan

Roger McGuinn chronology
Peace on You (1974)	Roger McGuinn & Band (1975)	Cardiff Rose (1976)

Professional ratings
Review scores
Source	Rating
Allmusic	link
Christgau's Record Guide	C

Roger McGuinn & Band was Roger McGuinn's third full-length solo album and was released in 1975. Recorded in Los Angeles, the album was McGuinn's third attempt to re-establish himself as a significant musical force without The Byrds. The titular band included Stephen A. Love (electric bass), Richard Bowden (second guitar), David Lovelace (keyboards) and Greg Attaway (drums). The album peaked at number 162 in the US.

Produced by John Boylan, Roger McGuinn & Band was different from McGuinn's previous solo albums in that he allowed the musicians he had assembled to contribute to the songwriting of the album in the name of esprit de corps. Additionally, whereas McGuinn's previous albums showcased his ongoing songwriting partnership with lyricist Jacques Levy, two of his four contributions ("Lover of the Bayou" and "Born to Rock and Roll") were re-recordings of previously released Byrds songs. Unfortunately, while the band brought a tight, energetic groove to the music on the album, their songwriting contributions were disparaged by the contemporary press. Referring to the album many years later, McGuinn himself admitted that "A band should be a benevolent dictatorship. Democracy is a great form of government, but it doesn't work in rock & roll."

After the release of the album, McGuinn and the band spent a year touring to promote the record as an opening act for such bands as The Eagles and The Doobie Brothers (including performances at Madison Square Garden and Carnegie Hall) before McGuinn finally dissolved the group.

Roger McGuinn & Band has been reissued on CD a number of times; first by Columbia Records in the early 1990s, with bonus tracks in 2004 by Sundazed Music and coupled with McGuinn's fourth album, Cardiff Rose, by BGO Records in 2007.

== Track listing ==
1. "Somebody Loves You" (Stephen A. Love, Allen Kemp) – 3:17
2. "Knockin' on Heaven's Door" (Bob Dylan) – 3:19
3. "Bull Dog" (Richard Bowden) – 1:59
4. "Painted Lady" (Greg Attaway, David Lovelace) – 3:08
5. "Lover of the Bayou" (Jacques Levy, McGuinn) – 3:25
6. "Lisa" (McGuinn) – 1:58
7. "Circle Song" (David Lovelace) – 3:04
8. "So Long" (Richard Bowden) – 3:13
9. "Easy Does It" (McGuinn) – 2:41
10. "Born to Rock and Roll" (McGuinn) – 3:20

=== 2004 CD reissue bonus tracks ===
1. "Wasn’t Born To Follow" (Live) (Carole King, Gerry Goffin)
2. "Chestnut Mare" (Live) (Levy, McGuinn)

== Personnel ==
- Roger McGuinn – vocals, guitars
- Stephen A. Love - bass
- Richard Bowden - guitar
- Greg Attaway - drums
- David Lovelace - keyboards
