= Peace on You =

Studio album by Roger McGuinn
- Released: September 1974
- Recorded: The Record Plant, Wally Heider's, Los Angeles
- Genre: Rock
- Label: Columbia
- Producer: Bill Halverson

Roger McGuinn chronology
| Roger McGuinn (1973) | Peace on You (1974) | Roger McGuinn & Band (1975) |

Professional ratings
Review scores
| Source | Rating |
|---|---|
| AllMusic | 2/5 stars |
| Christgau's Record Guide | C+ |
| Entertainment Weekly | (C) |

Peace on You is Roger McGuinn's second full-length solo album, released in 1974. The album peaked at number 92 in the US in October 1974.

== Track listing ==
All tracks composed by Roger McGuinn and Jacques Levy except where otherwise noted.

=== Side one ===
1. "Peace on You" (Charlie Rich) – 4:01
2. "Without You" – 4:07
3. "Going to the Country" (Donnie Dacus) – 3:17
4. "(Please Not) One More Time" (Al Kooper) – 3:23
5. "Same Old Sound" (McGuinn) – 3:30

=== Side two ===
1. "Do What You Want to Do" (Dacus) – 3:00
2. "Together" – 3:45
3. "Better Change" (Dan Fogelberg) – 3:00
4. "Gate of Horn" – 2:45
5. "The Lady" – 4:16

=== 2004 CD reissue bonus tracks ===
1. "Rock & Roll Time" (Kris Kristofferson, McGuinn, Bobby Neuwirth) - 3:18

== Personnel ==
- Roger McGuinn - vocals, guitar, bass
- Dan Fogelberg - guitar, vocals
- Al Kooper - guitar, piano, clavinet, arrangements, conductor
- Jorge Calderón - vocals
- Brian Russell - vocals
- Tim Coulter - vocals
- Donnie Dacus - guitar, vocals
- Brenda Gordon - vocals
- Paul "Harry" Harris - keyboards
- Brooks Hunnicutt - vocals
- Howard Kaylan - vocals
- Russ Kunkel - drums, percussion
- Al Perkins - steel guitar
- Leland Sklar - bass
- Paul Stallworth - vocals
- Tommy Tedesco - flamenco guitar
- Mark Volman - vocals
- William McLeish Smith - vocals
- Gwendolyn Edwards - vocals
- Lee Kiefer - arranger and conductor
