= Thunderbyrd =

Album by Roger McGuinn

Studio album by Roger McGuinn
- Released: March 1977
- Recorded: 1976
- Studio: Wally Heider Studios, Haji Sound
- Genre: Rock
- Length: 37:34
- Label: Columbia
- Producer: Don DeVito

Roger McGuinn chronology
Cardiff Rose (1976)	Thunderbyrd (1977)	McGuinn, Clark & Hillman (1978)

Professional ratings
Review scores
Source	Rating
AllMusic	3/5 stars
Christgau's Record Guide	B
The Rolling Stone Album Guide	3/5 stars

Thunderbyrd is an album by the American musician Roger McGuinn, released in 1977 on the Columbia Records label. Following the success of his 1976 album Cardiff Rose, McGuinn intended to make another album in collaboration with its producer Mick Ronson. This project however never materialized. Instead he put together a new band, Thunderbyrd, and recorded this album with them.

The album contains four original compositions by McGuinn and his old songwriting collaborator Jacques Levy. It also includes a version of Tom Petty's "American Girl", originally a hit the year before from Tom Petty and the Heartbreakers's eponymous debut album.

Thunderbyrd was not well received by critics or record buyers and was to be McGuinn's last solo album until 1991's Back from Rio.

== Track listing ==
All tracks written by Jacques Levy and Roger McGuinn except where noted.

1. "All Night Long" (Peter Frampton, Mick Gallagher) – 4:19
2. "It's Gone" – 3:57
3. "Dixie Highway" – 3:29
4. "American Girl" (Tom Petty) – 4:30
5. "We Can Do It All Over Again" (Barry Goldberg, Mentor Williams) – 4:44
6. "Why Baby Why" (Darrell Edwards, George Jones) – 3:48
7. "I'm Not Lonely Anymore" – 3:07
8. "Golden Loom" (Bob Dylan) – 4:07
9. "Russian Hill" – 5:03

== Personnel ==
- Roger McGuinn – vocals, guitar
- Rick Vito – guitars, vocals, dobro, harmonica
- Charlie Harrison – bass, vocals
- Greg Thomas – drums, percussion

with:

- Marty Grebb – keyboards
- Tom Scott – saxophone solo on "American Girl"
- Janis Oliver-Gill, Kristine Oliver-Arnold, Jennifer O'Neill – backing vocals on "We Can Do It All Over Again"
- Bruce Barlow – bass on "It's Gone" and "Russian Hill"
- Steve Forman – percussion on "Russian Hill"
