= Roger McGuinn =

American musician (born 1942)

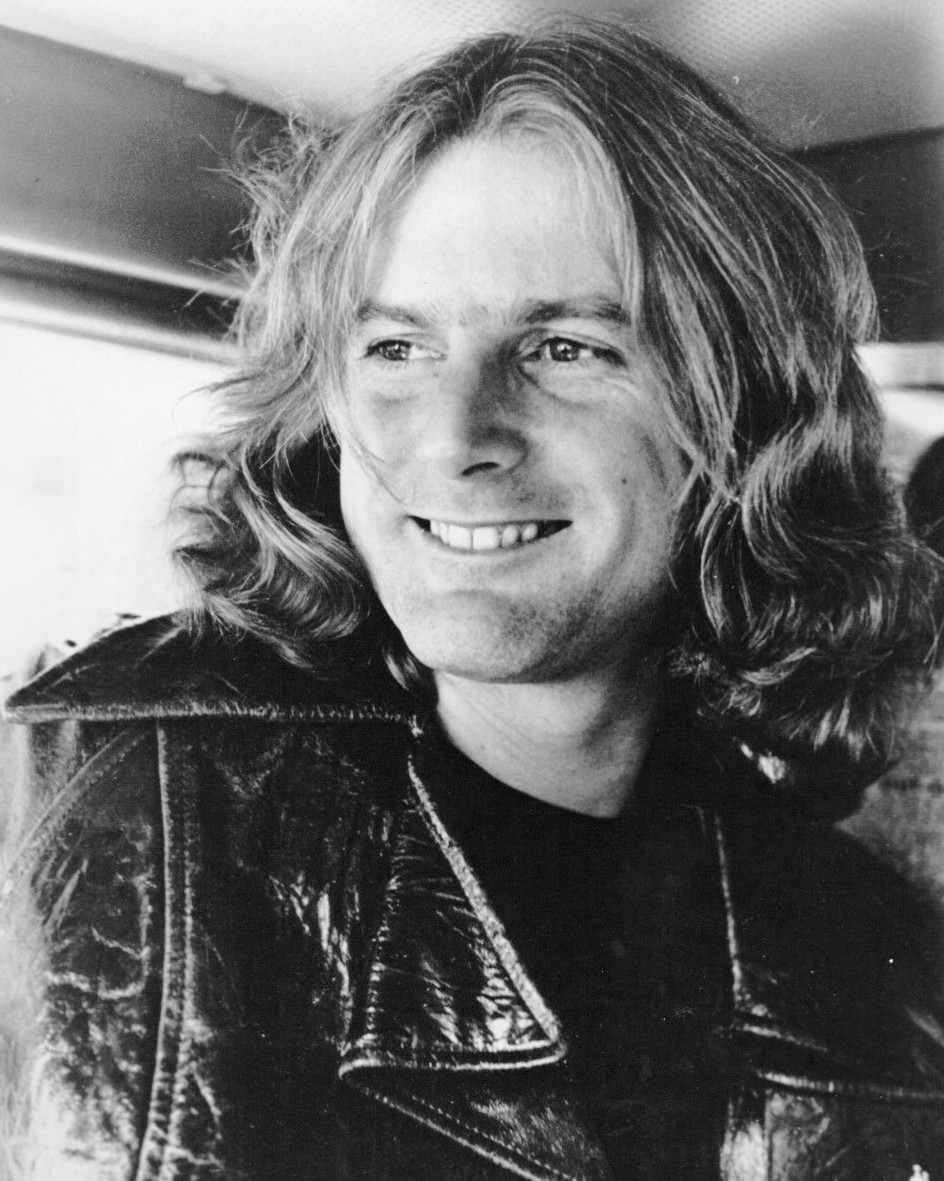
- McGuinn in 1976

Background information
- Also known as: Roger McGuin; James Roger McGuinn; Jim McGuinn
- Born: James Joseph McGuinn III; July 13, 1942 (age 84); Chicago, Illinois, U.S.
- Genres: Rock; folk; country; psychedelia
- Occupations: Musician; singer; songwriter; record producer
- Instruments: Guitar; vocals
- Years active: 1960–present
- Label: Columbia
- Formerly of: The Byrds
- Website: ibiblio.org/jimmy/mcguinn/index.html

James Roger McGuinn (/məˈɡwɪn/; born James Joseph McGuinn III; July 13, 1942) is an American musician, best known for being the leader of the Byrds. He has released ten albums and collaborated with many other performers, among them Bob Dylan, Tom Petty, and Chris Hillman. The Rickenbacker 12-string guitar is his signature instrument. He was inducted into the Rock and Roll Hall of Fame in 1991 along with The Byrds.

== Early life ==
McGuinn was born and raised in Chicago, Illinois, son of James Joseph McGuinn Jr (b. 1909) and Dorothy Irene (b. 1911), daughter of engineer Louis Heyn. His parents worked in journalism and public relations, and during his childhood, they wrote a bestseller titled Parents Can't Win. He attended the Latin School of Chicago. He became interested in music after hearing Elvis Presley's "Heartbreak Hotel" (a song that he frequently performs as a part of his autobiographical live shows), and asked his parents to buy a guitar for him. Around the same time, he was also influenced by individual performers and groups such as Johnny Cash, Carl Perkins, Gene Vincent and the Everly Brothers.

In 1957, he enrolled as a student at Chicago's Old Town School of Folk Music, where he learned the five-string banjo and 12-string guitar. After graduation, McGuinn performed solo at various coffeehouses on the folk music circuit where he was hired as a sideman by the Limeliters, the Chad Mitchell Trio, and Judy Collins and other folk music artists in the same vein. In 1962, after he ended his association with the Chad Mitchell Trio, McGuinn was hired by Bobby Darin as a backup guitarist and harmony singer. Darin wanted to add a folk roots element to his repertoire because it was a burgeoning musical field. Darin opened T.M. Music in New York City's Brill Building, hiring McGuinn as a songwriter for $35 a week. About a year and a half later, Darin became ill and retired from singing.

During 1963, just one year before he co-founded the Byrds in Los Angeles, McGuinn was working as a studio musician in New York, recording with Judy Collins and Simon & Garfunkel. At the same time, he was hearing about the Beatles (whose first American appearances would come in February 1964) and wondering how Beatlemania might affect folk music. When McGuinn saw George Harrison play a 12-string Rickenbacker in the film A Hard Day's Night, it inspired him to buy the same instrument.

By the time Doug Weston gave him a job at The Troubadour nightclub in Los Angeles, McGuinn had begun to include Beatles songs in his act. He gave rock style treatments to traditional folk tunes and thereby caught the attention of another folkie Beatles fan, Gene Clark, who joined forces with McGuinn in July 1964. Together they formed the beginning of what was to become the Byrds.

== The Byrds ==
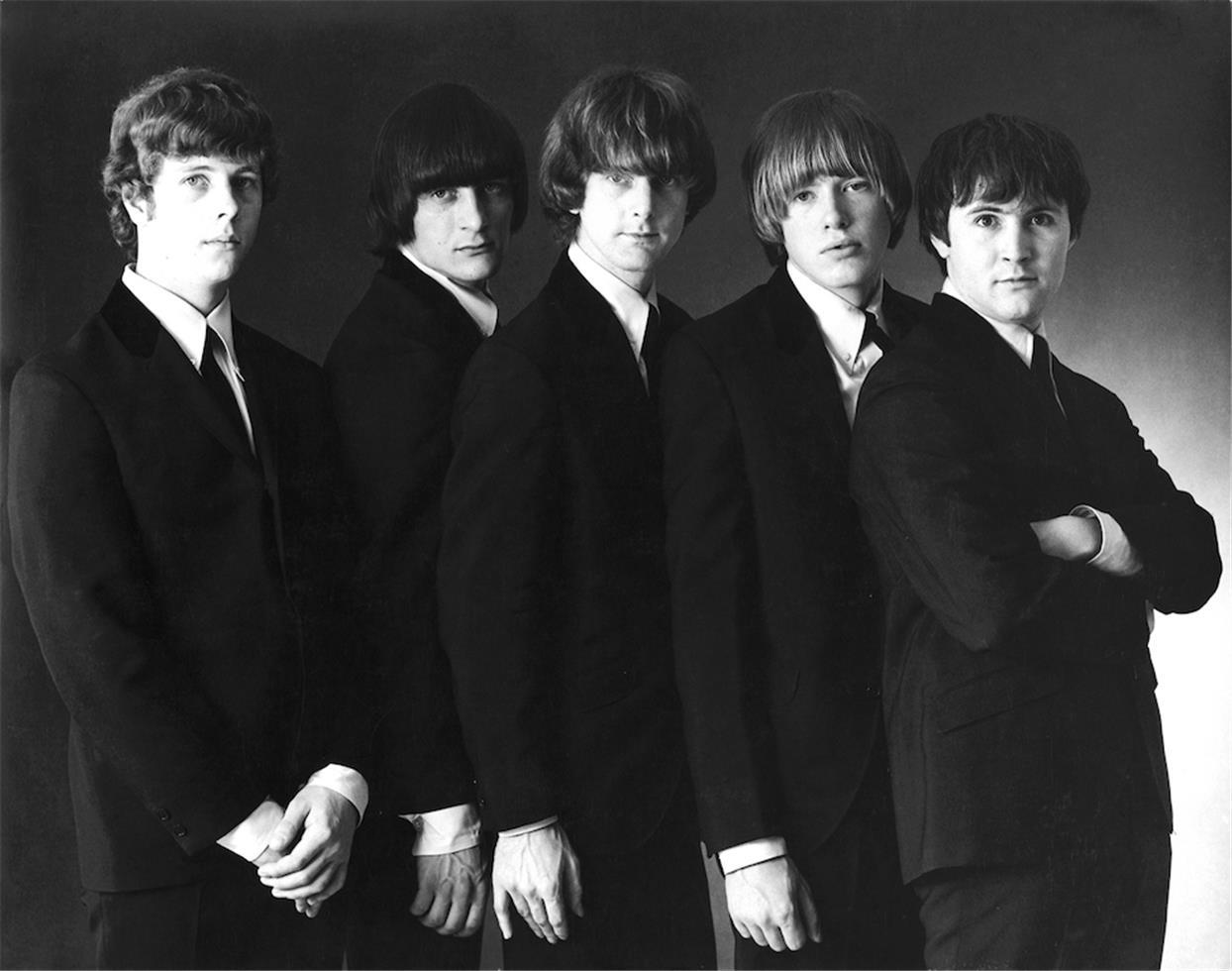
McGuinn (center) as a member of the Byrds in 1965

During his time with the Byrds, McGuinn developed two innovative and very influential styles of electric guitar playing. The first was "jingle-jangle", ringing arpeggios based on banjo finger picking styles he learned while at the Old Town School of Folk Music, which was influential in the folk rock genre. The second style was a merging of saxophonist John Coltrane's free-jazz atonalities, which hinted at the droning of the sitar, a style of playing first heard on the Byrds' 1966 single "Eight Miles High" and influential in psychedelic rock.

While "tracking" the Byrds' first single, "Mr. Tambourine Man" at Columbia studios, McGuinn discovered an important component of his style. "The 'Ric' 12-string Rickenbacker guitar by itself is kind of thuddy," he noted. "It doesn't ring. But if you add a compressor, you get that long sustain. To be honest, I found this by accident. The engineer, Ray Gerhardt, would run compressors on everything to protect his precious equipment from loud rock and roll. He compressed the heck out of my 12-string and it sounded so great we decided to use two tube compressors (likely Teletronix LA-2As) in series and then go directly into the board. That's how I got my 'jingle-jangle' tone. It's really squashed down but it jumps out from the radio. With compression, I found I could hold a note for three or four seconds, and sound more like a wind instrument. Later, this led me to emulate John Coltrane's saxophone on "Eight Miles High". Without compression, I couldn't have sustained the riff's first note."

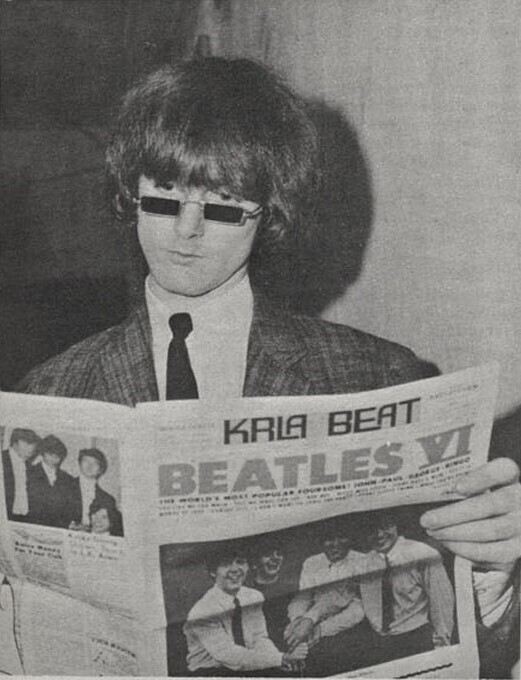
McGuinn reading KRLA Beat in mid-1965 while wearing his distinctive glasses

"I practiced eight hours a day on that 'Ric,'" he continues, "I really worked it. In those days, acoustic 12s had wide necks and thick strings that were spaced pretty far apart, so they were hard to play. But the Rick's slim neck and low action let me explore jazz and blues scales up and down the fretboard, and incorporate more hammer-ons and pull-offs into my solos. I also translated some of my banjo picking techniques to the 12-string. By combining a flat pick with metal finger picks on my middle and ring fingers, I discovered I could instantly switch from fast single-note runs to banjo rolls and get the best of both worlds."

Another sound that McGuinn developed is made by playing a seven string guitar, featuring a doubled G-string (with the second string tuned an octave higher). The C. F. Martin guitar company released a guitar called the HD7 Roger McGuinn Signature Edition that claims to capture McGuinn's "jingle-jangle" tone, which he created with 12-string guitars, while maintaining the ease of playing a 6-string guitar.

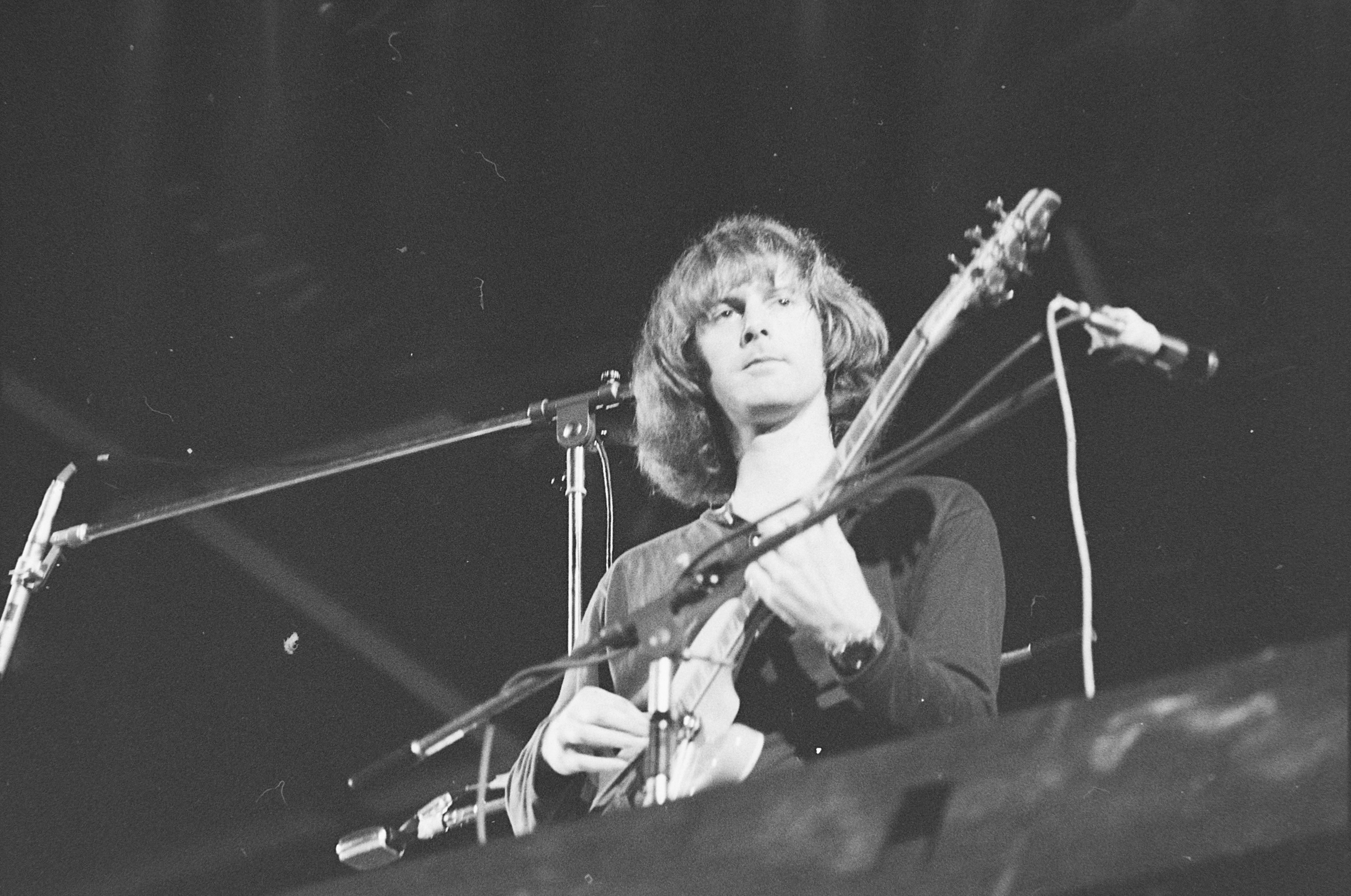
Roger McGuinn at Kralingen (1970)

After Mr. Tambourine Man in 1965, "Turn! Turn! Turn!", written by Pete Seeger with the lyrics drawn from Ecclesiastes in the Old Testament, was the Byrds' second Number One success in late 1965. In 1966, "Eight Miles High" peaked at no. 14 on the U.S. charts, achieving enduring classic status, even though the song was subject to a U.S. radio ban due to its alleged reference to recreational drug use. 1967 found the Byrds sliding still further in the charts, with "So You Want to Be a Rock 'n' Roll Star" which peaked at no. 29. "My Back Pages", another Bob Dylan song, was released later the same year and was to be their last top 40 hit. In 1969, McGuinn's solo version of the "Ballad of Easy Rider" appeared in the film Easy Rider, while a full-band version was the title track for the album released later that year. McGuinn also performed Dylan's "It's Alright, Ma (I'm Only Bleeding)" for the Easy Rider soundtrack. 1970's Untitled album featured a 16-minute version of the Byrds' 1966 hit "Eight Miles High", with all four members taking extended solos representative of the "jam-band" style of playing popular during that period.

In 1968, McGuinn helped create the groundbreaking album Sweetheart of the Rodeo, to which many attribute the rise in popularity of country rock. McGuinn originally conceived the album as a blend of rock, jazz, folk and other styles, but Gram Parsons and Chris Hillman's bluegrass-western-country influences came to the forefront.

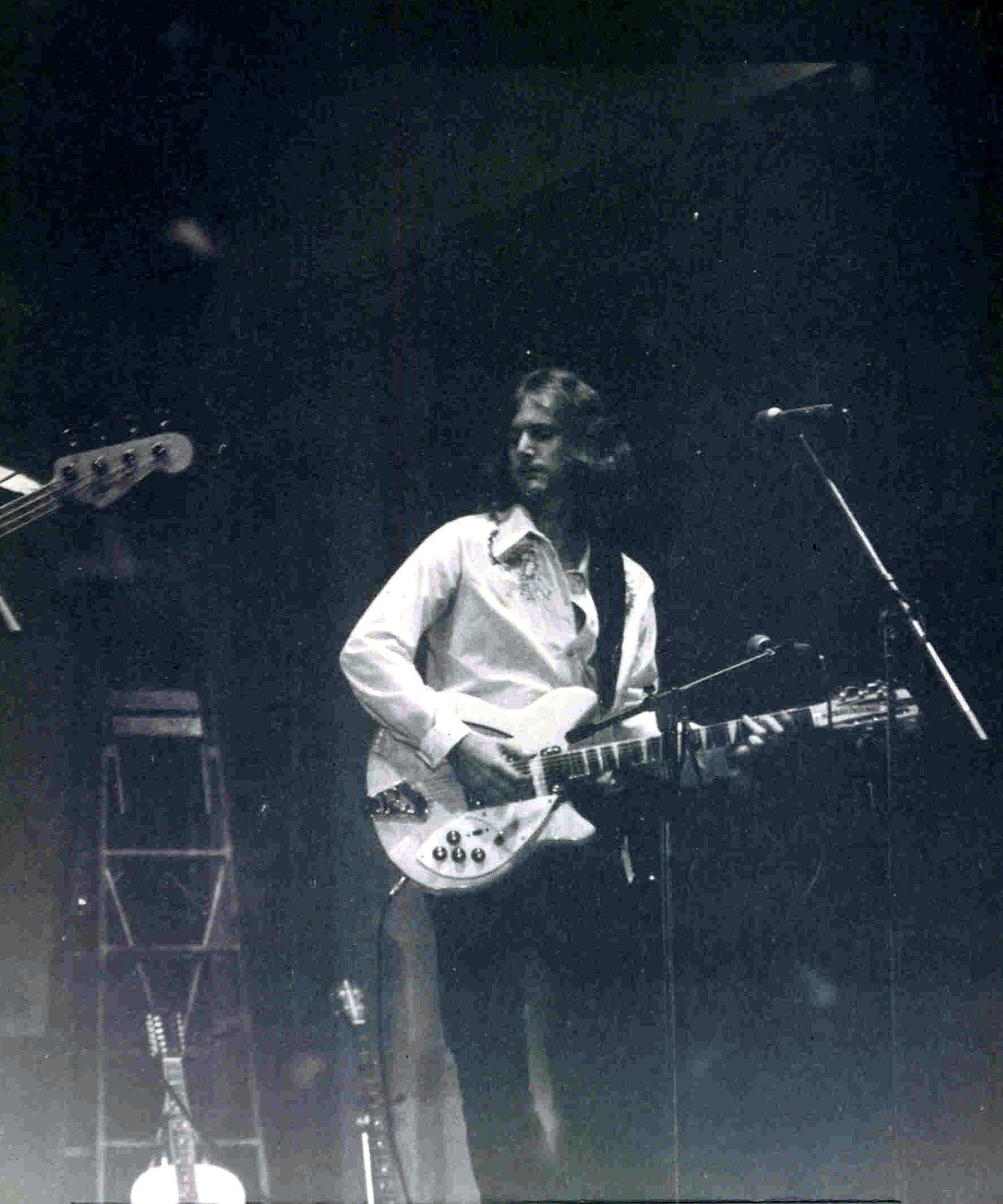
McGuinn with the Byrds at a concert held at Washington University in St. Louis (September 1972)

== Post-Byrds ==
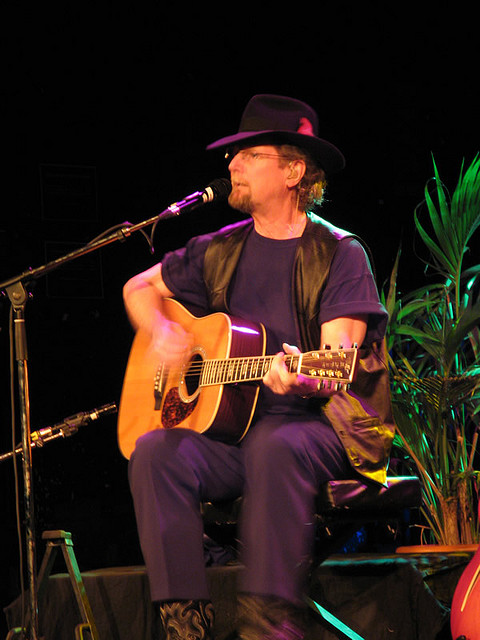
McGuinn performing in 2009

After the break-up of The Byrds, McGuinn released several solo albums throughout the 1970s. In 1973 he collaborated with Bob Dylan on songs for the soundtrack of the Sam Peckinpah movie Pat Garrett and Billy the Kid including "Knockin' on Heaven's Door". He toured with Dylan in 1975 and 1976 as part of Dylan's Rolling Thunder Revue, cancelling a planned tour of his own in order to participate. In late 1975, he played guitar on the track titled "Ride the Water" on Bo Diddley's The 20th Anniversary of Rock 'n' Roll all-star album. In 1976, he released the album Cardiff Rose where he worked with Mick Ronson.

In 1977, he released an LP titled Thunderbyrd, which was also the name of his contemporaneous band. Other members included future John Mayall & the Bluesbreakers and Fleetwood Mac guitarist Rick Vito, future Poco bassist Charlie Harrison and drummer Greg Thomas.

In 1977, McGuinn joined fellow ex-Byrds Gene Clark and Chris Hillman to form McGuinn, Clark & Hillman. The trio recorded an album with Capitol Records in 1979. They performed on many TV rock shows, including repeated performances on The Midnight Special, where they played both new material and Byrds hits. McGuinn's "Don't You Write Her Off" reached No. 33 in April 1979. While some believe that the slick production and disco rhythms didn't flatter the group, it sold well enough to generate a follow-up. McGuinn, Clark and Hillman's second release was to have been a full group effort entitled "City", but Clark's unreliability and drug problems resulted in the billing change on their next LP City to "Roger McGuinn and Chris Hillman, featuring Gene Clark".

Since 1981, McGuinn has regularly toured (primarily playing clubs and small theaters) as a solo singer-guitarist. In 2018 he embarked on a tour with Chris Hillman backed by Marty Stuart and His Fabulous Superlatives in commemoration of the 50th anniversary of the Byrds' Sweetheart of the Rodeo album, after which McGuinn returned to touring solo.

In 1987, McGuinn was the opening act for Dylan and Tom Petty and he performed at Farm Aid.

In 1991 he took part in the Guitar Legends concerts in Seville, Spain as part of the Expo '92 Seville.

After a decade without a recording contract, he released his comeback solo album, Back from Rio in 1991. It included the hit single "King of the Hill", written together with, and featuring, Petty. He returned with a live band featuring John Jorgenson, George Hawkins and Stan Lynch.

In 1992 McGuinn performed at the 30th Anniversary Concert for Bob Dylan with George Harrison, Eric Clapton, Neil Young, Tom Petty, G. E. Smith, and others.

On July 11, 2000, McGuinn testified before a Senate Judiciary Committee hearing that downloading music from the Internet causes artists to not receive the royalties that (non-Internet based) record companies state in contracts and that, to date, the Byrds had not received any royalties for their greatest successes, "Mr. Tambourine Man" and "Turn, Turn, Turn"; they only received advances, which were split five ways and were just "a few thousand dollars" per band member. He also stated that he was receiving 50 percent royalties from MP3.com.

He was also part of an author/musician band, Rock Bottom Remainders, a group of published writers doubling as musicians to raise proceeds for literacy charities. In July 2013, McGuinn co-authored an interactive ebook, Hard Listening, with the rest of the group.

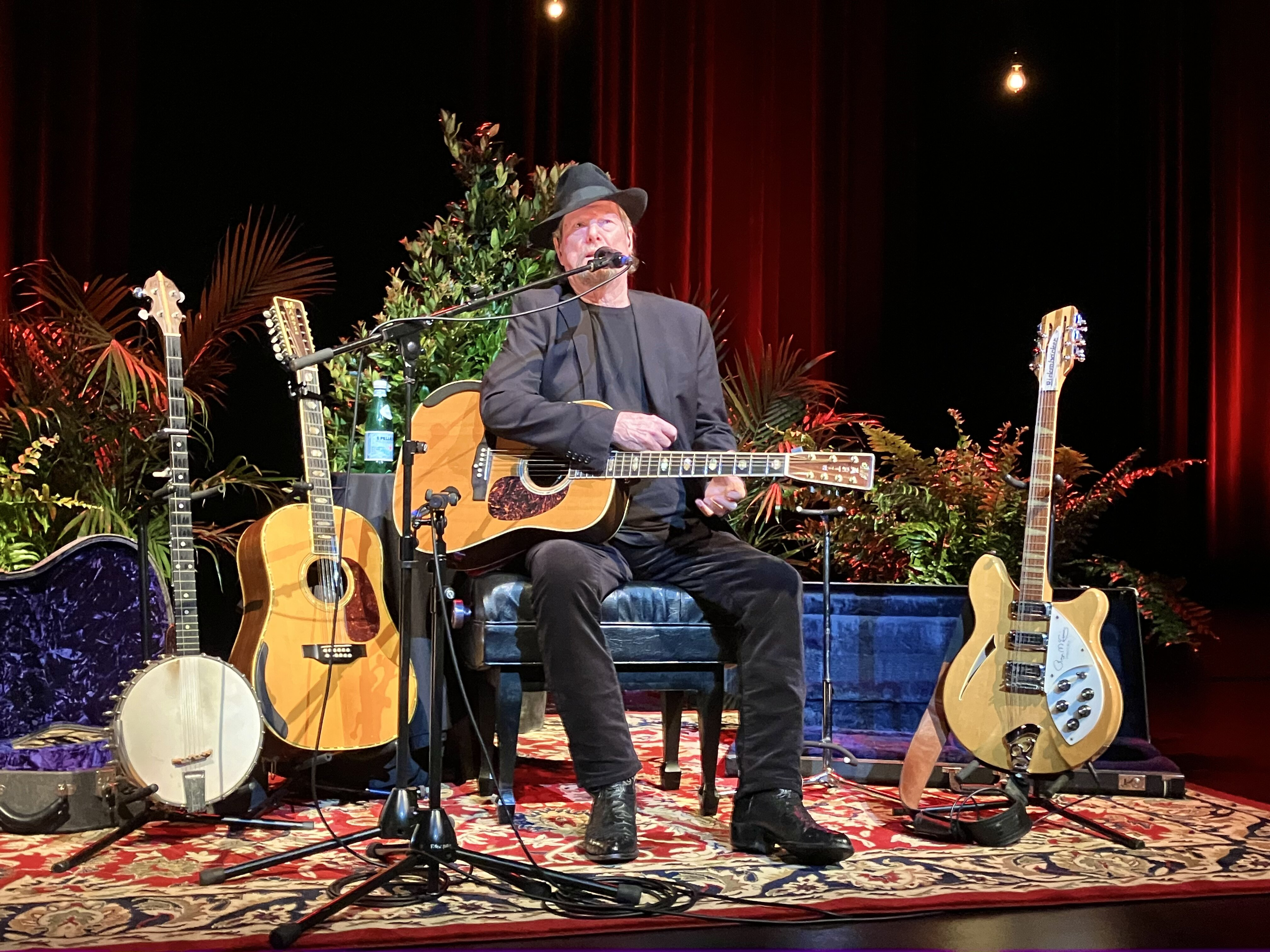
Roger McGuinn solo performing in Florence, South Carolina in 2024.

=== Folk Den ===
McGuinn has used the Internet to continue the folk music tradition by recording a different folk song each month on his Folk Den site. The songs are made available from his Web site, and a selection (with guest vocalists) was released on CD as Treasures from the Folk Den, which was nominated for a Grammy Award in 2002 for Best Traditional Folk Album. In November 2005, McGuinn released a four-CD box set containing one hundred of his favorite songs from the Folk Den.

== Personal life ==
McGuinn married Susan Bedrick in 1963. The marriage was subsequently annulled. From December 1966 to November 1971, he was married to Dolores DeLeon. A fellow adherent of Subud (which he was part of at that time), DeLeon changed her name to Ianthe in 1967 but reverted to her original name after the dissolution of their marriage. With DeLeon, McGuinn fathered two sons, filmmaker Patrick McGuinn and Henry McGuinn. Immediately following their divorce, McGuinn married a third time, to Linda Gilbert in November 1971 but this marriage also ended in divorce in June 1975. In 1977, he met his fourth and current wife and business manager, Camilla and they married in April 1978.

A registered member of the Republican Party, McGuinn donated $2,000 to the Ben Carson presidential campaign in 2015 but refused to endorse Donald Trump, noting "I don't like Trump." He also opposed Prop 1 (an initiative pertaining to the solar energy industry, of which McGuinn is a longtime advocate) and endorsed Prop 2.

== Spirituality and religious views ==
When McGuinn started with the Byrds, he used the name Jim, which he thought to be too plain. He became involved in the Subud spiritual association in 1965 and began to practice the latihan, an exercise in quieting the mind. He changed his name in 1967 upon advice from Subud's founder Bapak. Telling McGuinn that it would better "vibrate with the universe", Bapak sent the letter "R" to McGuinn and asked him to send back ten names starting with that letter. Owing to a fascination with airplanes, gadgets and science fiction, he sent names like "Rocket", "Retro", "Ramjet", and "Roger", the last a term used in signalling protocol over two-way radios, military and civil aviation. Roger was the only "real" name in the bunch, and Bapak chose it. McGuinn officially changed his middle name from Joseph to Roger and has used the name Roger professionally from that time on.

McGuinn left Subud in 1977, and since that time, the McGuinns have practiced evangelical Christianity.

In addition, being the lead singer on the Byrds' song "Mr. Tambourine Man" had a religious aspect for McGuinn during the recording sessions, as he told Johnny Rogan in 1997: "I was singing to God and I was saying that God was the Tambourine Man and I was saying to him, 'Hey, God, take me for a trip and I'll follow you.' It was a prayer of submission."

McGuinn and his wife also do not endorse illicit drugs, stating: "Camilla and I agreed that you can't feel the Holy Spirit when you're high on drugs." In 2018, McGuinn also added that in his view, the current cultural climate that is moving toward eventual legalization of marijuana is wrong, as "It makes people lazy, complacent and fat. It is not a good thing."

== Discography ==
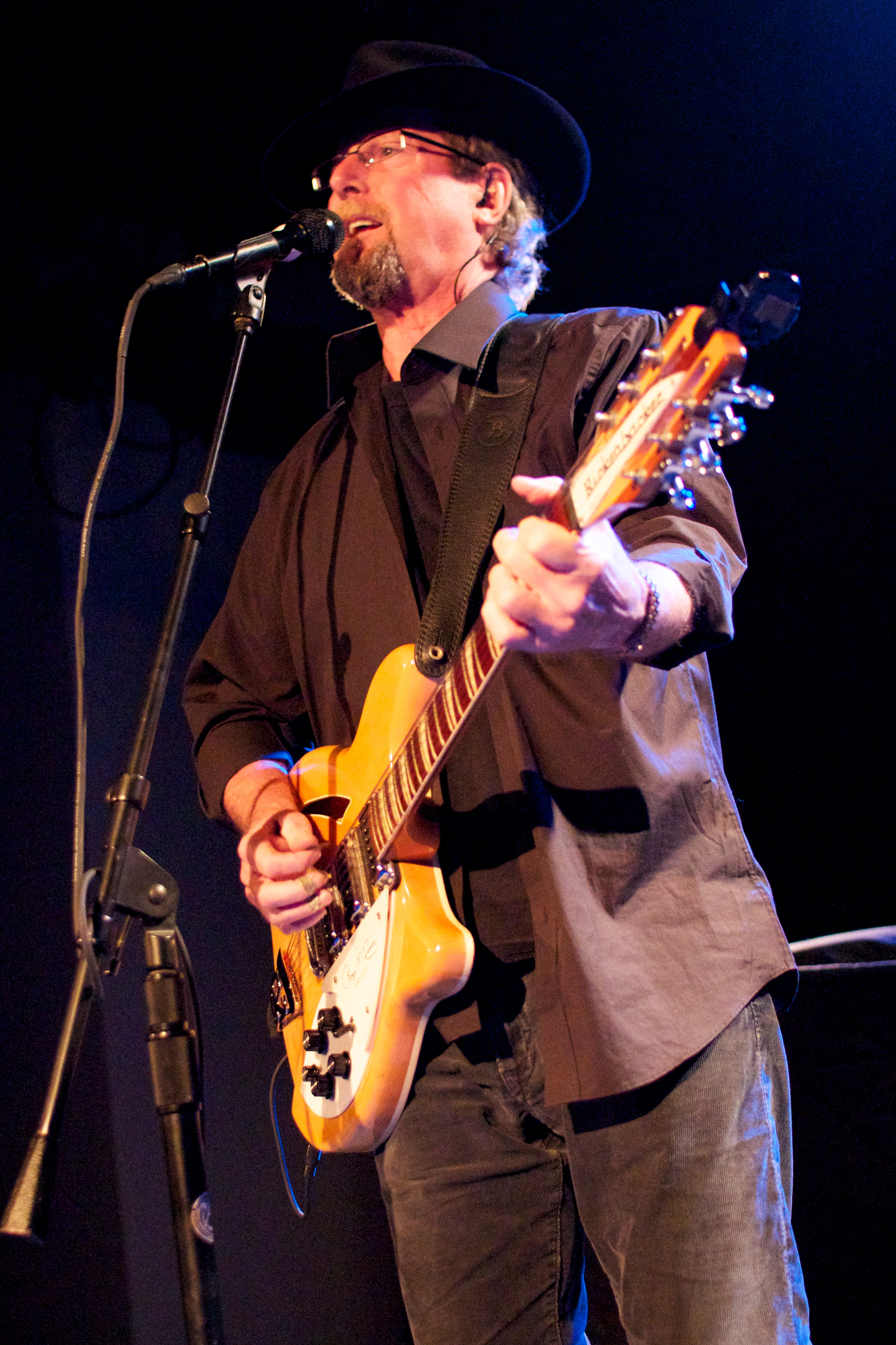
McGuinn performing in 2011

=== Solo ===
==== Studio albums ====
- Roger McGuinn (1973) US #137
- Peace on You (1974) US #92
- Roger McGuinn & Band (1975) US#165
- Cardiff Rose (1976)
- Thunderbyrd (1977)
- Back from Rio (1991) US #44
- Limited Edition (2004)
- CCD (2011)
- Sweet Memories (2018)
- Merry Christmas (2020)

=== With Folk Den Project ===
- McGuinn's Folk Den, Volume 1 (MP3.com download and CD) (1999)
- McGuinn's Folk Den, Volume 2 (MP3.com download and CD) (1999)
- McGuinn's Folk Den, Volume 3 (MP3.com download and CD) (1999)
- McGuinn's Folk Den, Volume 4 (MP3.com download and CD) (2000)
- Treasures from the Folk Den (2001)
- In the Spirit of Love (MP3.com download and CD) (2002)
- The Sea: Songs by Roger McGuinn (MP3.com download and CD) (2003)
- The Folk Den Project, 1995 - 2005 (4-CD set, 2005)
- 22 Timeless Tracks from the Folk Den Project (2008)
- The Folk Den Project: Twentieth Anniversary Edition (4-CD set, 2016)

=== Live albums and compilations ===
- Born to Rock and Roll (1991)
- From The Rock'N Roll Palace Live (McGuinn and Nitty Gritty Dirt Band) (1994)
- Live from Mars (1996)
- 3 Byrds Land in London (with Gene Clark and Chris Hillman, recorded 1977) (1997)
- Live at the XM Studios May 27, 2004 (download only) (2004)
- Live from Spain (2007)
- Stories, Songs, & Friends (2014)
- Live at the Boarding House (with Clark, Hillman, and David Crosby, recorded 1978) (2014)
- Live in New York: Eight Miles High (recorded 1974) (2015)
- Turn Turn Turn (with Hillman, recorded 1980) (2015)
- Bottom Line Archive Series: In Their Own Words (McGuinn and Pete Seeger, recorded 1994) (2015)
- The Living Room Concert '76 (with Thunderbyrd, recorded 1976) (2015)
- Electric Ladyland 1991 (recorded 1991) (2016)
- Backstage Pass (with Clark and Hillman, recorded 1978) (2016)
- Armadillo World Headquarters (with Clark and Hillman, recorded 1979) (2016)

=== Collaborations ===
- McGuinn, Clark & Hillman (1979) (with Gene Clark and Chris Hillman)
- City (1980) (with Chris Hillman, featuring Gene Clark)
- McGuinn – Hillman (1981) (with Chris Hillman)

McGuinn contributes electric 12-string to one track ("Captain Video") on Skip Battin's 1972 self-titled solo album. McGuinn appears on Willie Nile's 1991 Places I Have Never Been album. McGuinn also appears on the 1994 Arthur Alexander tribute album Adios Amigo: A Tribute to Arthur Alexander, performing a cover version of "Anna (Go to Him)". He contributed two tracks, "Banjo Cantata" and "Ramblin' On", to a compilation of banjo pieces released by Davon as Banjo Greats (Volumes 1 & 2), re-issued on CD by Tradition in 1996 as Banjo Jamboree. He has also performed the songs "It's Alright, Ma (I'm Only Bleeding)" and "Ballad of Easy Rider" which were included on the soundtrack of the film Easy Rider. Another soundtrack that features McGuinn is the 1977 film Ransom. McGuinn performed "Shoot 'Em" which appears on the anthology album Byrd Parts 2, released on Australia's Raven Records label in 2003. McGuinn also appears with Bruce Springsteen on the live download "Magic Tour Highlights (Live)" singing "Turn! Turn! Turn!" He also did guitar work in The Beach Boys' version of "California Dreaming" video. McGuinn contributed 12 string electric and harmonies to Will Dailey's track "Peace of Mind" from Torrent, Volume 1: Fashion of Distraction.

=== Singles ===
| Year | Single | Chart positions | | | Album |
| Year | Single | US MSR | US Country | CAN Country | Album |
|---|---|---|---|---|---|
| 1989 | "You Ain't Going Nowhere" (w/ Chris Hillman) | — | 6 | 11 | Will the Circle Be Unbroken: Volume Two (Nitty Gritty Dirt Band album) |
| 1991 | "King of the Hill" | 2 | — | — | Back from Rio |
| 1991 | "Someone to Love" | 12 | — | — | Back from Rio |
