= Cardiff Rose =

Studio album by Roger McGuinn
- Released: May 1976
- Recorded: The Record Plant, Los Angeles
- Genre: Rock
- Length: 36:06
- Label: Columbia
- Producer: Mick Ronson

Roger McGuinn chronology
Roger McGuinn & Band (1975)	Cardiff Rose (1976)	Thunderbyrd (1977)

Professional ratings
Review scores
Source	Rating
AllMusic	link
Christgau's Record Guide	B−
Rolling Stone	(favorable) link

Cardiff Rose is a solo studio album by American singer/songwriter and ex-The Byrds frontman Roger McGuinn, released in 1976. The album, produced by Mick Ronson, was recorded on the heels of Bob Dylan's Rolling Thunder Revue 1975 tour, in which both McGuinn and Ronson had participated. Other key members of the Rolling Thunder Revue were primary contributors: David Mansfield, Rob Stoner, Howie Wyeth, and lyricist Jacques Levy. Levy had previously co-written "Chestnut Mare" with McGuinn, and collaborated with Dylan on the album Desire.

The album includes a pirate tale "Jolly Roger", a song about King Arthur's Round Table, and a version of Joni Mitchell's "Dreamland", which later appeared on her 1977 album Don Juan's Reckless Daughter.

Stylistically, the album varies from traditional sounding folk and sea chanty music (such as the aforementioned "Jolly Roger") to rock songs influenced by the burgeoning punk rock movement (such as "Rock and Roll Time").

== Track listing ==
All titles are written by Roger McGuinn and Jacques Levy except where otherwise noted.

=== Side one ===
1. "Take Me Away" – 3:00
2. "Jolly Roger" – 4:56
3. "Rock and Roll Time" (McGuinn, Kris Kristofferson, Bobby Neuwirth) – 2:46
4. "Friend" (McGuinn) – 2:07
5. "Partners in Crime" – 4:52

=== Side two ===
1. "Up to Me" (Bob Dylan) – 5:36
2. "Round Table" – 4:05
3. "Pretty Polly" (Traditional; Arr. by McGuinn) – 3:17
4. "Dreamland" (Joni Mitchell) – 5:20

=== 2004 CD reissue bonus tracks ===
1. "Soul Love" (Demo recording) (David Bowie) – 3:04
2. "Dreamland" (Live) (Mitchell) – 5:29

== Personnel ==
- Roger McGuinn – acoustic guitar, electric guitar, vocals
- Mick Ronson – acoustic guitar, electric guitar, recorder, accordion, piano, organ, autoharp, percussion, vocals
- David Mansfield – acoustic guitar, electric guitar, steel guitar, mandolin, violin, banjo, organ, percussion
- Rob Stoner – bass, percussion, vocals
- Howie Wyeth – drums, percussion
- Timothy B. Schmit – vocals
- Kim Hutchcroft – saxophone
