= A Dozen Roses – Greatest Hits =

Greatest hits album by The Desert Rose Band
- Released: January 4, 1991
- Genre: Country, country rock
- Length: 39:05
- Label: MCA/Curb
- Producer: Ed Seay; Paul Worley

The Desert Rose Band chronology
| Pages of Life (1990) | A Dozen Roses – Greatest Hits (1991) | True Love (1991) |

A Dozen Roses – Greatest Hits is the first compilation album by American country rock group The Desert Rose Band. It was released January 4, 1991, via MCA/Curb. The album peaked at number 44 on the Top Country Albums chart.

== Critical reception ==
A review of the album in Billboard was positive, calling the album a "bright bouquet".

== Track listing ==
Source: Allmusic

| No. | Title | Writer(s) | Length |
|---|---|---|---|
| 1. | "Love Reunited" | Steve Hill, Chris Hillman | 2:56 |
| 2. | "One Step Forward" | Hillman, Bill Wildes | 3:22 |
| 3. | "He's Back and I'm Blue" | Robert Anderson, Michael Woody | 3:05 |
| 4. | "She Don't Love Nobody" | John Hiatt | 2:56 |
| 5. | "Summer Wind" | Hill, Hillman | 3:26 |
| 6. | "I Still Believe in You" | Hill, Hillman | 3:55 |
| 7. | "Hello Trouble" | Orville Couch, Eddie McDuff | 2:03 |
| 8. | "Start All Over Again" | Hill, Hillman | 4:29 |
| 9. | "Story of Love" | Hill, Hillman | 2:32 |
| 10. | "Will This Be the Day" | Hill, Hillman | 3:26 |
| 11. | "Come a Little Closer" | Hill, Hillman | 3:57 |
| 12. | "Price I Pay" | Hillman, Wildes | 2:58 |

== Reception ==
Professional ratings
Review scores
| Source | Rating |
|---|---|
| Allmusic | link |

The Allmusic review by William Ruhlmann awarded the album 4.5 stars stating

A showcase for [Chris] Hillman's pop-country vocals and the considerable chops of bandmembers such as Herb Pedersen. Together they made some of the best country singles of the late 80s, all collected here.

== Personnel ==
- Bill Brunt – art direction, design
- Bill Bryson – bass guitar
- Annette Cisneros, Dave Glover, Brad Jones, Pete Magdaleno, Ken Paulakovich, Mike Poole, Russ Ragsdale, Clarke Schleicher – assistant engineer
- Steve Duncan – drums, percussion
- Greg Gorman – photography
- Chris Hillman – acoustic guitar, vocals
- John Jorgenson – arranger, acoustic guitar, electric guitar, mandolin, mixing, vocals
- Jim Kemp – art direction
- JayDee Maness – pedal steel
- Glenn Meadows – mastering
- Robert K. Oermann – liner notes
- Herb Pedersen – acoustic guitar, vocals, lead vocals on "Hello Trouble"
- Ed Seay – mixing, producer (except for tracks 1–3)
- Paul Worley – producer

== Chart performance ==
| Chart (1991) | Peak position |
|---|---|
| U.S. Billboard Top Country Albums | 44 |
