= You Can Go Home =

Single by The Desert Rose Band

from the album True Love
- B-side: "Glory and Power"
- Released: September 1991
- Genre: Country, country rock
- Length: 3:33
- Label: MCA/Curb
- Songwriters: Chris Hillman, Jack Tempchin
- Producer: Tony Brown

The Desert Rose Band singles chronology
"Come a Little Closer" (1991)	"You Can Go Home" (1991)	"Twilight is Gone" (1991)

"You Can Go Home" is a song by the American country rock band The Desert Rose Band, which was released in 1991 as the lead single from their fourth studio album True Love. It was written by Chris Hillman and Jack Tempchin, and produced by Tony Brown.

Continuing the band's commercial decline on both the American and Canadian Country Singles Charts, "You Can Go Home" failed to reach the Top 40. The song reached No. 54 on the Billboard Hot Country Songs, and No. 64 on the RPM Country Singles Chart. It also reached No. 35 on the Cash Box Top 100 Country Singles chart.

== Background ==
Although the album initially gained active play, "You Can Go Home" suffered commercially from a lack of airplay in comparison to the band's earlier releases. Speaking to Billboard in August 1993, Hillman spoke of the single's performance in relation to the record company pressure the band endured with the True Love album: "We were mildly seduced by the record company to go into a direction which they felt would break us through. So we compromised on a lot of things. We got resistance at radio on the first single "You Can Go Home", and the record company bailed."

For the True Love album, Curb Records issued a press release which spoke of the song in comparison to the album. They noted that the album "balances elements of traditional country music with bold new ideas", while the songs themselves focus on "adult relationships" and "the heart of country music", adding they have "feelings that come from the heart, but the attitude is one of introspection rather than overt display". The press release stated "The first single illustrates this unique combination of elements with a thoughtful truism expressed as a traditional country hook line: "You can go home (but you can't go back)."

== Release ==
"You Can Go Home" was released by Curb Records in America and Canada only on 7" vinyl, cassette and promotional CD. The 7" vinyl featured the True Love album track "Glory and Power" as the B-side, which was written by Hillman and frequent collaborator Steve Hill. The cassette version featured both tracks on each side, while for the promotional CD single release, "You Can Go Home" was the only track, which came in a standard CD single case with an insert. It was distributed by UNL Distribution Corp.

== Promotion ==
A music video was filmed to promote the single, which was directed by Gustavo Garzón. Licensed under MCA Records, it was produced by ET/VideoLink, a division of Edwards Technology Video, California. The video was shot in mid-1991 at Nashville in Tennessee and Tennessee Railroad Museum in Chattanooga. "You Can Go Home" received medium rotation on the TNN (The Nashville Network), and heavy rotation on CMT (Country Music Television).

== Critical reception ==
Upon release, The Albany Herald stated: "Hillman as lead vocalist easily leads the Desert Rose Band through easy-listening music. "You Can Go Home" could have been a poignant wish for the good, old days, but in Hillman's hands becomes the realization that maybe you shouldn't want to go back to the way it was." Cash Box listed the single as one of their "feature picks" during September 1991. They commented: "This cut is pure Desert Rose Band with its rootsy vocal harmony, country-pop melody and breezy tempo. Definitely a fine kick-off for what sounds like a top-of-the-line album." In a review of True Love, they said the song had a "traditional country sound with a modern day attitude". Billboard commented: "Set to an assertive beat, the band takes a trip back home - but finds only memories intact." Robert Santelli of Asbury Park Press described the song as "an account of what it means to meet up with an old sweetheart".

In the 2007 Italian book 24.000 Dischi (24,000 discs), written by Riccardo Bertoncelli and Cris Thellung, a review of the True Love album highlighted the song, stating "Always open to collaboration with other authors, Hillman signing the opening track, You Can Go Home, with Jack Tempchin. The Desert Rose Band proceeds as a perfect device but a bit too true to itself." Stephen Thomas Erlewine of AllMusic highlighted "You Can Go Home" as an album standout by labeling it an AMG Pick Track.

== Track listing ==
7" single

1. "You Can Go Home" - 3:33
2. "Glory and Power" - 3:24

Cassette single

1. "You Can Go Home" - 3:33
2. "Glory and Power" - 3:24

CD single (American promo)

1. "You Can Go Home" - 3:33

== Chart performance ==
Chart (1991)	Peak position
Canada Country Singles (RPM)	64
US Hot Country Songs (Billboard)	53

== Personnel ==
The Desert Rose Band

- Chris Hillman - Lead vocals, acoustic guitar
- Herb Pedersen - Acoustic guitar, backing vocals
- John Jorgenson - Lead guitar, backing vocals
- Bill Bryson - Bass guitar
- Steve Duncan - Drums
- Tom Brumley - Pedal steel guitar

Additional personnel

- Tony Brown - producer
