= Running (The Desert Rose Band album) =

Studio album by The Desert Rose Band
- Released: September 6, 1988
- Recorded: 1988
- Genre: Country, country rock
- Length: 34:46
- Label: MCA/Curb
- Producer: Ed Seay; Paul Worley

The Desert Rose Band chronology
The Desert Rose Band (1987)	Running (1988)	Pages of Life (1990)

Singles from Running
- 1. "Summer Wind" Released: July 30, 1988; 2. "I Still Believe in You" Released: October 1988; 3. "She Don't Love Nobody" Released: March 1989; 4. "Hello Trouble" Released: July 1989

Professional ratings
Review scores
Source	Rating
AllMusic	4.5/5 stars

Running is the second studio album by American country rock group The Desert Rose Band. It was released September 6, 1988 via MCA/Curb. The album peaked at number 26 on the Top Country Albums chart.

== Song information ==
"Summer Wind" is written about a daughter of divorced parents, who has to live with the frequent absence of her father. Chris Hillman was inspired to write "For the Rich Man" after watching the 1983 film El Norte. Hillman described "Our Songs" as a "tribute to that feeling of the '60s". He added: "I don't see the college kids addressing issues in this country."

"Homeless" tells the story of a woman and her children living on the streets. Hillman told The Tennessean in 1988: "I saw a woman who had the look in her, not of a drug addict or a mental patient, but just of a person. Steve Hill and I concocted a scenario based on that."

== Track listing ==
No.	Title	Writer(s)	Length
1.	"She Don't Love Nobody"	John Hiatt	2:56
2.	"Running"	Steve Hill, Chris Hillman	4:08
3.	"Hello Trouble"	Orville Couch, Eddie McDuff	2:03
4.	"I Still Believe in You"	Hill, Hillman	4:12
5.	"Summer Wind"	Hill, Hillman	3:26
6.	"For the Rich Man"	Hill, Hillman	4:19
7.	"Step on Out"	Hillman, Peter Knobler	2:44
8.	"Homeless"	Hill, Hillman	4:45
9.	"Livin' in the House"	Hill, Hillman	2:47
10.	"Our Songs"	Hill, Hillman	3:26

== Personnel ==
=== The Desert Rose Band ===
- Bill Bryson - bass guitar, background vocals
- Steve Duncan - drums, percussion, background vocals
- Chris Hillman - acoustic guitar, lead vocals
- John Jorgenson - bass guitar, 12-string guitar, acoustic guitar, electric guitar, mandocello, mandolin, background vocals
- JayDee Maness - pedal steel guitar
- Herb Pedersen - banjo, acoustic guitar, background vocals, lead vocals on "Hello Trouble"

== Chart performance ==
Chart (1988)	Peak position
U.S. Billboard Top Country Albums	26
