= Pages of Life (album) =

Studio album by The Desert Rose Band
- Released: January 16, 1990
- Recorded: 1989
- Genre: Country, country rock
- Length: 40:04
- Label: MCA/Curb
- Producer: Ed Seay, Paul Worley

The Desert Rose Band chronology
Running (1988)	Pages of Life (1990)	A Dozen Roses – Greatest Hits (1991)

Singles from Pages of Life
- 1. "Start All Over Again" Released: November 1989; 2. "In Another Lifetime" Released: February 1990; 3. "Story of Love" Released: July 1990

Pages of Life is the third studio album by American country rock group The Desert Rose Band. It was released January 16, 1990, via MCA/Curb, and produced by Paul Worley and Ed Seay.

== Background ==
Upon release, Pages of Life proved to be the Desert Rose Band's most commercially successful album, but also their final charting studio album. Pages of Life peaked at number 17 on the Top Country Albums chart, and was also the band's only album to enter the American Billboard 200 Albums Chart, where it reached number 187. It lasted within the Top 200 for a total of four weeks.

The album spawned three singles. The lead single, "Start All Over Again", peaked at number 6 on the US Hot Country Songs chart and number 3 on the Canada RPM Country Tracks chart. "In Another Lifetime" was the second single, reaching number 13 in the US and number 18 in Canada. The final single, "Story of Love", proved to be the band's final Top 30 single, peaking at number 10 in the US and number 6 in Canada.

Speaking to the Little Rock Gazette in 1990, guitarist John Jorgenson said of the album: "Maybe what happened is that we had a hand in mixing this album, so those rock elements came out a little more. We wanted this one to sound like we do on stage. It's a little more aggressive. The lines in country music are so stretched that it's difficult to say when something is country and something is rock. But people see we have some traditional country roots, even if it's not real obvious." Chris Hillman commented in an MCA press release of the band at this point in their career: ""Start All Over Again" is the result of three year of evolving; it's where we've come to and I think it's a real solid unit. We're a real good band that plays together. We have songs of substance that are played real well - and we have a passion for this music, which you can hear."

== Song information ==
Six of the tracks were written by Hillman and his usual collaborator Steve Hill. "Missing You" was later re-recorded by Hillman and Herb Pedersen for the 2005 various artists compilation Songs for Sophie: A Collings Collective. "Just a Memory" was the only Desert Rose Band song to feature a writing credit to John Jorgenson. "Darkness on the Playground" contained an anti-drug message. The album featured two remakes. "Our Baby's Gone" is a remake of Pedersen's folk song about his daughter which was originally recorded with Emmylou Harris for his 1976 album Southwest, and this song features Pedersen on lead vocal. "Desert Rose", written by Hillman and Bill Wildes, originally appeared on Hillman's 1984 album Desert Rose. In an MCA press release, Hillman described "Story of Love" as "basic 2/4 bluegrass". He added: "But then you take a song like "In Another Lifetime" and you've got John Jorgenson playing guitar like Eric Clapton."

== Promotion ==
During 1990, the band embarked on a tour to promote the album and also spent a week in Las Vegas opening for the Oak Ridge Boys. As a marketing attempt the album cover, as well as the band's publicity photos featured only Hillman, Jorgenson, and Pedersen. Jorgenson explained: "That was some kind of marketing deal, done on the theory that the audience could recall three of us easier than six guys. But the other guys are full-fledged members of the band and they all make a big contribution." A music video was created for "In Another Lifetime", and the band made TV appearances for the three singles, which included such shows as Nashville Now.

== Reception ==
Professional ratings
Review scores
Source	Rating
AllMusic	3/5 stars
Los Angeles Times	3.5/4 stars

Upon release, Randy Lewis of the Los Angeles Times wrote: "Is there a better country-rock band around today than Chris Hillman's? When you listen to the group's sure-footed third album, it's hard to think of any. As the title suggests, there is plenty of meaty material here. Fortunately, it is pages of life, not the whole book, that the band addresses, and by keeping the focus tight, the album succeeds in tackling big issues in modest ways." Ken Rosenbaum of The Toledo Blade commented: "Chris Hillman's group takes the same mixture of country and easy rock that worked for him before and, with some evolution, rides it to the top again. Where it shines the most is in the biting lyrics and dare-to-confront stance of social concern. Pages of Life is a satisfying collection that you'll enjoy giving many readings."

== Track listing ==
No.	Title	Writer(s)	Length
1.	"Story of Love"	Steve Hill, Chris Hillman	2:32
2.	"Start All Over Again"	Hill, Hillman	4:29
3.	"Missing You"	Hillman, Tom Russell, Richard Sellars	3:51
4.	"Just a Memory"	Hillman, John Jorgenson	3:31
5.	"God's Plan"	Hill, Hillman	4:10
6.	"Darkness on the Playground"	Hill, Hillman	4:53
7.	"Our Baby's Gone"	Herb Pedersen	2:44
8.	"Time Passes Me By"	Hill, Hillman	3:01
9.	"Everybody's Hero"	Hillman, Michael Woody	3:18
10.	"In Another Lifetime"	Hill, Hillman	4:50
11.	"Desert Rose"	Hillman, Bill Wildes	2:45

== Personnel ==
Desert Rose Band

- Chris Hillman - lead vocals, acoustic guitar
- Herb Pedersen - acoustic guitar, backing vocals, lead vocals on "Our Baby's Gone"
- John Jorgenson - electric guitar, acoustic guitar, mandolin, backing vocals
- JayDee Maness - pedal steel guitar
- Bill Bryson - bass
- Steve Duncan - drums, percussion

Production

- Ed Seay, Paul Worley - producers

== Charts ==
=== Weekly charts ===
Chart (1990)	Peak position
US Billboard 200	187
US Top Country Albums (Billboard)	17

=== Year-end charts ===
Chart (1990)	Position
US Top Country Albums (Billboard)	48
