= Twilight Is Gone =

Single by The Desert Rose Band

from the album True Love
- B-side: "Shades of Blue"
- Released: 1991
- Genre: Country, country rock
- Length: 3:15 (edited version); 3:40 (album version)
- Label: MCA/Curb
- Songwriters: Chris Hillman, Steve Hill
- Producer: Tony Brown

The Desert Rose Band singles chronology
"You Can Go Home" (1991)	"Twilight Is Gone" (1991)	"What About Love" (1993)

"Twilight Is Gone" is a song by the American country rock band The Desert Rose Band, released in 1991 as the second and final single from their fourth studio album True Love. It was written by Chris Hillman and Steve Hill, and produced by Tony Brown.

Like the preceding single "You Can Go Home", "Twilight Is Gone" continued the band's commercial decline on both the American and Canadian Country Singles Charts. "Twilight Is Gone" peaked at No. 67 on the Billboard Hot Country Songs Chart, and No. 82 on the RPM Country Singles Chart.

== Release ==
"Twilight Is Gone" was released by Records in America and Canada only, on 7" vinyl and as a one-track promotional CD. For its release as a single, "Twilight is Gone" was edited and reduced in duration by almost half a minute. It was dubbed the "Edited Version". The 7" vinyl featured the True Love album track "Shades of Blue" as the B-side, which was written by Hillman and Hill. The single was distributed by UNL Distribution Corp.

== Critical reception ==
Upon release, Cash Box listed the single as one of their "feature picks" during December 1991. They commented: "The chimes of vocal harmony showcased here are near excellent, as well as every ounce of work put into this new single. "Twilight Is Gone," the newest release from the Desert Rose Band's True Love package, unwinds a caressing tune that's quilted with heartwarming lyrics and a mind-sinking melody." Billboard commented: "While tugging at the heartstrings, harmonies explode with color. Lush melody and pristine performance keep all ears pinned."

In a review of True Love, Record-Journal said: "The best songs provide quiet pleasures that grow with repeated listenings, like the acoustic guitar interplay between Herb Pedersen and John Jorgenson on Hillman's ballad "Twilight is Gone"." In a 1993 review of the band's follow-up album Life Goes On, the Los Angeles Times mentioned the song being performed live: "The strongest of the band's catalogue tunes, perhaps because it has been heard the least, was "Twilight Is Gone," the saving grace of the otherwise moribund True Love album. Supported by Pedersen's aching Dobro tones and Bryson's melodic bass lines, Hillman, Pedersen and Bryson's harmonies were nothing short of thrilling." In a press release for the True Love album, issued by Curb Records, the song was described as a "quiet ballad", which spoke of "the changes in a relationship that occur after the initial fire has died down".

== Track listing ==
7" Single

1. "Twilight Is Gone" - 3:15
2. "Shades of Blue" - 3:25

CD Single (US promo)

1. "Twilight Is Gone" - 3:15

== Chart performance ==
Chart (1991)	Peak position
Canada Country Singles (RPM)	82
US Hot Country Songs (Billboard)	67

== Personnel ==
The Desert Rose Band

- Chris Hillman - Lead vocals, acoustic guitar
- Herb Pedersen - Acoustic guitar, backing vocals
- John Jorgenson - Lead guitar, backing vocals
- Bill Bryson - Bass guitar
- Steve Duncan - Drums
- Tom Brumley - Pedal steel guitar

Additional personnel

- Tony Brown - producer
