= The Desert Rose Band (album) =

Studio album by The Desert Rose Band
- Released: June 2, 1987
- Genre: Country, country rock
- Length: 31:19
- Label: MCA/Curb
- Producer: Paul Worley

The Desert Rose Band chronology
The Desert Rose Band (1987)	Running (1988)

Singles from The Desert Rose Band
- 1. "Love Reunited" Released: July 11, 1987; 2. "One Step Forward" Released: October 26, 1987; 3. "He's Back and I'm Blue" Released: February 1988

Professional ratings
Review scores
Source	Rating
Allmusic	4/5 stars

The Desert Rose Band is the debut studio album by the American country rock group The Desert Rose Band. It was released June 2, 1987 via MCA/Curb. The album peaked at #24 on the Top Country Albums chart.

== Track listing ==
No.	Title	Writer(s)	Length
1.	"One Step Forward"	Chris Hillman, Bill Wildes	3:22
2.	"Love Reunited"	Steve Hill, Hillman	2:56
3.	"He's Back and I'm Blue"	Robert Anderson, Michael Woody	3:05
4.	"Leave This Town"	Hillman, Wildes	3:07
5.	"Time Between"	Hillman	2:29
6.	"Ashes of Love"	Jack Anglin, Jim Anglin, Johnnie Wright	3:15
7.	"One That Got Away"	Chris Hillman, Peter Knobler	3:33
8.	"Once More"	Dusty Owens	3:43
9.	"Glass Hearts"	Hill, Hillman	2:55
10.	"Hard Times"	Jon Brandford, Hillman, Wildes	2:54

== Personnel ==
=== The Desert Rose Band ===
- Bill Bryson- bass guitar, background vocals
- Steve Duncan- drums, percussion
- Chris Hillman- acoustic guitar, lead vocals
- John Jorgenson- 6-string bass guitar, acoustic guitar, electric guitar, mandolin, background vocals
- JayDee Maness- pedal steel guitar
- Herb Pedersen- acoustic guitar, background vocals, lead vocals on "Once More"

== Chart performance ==
Chart (1987)	Peak position
U.S. Billboard Top Country Albums	24
