= Come a Little Closer =

Come a Little Closer may refer to:

- "Come a Little Closer" (Dierks Bentley song)
- "Come a Little Closer" (Cage the Elephant song)
- "Come a Little Closer" (The Desert Rose Band song)
- Come a Little Closer (album), an album by Etta James
- "Come a Little Closer", a song from Brandy's album Full Moon
- Come a Little Closer, a 2018 novel by Rachel Abbott

== See also ==
- "Come a Little Bit Closer", a song by Jay and the Americans
