= Mayor of Albany =

Mayor of Albany could refer to:

- List of mayors of the City of Albany, Western Australia, Australia
- List of mayors of Albany, Georgia, U.S.
- List of mayors of Albany, New York, U.S.

== See also ==
- Albany (disambiguation)
