= Will This Be the Day =

Single by The Desert Rose Band

from the album A Dozen Roses – Greatest Hits
- B-side: "Our Baby's Gone"
- Released: January 1991
- Genre: Country, country rock
- Length: 3:26
- Label: MCA/Curb
- Songwriters: Chris Hillman, Steve Hill
- Producers: Ed Seay, Paul Worley

The Desert Rose Band singles chronology
"Story of Love" (1990)	"Will This Be the Day" (1991)	"Come a Little Closer" (1991)

"Will This Be the Day" is a song recorded by American country music group The Desert Rose Band. It was released in January 1991 as the first single from their compilation album A Dozen Roses – Greatest Hits. The song was written by Chris Hillman and Steve Hill, and produced by Ed Seay and Paul Worley.

== Background ==
"Will This Be the Day" marked the beginning of the band's commercial decline on both the American and Canadian Country Singles Charts. It was the band's first single not to make the Top 30 in America and the first in Canada not to reach the Top 40. "Will This Be the Day" peaked at No. 37 on the Billboard Hot Country Songs Chart, and No. 44 on the Canadian RPM Country Singles Chart. The single failed to generate the same level of radio play that the band's previous singles had seen. Speaking to The Journal of Country Music in 1991, Hillman said of the song: "It's not doing as well as any of the other singles."

== Release ==
"Will This Be the Day" was released by Curb Records in America and Canada only on 7-inch vinyl. Although the 7-inch vinyl release had no artwork, it was issued in a standard MCA Records coloured sleeve. The B-side, "Our Baby's Gone", was taken from the band's album Pages of Life.

== Promotion ==
A music video was filmed to promote the single. Licensed under MCA Records, it was directed by Gerry Wenner and produced by ET/VideoLink, a division of Edwards Technology Video, California.

== Critical reception ==
Upon release, Cash Box listed the single as one of their "feature picks" during May 1991. They commented: "When a song makes you feel this good and it causes your entire body to somehow blend with the music, it's gotta be hot! The Desert Rose Band kick off their brand new LP, entitled A Dozen Roses, with this explosion-of-a-tune. "Will This Be the Day" is charged up with racing energy, stellar instrumentation, a little vocal gut-n-grind and of course tremendous harmony – definitely a playlist picker-upper."

In a review of A Dozen Roses – Greatest Hits, CD Review described the song as "country/rock at its finest". Newsday highlighted the "Roger McGuinn-like Rickenbacker guitar chiming" on the track.

== Track listing ==
7" single

1. "Will This Be the Day" – 3:26
2. "Our Baby's Gone" – 2:44

== Personnel ==
The Desert Rose Band

- Chris Hillman – Lead vocals, acoustic guitar
- Herb Pedersen – Acoustic guitar, backing vocals
- John Jorgenson – Lead guitar, backing vocals
- Bill Bryson – Bass guitar
- Steve Duncan – Drums
- Tom Brumley – Pedal steel guitar

Additional personnel

- Paul Worley, Ed Seay – producers

== Charts ==
Chart (1991)	Peak position
Canada Country Singles (RPM)	44
US Hot Country Songs (Billboard)	37
