= What About Love (disambiguation) =

"What About Love" is a song Heart released in 1985.

What About Love may also refer to:

- "What About Love" (Austin Mahone song), 2013
- "What About Love" (The Desert Rose Band song), 1993
- "What About Love" ('Til Tuesday song), 1986
- "What About Love", a song by Banks from the album III
- "What About Love?", a song by Lemar from the album Dedicated
- "What About Love?", a song by Meat Loaf from the album Bat Out of Hell III: The Monster Is Loose
- "What About Love?", a song from the musical The Color Purple
- What About Love, an American romantic drama film starring Sharon Stone and Andy García

== See also ==
- "What About the Love", a 1988 song by Amy Grant
