= True Love (The Desert Rose Band album) =

Studio album by The Desert Rose Band
- Released: October 1, 1991
- Recorded: 1991
- Genre: Country, country rock
- Label: Curb
- Producer: Tony Brown

The Desert Rose Band chronology
A Dozen Roses – Greatest Hits (1991)	True Love (1991)	Life Goes On (1993)

Singles from True Love
- 1. "You Can Go Home" Released: September 1991; 2. "Twilight Is Gone" Released: 1991

Professional ratings
Review scores
Source	Rating
AllMusic	3/5 stars
Record-Journal	B+
The Albany Herald	favorable

True Love is the fourth album by the country rock band The Desert Rose Band, released in 1991. The album was released by the Curb record label, failing to make an impact on the American Country charts.

The track "Undying Love" featured a special guest appearance by Alison Krauss.

Two singles were released from the album, "You Can Go Home" and "Twilight Is Gone". "You Can Go Home" was released in 1991, peaking at number 53 on the U.S. Hot Country Singles chart. A music video was created for the single, directed by Gustavo Garzon. "Twilight Is Gone" was released in 1992, peaking at number 67 on the U.S. Hot Country Singles chart. No music video was created for the single.

== Background ==
At the request of MCA, the band had attempted to record an album that would be even more commercially appealing than the band's previous work. Despite this, True Love proved to be the Desert Rose Band's first album to fail to enter the Billboard Top Country Albums chart. After the album's failure, along with the limited success of its singles, leading member Chris Hillman spoke of his regret over the album and its direction to Billboard in 1994: "Any disgruntled artist can point fingers, but we were mildly seduced by the record company to go in a direction which they thought would break us through. So we compromised on a lot of things, and while it wasn't a complete disaster, it wasn't a good album. We got resistance at radio, and the record company bailed."

He told the Los Angeles Times in 1993: "I made one of the most monumental blunders anybody can make, I stopped listening to my intuitive voice, the voice that says: "Don't do that, don't write that." I was seduced by the business side of it with all this stuff. I was doing every stupid thing, like a 20-year-old kid thinking "Gee, they're gonna really get behind it." I fooled myself."

== Track listing ==
1. "You Can Go Home" - 3:33 (Chris Hillman; Jack Tempchin)
2. "It Takes a Believer" - 3:34 (Hillman; Michael Woody)
3. "Twilight is Gone" - 3:40 (Hillman; Steve Hill)
4. "No One Else" - 3:19 (Hillman; Herb Pedersen)
5. "A Matter of Time" - 4:02 (Hillman)
6. "Undying Love" - 2:47 (Peter Rowan)
7. "Behind These Walls" - 3:23 (Hillman; Woody)
8. "True Love" - 3:07 (Hillman; Hill)
9. "Glory and Power" - 3:25 (Hillman; Hill)
10. "Shades of Blue" - 3:26 (Hillman; Hill)

== Personnel ==
The Desert Rose Band

- Chris Hillman - lead vocals, acoustic guitar
- Herb Pedersen - dobro, acoustic guitar, background vocals, lead vocals on "No One Else"
- John Jorgenson - acoustic guitar, electric guitar, mandolin, background vocals
- Bill Bryson - bass guitar
- Steve Duncan - drums, percussion

Additional Musicians

- Skip Edwards - keyboards
- Paul Franklin - steel guitar

Production

- Tony Brown - producer
- Scott MacPherson - engineer
- John Guess - mixing
- Glenn Meadows - mastering

Other

- Bill Brunt, Jim Kemp - art direction
- Greg Gorman - photography
