= Head in the Clouds (film) =

- Theatrical release poster
- Directed by: John Duigan
- Written by: John Duigan
- Produced by: Michael Cowan; Bertil Ohlsson; Jonathan Olsberg; Jason Piette; Maxime Rémillard; André Rouleau
- Starring: Charlize Theron; Penélope Cruz; Stuart Townsend; Thomas Kretschmann
- Narrated by: Stuart Townsend
- Cinematography: Paul Sarossy
- Edited by: Dominique Fortin
- Music by: Terry Frewer
- Production company: Arclight Films
- Distributed by: Alliance Atlantis Vivafilm (Canada); Columbia TriStar Film Distributors International (United Kingdom)
- Release dates: 12 September 2004 (TIFF); 17 September 2004 (United States)
- Running time: 121 minutes Toronto International Film Festival; 132 minutes (United States)
- Countries: Canada; United Kingdom
- Languages: English; French
- Box office: $3.5 million

Head in the Clouds is a 2004 Canadian-British war drama film written and directed by John Duigan. The original screenplay focuses on the choices young lovers must make as they find themselves surrounded by increasing political unrest in late-1930s Europe. The film was a critical and box office failure.

== Plot ==
In Paris in the year 1924, a young 14-year-old Gilda Bessé, the daughter of a French aristocrat and an emotionally unstable American mother, is told by a fortune teller that the life line on her palm does not extend past the age of 34. Years later, on a rainy night in 1933, Gilda stumbles into the room of Guy Malyon, an Irishman who is a first-year scholarship student at Cambridge University. She has had a lover's quarrel with one of the dons, and rather than turn her out into the storm, Guy gallantly allows her to spend the night. Later, they become lovers, but the two are separated when Gilda's mother dies and she opts to leave England. A few years later, Guy sees her as an extra in a Hollywood film, and shortly after he coincidentally receives a letter from her inviting him to visit her in Paris, where she is working as a photographer.

Guy discovers that Gilda is living with the Spanish-born nursing student/model Mia and has a lover, whom she quickly discards when Guy moves in. The trio are enjoying their unusual living arrangement, but world events are beginning to affect their existence. It is the height of the Spanish Civil War, and the idealistic Guy, a long-time supporter of the army of the Second Spanish Republic, is determined to do what he can to help them as Francisco Franco's nationalists gain strength. Mia, too, is anxious to come to the aid of her native land. Gilda, however, has no interest in politics or anything else that might disrupt her life of luxury, and pleads with the two to ignore the conflict, but they feel compelled to act and depart for Spain.

By January 1938, Guy becomes a soldier, while Mia becomes a nurse and tends to the wounded. They cross paths one night and, before sleeping with Guy, Mia confesses she was Gilda's lover. In the morning, her ambulance is destroyed by a land mine, resulting in Mia's death as well as the ambulance driver's. A few months later in July 1938, Guy returns to Paris, where he is ignored by Gilda, who feels his abandonment of her was a form of betrayal.

Six years later, Guy is working as a spy with the underground in occupied Paris under the auspices of British intelligence. He learns that Gilda has taken Nazi Major Franz Bietrich as a lover and visits her in their old apartment, where the two make love. The following morning, she tells him their affair is over and the two can never see each other again. D-Day is approaching, and Guy throws himself into his work. One day he arrives at a café to meet a contact, but instead is approached by Gilda, who has overheard her German lover plotting a trap and has come to help him escape in cleric's clothing she has concealed in the restaurant's washroom. That night, he and his associates destroy a rail station, but only Guy manages to elude the German soldiers.

Guy returns to London, where he discovers Gilda joined the Resistance a few years earlier. With the occupation of Paris having come to an end, he realizes that the locals, who had long regarded Gilda as a Nazi sympathizer and traitor, will seek revenge. As he returns to Paris to find her, Guy is unaware that Bietrich has been killed in Gilda's apartment and that she has been taken captive by a mob intent on avenging the deaths of their loved ones. She is finally killed by a local Resistance fighter to avenge the death of his sister, whom Bietrich killed. In Gilda's ransacked apartment, Guy reads the last letter written by her to him.

== Cast ==
- Charlize Theron as Gilda Bessé
  - Jolyane Langlois as 14 Year old Gilda
- Penélope Cruz as Mia
- Stuart Townsend as Guy Malyon
- Thomas Kretschmann as Sturmbannführer (Major) Franz Bietrich
- Steven Berkoff as Charles Bessé
- David La Haye as Lucien
- Karine Vanasse as Lisette
- Gabriel Hogan as Julian Elsworth
- John Jorgensen as Django Reinhardt
- Christine Solomon as Parisian Woman #2

== Production ==
The film was shot in London, Cambridge, Montreal, and Paris.

The soundtrack included "Parlez-moi d'amour" by Jean Lenoir, "Blue Drag" by Josef Myrow, "Minor Swing" by Stéphane Grappelli and Django Reinhardt, "Big Jim Blues" by Harry Lawson and Mary Lou Williams, "La rumba d'amour" by Simon Rodriguez, "Vous qui passez sans me voir" by Charles Trenet and Jean Sablon, "My Girl's Pussy" by Harry Roy and performed by John Duigan and "La litanie à la vierge" by Francis Poulenc.

The film featured John Jorgenson as Django Reinhardt; Jorgenson was discovered by the film's music coordinator and consultant, Scottpatrick Sellitto. His reproduction of Django's playing was applauded throughout the world by many critics and the media. This led to the formation of the John Jorgenson Quintet. The score was by Terry Frewer and won best score award in the 2005 Genie Awards.

The film opened on ten screens in the United States and earned $46,133 its opening weekend. It grossed a total of $398,278 in the US and Canada and $3,112,327 in other markets for a total worldwide box office of $3,510,605.

== Critical reception ==
Head in the Clouds received negative reviews. On the review aggregator website Rotten Tomatoes, the film holds an approval rating of 18% based on 90 reviews, with an average rating of 4.7/10. The website's critical consensus says "Head in the Clouds aspires to soapy melodrama, but gets lost in its own lather, never mining romance from its central love affair or achieving authenticity in its period setting." In his review in The New York Times, Stephen Holden said, "The strength of [Charlize Theron's] go-for-broke performance only underlines the weaknesses of the film . . . [which] plays like an entertaining compilation of Hollywood's favorite World War II clichés" and added, "Could it be that Hollywood's six decades of replaying the Good War has left us with nobility fatigue? At least Head in the Clouds is not the debacle of Charlotte Gray and other epic-manqués. But if World War II is to continue to mean anything anymore, it has to be reimagined as a real event, not a deluxe, romantically spiced-up newsreel."

Roger Ebert of the Chicago Sun-Times said the film "is silly and the plot is preposterous, but it labors under no delusions otherwise. It wants to be a hard-panting melodrama, with spies and sex and love and death, and there are times when a movie like this is exactly what you feel like indulging."

In the San Francisco Chronicle, Walter Addiego called it "a glossy, stiff melodrama . . . a mixture of Casablanca and Cabaret, or possibly Hemingway and Henry Miller, and finally, it doesn't work, in part because the erotic content seems self-conscious and force-fit. In fact, if not for the presence of Charlize Theron, it's hard to imagine this film would have attracted anywhere near the kind of attention it's gotten . . . she's not at all bad, but her role as a young American heiress and libertine feels recycled from scores of other movies."

Peter Travers of Rolling Stone awarded it one out of a possible four stars and described it as "a World War II melodrama of epic silliness and supreme vapidity . . . This spark-free film has no place to go on [the cast's] resumes except under the heading of Cringing Embarrassment."

== Awards and nominations ==
- Genie Award for Best Achievement in Cinematography (Paul Sarossy, winner)
- Genie Award for Best Achievement in Costume Design (Mario Davignon, winner)
- Genie Award for Best Achievement in Music - Original Score (Terry Frewer, winner)
- Genie Award for Best Achievement in Editing (Dominique Fortin, winner)
- Genie Award for Best Achievement in Art Direction/Production Design (Jonathan Lee and Gilles Aird, nominees)
- Genie Award for Best Achievement in Overall Sound (Pierre Blain, Michel Descombes, Gavin Fernandes, and Marcel Pothier, nominees)
- Genie Award for Best Achievement in Sound Editing (Guy Pelletier, Marcel Pothier, Guy Francoeur, Antoine Morin, and Natalie Fleurant, nominees)
- Canadian Society of Cinematographers Award for Best Cinematography in a Theatrical Feature (Sarossy, winner)
- Jutra Award for Best Costume Design (Davignon, nominee)
- Milan International Film Festival Award for Best Film (winner)
