= Come a Little Closer (The Desert Rose Band song) =

Single by The Desert Rose Band

from the album A Dozen Roses – Greatest Hits
- B-side: "Everybody's Hero"
- Released: May 1991
- Genre: Country, country rock
- Length: 3:10 (edited version); 4:00 (album version)
- Label: Curb Records
- Songwriters: Chris Hillman, Steve Hill
- Producers: Ed Seay, Paul Worley

The Desert Rose Band singles chronology
"Will This Be the Day" (1991)	"Come a Little Closer" (1991)	"You Can Go Home" (1991)

"Come a Little Closer" is a song by the American country rock band The Desert Rose Band, which was released in 1991 as the second and final single from their first compilation album A Dozen Roses – Greatest Hits. It was written by Chris Hillman and Steve Hill, and produced by Ed Seay and Paul Worley.

"Come a Little Closer" marked a continuation of the band's commercial decline on both the American and Canadian Country Singles Chart. Earlier in 1991, "Will This Be the Day" had entered the US Top 40, but "Come a Little Closer" was the band's first single not to reach the Top 40 in either America or Canada. It peaked at No. 65 on the Billboard Hot Country Songs Chart and No. 67 on the Canadian RPM Country Singles Chart.

== Release ==
"Come a Little Closer" was released by Curb Records in America and Canada only, on 7" vinyl and as a one-track promotional CD. For release as a single, the album version of "Come a Little Closer" was edited and reduced by almost a minute in duration. It was dubbed the "Edited Version". The B-side on the 7" vinyl, "Everybody's Hero", was taken from the band's Pages of Life album.

== Promotion ==
No music video was created to promote the single, however a live performance of the song would later be professionally filmed in Aspecta, Kumamoto, Japan, on October 18, 1992.

== Critical reception ==
Upon release, Cash Box listed the single as one of their "feature picks" during May 1991. They commented: "What a band, what a sound, what a song! The Desert Rose Band has successfully managed to create its own recognizable sound, and with its latest release, the sound undoubtedly sparks a best yet! With a driving hit-n-go pulse and a plead-of-love theme, the band delivers an unusual "live" approach with "Come a Little Closer". In addition to an expected fire-tinged harmony blend, this spicy number lends time for a commanding instrumental performance." In a review of True Love, they said the song had a "traditional country sound with a modern day attitude". Billboard commented: "Desert Rose Band leans in the direction of pop/rock with this crisply sung number. Rock guitar licks are showered throughout."

In a review of A Dozen Roses – Greatest Hits, CD Review said: ""Come a Little Closer" ranks as one of Hillman and Hill's best compositions. Crafty and commercial, the Desert Rose Band offers a seamless blend of country and rock styles..." Randy Lewis of the Los Angeles Times described the song as a "driving rocker", but added ""Come a Little Closer," teeters too close to rock cliche for comfort, something this group avoids for the most part." The Milwaukee Journal Sentinel described the track as a "country rock/reggae fusion tune." The Fresno Bee, said of the compilation album: "The best of the bunch on this collection are "Come a Little Closer" and "Price I Pay"."

== Track listing ==
7" Single

1. "Come a Little Closer" - 3:10
2. "Everybody's Hero" - 3:17

CD Single (American promo)

1. "Come a Little Closer" - 3:10

== Chart performance ==
Chart (1991)	Peak position
Canada Country Singles (RPM)	67
US Hot Country Songs (Billboard)	65

== Personnel ==
The Desert Rose Band

- Chris Hillman - Lead vocals, acoustic guitar
- Herb Pedersen - Acoustic guitar, backing vocals
- John Jorgenson - Lead guitar, backing vocals
- Bill Bryson - Bass guitar
- Steve Duncan - Drums
- Tom Brumley - Pedal steel guitar

Additional personnel

- Paul Worley, Ed Seay - producers
