= Story of Love =

Single by The Desert Rose Band

from the album Pages of Life
- B-side: "Darkness on the Playground"
- Released: July 1990
- Genre: Country, country rock, country pop
- Length: 2:32
- Label: MCA/Curb
- Songwriters: Chris Hillman, Steve Hill
- Producers: Paul Worley, Ed Seay

The Desert Rose Band singles chronology
"In Another Lifetime" (1990)	"Story of Love" (1990)	"Will This Be the Day" (1991)

"Story of Love" is a song written by Chris Hillman and Steve Hill, and recorded by American country music group The Desert Rose Band. The song was produced by Paul Worley and Ed Seay, and released in July 1990 as the third and final single from the band's third studio album Pages of Life.

== Background ==
"Story of Love", as the third single release Pages of Life, proved to be the Desert Rose Band's final single to reach the Top 30 on either the American Billboard Hot Country Songs Chart or the Canadian RPM Country Singles Chart. It peaked at number 10 on the Billboard Hot Country Songs Chart and number 6 on Canada's RPM Country Singles Chart. In a Curb Records press release for Pages of Life, Hillman described the song as "basic 2/4 bluegrass". To promote the song, the band performed "Story of Love" live on Nashville Now.

In 1997, a re-recorded version of the song was included on Out of the Woodwork, a collaborative album between Hillman, Herb Pedersen, Tony Rice and Larry Rice (Rice, Rice, Hillman & Pedersen). The album included another re-recorded Desert Rose Band track, "No One Else" from 1991's True Love.

== Critical reception ==
Upon release, Billboard commented: "Distinctive vocals gently carry the listener through chapters in the "Story Of Love", a favored single from this golden-throated band. Instrumentation and production glisten perfectly." The Orlando Sentinel noted the song's "soft little [hook]" in a review of Pages of Life. The Milwaukee Journal Sentinel commented: "Especially good are Hillman's statement of faith in love, "Story of Love"." The Toledo Blade noted: "Not all tracks are designed to test your conscience, because "Story of Love" and "Missing You" are country-rock gems designed for listening pleasure, not reflection."

== Track listing ==
7" single

1. "Story of Love" - 2:32
2. "Darkness on the Playground" - 4:51

7" single (American/Canadian promo)

1. "Story of Love" - 2:32
2. "Story of Love" - 2:32

== Personnel ==
- Chris Hillman - lead vocals, acoustic guitar
- Herb Pedersen - acoustic guitar, backing vocals
- John Jorgenson - lead guitar, backing vocals
- Jay Dee Maness - pedal steel guitar
- Bill Bryson - bass
- Steve Duncan - drums

Production

- Paul Worley, Ed Seay - producer

== Charts ==
=== Weekly charts ===
Chart (1990)	Peak position
Canada Country Singles (RPM)	6
US Hot Country Songs (Billboard)	10

=== Year-end charts ===
Chart (1990)	Position
Canada Country Tracks (RPM)	88
