= Jason Anick =

American jazz musician and composer

- Born: October 3, 1985 (age 40); Framingham, Massachusetts United States
- Genres: Jazz, World music
- Occupations: Musician, composer, educator
- Instruments: Violin, mandolin
- Website: Official website

Jason Anick (born October 3, 1985, Framingham, Massachusetts) is an American jazz violinist, mandolin player and composer. He currently resides in Boston, Massachusetts, and teaches at the Berklee College of Music.

== Early life ==
Anick started classical violin lessons at age six but it was the summers spent learning fiddle tunes from his father that trained his ear and liberated him early on from the printed page. He was eleven when he met Stephane Grappelli and twelve when he fiddled for President and Mrs. Clinton when they showed up at a fiddle showcase on Martha's Vineyard. In junior high school, he took a detour and started a rock band on guitar, but videos of European Gypsy jazz players piqued a renewed fascination with the violin – and a passion for jazz. He entered the unique "acoustics and music" program at the University of Hartford, combining an engineering degree with music performance studies at the Jackie McLean Institute of Jazz, part of the Hartt School. There he worked with the likes of trombonist Steve Davis and bassist Nat Reeves to hone his straight-ahead and bebop chops. He was still attending college when guitarist John Jorgenson invited him to join his Quintet, having seen a YouTube video of Anick playing at the Montreal Jazz Festival with the Robin Nolan Trio. Anick managed to complete school while touring with Jorgenson, beginning a professional relationship that has lasted for six years. The apprenticeship allowed him to hone his improvisational skills and stage presence while earning him a reputation as one of the top Gypsy jazz/world music violinists on the scene today. He has recorded one CD with the John Jorgenson Quintet, One Stolen Night.

== Career ==
In 2011, Anick released his first solo CD, Sleepless. A modern take on the Gypsy jazz genre, it mixed new arrangements of classic Hot Club tunes with a half dozen original compositions which reflected Jason's penchant for creating musical "short stories". Jason's melodic approach to improvising and his facility for blending traditional and modern jazz sensibilities caught the ear of Berklee College of Music's string department, who hired him as one of the youngest members of the Boston faculty. He currently teaches jazz violin and mandolin, history of jazz violin, and "Django ensemble" while maintaining a busy schedule performing as guest artist and band leader in a range of projects. These include the modern jazz ensemble "Jason Anick Quartet", "Rhythm Future Quartet", a progressive Gypsy jazz ensemble featuring guitarists Olli Soikkeli and Vinny Raniolo (of Frank Vignola Trio), and the "New Hot Club of America" an homage to the original Hot Club of France with guitarist Gonzalo Bergara and fellow violinists Ben Powell and Leah Zeger. He also continues to tour with the John Jorgenson Quintet. In 2014, Anick released his second CD as band leader, Tipping Point Backed up by piano, sax, bass and drums, this presents Anick in a modern jazz context as violin/mandolin player, composer and arranger.

== Discography ==
- 2011 Sleepless (Jason Anick)
- 2012 One Stolen Night (John Jorgenson Quintet)
- 2013 The New Hot Club of America (with Gonzalo Bergara)
- 2014 Tipping Point (Jason Anick)
