= Life Goes On (The Desert Rose Band album) =

Studio album by The Desert Rose Band
- Released: September 21, 1993
- Recorded: 1993
- Genre: Country, country rock
- Label: Curb
- Producer: Paul Worley, Ed Seay

The Desert Rose Band chronology
| True Love (1991) | Life Goes On (1993) |

Singles from Life Goes On
- 1. "What About Love" Released: July 26, 1993

Professional ratings
Review scores
| Source | Rating |
|---|---|
| AllMusic | 4.5/5 stars |
| 24.000 Dischi | 3/5 stars |
| The Virgin Encyclopedia of Country Music | 2/5 stars |

Life Goes On is the fifth and final album by the country rock band The Desert Rose Band, released by Curb in 1993. The album, produced by Paul Worley and Ed Seay, was the only one from the band not to be issued in North America.

The album's lead single, "What About Love", reached No. 71 on the US Billboard Hot Country Songs chart.

== Background ==
Following the commercial failure of their fourth studio album, True Love, the Desert Rose Band were dropped by MCA in 1992, while both original guitarist John Jorgenson and drummer Steve Duncan departed the band during this time. After a period of uncertainty over their future, the remaining band members, including leading member Chris Hillman, decided to continue and record a new album. Speaking to Billboard in 1993, Hillman said: "I was sitting here with Bill and Herb and Tom, and asking, "Is this it? Should I go solo?" But I couldn't let us go out with True Love, and we owed Curb two records. So we worked things out with Curb country's division president Dick Whitehouse, and now that Curb has its own distribution and (country artist) Hal Ketchum's doing miracles for the label, I said, "You have every opportunity to be a major label. Let's make a record"."

For their new album, the band returned to the production team of Paul Worley and Ed Seay, who had produced the band's first three LPs, while Jorgenson also returned to play on two tracks. The remaining tracks featured guitarist Jeff Ross, although he was replaced by Jim Monahan for the following tour, while the touring drummer position was filled by Tim Grogan. Several prominent country and bluegrass musicians made guest appearances on the album, who were also close friends of Hillman, including guitarist Tony Rice, fiddle player Sam Bush, dobro player Al Perkins and guitarist Larry Park (of Boy Howdy).

Hillman told Billboard about the album: "We've worked on the road and built a good core following, and could remain working without a record, so we took our time putting the new album together. The songs and the vocal blend which Herb and I get are even more focused, but we've just furthered the unique sound we have." Speaking to the Los Angeles Times, he added: "I want to get us back into the majors, we were relegated to the minor leagues. I think we [have made] a really good record. We went back with our original producers, and it's far more Desert Rose-sounding than any of the other records."

The album's lead single, "What About Love", was released in July 1993 and reached No. 71 on the US Billboard Hot Country Songs chart. Due to its limited success, Life Goes On was released only in Europe, in September 1993. Reflecting on the country music scene of the time, Hillman stated: "It's a volatile business right now. It's becoming so disposable. What was once an artistic business has somehow become a commodities business." Deciding that the Desert Rose Band had run their course, Hillman disbanded the group on March 1, 1994, one week after they played their final gig in Indio, California. Following the split, Hillman took a break from the music business, until he was ready to record again.

Recalling the album to Billboard in 1996, Hillman said: "It wasn't a bad record, but Curb, in all its wisdom, put it out only in Europe and the Orient. Original band members John Jorgenson and Jay Dee Maness had already left, so we'd lost the essence of the original ensemble – and our shelf life had expired. If we had kept going, we'd have ended up doing USO tours and Vegas lounges – things we didn't want to do! So we laid out a situation for Curb where we'd do a 'retirement party' in L.A., and maybe film it for TNN and gracefully say adios – but they didn't go for it."

== Track listing ==
1. "What About Love" - 3:18 (Chris Hillman; Steve Hill)
2. "Night After Night" - 3:21 (Chris Hillman; Michael Woody)
3. "Walk on By" - 2:55 (Chris Hillman; R. Alan Thornhill)
4. "Love's Refugees" - 3:25 (Chris Hillman; Steve Hill)
5. "Life Goes On" - 3:20 (Chris Hillman; Herb Pedersen)
6. "That's Not the Way" - 3:49 (Chris Hillman; Michael Woody)
7. "Till It's Over" - 3:07 (Chris Hillman; Steve Hill)
8. "Hold On" - 3:54 (Herb Pedersen)
9. "Little Rain" - 2:50 (Chris Hillman; Steve Hill)
10. "Throw Me a Lifeline" - 3:13 (Chris Hillman; Steve Hill)
