= In Another Lifetime =

Single by The Desert Rose Band

from the album Pages of Life
- B-side: "Just a Memory"
- Released: February 1990
- Genre: Country, country rock
- Length: 3:28 (edited version); 4:50 (album version)
- Label: MCA/Curb
- Songwriters: Chris Hillman, Steve Hill
- Producers: Paul Worley, Ed Seay

The Desert Rose Band singles chronology
"Start All Over Again" (1989)	"In Another Lifetime" (1990)	"Story of Love" (1990)

"In Another Lifetime" is a song recorded by American country music group The Desert Rose Band. It was released in February 1990 as the second single from the band's third studio album Pages of Life. The song was written by Chris Hillman and Steve Hill, and produced by Paul Worley and Ed Seay.

"In Another Lifetime" peaked at number 13 on the American Billboard Hot Country Songs Chart, and number 18 on Canada's RPM Country Singles Chart. In a 1990 Curb Records press release, Hillman noted the song featured Jorgenson "playing guitar like Eric Clapton."

== Promotion ==
The song's music video was directed by Bill Pope. It was produced by ET/VideoLink, a division of Edwards Technology Video. On March 1, 1990, the band performed the song live on Nashville Now.

== Critical reception ==
Upon release, Mike Weatherford of The Durant Daily Democrat commented: "Traditional [country] the band may be, but its last single, "In Another Lifetime," could have been released by The Eagles in their heyday." The San Jose Mercury News commented: "The rock edge of "In Another Lifetime" provides a provocative hint as to the range that country rock can achieve."

In 2010, Randy Lewis of the Los Angeles Times said of the song: "What made the group's approach such a treat a quarter-century ago was the way the players started with the impeccable instrumental and vocal chops common to bluegrass and infused them with a pronounced jolt of rock energy. It also brought the folk-rock singer-songwriter ethos to many of their songs. "In Another Lifetime" puts forth the questions, "Have I lived through the best of times?/Have I hurt anyone?," weaving in a level of self-reflection that hasn't always been at the forefront of the Country genre."

== Track listing ==
7" single

1. "In Another Lifetime" - 4:50
2. "Just a Memory" - 3:31

7" single (American/Canadian promo)

1. "In Another Lifetime" - 3:28
2. "In Another Lifetime" - 4:50

Cassette single

1. "In Another Lifetime" - 4:50
2. "Just a Memory" - 3:31

== Personnel ==
- Chris Hillman - lead vocals, acoustic guitar
- Herb Pedersen - acoustic guitar, backing vocals
- John Jorgenson - lead guitar, backing vocals
- Jay Dee Maness - pedal steel guitar
- Bill Bryson - bass
- Steve Duncan - drums

'Production

- Paul Worley, Ed Seay - producers

== Charts ==
Chart (1990)	Peak position
Canada Country Singles (RPM)	18
US Hot Country Songs (Billboard)	13
