= James H. Gray Sr. =

American politician

Mayor of Albany, Georgia
- In office January 2, 1974 – September 19, 1986
- Preceded by: Motie Wiggins
- Succeeded by: Wm. Larry Bays

Personal details
- Born: James Harrison Gray; May 17, 1916 Westfield, Massachusetts, U.S.
- Died: September 19, 1986 (aged 70) Boston, Massachusetts, U.S.
- Party: Democratic
- Spouse: Cleair Ranger
- Children: 3
- Education: Dartmouth College; University of Heidelberg

James Harrison Gray Sr. (May 17, 1916 – September 19, 1986) was a Georgia politician and Democratic chairman. He was the founder of Gray Communications Systems, Inc., the editor and publisher of The Albany Herald and the mayor of Albany, Georgia.

== Early life ==
Gray was born in Westfield, Massachusetts. He graduated from Dartmouth College and also studied at the University of Heidelberg. He was a member of the United States Army and trained at Fort Benning near Columbus, Georgia in World War II before moving to Albany, Georgia in 1946.

== Businessman and politician ==
In 1946, Gray founded Gray Communications Systems, Inc., and became editor and publisher of The Albany Herald, an evening and Sunday paper he purchased in Albany, Georgia. In 1954, Gray launched WALB-TV, one of the oldest television stations in the state outside Atlanta.

In 1960, Gray was named state chairman for the Democratic Party of Georgia. During the 1960 Democratic National Convention, Gray led a movement to replace Lyndon B. Johnson as the Democratic Vice President nominee. He also read the Segregationists' Minority Report in opposition to a proposed civil rights platform.

When asked to participate in a televised debate with Martin Luther King regarding sit-in demonstrations, James Gray refused asserting that King had "openly defied Georgia laws." He further opposed the Albany Movement led by King by purchasing a public swimming pool in order to prevent its use by African Americans.

Gray became a Democratic candidate for governor in Georgia in 1966. He came in fourth place in the five-person Democratic primary race behind former governor Ellis Arnall, state senator Jimmy Carter, and fellow segregationist and the eventual winner Lester Maddox. Gray finished ahead of former Lieutenant Governor Garland T. Byrd. Governor Maddox nominated Gray to another term as state Democratic party chairman.

Gray ran for and was elected Mayor of Albany, Georgia in 1973. During his tenure, improvements to every aspect of city services were realized. Shopping complexes and large industries came to town as Albany became the centerpiece of South Georgia and adopted the nickname "The Good Life City". With the opening of the Albany Mall in 1976, long-established firms closed their downtown stores. Gray led an effort to revitalize the downtown area by constructing the 10,240-seat Albany Civic Center, the second largest arena in the state at the time, and by razing an entire city block in the heart of downtown with plans to rebuild it.

== Death ==
Gray died of a heart attack on September 19, 1986, at the New England Medical Center in Boston, Massachusetts.

== See also ==
- List of mayors of Albany, Georgia
