= The Desert Rose Band =

American country rock band (1985–1994)

- Pictured from left to right Herb Pedersen, Chris Hillman and John Jorgenson

Background information
- Origin: Los Angeles, California, U.S.
- Genres: Country rock; progressive country
- Years active: 1985–1994
- Labels: MCA, Curb
- Spinoff of: the Byrds
- Past members: Chris Hillman; Herb Pedersen; John Jorgenson; JayDee Maness; Steve Duncan; Tom Brumley; Jeff Ross; Tim Grogan; Bill Bryson

The Desert Rose Band was an American country rock band from Los Angeles, California, founded in 1985 by Chris Hillman (formerly of the Byrds and the Flying Burrito Brothers), with Herb Pedersen and John Jorgenson. The original lineup included Bill Bryson on bass guitar, JayDee Maness on pedal steel guitar, and Steve Duncan on drums. In the late 1980s and early 1990s, the band charted several hit singles on the US Billboard Hot Country Singles & Tracks charts until disbanding in February 1994.

== Formation ==
The Desert Rose Band was formed in 1985 by frontman Chris Hillman (born December 4, 1944), formerly a member of The Byrds, and co-founder along with the late Gram Parsons of the Country Rock band The Flying Burrito Brothers. Hillman was touring that year with Dan Fogelberg in support of his Newgrass album High Country Snows as well as appearing on the album. Additional members of Fogelberg's band were recruited by Hillman as members including Herb Pedersen (born April 27, 1944), responsible for the vocal arrangements (Herb also appeared on the High Country Snows album); John Jorgenson (born July 6, 1956), who was mainly responsible for the instrumental arrangements of the songs, and bassist Bill Bryson (1946-2017). Pedal steel player JayDee Maness (born January 4, 1945) and drummer Steve Duncan (born July 28, 1953) rounded out the group. Jorgenson and Pedersen sang three-part harmony with Hillman. Each Desert Rose Band album featured Pedersen on one lead vocal.

== Career ==
=== 1987-1989: The Desert Rose Band and Running ===
Their eponymous debut album was issued in 1987 on MCA/Curb. It contained their first hit "Ashes of Love", which was originally a Johnnie & Jack song from the early 1950s. It was the second time Hillman and Pedersen recorded "Ashes of Love," the first being on Hillman's just prior album Desert Rose on the Sugar Hill label. The Desert Rose Band's debut also featured a remake of Chris Hillman's "Time Between" which he previously wrote and recorded as a member of the Byrds, as well as the band's first chart-topper "He's Back and I'm Blue".

Their second album Running (1988) featured the John Hiatt-penned hit "She Don't Love Nobody", "Running", and a remake of Buck Owens's "Hello Trouble". The Desert Rose Band also reached #2 on the Billboard Hot Country Singles & Tracks in November of 1988 with the first single released from the Running album, "Summer Wind."

=== 1990-1993: Pages of Life, True Love and Life Goes On ===
The third album Pages of Life (1990) featured a remake of "Desert Rose" as well as a remake of Pedersen's folk song about his daughter "Our Baby's Gone" which was originally recorded on his 1976 album Southwest. JayDee Maness left the band in 1990 and was replaced on pedal steel guitar by Tom Brumley whom Jay Dee replaced in the Buckaroos. Maness would again play with Chris Hillman and Herb Pedersen on their post Desert Rose Band duo albums Bakersfield Bound and Way Out West.

The fourth studio album, True Love, was released in 1991. It was followed by 1993's Life Goes On, released only in Europe. Several prominent country and bluegrass musicians made guest appearances on Life Goes On including Sam Bush on fiddle, Tony Rice and Larry Park (of Boy Howdy) on guitar, and Al Perkins on dobro. Before the release of this final studio album, was the 1993 compilation Traditional.

John Jorgenson and Steve Duncan left the band in 1991. Jorgenson went on to form the Hellecasters with Will Ray and Jerry Donahue; Duncan also joined the Hellecasters. John Jorgenson is currently playing gypsy jazz with his John Jorgenson Quintette. Chris and Herb recorded an acoustic album called The Other Side in 2005. They continue to tour as an acoustic duo. Former Buck Owens steel guitarist Tom Brumley played with Joey Riley's band in Branson, Missouri. He died on February 3, 2009.

== Awards ==
The Desert Rose Band was nominated for two Grammy Awards, in the category Best Country Performance by a Duo or Group with Vocal: the debut album The Desert Rose Band (1987), and the single "She Don't Love Nobody" (1989).

The band was a three-time winner of the Band of the Year/Touring Award presented by the Academy of Country Music Association, in 1988, 1989, and 1990.

The band earned the Country Music Association's "Horizon Award" in 1989, and was nominated Vocal Group of the Year in 1989 and 1990.

Broadcast Music Inc., recognized "One Step Forward" and "Love Reunited" for having achieved the benchmark of One Million Broadcast Radio Performances.

== Band members ==
Final lineup

- Chris Hillman – lead vocals, guitars (1985–1994)
- Herb Pedersen – guitars, vocals (1985–1994)
- Tom Brumley – pedal steel guitar (1990–1994; died 2009)
- Tim Grogan – drums, percussion (1991–1994)
- Jeff Ross – guitars, vocals (1991–1994)

Former members

- Bill Bryson – bass guitar, vocals (1985–1991; died 2017)
- Steve Duncan – drums, percussion (1985–1991; died 2025)
- John Jorgenson – guitars, vocals (1985–1991)
- JayDee Maness – pedal steel guitar (1985–1990)

== Discography ==
=== Studio albums ===
Title	Album details	Peak positions	
Title	Album details	US Country	US
The Desert Rose Band	Release date: June 2, 1987; Label: MCA/Curb Records	24	—
Running	Release date: September 6, 1988; Label: MCA/Curb Records	26	—
Pages of Life	Release date: January 16, 1990; Label: MCA/Curb Records	17	187
True Love	Release date: October 1, 1991; Label: Curb Records	—	—
Life Goes On	Release date: September 21, 1993; Label: Curb Records	—	—
"—" denotes releases that did not chart

=== Compilation albums ===
Title	Album details	Peak positions
Title	Album details	US Country
A Dozen Roses – Greatest Hits	Release date: January 4, 1991; Label: MCA/Curb Records	44
"—" denotes releases that did not chart

=== Singles ===
Year	Single	Peak positions		Album
Year	Single	US Country	CAN Country	Album
1987	"Ashes of Love"	26	37	The Desert Rose Band
1987	"Love Reunited"	6	5	The Desert Rose Band
1987	"One Step Forward"	2	2	The Desert Rose Band
1988	"He's Back and I'm Blue"	1	1	The Desert Rose Band
1988	"Summer Wind"	2	2	Running
1988	"I Still Believe in You"	1	1	Running
1989	"She Don't Love Nobody"	3	4	Running
1989	"Hello Trouble"	11	11	Running
1989	"Start All Over Again"	6	3	Pages of Life
1990	"In Another Lifetime"	13	18	Pages of Life
1990	"Story of Love"	10	6	Pages of Life
1991	"Will This Be the Day"	37	44	A Dozen Roses – Greatest Hits
1991	"Come a Little Closer"	65	67	A Dozen Roses – Greatest Hits
1991	"You Can Go Home"	53	64	True Love
1991	"Twilight Is Gone"	67	82	True Love
1993	"What About Love"	71	—	Life Goes On
1993	"Night After Night"	—	—	Life Goes On
"—" denotes releases that did not chart

=== Music videos ===
Year	Video	Director
1988	"He's Back and I'm Blue"	
1988	"Summer Wind"	
1989	"She Don't Love Nobody"	Bill Pope
1990	"In Another Lifetime"	Bill Pope
1991	"Will This Be the Day"	Gerry Wenner
1991	"You Can Go Home"	Gustavo Garzón
1993	"What About Love"	Michael Merriman
