= Gray Media =

American television broadcast company

Gray Media, Inc.
- Formerly: Gray Communications Systems, Inc. (1960–2002); Gray Television, Inc. (2002–2025)
- Type: Public
- Traded as: NYSE: GTN; NYSE: GTN.A; Russell 2000 Component (GTN)
- Industry: Broadcast television
- Predecessor: The Herald Publishing Company
- Founded: 1946; 80 years ago
- Founder: James Gray
- Headquarters: Atlanta, Georgia, U.S.
- Area served: United States; 113 markets in 39 states; Reach: 36%
- Key people: Hilton H Howell Jr.; (executive chairman, CEO); Pat LaPlatney; (president, co-CEO)
- Products: 180 terrestrial TV stations
- Revenue: ▼$3.28 billion USD (2023)
- Operating income: ▼$383 million USD (2023)
- Net income: ▼$128 million USD (2023)
- Total assets: ▼US$10.64 billion USD (2023)
- Total equity: ▼US$2.62 billion USD (2023)
- Number of employees: 8,018 (2019)
- Website: graymedia.com

Gray Media, Inc. is an American publicly traded television broadcasting company based in Atlanta. Founded in 1946 by James Harrison Gray as Gray Communications Systems, the company is the third-largest television station operator in the United States by number of stations, owning or operating 180 stations across the United States in 113 markets. Its station base consists of media markets ranging from as large as Atlanta to one of the smallest markets, North Platte, Nebraska.

In terms of quantity and numerical total, Gray Media is the largest group owner and operator of NBC-affiliated stations (with a total of 64 affiliates), ahead of Nexstar Media Group and Tegna Inc., and the second-largest group owner and operator of ABC affiliates, behind Sinclair Broadcast Group.

== History ==
James H. Gray started his communication business in Albany, Georgia with the purchase of The Herald Publishing Company (a company founded in 1897 to promote The Albany Herald, a newspaper that started publication in 1891), in 1946 after he returned from World War II. The purchase included WALB radio. Gray launched WALB-TV in 1954. In 1960, Gray purchased WJHG-TV in Panama City, Florida, and followed it later in the decade with KTVE serving Monroe, Louisiana and southern Arkansas.

In 1986, Gray died, leaving his 50.5% share of the stock in a trust for his children with stipulation that they run the business together, sell their stock with each other or sell out together. It caused difficulties as two of the three wanted to sell, but the third was against the purchase. In 1991, to break the stalemate, the board of directors had the company purchase 25% of their shares.

=== Gray Communication Systems ===
The company was then taken public on NASDAQ's small-cap market in the 2nd quarter 1992. The price per share dropped to $8. The company put itself, or any part, up for sale by the end of 1992. While the board of directors received about 40 offers, Bull Run Corporation eventually stepped in and purchased the remaining shares of the Gray siblings, who as part of the deal resigned from the board.

New management took over all three TV stations. Bull Run Corporation, primarily owned by J. Mack Robinson, decided to make Gray a Southeast regional media company, expanding its focus beyond the state of Georgia. Gray purchased two TV stations (WKYT-TV and WYMT-TV) from the failed and government-seized Kentucky Central Insurance Company in September 1994 after a court challenge to the sale by Kentucky Central builder Garvice Kincaid.

In 1994 and 1995, Gray purchased two newspapers, the Rockdale Citizen (acquired May 31, 1994) and Gwinnett Post-Tribune (acquired January 1995; quickly renamed Gwinnett Daily Post) and seven advertising weeklies. In 1995, the company moved its stock listing to the New York Stock Exchange. By this time, Robinson, directly or through Bull Run, owned 44% of the company's stock. Gray had started to focus on its TV station segment over the newspaper holding while TV produced more income and the newspapers' income were declining. Just months after doubling the Daily Post's staff, one third were laid off and a quarter of The Albany Herald's staff followed in January 1996. Newspaper leaders resigned during this period, from the corporate president in late 1995 to the Citizen's editor and publisher.

Revenue and income (loss), by year (in millions of US dollars)
Fiscal year	Revenue	Net income (loss)	Ref
1994	$36.5	$2.8	
1995	58.6	.9	
1996	79.3	2.5	
1997	103.5	(1.4)	
1998	128.8	41.6	
1999	143.9	(6.3)	
2000	120.6	(6.2)	
2001	106.4	(13.3)	
2002	146.7	(27.8)	
2003	243.0	14.0	
2004	293.2	44.2	
2005	261.5	3.3	
2006	332.1	11.7	
2007	307.2	(23.1)	
2008	327.1	(202.0)	
2009	270.3	(23.0)	
2010	346.0	23.1	
2011	307.1	9.0	
2012	404.8	28.1	
2013	346.2	18.2	
2014	508.1	48.0	
2015	597.3	39.3	
2016	812.4	62.2	
2017	882.7	261.9	
2018	1,084.1	210.8	

In 1996, Gray added additional TV stations while entering additional communication industry segments. In 1996, Fortune considered the company the nation's 81st fastest growing company, with a 48% growth rate, and as if to prove the point, Gray purchased WRDW-TV in January 1996. In September of the same year, a basket purchase from First American Media, Inc. earned the company two more TV stations, (WCTV and WVLT-TV), Satellite and Production Business Services, which was renamed Lynqx Communications and PortaPhone paging business.

In August and September 1996, Gray raised additional operating funds by various means. On August 20, KTVE was sold for cash and accounts receivable. The company issued and sold Class B common stock (through a public offering), senior subordinated notes and preferred stock in September. Also, a new bank credit facility was arranged. This brought the company total to $534.5 million in available funds with $409.5 million directly available.

Also in September 1996, Ralph Gabbard, the newly named president and CEO, died from a heart attack at age 50. Robinson, Bull Run's chair, took over as interim CEO and president with Bull Run CEO Robert Prather as interim executive vice-president, acquisitions.

With its additional funds, Gray continued purchasing in 1997 with two announcements in January and February. The company bought Gulflink Communications, Inc., a transportable satellite uplink business based in Baton Rouge, Louisiana, in April 1997 to go along with Lynqx. With Raycom Media acquiring a station from AFLAC Broadcast Group, Inc., forcing them to sell WITN-TV to Gray, which was finalized on August 1, 1997. The Gwinnett Daily Post increased circulation in 1997 through a deal with Genesis Cable Communications to provide the paper to its metro Atlanta subscribers at Genesis's expense.

In 1998, Gray started to expand beyond its Southeast region. As the company agreed to purchase the Busse Broadcasting Corporation, which owned KOLN, KGIN-TV and WEAU. Gray's ownership of a newspaper and TV station in Albany, Georgia, while grandfathered was examined under the media cross-ownership rule of the FCC due to this potential purchase. WALB was thus sold to Liberty Corp.'s Cosmos Broadcasting in August 1998.

In 2002, Robinson became chairman and CEO, his son-in-law Hilton Howell vice chairman, Prather president/COO and Jim Ryan senior vice president. They had Gray purchase 14 Benedek Broadcasting stations while that company was in bankruptcy.

=== Gray Television ===
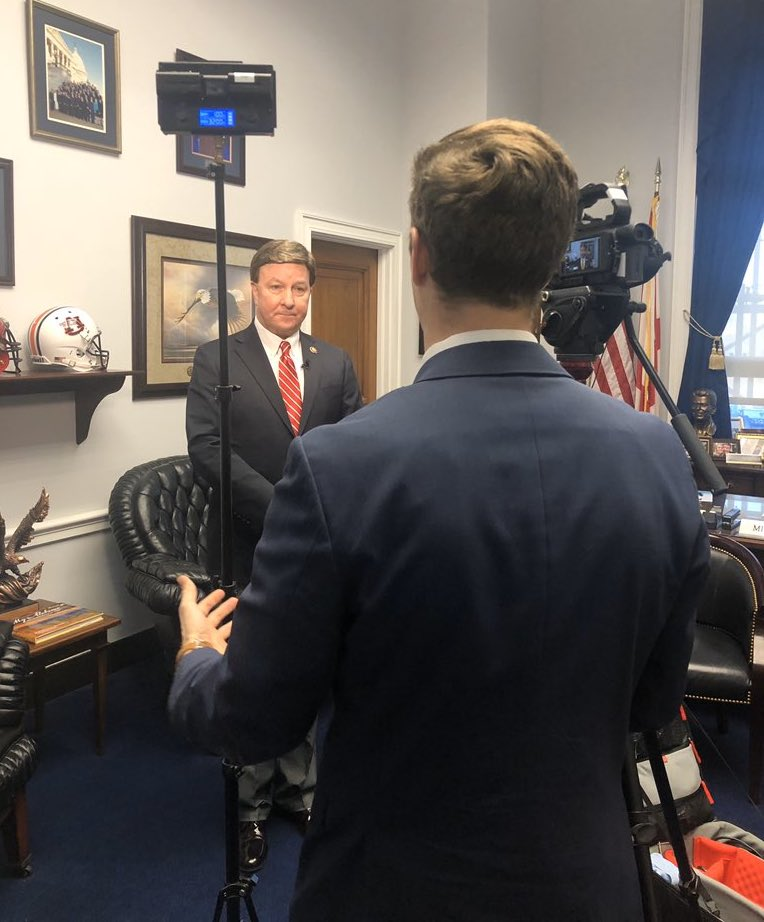
Congressmember Mike Rogers being interviewed by Gray Television's Peter Zampa in 2020

In 2006, the company spun off its five daily newspapers and wireless messaging business into the newly formed Triple Crown Media, later (in 2010) renamed Southern Community Newspapers. A new strategy of purchasing stations in college towns or capitals was put into place.

The company had overpaid for a pair of stations and was over leveraged like many other station groups entering the Great Recession. Advertising revenues dropped. The twin problems caused its shares to trade at its lowest at 16 cents in 2008, thus the NYSE indicated they might delist the company. Loan covenants could have forced the company into default. Robinson stepped down with Howell replacing him in 2008.

On July 30, 2009, Gray was awarded a contract to manage seven Young Broadcasting-owned stations. Through December 31, 2012, Gray would earn $2.2 million and an opportunity to earn additional specified incentive fees if certain performance targets were exceeded.

Prather left the company in 2013 and Howell took over the president title. On November 4, 2013, Gray announced that it would purchase Yellowstone Holdings for $23 million, adding local stations: KGNS-TV, KGWN, KCWY and KCHY-LP. Three weeks later, on November 20, Gray announced it would purchase Hoak Media and Parker Broadcasting for $335 million, and North Dakota's Fox affiliate KNDX/KXND for $7.5 million. As part of the deal, stations KAQY, KHAS-TV and KXJB, were proposed to be sold to Excalibur Broadcasting and operated by Gray under a "local marketing agreements". On December 19, it was announced that stations KREX-TV and WMBB would be sold to Nexstar Broadcasting Group, while KFQX would be sold to Mission Broadcasting. On March 25, 2014, Prime Cities Broadcasting, owner of KNDX/KXND, requested that the FCC dismiss the sale of KNDX/KXND to Excalibur.

The sale was completed on June 13, 2014. However, some stations were forced to go off the air and their programming was moved to a multicast stream on adjacent channels, due to some stations being unable to receive regulatory approval, after the FCC's ruling on joint sales agreements. Those silent stations would then be sold off to minority interest, pending FCC approval.

On July 24, 2014, SJL Broadcasting announced that it would sell WJRT-TV and WTVG to Gray, for $128 million. The sale was completed on September 15.

In July 2015, Gray closed its accounting and human resources offices in Albany (housed in the same building as The Albany Herald), combining them with the corporate offices in Atlanta.

In September 2015, Gray announced that it would acquire the television and radio stations of Schurz Communications for $442.5 million. It also purchased KCRG-TV in Cedar Rapids, Iowa, from the locally owned Gazette Company, who owned the station from its sign-on in 1953.

In January 2016, Gray opened a national news bureau in Washington, D.C., led by former APTV journalist Jacqueline Policastro. The bureau was designed to provide enhanced coverage of national political issues for Gray's local stations.

On May 13, 2016, Gray announced that it would acquire WDTV and WVFX in Clarksburg, West Virginia, from Withers Broadcasting for $26.5 million. On June 3, 2016, it was announced that Gray would acquire two stations that were spun-off from the Nexstar-Media General merger; KWQC-TV in Davenport, Iowa, and WBAY-TV in Green Bay, Wisconsin, for $270 million. On February 16, 2017, Gray announced that it would acquire WABI-TV in Bangor, Maine, and WCJB-TV in Gainesville, Florida, from Diversified Communications for $85 million. On May 4, 2017, Gray announced its intent to acquire WCAX-TV in Burlington, Vermont, from Mount Mansfield Television for $29 million.

In April 2017, Gray filed a lawsuit against Nick Prueher and Joe Pickett, founders of the Found Footage Festival, for fraud and copyright infringement, after having booked an appearance on the morning show of a Gray station as a fake strongman act, "Chop and Steele", and utilizing the footage during their show. The parties later agreed to a settlement.

On May 21, 2018, Gray entered into an agreement to acquire KNHL from Legacy Broadcasting for $475,000. Gray intended to turn KNHL into a satellite of its NBC affiliate KSNB-TV.

On June 25, 2018, Gray announced its intent to acquire Raycom Media for $3.65 billion, pending regulatory approval. The combined company would be led by Raycom's current president and CEO Pat LaPlatney, with current Gray CEO Hilton Howell acting as executive chairman and co-CEO. The acquisition, which Gray expected to close in late 2018, would give Gray 142 stations in 92 markets, making Gray the third-largest owner of television stations in the United States, with a total market share of 24%.

Although Gray foresaw that the acquisition would receive regulatory approval quickly, due to limited market overlap between the two companies and its still-relatively low total market reach post-acquisition. Gray would divest nine stations in markets where Gray and Raycom both already owned stations, including WTNZ, WTOL, KXXV, WTXL, WFXG, KWES-TV, WPGX, WSWG and WDFX-TV. The sale was approved by the FCC on December 20, 2018. The deal was completed on January 2, 2019.

Gray announced on April 24, 2019, a joint venture with Grand Ole Opry Entertainment Group, a subsidiary of Ryman Hospitality Properties, a former owner of The Nashville Network. The services would consist of a broadcast diginet and an OTT streaming platform. The joint venture is based in Nashville under general manager Drew Riefenberger. Gray contributed distribution and marketing capabilities, multicast knowledge and affiliate Gray TV stations. The Circle TV network made its launch on January 1, 2020.

On February 1, 2021, Gray announced its intent to acquire all Quincy Media's broadcasting properties for $925 million in cash. To comply with federal regulators, Gray would divest Quincy stations in Tucson; Harrisburg, Illinois; Waterloo/Cedar Rapids, Iowa; and Madison, La Crosse and Wausau in Wisconsin over to Allen Media Group. Gray's acquisition of Quincy Media was completed on August 2.

In March 2021, Gray revealed plans to purchase the former General Motors Doraville, Georgia Assembly plant site, and transform the site into a media production community, appropriately called Assembly. The "studio city" was planned to include multiple film studios, as well as apartments, townhomes, a hotel, corporate offices, restaurants and retail space. In September 2021, Gray Television purchased Doraville-based Third Rail Studios for $27.5 million.

On May 3, 2021, Gray announced plans to buy the television division of Meredith Corporation for $2.7 billion. If approved, Gray would sell WJRT-TV to acquire competing station WNEM-TV, owned by Meredith. It was revealed that Allen Media Group would purchase WJRT-TV in Flint for $70 million. The sale was completed on December 1.

On September 18, 2021, Gray launched InvestigateTV, a weekly program featuring investigative stories from a national team and Gray local investigations to a national audience. The program draws from an investigative unit formed at WVUE under Raycom ownership.

In January 2022, Gray acquired 24 low-powered station from Lowcountry 34 Media for over $3.75 million.

In March 2022, Gray acquired 4 former Box stations from L4 Media Group: KBXS-CD in Shreveport, Louisiana, WBXA-CD in Birmingham, Alabama, WBXC-CD in Champaign, Illinois, and WBXM-CD in Montgomery, Alabama, reuniting them with WBXH-CD in Baton Rouge, Louisiana.

In May 2022, Gray reached an agreement with the Telemundo Network Group expanding the term of Gray's affiliation agreements with Telemundo. This new agreement allows Gray the right to launch the first local Telemundo affiliations on their television stations in 22 additional markets.

On September 28, 2022, Gray announced its intent to purchase WBQC-LD for $2.5 million. The sale was completed on November 21, making WBQC-LD a sister station to WXIX-TV.

On September 11, 2023, InvestigateTV+, a weekday expansion of the InvestigateTV franchise, launched on all Gray television stations and is syndicated to stations outside of a Gray market.

On October 1, 2023, the Peachtree Sports Network launched in Georgia, focusing on live, local sports programming all year long. The broadcast network launched in Atlanta but was planned to air on Gray-owned over-the-air channels in Albany, Augusta, Columbus, Macon and Savannah in the following months.

On November 7, 2023, Gray, Warner Bros. Discovery and Lionsgate teamed up to form Free TV Networks, a new company to be led by broadcasting veteran Jonathan Katz, with presence in both broadcast networks and FAST streaming channels. The company launched broadcast and FAST streaming versions of The365, a channel for African-American audiences, and Outlaw, a network for Western programming, as well as FAST channels VCR Action and VCR Haha, under the joint venture on January 1, 2024. Later, on November 10, 2023, it was announced that Circle would cease its broadcast operations on December 31, 2023, with plans on transitioning to FAST streaming and other avenues, as well as a likely chance for the broadcast operations of Circle to be replaced by one of two channels of the new Free TV Networks company.

On February 1, 2024, it was announced that Marquee and Gray had reached agreements to swap television stations in Wyoming and Utah. As part of the swap Marquee ended up with KCWY-DT in Casper, Wyoming; KGWN-TV in Cheyenne, Wyoming; KSTF in Scottsbluff, Nebraska; and KNEP in Sydney, Nebraska. At the same time Gray got Marquee's FCC permit authorizing construction of a new and currently unbuilt TV station KCBU in Salt Lake City.

On February 14, 2024, Gray Television and Syncbak launched Zeam, a free ad-supported steaming service that features local news, sports and weather.

=== Gray Media ===
On December 30, 2024, the Board of Directors at Gray Television formally approved changing the name of the company to "Gray Media," after years of referring to the company internally and externally by that informal name.

On January 14, 2025, Gray announced its acquisition of KXLT-TV from SagamoreHill Broadcasting. Gray had already operated the station under a SSA. The FCC approved the purchase on March 11 under a failing station waiver. The sale was completed on March 21.

On July 7, 2025, Gray and The E.W. Scripps Company announced they were engaging in a station swap. Gray will get WSYM-TV and KATC whereas Scripps will get KKTV, KKCO, KJCT-LP, KMVT, and KSVT-LD. The FCC approved the multi-market exchange on April 28, 2026, and was completed on May 15.

On July 31, 2025, Gray announced that it would acquire WLTZ and KJTV-TV from SagamoreHill. Gray also managed these stations through a shared services agreement. Gray is hoping to obtain failing station waivers from the FCC and is aiming to have the deal done by the fourth quarter of 2025. The sale was approved by the FCC on May 6, 2026, including authority for Gray to own three TV station licenses in the Lubbock market, and completed two days later.

On August 1, 2025, Gray announced its acquisition of the stations owned by Block Communications for $80 million. Once again, Gray is hoping the deal is done by the fourth quarter of 2025. The sale was completed on May 6, 2026.

On August 8, 2025, Gray announced its intent to acquire stations in 10 markets from Allen Media Group for $171 million. WLFI-TV in Lafayette, Indiana; WTHI-TV in Terre Haute, Indiana; and WTVA in Columbus–Tupelo, Mississippi are in new markets for Gray. In the other seven markets, there will be duopolies with existing Gray-owned stations: WAAY-TV in Huntsville, Alabama (alongside Gray's WAFF); WCOV-TV in Montgomery, Alabama (alongside Gray's WSFA); WSIL-TV/KPOB-TV in Harrisburg, Illinois/Poplar Bluff, Missouri (alongside Gray's KFVS-TV in Cape Girardeau, Missouri); WREX in Rockford, Illinois (alongside Gray's WIFR-LD); WEVV-TV/WEEV-LD in Evansville, Indiana (alongside Gray's WFIE); WFFT-TV in Fort Wayne, Indiana (alongside Gray's WPTA and WISE-TV, forming a triopoly); and KADN-TV/KLAF-LD in Lafayette, Louisiana (alongside Gray's pending ownership of KATC). Gray expects the deal to be completed by the fourth quarter of 2025. On March 23, 2026, the FCC approved the transfer of WLFI-TV, WTHI-TV, and WTVA from Allen. The sale of WTHI, WLFI, & WTVA was completed on March 27, 2026, while the sale in the other seven markets was completed on May 1, 2026.

On March 10, 2026, Gray Media and Dish Network failed to negotiate a carriage agreement, forcing Gray Media stations off the satellite TV provider in 113 markets.

== Staff ==
Under the direction of executive chairman and CEO Hilton Howell, Gray Television was one of the first broadcasters to implement a COVID-19 vaccination mandate. He has said he is "proud" of the corporate culture he has helped create. Howell says he supports media consolidation and opposes an FCC cap on ownership. In their 2022 environmental, social, and governance (ESG) report, Howell noted he was committed to "improving our gender and racial diversity in leadership, our business ethics and compliance policies, our training and development, and our responsible energy use". According to the report, under Howell's leadership, the company aired a six-month series on health and wellness in Appalachia, known as "Bridging the Great Health Divide", expanded their relationship with Telemundo to provide additional Spanish-language content in the United States, highlighted stories about historically black colleges and universities (HBCUs), aired and produced content about Pride Month and Hispanic Heritage Month in local markets, and aired and produced two climate change series, Troubled Water, a documentary about the water crisis, and Coast & Climate, a series about the impact of climate change in Louisiana. Howell is a donor to the Republican Party.

== Assets ==
=== Current ===
- Raycom Sports
- PowerNation Studios
  - PowerNation (automotive hobby programming for syndication across many of Gray's affiliates, RSNs, and FAST streaming)
  - Circle Country (FAST streaming channel; joint venture with Opry Entertainment Group)
- Tupelo Honey (production company)
- Zeam (FAST streaming channel; joint venture with the National Association of Broadcasters and streaming technology company Syncbak; a service comprising about 300 local TV stations from Gray, CBS, Hearst and others that emphasizes local news coverage, which launched February 14, 2024)

Gray Television has an investment in broadcasting company Sarkes Tarzian, Inc.

== Management of Young Broadcasting stations ==
On July 22, 2009, a New York bankruptcy judge approved a plan transferring ownership of Young Broadcasting and its stations to the company's secured lenders. The plan included Gray Television coming in as an outside party to advise on the operations of Young-owned stations in seven markets through December 2012. The new Young Broadcasting still held the final say on overall operations for their stations, including programming and personnel.

The former Young-owned stations managed by Gray Television include:

- WKRN-TV in Nashville, Tennessee
- WTEN in Albany, New York; repeater WCDC-TV in Adams, Massachusetts; and an SSA with WXXA-TV
- WRIC-TV in Richmond, Virginia
- WBAY-TV in Green Bay, Wisconsin
- KWQC-TV in Davenport, Iowa
- KELO-TV in Sioux Falls, South Dakota and its translators throughout South Dakota
- KLFY-TV in Lafayette, Louisiana

Young Broadcasting would retain ownership of all its stations, including three stations that Gray would not operate: KRON-TV in San Francisco, California, WATE-TV in Knoxville, Tennessee, and WLNS-TV in Lansing, Michigan, the last two due to Gray already owning stations in those markets. Gray considered the possibility of purchasing the Young stations if the group went on the market.

The agreement ended without any further extensions on December 31, 2012, and Young agreed to a merger with Media General in mid-2013. Gray would eventually purchase KWQC and WBAY outright when Nexstar Broadcasting Group acquired Media General in 2017, as Nexstar already owned WHBF-TV and WFRV-TV in each market. At that time, Gray had already acquired Sioux Falls rival station KSFY. Gray would also re-enter the Richmond market when it bought WWBT in 2019, following its merger with Raycom Media, and would also re-enter the Nashville market in 2021 with WSMV-TV after acquiring the television assets of Meredith Corporation.

== Washington News Bureau ==
By January 20, 2016, Gray had set up their Washington news bureau by Jacqueline Policastro to enable stations to get interviews with U.S. Senators and Representatives serving their communities. The bureau cooperates with Lilly Broadcasting's Washington bureau, previously started by Policastro, and is located at the NBC News Capitol Hill bureau, 400 N. Capitol Street. In February 2019, Gray announced that journalist Greta Van Susteren joined the company as its Chief National Political Analyst. Gray then announced in April 2019 Greta Van Susteren as host of a Sunday morning syndicated show, Full Court Press with Greta Van Susteren, which was launched in September 2019. Van Susteren departed the company for Newsmax TV in late 2022.

=== Local News Live ===
Originating from Gray's Washington bureau is Local News Live, a hosted service of live breaking news and events from the 113 Gray television markets across the country, similar to LiveNow from Fox (produced by Fox Television Stations) and The National Desk (produced by Sinclair Broadcast Group). The channel operates from 7 a.m. to midnight Eastern (with paid programming vacating their spots), features live newscasts at 7 a.m., 2 p.m., and 8 p.m. Eastern time, and repeats throughout the day when no breaking news is occurring. In addition to live events, the anchors interview reporters and use footage not otherwise seen on broadcast. Local News Live airs on Gray television live streams between local newscasts and as a separate option on Gray station websites. The network is also available through some cable providers, including Spectrum, though under a slightly different name, as Local Look Today, as of August 2025.

== Sports programming ==
Since 2023, Gray has created several over-the-air regional sports networks; including Arizona's Family Sports, Gulf Coast Sports & Entertainment Network, Matrix Midwest, Palmetto Sports & Entertainment, Peachtree Sports Network, Rock Entertainment Sports Network (a joint venture with Rock Entertainment Group), Tennessee Valley Sports Entertainment Network and Silver State Sports & Entertainment Network.

Nationally, Gray holds the rights to the American Association of Professional Baseball, the National Collegiate Hockey Conference, and Fight Sports.
