= Rosenberg Brothers Department Store =

- U.S. National Register of Historic Places
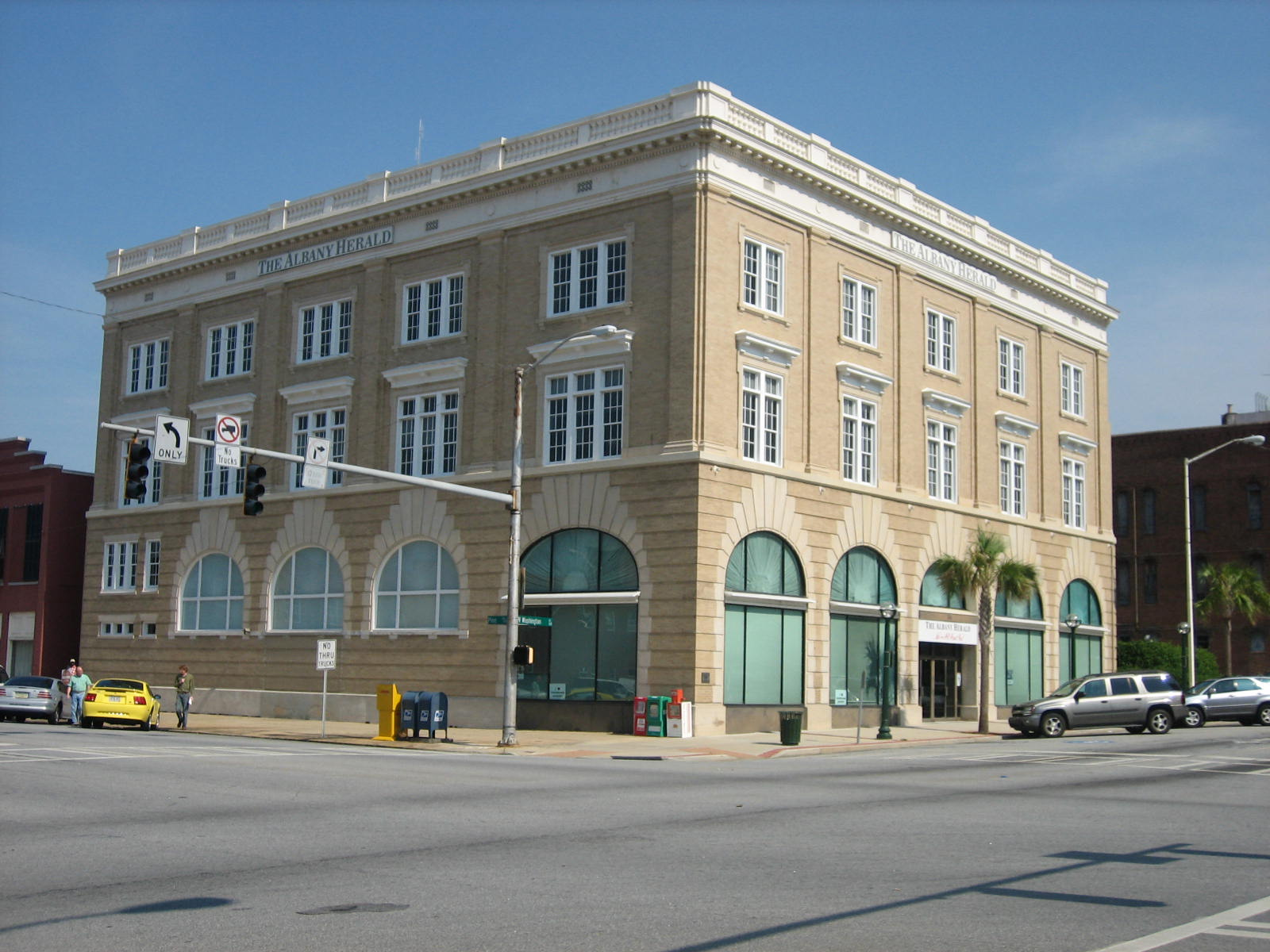
- View from the intersection of Pine Avenue & Washington Street
- Location: Albany, Georgia, USA
- Coordinates: 31°34′42″N 84°09′04″W
- Built: 1924
- Architect: J. C. Hind and J. T. Murphy
- Architectural style: Second Renaissance Revival
- NRHP reference No.: 82002406
- Added to NRHP: August 19, 1982

The Rosenberg Brothers Department Store building is located in downtown Albany, Georgia, USA. The three-story brick structure was built in 1924 in an Italianate/Neo-Renaissance Classical Revival style by J.C. Hind and J. T. Murphy.

Jacob Rosenberg was a Jewish merchant who leased a store at this prominent corner lot in 1896. The site was owned by the Tift family, who founded Albany. Rosenberg had a new department store building constructed on the site in 1923 in a Second Renaissance Revival architecture style. When Martin Luther King campaigned in Albany, Joseph Rosenberg fought hard to keep his store and town segregated. It continued in business until 1978 when a second Rosenberg's location opened within the, then new, Albany Mall in 1976. Gray Communications bought and renovated the building in 1985 for $850,000 (~$2.1 million in 2024) to house the Albany Herald.

The building, and several nearby buildings, were sold to the city of Albany for $850,000. The Herald, which occupied the building for more than three decades, moved out in December 2019.
