= Bill McAfee =

American baseball player and politician (1907–1958)

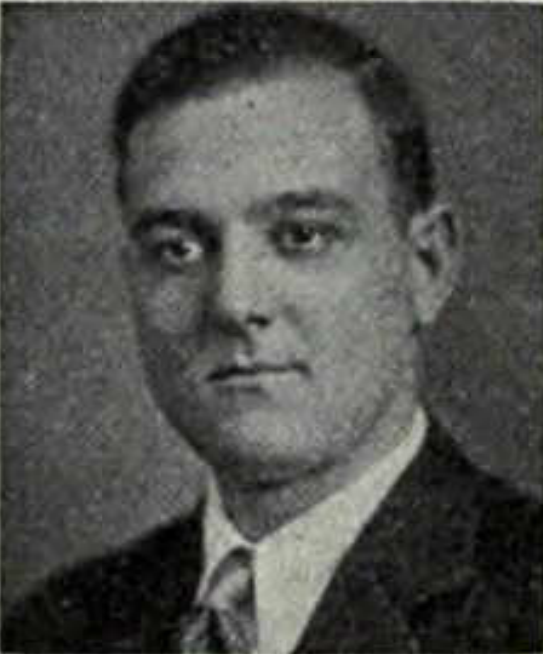
- McAfee from the 1930 Michiganensian
- Pitcher
- Born: September 7, 1907; Smithville, Georgia, US
- Died: July 8, 1958 (aged 50); Culpeper, Virginia, US
- Batted: Right Threw: Right

MLB debut
- May 12, 1930, for the Chicago Cubs

Last MLB appearance
- September 22, 1934, for the St. Louis Browns

MLB statistics
- Win–loss record: 10-4
- Earned run average: 5.69
- Strikeouts: 44
- Stats at Baseball Reference

Teams
- Chicago Cubs (1930); Boston Braves (1931); Washington Senators (1932–1933); St. Louis Browns (1934)

William Fort McAfee, Jr. (September 7, 1907 – July 8, 1958) was an American baseball pitcher and politician.

He played Major League Baseball from 1930 to 1934 for the Chicago Cubs, Boston Braves, Washington Senators, and St. Louis Browns. He appeared in 83 major league games, all but seven as a relief pitcher, and compiled a record of 10-4 with an ERA of 5.69. He had his best season in 1932 when he was the starting pitcher in five games and compiled a 6-1 record and 3.92 ERA for the Senators.

McAfee had played college baseball for the University of Michigan from 1927 to 1929 and participated in the Michigan Wolverines baseball team's 13-game tour of Japan in the fall of 1929. He also played minor league baseball in the International League for the Reading Keystones, Newark Bears, Montreal Royals, and Rochester Red Wings.

A native of Georgia, McAfee later returned to his home state. He was elected and served as the mayor of Albany, Georgia. He died in a plane crash near Culpeper, Virginia in 1958.

== Early years ==
McAfee was born in Smithville, Georgia in 1907. At the time of the 1910 United States census, he was living in Smithville with his father William Fort McAfee, Sr. and two older sisters, Hilda and Mary. His father was a Georgia native and a widower. By 1920, the family had moved to Charlotte, North Carolina. The family consisted of McAfee's father, his second wife Lucy, stepmother to McAfee and his two older sisters; and a younger half-brother (age two). His father was employed as manager for International Harvester Company. McAfee played baseball and other sports in high school.

== University of Michigan ==
McAfee enrolled at the University of Michigan and played baseball for the Michigan Wolverines baseball team in 1928 and 1929. In September 1929, he traveled to Japan with the Michigan baseball team for a month at the invitation of Meiji University. This was part of a series of interactions between the universities since after World War I. The team played against the Meiji and other university baseball teams during its month's stay, winning 11 of 13 games on its tour of the country. The team returned from Japan in October 1929 aboard the SS Shinyō Maru, sailing from Ray Fisher, Ernest McCoy, Louis Kubicek, and Ray Nebelung. McAfee was also a member of Michigamua and the Theta Delta Chi fraternity while at Michigan. He graduated with a bachelor of arts degree in 1930.

== Professional baseball ==
At six feet, two inches, McAfee was considered "a giant" in the early 1930s. The tall right-handed pitcher began his Major League Baseball career with the Chicago Cubs. He made his major league debut on May 12, 1930, two weeks after graduating from the University of Michigan. McAfee pitched only one inning for the Cubs over the course of two games. In one inning of work for the Cubs, he faced 10 batters and allowed three hits, two bases on balls, one wild pitch, and five unearned runs. Despite the rocky start, he did not allow an earned run and compiled a 0-0 record and 0.00 ERA with the Cubs.

After his brief stint with the Cubs, McAfee spent most of the 1930 season with the Reading Keystones in the International League. He appeared in 21 games for the Keystones and compiled a 7-8 record with a 6.22 ERA.

In October 1930, the Cubs traded McAfee to the Boston Braves in exchange for Bobby Smith. In April 1930, The Sporting News reported on the expectations for McAfee: "McAfee did not show much promise in the conditioning search at St. Pete, but before the team left he was going along on high, [Bill] McKechnie spoke glowingly of his fast ball, curve, control and his pitching sagacity. It's almost too much to expect McAfee to fill Bobby Smith's shoes, but McKechnie will be a bit disappointed if McAfee does not step in as a regular starter." McAfee appeared in 18 games for the Braves during the 1931 season, all but one as a relief pitcher. He compiled a 0-1 records with a 6.37 ERA.

McAfee spent most of the 1932 season as the property of the Boston Braves, but playing under option with the Montreal Royals in the International League. He appeared in 23 games for the Royals, compiling an 8-9 record with a 4.70 ERA.

McAfee joined the Washington Senators in August 1932. A trade had been announced to send McAfee and two other players to the Baltimore Orioles for Baxter Jordan, but Senators' owner Clark Griffith noted that McAfee had been optioned three times and claimed McAfee by the waiver route. In two months with the team, he compiled a 6-1 record with a 3.92 earned run average (ERA) in eight game (five as starter).

During the 1933 season, Washington Senators manager Joe Cronin used McAfee to replace Firpo Marberry "as chief of the relief pitching brigade." However, McAfee's ERA soared to 6.62, the highest of his major league career, in 61-2/3 innings with the Senators in 1933. Even so, he compiled a 3-2 record in 1933. In June 1933, McAfee punched a spectator in Cleveland after being pulled from a game; McAfee had been "razzed" throughout the game by the "leather-lunged rooter."

At the beginning of August 1933, McAfee was sent to the Rochester Red Wings in a deal for Ed Chapman. He appeared in 17 games for the Red Wings, compiling a 1-4 record with a 5.37 ERA.

At the end of the 1933 season, the Red Wings sent McAfee to the Columbus Red Birds in the American Association. On February 15, 1934, the St. Louis Browns acquired him from Columbus. During the 1934 season, McAfee appeared in 28 games for the Browns, all as a relief pitcher. He compiled a 1-0 record with a 5.84 ERA. This season was also notable in that McAfee set a current mark for the lowest single-season strikeout rate among qualified major-league relievers ever, at 3.8%.

In February 1935, McAfee announced that he was retiring from baseball to pursue a business career in Chicago with his father.

== Later years and family ==
After retiring from baseball, McAfee returned to his home state and lived in Albany, Georgia. He was the co-owner of a truck and tractor company, a distributor for International Harvester, and was active in promoting Little League and PONY League baseball in Albany. He was also elected as the mayor of Albany in 1956 and again in 1958. He held the position at the time of his death. McAfee was active in securing funding to construct the Southwest Georgia Regional Airport terminal which was posthumously named in his honor in 1959.

McAfee was married to Lillian Foote McAfee. They had a son, William Fort McAfee III (1937–2011), and a daughter, Linda (McAfee) Halford. In July 1958, McAfee died in a plane crash near Culpeper, Virginia. He was traveling with friends, including the president of the Citizens' and Southern Bank of Albany, in a twin-engined plane to the 1958 Major League Baseball All-Star Game in Baltimore. He was buried at Crown Hill Cemetery in Albany.

== See also ==
- List of mayors of Albany, Georgia
