= John Jorgenson Quintet =

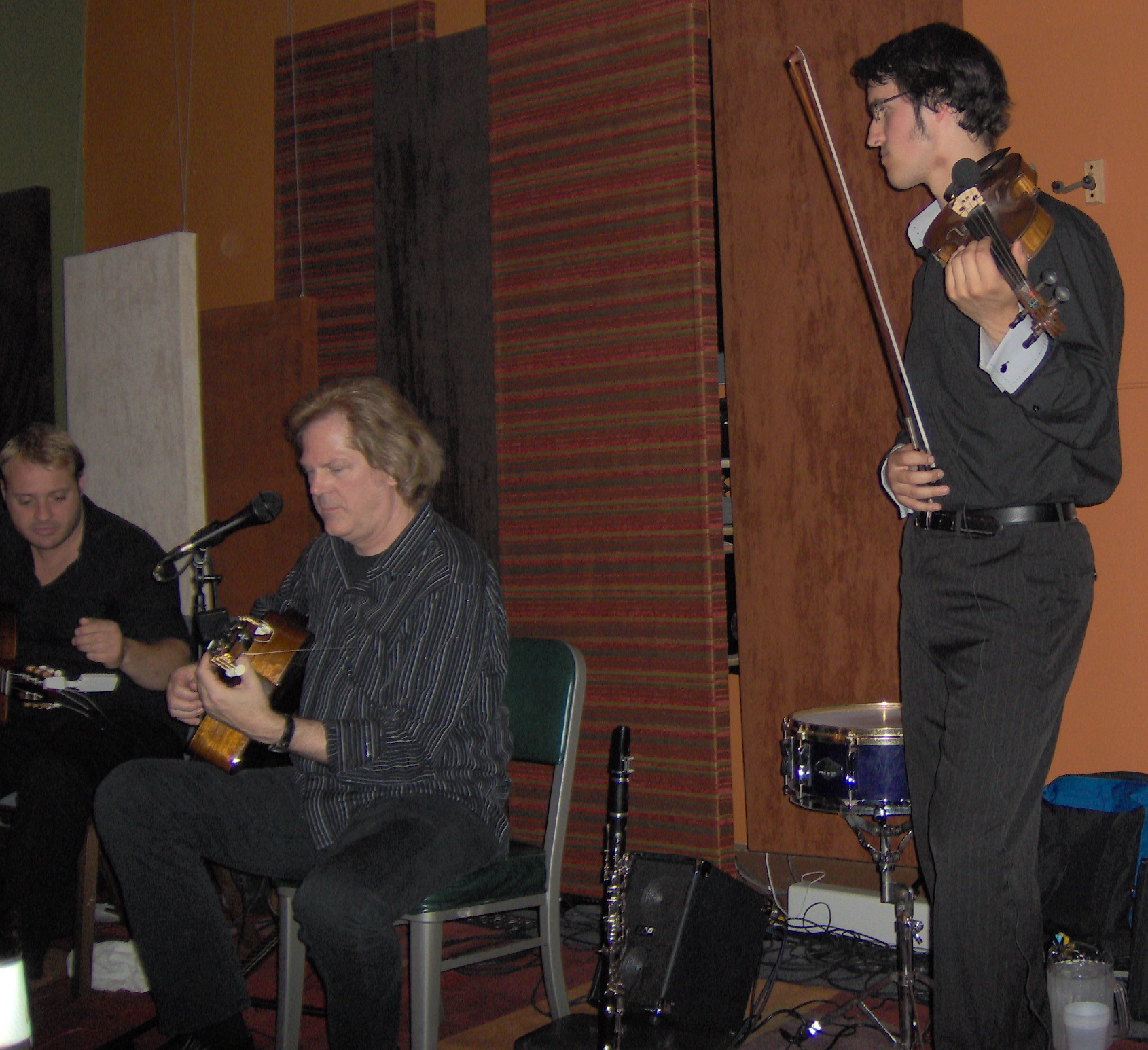
- John Jorgenson Quintet at Kentucky Coffee Tree Cafe in Frankfort, Kentucky; left to right: Kevin Nolan, rhythm guitar; John Jorgenson, guitar; Jason Anick, violin

Background information
- Genres: Gypsy jazz
- Years active: 2004–present
- Labels: Curb, Pharaoh
- Members: John Jorgenson; Jason Anick; Doug Martin; Simon Planting; Rick Reed
- Past members: Kevin Nolan; Gonzalo Bergara; Stephen Dudash; Cesare Valbusa; Charlie Chadwick
- Website: johnjorgenson.com

The John Jorgenson Quintet is an American gypsy jazz band led by guitarist John Jorgenson, a pioneer of the American gypsy jazz movement. The band was formed in 2004 for the release of Franco-American Swing.

Members include jazz violinist Jason Anick, rhythm guitarist Doug Martin, bassist Simon Planting, and percussionist Rick Reed.

== Gypsy jazz ==
The quintet performs gypsy jazz, a style of music made famous by French guitarist Django Reinhardt. The quintet recreated the music of Reinhardt for the films Gattaca and Head in the Clouds. In Head in the Clouds, John Jorgenson portrayed Reinhardt.

== Members ==
John Jorgenson, a Grammy Award winning guitarist, is the band's lead instrumentalist. Jorgenson plays the guitar and clarinet.

Doug Martin was born in California. A San Francisco native, Martin has been playing guitar since age 12. He studied with guitarist Allen J. Brown, pianist Charles "Gus" Gustavson, jazz guitarist Warren Nunes, and classical guitarist Charles Ferguson before he joined the John Jorgenson Quintet in 2009.

Jason Anick is a graduate of University of Hartford and the Hartt School where he studied acoustical engineering and jazz violin.

Simon Planting studied jazz and improvised music at the Sweelinck Conservatory in Amsterdam. In 2009, Planting jointed the John Jorgenson Quintet and is re-united with Kevin Nolan.

Rick Reed, from Tuscaloosa, Alabama, plays percussion with the band.

Former members include Kevin Nolan, Gonzalo Bergara, Stephen Dudash, Cesare Valbusa, and Charlie Chadwick. Guitarist Bergara plays both blues and gypsy jazz. Dudash plays guitar, bass, congas and mandolin in addition to the five-string viola. Valbusa plays drums, and Chadwick plays double bass.

== Discography ==
- After You've Gone (Curb, 1988)
- Franco-American Swing (Pharaoh, 2004)
- Ultraspontane (Pharaoh/J2, 2007)
- One Stolen Night (Pharaoh/J2, 2010
- Istiqbal Gathering (Pharaoh/J2, 2010)
