= Hello Trouble (song) =

Single by The Desert Rose Band

from the album Running
- B-side: "Homeless"
- Released: July 1989
- Genre: Country, country rock, bluegrass
- Length: 2:03
- Label: MCA/Curb
- Songwriters: Orville Couch, Eddie McDuff
- Producers: Paul Worley, Ed Seay

The Desert Rose Band singles chronology
"She Don't Love Nobody" (1989)	"Hello Trouble" (1989)	"Start All Over Again" (1989)

"Hello Trouble" is a song written by Orville Couch and Eddie McDuff and was recorded by Couch in 1962. Couch's version made number 5 on the country charts that year, via Vee-Jay Records.

Buck Owens and the Buckaroos also covered the song on the album Together Again, released in 1964. This version was later included on the soundtrack to Crazy Heart in 2009.

LaWanda Lindsey covered the song in 1974 for Capitol Records. Her version charted at number 62.

It was then recorded by American country music group The Desert Rose Band and released in July 1989 as the fourth and final single from the album, Running. The song reached #11 on both the Billboard Hot Country Singles & Tracks chart and the Canadian RPM Country Tracks chart. The Desert Rose Band version features Herb Pedersen on lead vocals.

== Chart performance ==
=== Orville Couch ===
Chart (1962–1963)	Peak position
US Hot Country Songs (Billboard)	5

=== LaWanda Lindsey ===
Chart (1974)	Peak position
US Hot Country Songs (Billboard)	62

=== The Desert Rose Band ===
Chart (1989)	Peak position
Canada Country Singles (RPM)	11
US Hot Country Songs (Billboard)	11
