= Love Reunited =

Single by The Desert Rose Band

from the album The Desert Rose Band
- B-side: "Hard Times"
- Released: July 11, 1987
- Genre: Country, country rock, country pop
- Length: 2:58
- Label: MCA/Curb
- Songwriter(s): Chris Hillman, Steve Hill
- Producer(s): Paul Worley

The Desert Rose Band singles chronology
"Ashes of Love" (1987)	"Love Reunited" (1987)	"One Step Forward" (1987)

"Love Reunited" is a song written by Chris Hillman and Steve Hill, and recorded by American country music group The Desert Rose Band. It was released in July 1987 as the second single from the album The Desert Rose Band. The song reached number 6 on the Billboard Hot Country Singles & Tracks chart.

== Chart performance ==
Chart (1987)	Peak position
US Hot Country Songs (Billboard)	6
Canadian RPM Country Tracks	5
