= List of mayors of Albany, Georgia =

Mayors of the city of Albany, Georgia, USA

The following is a list of mayors of the city of Albany, Georgia, USA.

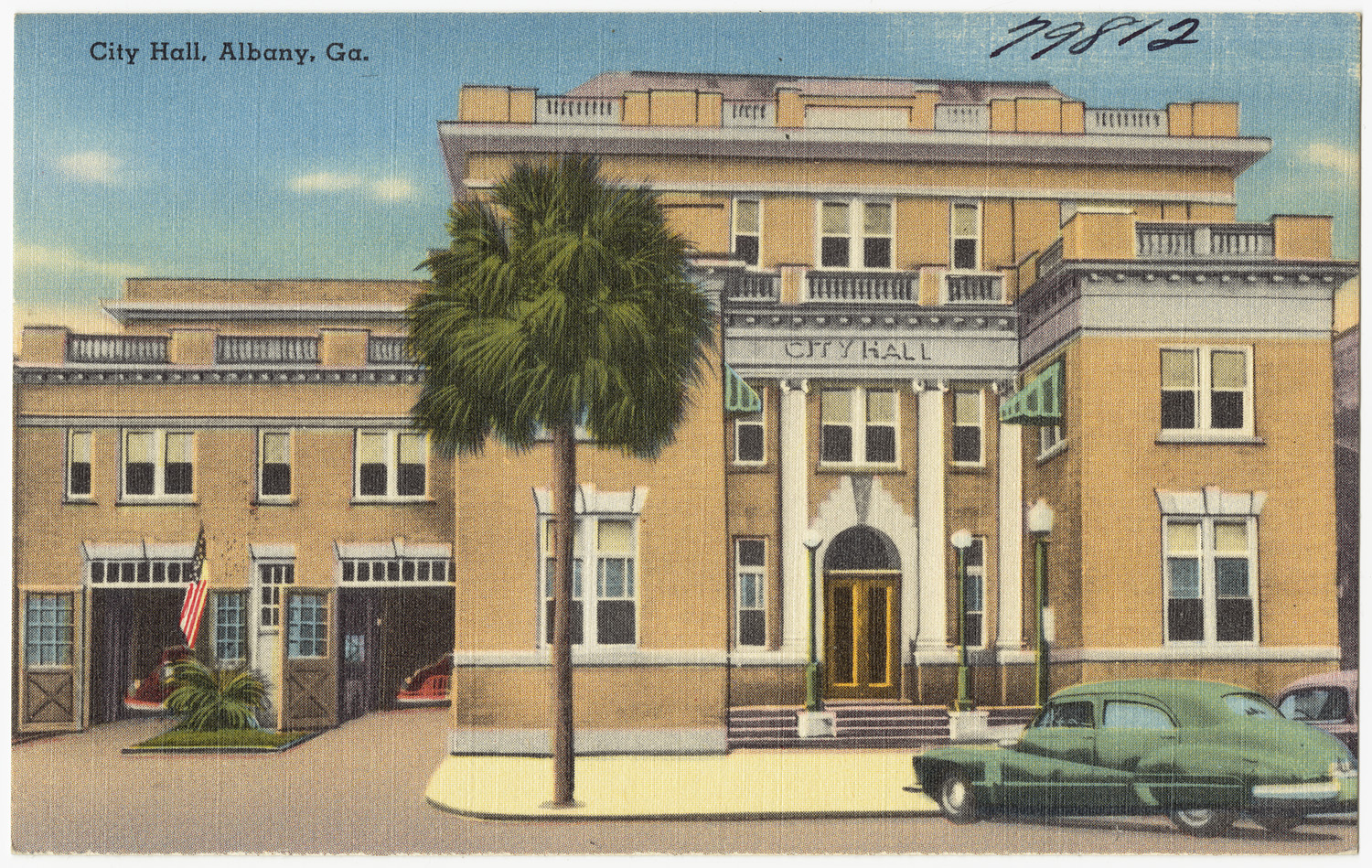
Albany City Hall building in Georgia, USA, mid–20th century

- Davis Pace, 1857
- Richard F. Lyon, 1858–1859
- James M. Mercer, 1860
- F. K. Wright, 1861–1862
- E. T. Jones, 1863–1864
- Samuel D. Irvin, 1864
- Shadrick Atkinson, 1865
- G. J. Wright, 1866–1869
- James M. Mercer, 1870, 1873, 1875
- Leonard E. Welch, 1871
- Allatia C. Westbrook, 1872
- Richard Hobbs, 1874
- William H. Wilder, 1876–1879, 1881–1882, 1884, 1886
- Ed L. Wight, 1880, 1895–1896
- A. P. Greer, 1883
- W. H. Gilbert, 1885, 1891–1894
- T. N. Woolfolk, 1887–1888, 1890, 1898
- H. M. McIntosh, 1889
- S. B. Brown, 1900–1901
- J. S. Davis, 1902–1903
- A. J. Lippitt, 1904–1905
- C. W. Rawson, 1906–1907
- Henry A. Tarver, 1908–1909, 1912–1915
- Nelson F. Tift, 1910–1911
- M. W. Tift, 1916–1919
- H. A. Peacock, 1920–1923
- W. M. Legg, 1924–1925
- Edmund H. Kalmon, 1925–1927
- W. Banks Haley, 1928–1929, 1940–1947
- John S. Billingslea, 1930–1932
- E. A. Fry, ca.1933–1934
- W. J. Collins, ca.1934, 1938–1939
- R. F. Armstrong, 1935–1937
- J. W. Smith, 1948–1949, 1954–1955
- M. B. Peacock, 1950–1951
- E. E. Wetherbee Jr., 1952–1953
- Bill McAfee, 1956–1958
- Jim Porter Watkins, 1959
- Asa D. Kelley Jr., 1960–1963
- James V. Davis, 1964–1968
- Fred W. Mills, 1968–1970
- Eugene R. Clark Jr., 1972–1972
- Motie Wiggins, 1972–1973
- James H. Gray Sr., 1974–1986
- Wm. Larry Bays, 1986–1990
- Tommy Coleman, 1990–1992
- Paul Keenan, 1992–1996
- Tommy Coleman, 1996–2004
- Willie Adams Jr., 2004–2012
- Dorothy Hubbard, 2012–2020, first African American woman elected mayor
- Bo Dorough, 2020–present

== See also ==
- Albany history
