= One Step Forward =

Single by The Desert Rose Band

from the album The Desert Rose Band
- B-side: "Glass Hearts"
- Released: October 26, 1987
- Genre: Country, country rock
- Length: 3:22
- Label: MCA/Curb
- Songwriter(s): Chris Hillman, Bill Wildes
- Producer(s): Paul Worley

The Desert Rose Band singles chronology
"Love Reunited" (1987)	"One Step Forward" (1987)	"He's Back and I'm Blue" (1988)

"One Step Forward" is a song written by Chris Hillman and Bill Wildes, and recorded by American country music group The Desert Rose Band. It was released in October 1987, as the third single from the album The Desert Rose Band. The song reached #2 on the Billboard Hot Country Singles & Tracks chart, behind "Tennessee Flat Top Box" by Rosanne Cash.

The song is featured in the 2004 video game Grand Theft Auto: San Andreas.

== Charts ==
=== Weekly charts ===
Chart (1987–1988)	Peak position
US Hot Country Songs (Billboard)	2
Canadian RPM Country Tracks	2

=== Year-end charts ===
Chart (1988)	Position
Canadian RPM Country Tracks	41
US Hot Country Songs (Billboard)	67
