= I Still Believe in You (The Desert Rose Band song) =

Single by The Desert Rose Band

from the album Running
- B-side: "Livin' in the House"
- Released: October 1988
- Genre: Country, country rock
- Length: 4:12
- Label: MCA/Curb
- Songwriters: Chris Hillman; Steve Hill
- Producers: Ed Seay; Paul Worley

The Desert Rose Band singles chronology
"Summer Wind" (1988)	"I Still Believe in You" (1988)	"She Don't Love Nobody" (1989)

'I Still Believe in You' is a song written by Chris Hillman and Steve Hill, and recorded by American country music group The Desert Rose Band. It was released in October 1988 as the second single from the album Running. The song was the second and final number one on the country chart for The Desert Rose Band. The single went to number one for one week and spent fifteen weeks on the country chart.

== Chart performance ==
Chart (1988–1989)	Peak position
US Hot Country Songs (Billboard)	1
Canadian RPM Country Tracks	1

=== Year-end charts ===
Chart (1989)	Position
Canada Country Tracks (RPM)	28
US Country Songs (Billboard)	27
