= She Don't Love Nobody =

Single by The Desert Rose Band

from the album Running
- B-side: "Step on Out"
- Released: March 1989
- Genre: Country, country rock, rock and roll
- Length: 2:58
- Label: MCA/Curb
- Songwriter: John Hiatt
- Producers: Paul Worley, Ed Seay

The Desert Rose Band singles chronology
| "I Still Believe in You" (1988) | "She Don't Love Nobody" (1989) | "Hello Trouble" (1989) |

"She Don't Love Nobody" is a song written by John Hiatt, and first recorded by Nick Lowe and His Cowboy Outfit on the 1985 album The Rose of England. In 1989, American country music group The Desert Rose Band released their version as the third single from the album Running. It reached number 3 on the Billboard Hot Country Singles & Tracks chart.

An alternate version of the song appeared as track 1 on a DRB 5-track CD sampler in 1988 (Curb CD 33-3004).

== Music video ==
The Desert Rose Band released a music video of the song in early 1989, which was directed by Bill Pope and produced by Joanne Gardner for Acme Pictures.

== Critical reception ==
Upon release, Billboard wrote: "John Hiatt's tale of a hard-to-get love gets a solid ride from the Desert Rose Band. An up-tempo and energetic rendering." Cash Box considered the song "a winner of a tune". They added: "An instantly likeable song, it characterizes a girl who keeps herself out of reach from love's letdowns. Desert Rose's harmonies allow for chiming in all around."

== Chart performance ==
| Chart (1989) | Peak position |
|---|---|
| Canada Country Singles (RPM) | 4 |
| US Hot Country Songs (Billboard) | 3 |

=== Year-end charts ===
| Chart (1989) | Position |
|---|---|
| Canada Country Tracks (RPM) | 87 |
| US Country Songs (Billboard) | 45 |
