= Summer Wind (The Desert Rose Band song) =

Single by The Desert Rose Band

from the album Running
- B-side: "Our Songs"
- Released: July 30, 1988
- Genre: Country, country rock
- Length: 3:26
- Label: MCA/Curb
- Songwriter(s): Chris Hillman, Steve Hill
- Producer(s): Paul Worley, Ed Seay

The Desert Rose Band singles chronology
"He's Back and I'm Blue" (1988)	"Summer Wind" (1988)	"I Still Believe in You" (1988)

'Summer Wind' is a song written by Chris Hillman and Steve Hill, recorded by the American country music group The Desert Rose Band. It was released in July 1988 as the first single from their album Running. The song reached number 2 on the Billboard Hot Country Singles & Tracks chart, just behind "Darlene" by T. Graham Brown.

== Charts ==
=== Weekly charts ===
Chart (1988)	Peak position
US Hot Country Songs (Billboard)	2
Canadian RPM Country Tracks	2

=== Year-end charts ===
Chart (1988)	Position
Canadian RPM Country Tracks	44
US Hot Country Songs (Billboard)	37
