= He's Back and I'm Blue =

Single by The Desert Rose Band

from the album The Desert Rose Band
- B-side: "One That Got Away"
- Released: February 1988
- Genre: Country, country rock
- Length: 3:05
- Label: MCA/Curb
- Songwriter(s): Robert Anderson; Michael Woody
- Producer(s): Paul Worley

The Desert Rose Band singles chronology
"One Step Forward" (1987)	"He's Back and I'm Blue" (1988)	"Summer Wind" (1988)

"He's Back and I'm Blue" is a song written by Robert Anderson and Michael Woody, and recorded by the American country music group The Desert Rose Band. It was released in February 1988 as the third single from the album The Desert Rose Band. The song was the fourth country hit for The Desert Rose Band and the first of two number ones for the group. The single went to number one for one week and spent a total of fourteen weeks on the country chart.

== Charts ==
=== Weekly charts ===
Chart (1988)	Peak position
US Hot Country Songs (Billboard)	1
Canadian RPM Country Tracks	1

=== Year-end charts ===
Chart (1988)	Position
Canadian RPM Country Tracks	14
US Hot Country Songs (Billboard)	22
