= The Rockdale Citizen =

- Type: Daily newspaper
- Owner(s): Southern Community Newspapers Inc.
- Founder(s): W. Thomas Hay
- Founded: July 30, 1953
- Headquarters: 920 Green Street, SW, Suite A1; Conyers, Georgia 30012; United States
- Website: The Rockdale Citizen

The Rockdale Citizen is a newspaper serving the community of Conyers, Georgia and Rockdale County, Georgia, USA. The Citizen publishes two days a week, Wednesday and Sunday, serves as the legal organ for Rockdale County, and is available online. It is a member of the Georgia Press Association.

== History ==
The Rockdale Citizen was founded by W. Thomas Hay as a weekly newspaper, and was first published on July 30, 1953.

The Citizen became a semi-weekly newspaper (Tuesday and Thursday) in 1972 and began publishing as a daily evening newspaper (Monday through Friday) in 1977. In 1994, it was acquired by Gray Communications.

In July 1996 a deal was made with the Atlanta Committee for the Olympic Games for the Citizen to be distributed on the shuttles to and from the equestrian events at the Georgia International Horse Park. In order to handle this, the Citizen had to switch to morning delivery and add a Saturday edition to provide results for Friday events and schedules for Saturday's events.

The Citizen launched a sister newspaper, The Newton Citizen, located in Covington, GA, in February 2000, and added a Sunday edition.

In 2005, Gray spun off its newspapers as Triple Crown Media. The company was renamed Southern Community Newspapers in 2010.
