= The Albany Herald =

Newspaper published in Albany, Georgia

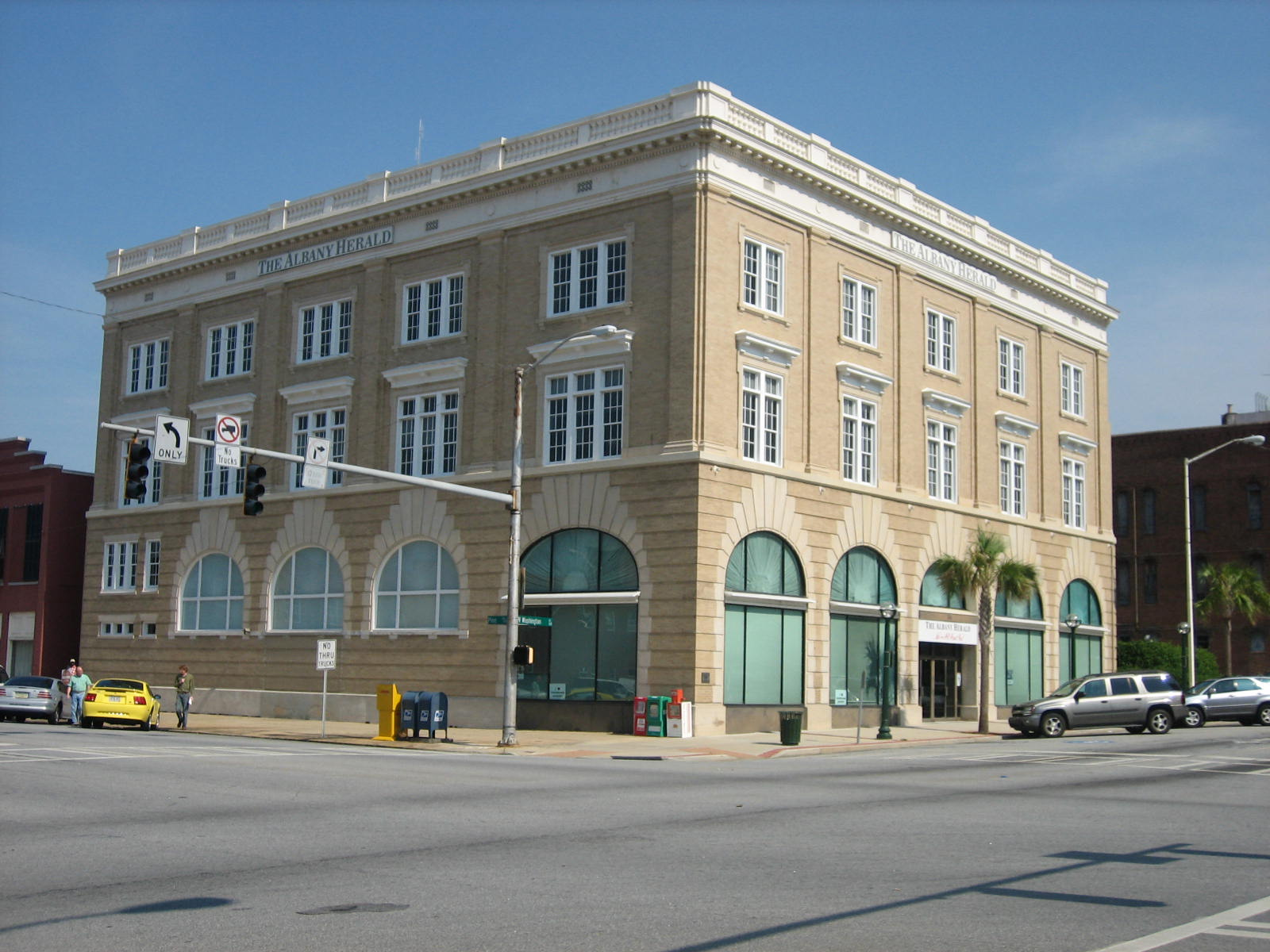
- The entrance to the former offices of the Albany Herald as seen from the intersection of Pine Avenue and Washington Street in downtown Albany
- Type: Daily newspaper
- Format: Broadsheet
- Owner: Georgia Trust for Local News
- Editor: Carlton Fletcher
- Founded: 1891; 135 years ago
- Headquarters: 306 W Broad Ave.; Albany, Georgia
- Country: United States
- Circulation: 14,717 (as of 2013)
- Sister newspapers: Clayton News Daily; Gwinnett Daily Post; Henry Daily Herald; Jackson Progress-Argus; Newton Citizen; Rockdale Citizen
- OCLC number: 12531100
- Website: Official website

The Albany Herald is the daily newspaper for metro Albany in the U.S. state of Georgia. It is distributed in metro Albany and in southwest Georgia. The newspaper was founded in 1891. Offices for the paper were previously housed in the historic Rosenberg Brothers Department Store in downtown Albany.

== History ==
The Herald Publishing Company was founded in 1891 by H.M. McIntosh as a Democratic daily. It added a weekly Saturday edition in 1892 and a Sunday edition in 1893. After a few years, the success of the Albany Daily Herald drove the other Albany daily newspaper, the Albany News and Advertiser, out of business.

The paper was purchased by James H. Gray in 1946 after he returned from World War II. The Albany Herald would become the flagship newspaper of Gray Communications Systems (now Gray Media).

In 1993, The Herald converted to a morning publication.

In 2005 Gray's newspaper holdings were spun off into a separate company which was named Triple Crown Media. Triple Crown Media changed its name to Southern Community Newspapers Incorporated in 2010.

The Herald announced in October 2012 that it would cease its printing operation in Albany and cut 26 jobs. The paper was printed by Gannett Company at the Tallahassee Democrat.

In May 2017, The Herald switched to a paid subscription website. Full access to The Herald's website is free with the paid subscription to the print newspaper.

The Herald introduced a new weekend edition in October 2017 which is delivered Sunday mornings. The new edition combines the Saturday and Sunday papers, and include more pages, new features and additional color comics.

In March 2018, Scot Morrissey was named the new publisher of The Herald. Morrissey was previously the publisher of the Athens Banner-Herald for nearly 10 years.

After more than three decades in the historic Rosenberg Brothers Department Store building, the paper moved to a smaller office on West Broad Avenue in December 2019. The building, and several adjacent buildings, were sold to the city of Albany for $850,000 in April 2019.

In 2023, The Albany Herald was acquired by the Georgia Trust for Local News, an independent, nonprofit newspaper company in Georgia.
