= What About Love (The Desert Rose Band song) =

Single by The Desert Rose Band

from the album Life Goes On
- Released: 26 July 1993
- Genre: Country, country rock
- Length: 3:18
- Label: Curb
- Songwriters: Chris Hillman; Steve Hill
- Producers: Paul Worley; Ed Seay

The Desert Rose Band singles chronology
| "Twilight Is Gone" (1991) | "What About Love" (1993) | "Night after Night" (1993) |

"What About Love" is a song by American country rock band The Desert Rose Band, which was released in 1993 as the lead single from their fifth and final studio album Life Goes On. The song was written by Chris Hillman and Steve Hill, and produced by Paul Worley and Ed Seay. "What About Love" peaked at No. 71 on the US Billboard Hot Country Singles & Tracks chart.

== Release ==
"What About Love" was released by Curb Records as a promotional CD single in the United States only. Prior to the single's release on 26 July 1993, a "mystery teaser" campaign was launched by Curb with the intention of generating interest for the track on country radio. The label sent the single to all reporting radio stations across the United States, but withheld all identification of the band. The single was instead presented in a black box with the gold-embossed text, "The Magic and Mystery of Music". Programmers were asked to identify the artist, write their answers on a contest entry form and send the form to an anonymous P.O. box for the chance of winning a trip to the Bahamas. The competition received entries from over 200 stations, which in turn created early interest in the single.

In the Gavin Report of July 30, 1993, "What About Love" was listed as the third most added song on country radio, with 69 adds. It received a further 17 adds the following week and another six the week after. In the Gavin Report of August 20, the song was listed as having been dropped by radio. "What About Love" reached No. 71 on the US Billboard Hot Country Singles & Tracks chart in September 1993. It was both the band's lowest and final charting single. Although Life Goes On was due to be released in the US on 23 September 1993, Curb subsequently only released the album in Europe.

In an interview with The Sacramento Bee in 1993, Herb Pederson spoke of the single's lack of chart success, "'What About Love' did real well, but there was no room for it to move up. The top 10 just did not move out of the way. There was a total roadblock. We were calling radio guys all over the country. They loved the song, [but] said they had no room for it right now on their playlists. It's a shame because we are really fond of the song and think it could have been a major hit."

== Music video ==
The song's music video was directed by Michael Merriman. It was shot in a courtyard in Santa Fe, New Mexico. The video was the only one to be created for a song on the Life Goes On album, where it became the band's final music video. The video achieved medium rotation on both Country Music Television and the Nashville Network. For the week ending August 1, 1993, the video reached No. 50 on the Country Music Television chart which listed the network's most-played clips. Jim Bessman, writing for Billboard, noting the video contained "spiritual overtones emphasizing the song's theme" and added, "The clip suggests the West Coast country sound that Desert Rose has always epitomized."

== Critical reception ==
On its release, Larry Flick of Billboard wrote, "Love is an obstacle course here, but the picking and singing are smooth as silk." Lisa Smith of the Gavin Report commented, "The Desert Rose Band are back, with a new lineup but the same great sound. Chris Hillman, who wrote this song with frequent collaborator Steve Hill, gives 'What About Love' an intriguing, darkly optimistic tone."

== Track listing ==
CD single

1. "What About Love" - 3:18

== Personnel ==
The Desert Rose Band

- Chris Hillman – lead vocals, guitar, mandolin
- Herb Pedersen – guitar, banjo, dobro, vocals
- Bill Bryson – bass, vocals
- Tom Brumley – pedal steel guitar
- Jeff Ross – guitar
- Tim Grogan – drums, percussion, vocals

Production

- Paul Worley – production
- Ed Seay – production

== Charts ==
| Chart (1993) | Peak position |
|---|---|
| US Hot Country Songs (Billboard) | 71 |
