= Start All Over Again =

Single by The Desert Rose Band

from the album Pages of Life
- B-side: "Fooled Again"
- Released: November 1989
- Genre: Country, country rock
- Length: 3:57 (edited version); 4:31 (album version)
- Label: MCA/Curb
- Songwriters: Chris Hillman, Steve Hill
- Producers: Paul Worley, Ed Seay

The Desert Rose Band singles chronology
"Hello Trouble" (1989)	"Start All Over Again" (1989)	"In Another Lifetime" (1990)

"Start All Over Again" is a song written by Chris Hillman and Steve Hill and recorded by the American country music group The Desert Rose Band. It was released in November 1989 as the first single from the album Pages of Life. The song reached number 6 on the Billboard Hot Country Singles & Tracks chart.

== Chart performance ==
Chart (1989–1990)	Peak position
Canada Country Singles (RPM)	3
US Hot Country Songs (Billboard)	6

=== Year-end charts ===
Chart (1990)	Position
Canada Country Tracks (RPM)	26
US Country Songs (Billboard)	27
