= Orville Couch =

American singer-songwriter

- Born: February 21, 1935
- Origin: Grapevine, Texas, U.S.
- Died: May 26, 2002 (aged 67)
- Genres: Country
- Occupation: Singer-songwriter
- Instruments: Vocals, guitar
- Years active: 1960s
- Label: Vee-Jay

Orville Couch (February 21, 1935 – May 26, 2002) was an American country music singer. He recorded one studio album for Vee Jay Records in 1963, in addition to appearing on radio shows. The album produced two singles on the Billboard country music charts: "Hello Trouble" at No. 5 and "Did I Miss You?" at No. 25. Couch died in 2002 of acute lymphoblastic leukemia.

== Discography ==
=== Singles ===
Year	Title	Chart Positions
Year	Title	US Country
1962	"Hello Trouble"	5
1963	"Did I Miss You?"	25

=== Album ===
- Hello Trouble (Vee-Jay, 1964)
