= John Jorgenson =

American musician (born 1956)

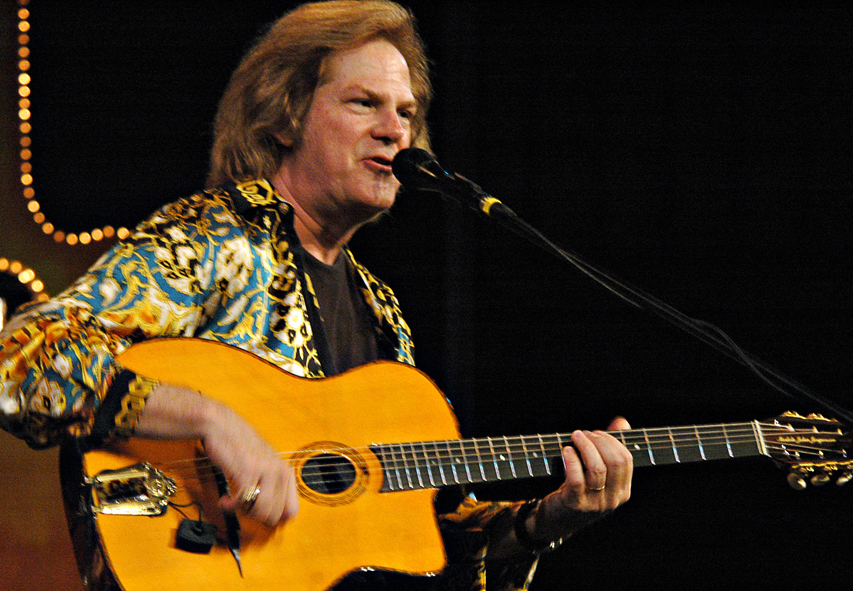
- Jorgenson playing Gypsy jazz in 2009

Background information
- Born: John Richard Jorgenson; July 6, 1956 (age 70); Madison, Wisconsin, U.S.
- Origin: Redlands, California, U.S.
- Genres: Gypsy jazz, country, rock, bluegrass
- Occupation: Musician
- Instruments: Vocals; guitar; bass guitar; saxophone; clarinet; pedal steel guitar
- Years active: 1970–present
- Labels: FGM, Purple Pyramid, a division of Cleopatra
- Website: johnjorgenson.com

John Richard Jorgenson (born July 6, 1956) is an American musician. Although best known for his guitar work with bands such as the Desert Rose Band and The Hellecasters, he is also proficient on the mandolin, mandocello, Dobro, pedal steel guitar, piano, upright bass, clarinet, bassoon, and saxophone. While a member of the Desert Rose Band, he won the Academy of Country Music's "Guitarist of the Year" award three consecutive years.

Jorgenson has recorded or toured with Elton John, Tommy Emmanuel, The Byrds, Bob Dylan, Bob Seger, Willie Nelson, Johnny Cash, Emmylou Harris, Hank Williams Jr., Barbra Streisand, Luciano Pavarotti, Roy Orbison, Patty Loveless, Michael Nesmith, John Prine, and Bonnie Raitt.

== Early years ==
He was born in 1956 in Madison, Wisconsin, into a musical family. His mother was a piano teacher and his father an orchestra conductor and college music professor. Jorgenson has played professionally since the age of fourteen, and had been playing both the piano and clarinet since age eight. When Jorgenson was one, he and his family moved to Redlands, California.

Jorgenson attended high school in Redlands, California, graduating in May 1974. He eventually attended the University of Redlands, majoring in woodwind performance. One of his early bands in this period was named Rocking Pneumonia, c. 1971.

In his early 20s he played full-time at Disneyland, playing clarinet with the Main Street Maniacs (Dixieland), mandolin with the Thunder Mountain Boys (bluegrass) and guitar with the Rhythm Brothers (Django Reinhardt style swing). These three groups were composed of the same four members, who changed costumes and music styles at intervals throughout each day.

== Later years ==
In 1993 Jorgenson formed the guitar trio the Hellecasters with Will Ray and guitarist Jerry Donahue of Fairport Convention. Intended as a temporary collaboration, the Hellecasters went on to release several albums during the 1990s. Their debut, Return of the Hellecasters (1993) won both "Album of the Year" and "Country Album of the Year" from Guitar Player magazine.

In 1994 he was invited to join Elton John's band for an 18-month tour. He remained with the band for the next six years, performing both live and in the studio, occasionally on saxophone. In 2002 he played bass guitar in the All-star Bluegrass Celebration in Nashville. Two years later he portrayed jazz guitarist Django Reinhardt in the film Head in the Clouds.

Jorgenson collaborated with Brad Paisley, James Burton, Vince Gill, Albert Lee, Brent Mason, Redd Volkaert and Steve Wariner on the song "Cluster Pluck", on Paisley's album Play (2009). The song won a Grammy Award in the Best Country Instrumental Performance category.

He is a patron for Guitar-X (Tech Music Schools) in London, where he regularly visits to hold master classes. He is also a patron for Le QuecumBar, the world's only music venue dedicated to Gypsy swing in London.

His gypsy jazz ensemble, John Jorgenson Quintet includes Doug Martin (rhythm guitar), Jason Anick (violin), Simon Planting (bass), and Rick Reed (percussion).

== Custom guitars ==
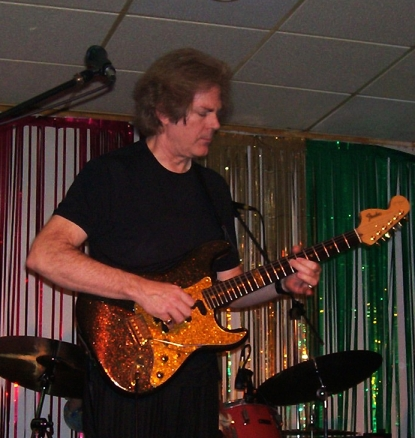
John Jorgenson performs in Liverpool (2006) with his Fender Hellecaster guitar.

G&L Guitars made a very few signature John Jorgenson ASAT guitars in Silver Sparkle with Silver Sparkle Pickguard, rosewood fretboard and Black ASAT Pickups in 1995. Fender made signature guitar models for Jorgensen in 1997 and 1998. The Fender Limited Edition John Jorgenson Hellecaster was made in Japan in 1997. It features a black sparkle-finished maple body, vintage-tinted, high-gloss maple neck with reversed large-style Strat headstock, rosewood fretboard with gold sparkle dot inlays, 22 jumbo frets and Schaller locking tuners. Refinements included three Seymour Duncan custom-voiced, split-coil, hum-cancelling pickups which allow players to get controlled feedback in distortion mode and a custom-wired, five-way pickup selector switch with an additional push/pull control allowing seven tone variations. Other touches included a custom two-pivot-point tremolo, a Wilkinson "Wilkaloid" self-lubricating nut, gold sparkle pickguard and gold hardware.

The Fender John Jorgenson Signature Custom Korina Telecaster was made at the Fender Custom Shop in 1998, sporting a solid Korina body, a maple neck with pearloid dot inlays and a 25.5" scale length, African rosewood or an ebony on black finish fretboard with 22 Dunlop 6130 frets. Other features included dual side-by-side Telecaster humbucking pickups, a modified vintage style Tele bridge, a special custom five-way pickup switching featuring five different combinations (each in humbucking mode), 1.688" width at the nut and Sperzel Trimlok locking tuners.

In 1994, he became the third artist to have a custom signature series guitar built by Takamine Guitars. The JJ325SRC and the twelve-string JJ325SRC-12, born from the EF325SRCA, feature a spruce top with bubinga back and sides in a gloss red satin finish, a rosewood fretboard on a mahogany neck with his signature J.J. inlay on the 12th fret, and gold tubes with white pearloid knobs.

The most recent John Jorgenson signature guitar is the Fret-King FKV25JJ in Arcadian and Versailles Green. Designed in conjunction with Trev Wilkinson, the guitar is packed with a whole host of features including a chambered body, three self-intonating brass saddles, a matched, calibrated set of Wilkinson WVT pickups and two auxiliary ‘ghost’ coils which provide both hum-cancelling and classic single coil tones at the turn of a dial, thanks to the unique ‘Vari-coil’ control. John's Fret-King signature model will be joined by the FKV25JCAR in Candy Apple Red in 2019. 2019 will also see both Fret-King Jorgenson models shift from chambered to solid body construction.

== Discography ==
=== As leader ===
- After You've Gone (Curb, 1988)
- Crop Circles with Davey Johnstone (Solid Air, 1999)
- Emotional Savant (J2, 1999)
- Franco-American Swing (J2, 2004)
- Ultraspontane (J2, 2007)
- Istiqbal Gathering (J2, 2010)
- One Stolen Night (J2, 2010)
- J2B2 Special Edition (J2, 2014)
- From the Crow's Nest (Cleopatra, 2017)

With The Desert Rose Band

- The Desert Rose Band (Curb, 1987)
- Running (Curb, 1988)
- Pages of Life (Curb, 1990)
- True Love (Curb, 1991)
- Life Goes On (MSI, 2007)

With The Hellecasters

- The Return of the Hellecasters (Pacific Arts Audio, 1993)
- Escape from Hollywood (Rio, 1994)
- Hell III New Axes to Grind (Pharaoh, 1997)

=== As sideman ===
With Kenny Chesney

- No Shoes, No Shirt, No Problems (BNA, 2002)
- All I Want for Christmas Is a Real Good Tan (BNA, 2003)
- When the Sun Goes Down (BNA, 2004)
- Be as You Are (Songs from an Old Blue Chair) (BNA, 2005)
- The Road and the Radio (BNA, 2005)

With Rodney Crowell

- Jewel of the South (MCA, 1995)
- The Houston Kid (Sugar Hill, 2001)
- Fate's Right Hand (DMZ, 2003)
- Christmas Everywhere (New West, 2018)
- Texas (RC1, 2019)
- Then Again (New West, 2026)

With Jerry Donahue

- Telecasting (Making Waves, 1986)
- Neck of the Wood (the Road Goes On Forever, 1992)
- Telecasting Recast (Telebender Music, 1998)

With Firefall

- Comet (Sunset, 2020)

With Neal McCoy

- 24-7-365 (Giant, 2000)

With Michael Nesmith

- Tropical Campfires (Pacific Arts Audio, 1992)

With Syd Straw

- Surprise (Virgin Records, 1989)

With others

- Chad Brock, Yes! (Warner Bros., 2000)
- Lisa Brokop, Undeniable (Cosmo, 2000)
- Brooks & Dunn, Red Dirt Road (Arista, 2003)
- Mary Chapin Carpenter, Come On Come On (Columbia, 1992)
- Steph Carse, Steph Carse (H2E, 2000)
- Carlene Carter, Little Love Letters (Giant, 1993)
- Carlene Carter, Little Acts of Treason (Giant, 1995)
- Lionel Cartwright, Chasin' the Sun (MCA, 1991)
- Beth Nielsen Chapman, Look (Sanctuary, 2004)
- John Cowan, Sixty (Compass, 2014)
- Jesse Dayton, Hey Nashvegas! (Stag, 2001)
- Levi Dexter, Pomp! (Vinyl Japan, 1992)
- Peter Frampton, Fingerprints (A&M, 2006)
- Beppe Gambetta, Dialogs (Hi Folks!, 1988)
- Amy Grant, Somewhere Down the Road (Sparrow, 2010)
- Collin Raye, Tracks (Epic, 2000)
- Janne Haavisto, Permanent Jet Lag (Texicalli, 2001)
- Emmylou Harris and Rodney Crowell, Old Yellow Moon (Nonesuch, 2013)
- Highway 101, The New Frontier (Liberty, 1993)
- Chris Hillman, Like a Hurricane (Sugar Hill, 1998)
- Chris Hillman, Bidin' My Time (Rounder, 2017)
- Juice Newton, American Girl (Renaissance, 1999)
- Steve Holy, Brand New Girlfriend (Curb, 2006)
- Elton John, The Big Picture (Mercury, 1997)
- Elton John, Peachtree Road (Rocket, 2004)
- Carolyn Dawn Johnson, Room with a View (Arista, 2001)
- Ronan Keating, Duet (Polydor, 2010)
- The Knack, Normal as the Next Guy (Smile, 2001)
- Chris LeDoux, Stampede (Capitol, 1996)
- Mike Love, Unleash the Love (BMG, 2017)
- Mark Mancina, Bad Boys (La-La Land, 2007)
- Brad Martin, Wings of a Honky-Tonk Angel (Epic, 2002)
- Roger McGuinn, Back from Rio (Arista, 1991)
- Roger McGuinn, Limited Edition (April First Productions, 2004)
- Jo Dee Messina, A Joyful Noise (Curb, 2002)
- Craig Morgan, Craig Morgan (Atlantic, 2000)
- Allison Paige, The End of the World (Lofton Creek, 2003)
- Brad Paisley, Play: The Guitar Album (Arista, 2008)
- Lee Roy Parnell, Love Without Mercy (Arista, 1992)
- Lee Roy Parnell, On the Road (Arista, 1993)
- Paul Personne, Lost in Paris Blues Band (Verycords, 2016)
- Pierce Pettis, Chase the Buffalo (High Street, 1993)
- Michael Peterson, Modern Man (AGR Television, 2004)
- John Prine, The Missing Years (Oh Boy, 1991)
- John Prine, Lost Dogs and Mixed Blessings (Oh Boy, 1995)
- Bonnie Raitt, Nick of Time (Capitol, 1989)
- Lionel Richie, Tuskegee (Mercury, 2012)
- LeAnn Rimes, Blue (Curb, 1996)
- Ashton Shepherd, Sounds So Good (MCA, 2008)
- Barbra Streisand, A Love Like Ours (Columbia, 1999)
- Bob Seger, The Fire Inside (Capitol, 1991)
- Earl Scruggs, Earl Scruggs and Friends (MCA, 2001)
- Earl Scruggs & Doc Watson & Ricky Skaggs, The Three Pickers (Rounder, 2003)
- Victoria Shaw, in Full View (Reprise, 1995)
- Sir Douglas Quintet, Day Dreaming at Midnight (Elektra, 1994)
- South 65, Dream Large (Atlantic, 2001)
- Billy Ray Cyrus, Home at Last (Walt Disney, 2007)
- JD Souther, Natural History (Entertainment One, 2011)
- Pam Tillis, Homeward Looking Angel (Arista, 1992)
- Tin Tin Out, Eleven to Fly (Virgin, 1999)
- Tin Tin Out, What I Am (VC, 1999)
- Travis Tritt, T-R-O-U-B-L-E (Warner Bros., 1992)
- Tanya Tucker, Complicated (Capitol Records, 1997)
- Sylvie Vartan, Avec Toi... (Columbia, 2018)
- Gene Watson, Back in the Fire (Warner Bros., 1989)
- Hank Williams Jr., Hog Wild (Curb, 1995)
- Hank Williams Jr., A.K.A. Wham Bam Sam (Curb, 1996)
- Chely Wright, Never Love You Enough (MCA, 2001)
- Chely Wright, Lifted Off the Ground (Vanguard, 2010)
- Trisha Yearwood, Jasper County (MCA, 2005)
- Trisha Yearwood, PrizeFighter: Hit After Hit (RCA, 2014)
