= Doug Dillard discography =

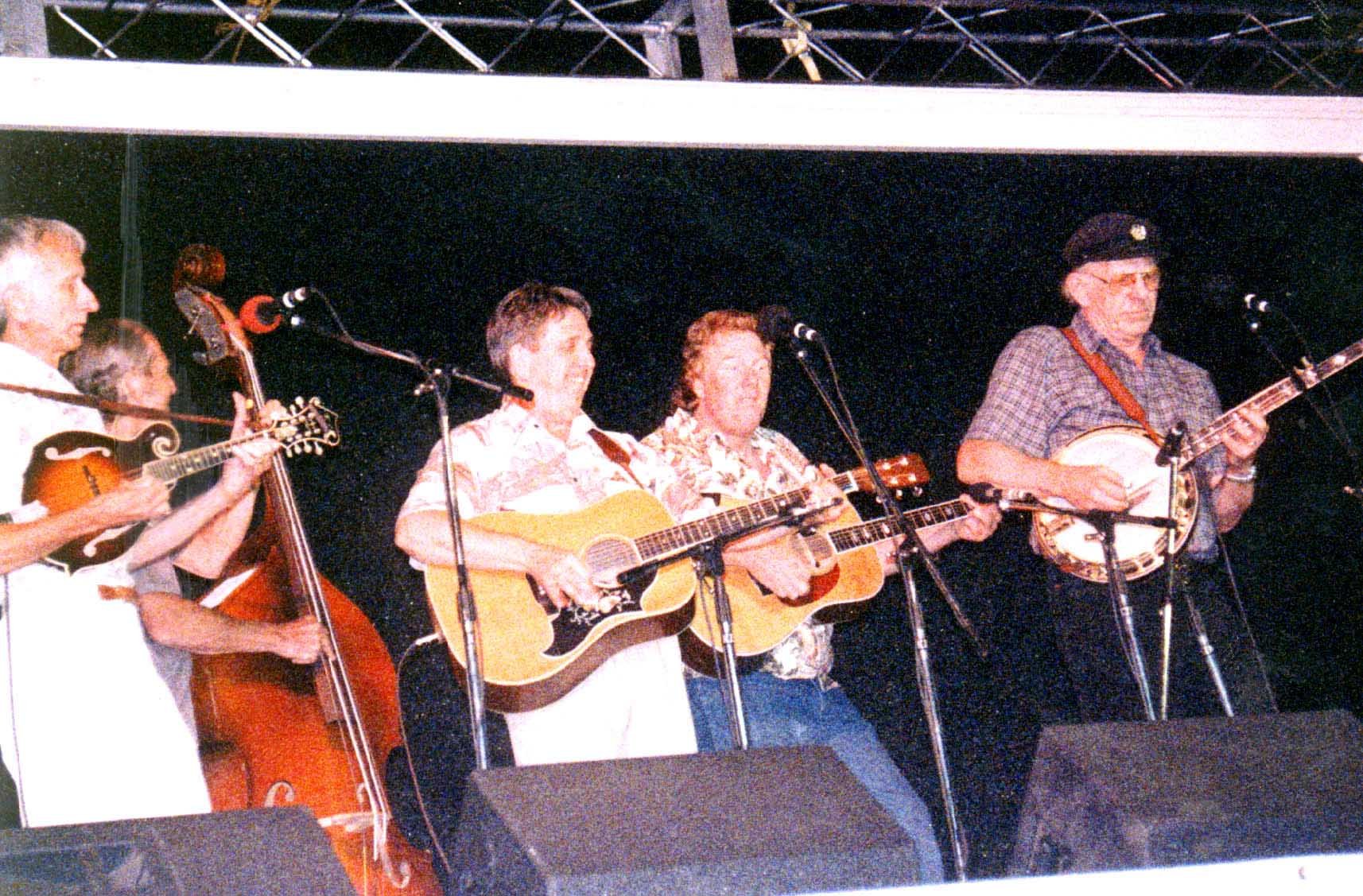
- Doug Dillard (right) with the reunion of the original Dillards
- Studio albums: 4
- Compilation albums: 2
- Singles: 4

Doug Dillard is an American bluegrass banjo player. In addition to his solo albums and recordings with the Dillards and Dillard & Clark, he has been featured as a performer and composer on numerous albums by other artists.

== Solo albums ==
- 1970: The Banjo Album (Together) extended edition released in 2004 on Rural Rhythm
- 1973: Duelin' Banjo (20th Century)
- 1974: You Don't Need A Reason To Sing (20th Century)
- 1979: Heaven (Flying Fish)

== Compilations ==
- 1975: G & D (A&M) with Gene Clark - Netherlands release
- 1992: Glitter Grass From The Nashwood Hollyville Strings / Permanent Wave (Flying Fish) as Dillard / Hartford/ Dillard

== Singles ==
- 1973: "Music Country" (20th Century) promo
- 1973: "My Grass Is Blue" / "Monday Motion" (20th Century)
- 1974: "You Don't Need a Reason (Mono)" / "You Don't Need a Reason (Stereo)" (20th Century) promo
- 1976: "Going Down" / "Poor Old Slave" (Warner Bros.)

== With John Hartford and Rodney Dillard ==
- 1977: Glitter Grass from the Nashwood Hollyville Strings (Flying Fish)
- 1980: Permanent Wave (Flying Fish)

== As a member of The Dillards ==
- 1963: Back Porch Bluegrass (Elektra)
- 1964: Live!!!! Almost!!! (Elektra)
- 1965: Pickin' & Fiddlin' (Elektra) with Byron Berline
- 1981: Homecoming and Family Reunion (Flying Fish)
- 1999: A Long Time Ago: The First Time Live! (Varèse Vintage) recorded live in 1962
- 2008: 32¢ Postage Due (Rising Son) with Arlo Guthrie

== As a member of the Folkswingers ==
- 1963: 12 String Guitar! (World Pacific)
- 1963: 12 String Guitar! Vol. 2 (World Pacific)

== As a member of Dillard & Clark ==
- 1968: The Fantastic Expedition of Dillard & Clark (A&M)
- 1969: Through the Morning, Through the Night (A&M)

== As a member of the Doug Dillard Band ==
- 1980: Jackrabbit! (Flying Fish) with Byron Berline
- 1986: What's That? (Flying Fish)
- 1988: Heartbreak Hotel (Flying Fish)

== As composer ==
- 1965: José Feliciano - The Voice and Guitar of José Feliciano (RCA) - track 4, "Duelin' Banjo" (co-written with Dean Webb, Rodney Dillard, and Mitch Jayne)
- 1970: The Dillards - Copperfields (Elektra) - track 3, "Old Man at the Mill" (co-written with Rodney Dillard, Mitch Jayne, Herb Pedersen, Dean Webb)
- 1974: Gene Clark - No Other (Asylum) - track 8, "Lady Of The North" (co-written with Gene Clark)
- 1978: Country Gazette - From the Beginning (Sunset Records) - track 6, "Aggravation" (co-written with Byron Berline)
- 1979: New Grass Revival - Too Late to Turn Back Now (Flying Fish) - track 2, ""With Care from Someone" (co-written with Bernie Leadon and Gene Clark)
- 1979: New Grass Revival - Barren County (Flying Fish) - track 2, "In The Plan" (co-written with Bernie Leadon and Gene Clark)
- 1985: Skiff Skats - Skiff Skat Stuff (Making Waves) - track 5, "Hickory Hollow"
- 1988: The Dillards - I'll Fly Away (Edsel) - track 12, "Old Man at the Mill" (co-written with Rodney Dillard, Mitch Jayne, Herb Pedersen, Dean Webb)
- 2003: The Good Brothers - One True Thing (Hogtown / UTR) - track 9, "Dooley" (co-written with Rodney Dillard)
- 2007: Tim White - You Asked for It (Fat Dog) - track 2, "Doug's Tune"

== Also appears on ==
=== 1967 - 1970 ===
- 1967: Gene Clark with the Gosdin Brothers - Gene Clark with the Gosdin Brothers (Columbia) - electric banjo on track 5, "Keep On Pushin'"
- 1967: Harpers Bizarre - Anything Goes (Warner Bros.)
- 1967: The Monkees - Pisces, Aquarius, Capricorn & Jones Ltd. (RCA Victor)
- 1968: Glen Campbell - Hey Little One (Capitol)
- 1968: Michael Nesmith - The Wichita Train Whistle Sings (Dot)
- 1970: Arlo Guthrie - Washington County (Reprise)
- 1970: Ron Davies - Silent Song Through The Land (A&M) - banjo on track 5, "Silent Song Through The Land"

=== 1971 - 1975 ===
- 1971: Bob Lind - Since There Were Circles (Capitol)
- 1972: Aztec Two-Step - Aztec Two-Step (Elektra)
- 1972: Larry Groce - Crescentville (Daybreak) - banjo on track 1, "The Bumper Sticker Song"
- 1972: John Henry Kurtz - Reunion (ABC Records)
- 1973: Arlo Guthrie - Last of the Brooklyn Cowboys (Reprise) - banjo on track 7, "Uncle Jeff"
- 1973: Judee Sill - Heart Food (Asylum)
- 1974: Hoyt Axton - Life Machine (A&M)
- 1974: Arlo Guthrie - Arlo Guthrie (Reprise)
- 1975: Harry Nilsson - Duit on Mon Dei (RCA Victor)

=== 1976 - 1979 ===
- 1976: Michael Melford - Mandolin Fantasy (Flying Fish)
- 1976: Steven Fromholz - A Rumor in My Own Time (Capitol)
- 1976: Harry Nilsson - Sandman (RCA Victor)
- 1976: Barry McGuire - C'mon Along (Sparrow)
- 1976: Tom Pacheco - The Outsider (RCA)
- 1977: Byron Berline - Dad's Favorites (Rounder)
- 1977: Gene Clark - Two Sides to Every Story (RSO)
- 1977: Steven Fromholz - Outlaw Blues (Capitol)
- 1978: Hoyt Axton - Free Sailin' (MCA)
- 1979: Mistress - Mistress (RSO)
- 1979: Michael Murphey - Peaks, Valleys, Honky Tonks & Alleys (Epic)

=== 1980 - 1998 ===
- 1980: various artists - Popeye: Original Motion Picture Soundtrack Album (Boardwalk)
- 1984: various artists - The Telluride Festival Tapes (Flying Fish) - track 15, "Jack Rabbit" (The Doug Dillard Band with Byron Berline)
- 1991: Ginger Boatwright - Fertile Ground (Flying Fish)
- 1998: Hayseed - Melic (Watermelon)
- 1999: Mary McCaslin - Rain: The Lost Album (Bear Family)
- 1999: Larry Perkins - Glad Reunion Day (RME)

== Music publications ==
- 1980: The Bluegrass Banjo Style of Douglas Flint Dillard (ALMO / Columbia Pictures Publications) revised edition in 2001, The Classic Douglas Dillard Songbook of 5-String Banjo Tablatures (Centerstream / Hal Leonard)

== Sources ==
- The Dillards Bluegrass Band
- Doug Dillard at AllMusic
- Doug Dillard discography at Discogs
