= Glen Campbell collaborative discography =

- Studio albums: 7
- Compilation albums: 2
- Singles: 9

This article presents the discography of the groups that American singer/guitarist Glen Campbell has played in.

== Albums ==
=== Studio albums ===
Below are listed studio albums by groups of which Glen Campbell was a member at the time. These are all instrumental groups, featuring Campbell on (mainly 12 string) guitar.

| Year | Album | Group | Chart positions | | RIAA | Label |
| Year | Album | Group | US Country | US | RIAA | Label |
|---|---|---|---|---|---|---|
| 1963 | 12 String Guitar! | The Folkswingers | - | 132 | | World Pacific |
| 1963 | 12 String Guitar! Vol. 2 | The Folkswingers | - | - | | World Pacific |
| 1963 | The Swinging 12 String | The in Group | - | - | | In |
| 1964 | Folk Swingin' Harpsichord with 12 String Guitar | The Sidewalk Swingers | - | - | | Warner Bros |
| 1964 | 12 String Dobro | Tut Taylor and the Folkswingers | - | - | | World Pacific |
| 1965 | The Electric 12 | The Bandits | - | - | | World Pacific |
| 1965 | Dylan Jazz | The Gene Norman Group | - | - | | GNP Crescendo |
| 1965 | Mr. 12 String Guitar | Mr. 12 String Guitar | - | - | | World Pacific |

=== Compilations and repackages ===
| Year | Album | Group | Chart positions | | RIAA | Label |
| Year | Album | Group | US Country | US | RIAA | Label |
|---|---|---|---|---|---|---|
| 2003 | The Lost '60s Recordings | The Trophies, The Fleas | - | - | | Varese Sarabande |
| 2009 | The Swinging 12 String | The in Group featuring Glen Campbell | - | - | | Essential Media Group |

== Singles ==
| Date | Title | Group | Label | Record Number | Chart positions | | | Album |
| Date | Title | Group | Label | Record Number | US Country | US | US AC | Album |
|---|---|---|---|---|---|---|---|---|
| 1961 | "Scratchin'" | The Fleas | Challenge | 9115 | – | – | – | single only |
| 1961 | "Tears" | The Fleas | Challenge | 9115 | – | – | – | single only |
| 1962 | "Desire" | The Trophies | Challenge | 9133 | – | – | – | single only |
| 1962 | "Doggone It" | The Trophies | Challenge | 9133 | – | – | – | single only |
| 1962 | "Peg O' My Heart" | The Trophies | Challenge | 9149 | – | – | – | single only |
| 1962 | "I Laughed So Hard I Cried" | The Trophies | Challenge | 9149 | – | – | – | single only |
| 1963 | "Felicia" | The Trophies | Challenge | 9170 | – | – | – | single only |
| 1963 | "That's All I Want from You" | The Trophies | Challenge | 9170 | – | – | – | single only |
| 1963 | "Black Mountain Rag" | The FolkSwingers | World Pacific | 391 promo | – | – | – | 12 String Guitar! |
| 1963 | "This Train" | The FolkSwingers | World Pacific | 391 promo | – | – | – | 12 String Guitar! |
| 1963 | "Don't Think Twice (It's All Right)" | The FolkSwingers | World Pacific | 394 promo | – | – | – | 12 String Guitar! Vol. 2 |
| 1963 | "This Land Is Your Land" | The FolkSwingers | World Pacific | 394 promo | – | – | – | 12 String Guitar! Vol. 2 |
| 1963 | "Amor a Todos" | The FolkSwingers | World Pacific | 396 promo | – | – | – | 12 String Guitar! Vol. 2 |
| 1963 | "12 String Special" | The FolkSwingers | World Pacific | 396 promo | – | – | – | 12 String Guitar! Vol. 2 |
| Sep-65 | "All I Really Want to Do" | Mr. 12 String Guitar | World Pacific | 77803 promo | – | – | – | Mr. 12 String Guitar |
| Sep-65 | "Subterranean Homesick Blues" | Mr. 12 String Guitar | World Pacific | 77803 promo | – | – | – | Mr. 12 String Guitar |
| Sep-66 | "Masters of War" | The Gene Norman Group | GNP-Crescendo | 361 promo | – | – | – | Dylan Jazz |
| Sep-66 | "Don't Think Twice" | The Gene Norman Group | GNP-Crescendo | 361 promo | – | – | – | Dylan Jazz |
