= Tribute to the American Duck =

Studio album by The Dillards
- Released: 1973
- Genre: Country rock
- Label: Poppy; United Artists
- Producer: Rodney Dillard

The Dillards chronology
Roots and Branches (1972)	Tribute to the American Duck (1973)	Country Tracks (1976)

Tribute to the American Duck is the seventh album by American band the Dillards. Released only a year after Roots and Branches, Tribute features the same lineup and a country rock sound. Billy Ray Latham's electric guitar features on "Caney Creek", and rock influences are evident in the song writing and cover choice. The album features a re-recorded version of "Dooley" from the Dillards' debut, Back Porch Bluegrass.

Mitch Jayne again assumes a more subdued role in Tribute, ceding his role as bassist to two electric bass players. He does, however, contribute more to the songwriting of the album than to Roots and Branches, and he makes his debut as a lead vocalist in the final song, "What's Time to a Hog?" Rodney Dillard's wife Linda Dillard begins contributing to the Dillards in this album, singing backup vocals and co-writing "Carry Me Off" with Rodney and Mitch.

== Track listing ==
1. "Music is Music" (Rodney Dillard, Mitch Jayne)
2. "Caney Creek" (I. Alexander)
3. "Dooley" (Rodney Dillard, Mitch Jayne)
4. "Love has Gone Away" (Rodney Dillard, Mitch Jayne)
5. "You've Gotta Be Strong" (Jerry La Mirand)
6. "Carry Me Off" (Linda Dillard, Rodney Dillard, Mitch Jayne)
7. "Smile for Me" (Gary Itri)
8. "Hot Rod Banjo" (Buzz Clifford, J. Henry Burnett, Paul Potash)
9. "Daddy was a Mover" (Rodney Dillard, Mitch Jayne)
10. "What's Time to a Hog?" (Dean Webb, Mitch Jayne)

== Personnel ==
- Rodney Dillard - lead vocals, guitar, dobro
- Billy Ray Latham (spelled "Lathum" throughout the original liner notes) - guitar, banjo, dobro
- Dean Webb - mandolin
- Mitch Jayne - lead vocals on "What's Time to a Hog?"
- John Hartford - fiddle
- Paul York, John Raines, Don Gallese - drums, percussion
- Linda Dillard - backing vocals
- Colin Cameron, Gary Itri - bass
- Irv Dugan - guitar, road manager
- Andrew Belling - keyboards
- Buck Graves - dobro

== Sources ==
- Liner notes of original LP
