= Wheatstraw Suite =

Studio album by the Dillards
- Released: 1968
- Genre: Rock; pop; folk; bluegrass; country
- Length: 27:42
- Label: Elektra
- Producer: Rodney Dillard

The Dillards chronology
Pickin' & Fiddlin' (1965)	Wheatstraw Suite (1968)	Copperfields (1970)

Professional ratings
Review scores
Source	Rating
AllMusic	4.5/5 stars
Rolling Stone	(positive)

Wheatstraw Suite is the fourth album by American band the Dillards. Released in 1968, the album showcased an "unpredictable" mix of bluegrass, country, folk, rock and pop. For the album's sessions, the band recorded with a full orchestra, electric instrumentation and occasional drums.

The band had been moving toward a more contemporary sound for a few years (they toured with the Byrds, featuring founding banjoist Doug Dillard on a Rickenbacker-built electric version of his instrument and future Buffalo Springfield drummer Dewey Martin), but Wheatstraw Suite was the first time they explored the new sound on a full-length album. The seeds of the album began when the Dillards briefly left Elektra Records, which had released their first three records but was "surprisingly resistant" to the band's new sound. The group recorded a few folk rock singles for Capitol Records, including different versions of a few of Wheatstraw Suite's songs. Capitol, however, soon grew unsympathetic toward the Dillards' style, and they re-signed with Elektra, which was now willing to try the new, more commercial sound.

However, Doug Dillard was unhappy with the new direction and abruptly left the group. Ironically, he would soon be performing a similar type of country rock with former Byrd Gene Clark as Dillard & Clark. The Dillards recruited multi-instrumentalist Herb Pedersen to replace Doug on banjo. The loss of Doug proved to be advantageous to the group, as Pedersen also contributed guitar and shared lead vocal duties with Rodney Dillard.

The group had already stockpiled plenty of material during their stint with Capitol and brief hiatus from recording. The album features seven original songs and six covers—the covers being drawn mostly from contemporary rock and pop musicians rather than traditionals. The Dillards' blend between pop and bluegrass on this album paved the way for a generation of country- and folk-rockers, making it potentially their most influential album. Critics hailed Wheatstraw Suite as the band's masterwork.

== Release history ==
Wheatstraw Suite was re-released on CD by Collector's Choice Music in 2002, along with Copperfields, its 1970 follow-up album.

== Track listing ==
1. "I'll Fly Away" (Albert E. Brumley) - :39
2. "Nobody Knows" (Mitch Jayne, Rodney Dillard) - 2:15
3. "Hey Boys" (The Dillards) - 2:27
4. "The Biggest Whatever" (Mitch Jayne, Rodney Dillard) - 2:15
5. "Listen to the Sound" (Herb Pedersen, Mitch Jayne) - 2:36
6. "Little Pete" (Herb Pedersen) - 1:58
7. "Reason to Believe" (Tim Hardin) - 2:25
8. "Single Saddle" (Arthur Altman, Hal David) - 1:22
9. "I've Just Seen a Face" (John Lennon, Paul McCartney) - 1:55
10. "Lemon Chimes" (Bill Martin, Rodney Dillard) - 3:12
11. "Don't You Cry" (The Dillards) - 1:50
12. "Bending the Strings" (Allen Shelton) - 1:26
13. "She Sang Hymns Out of Tune" (Jesse Lee Kincaid) - 3:20

== Personnel ==
The Dillards

- Rodney Dillard - lead vocal, rhythm and lead guitars, Dobro, pedal steel
- Herb Pedersen - lead vocal, Nashville rhythm guitar, banjo
- Dean Webb - mandolin
- Mitch Jayne - acoustic bass

Additional personnel

- Buddy Emmons - pedal steel
- Joe Osborn - electric bass
- Toxey French - drums
- Jimmy Gordon - drums

== Sources ==
- Liner notes of the Collector's Choice reissue of Wheatstraw Suite, written by Richie Unterberger.
