= List of country rock musicians =

This alphabetical list of country rock bands and artists covers a wide variety of subgenres.

The year following the artist's name is the first year of the artist's musical career.

== A ==
- Ryan Adams (2000)
- Trace Adkins (1987)
- Alabama (1976)
- Jason Aldean (2005)
- The Allman Brothers Band (1969)
- America (1970)
- Amazing Rhythm Aces (1974)
- Atlanta Rhythm Section (1971)

== B ==
- The Bacon Brothers (1995)
- The Band (1964)
- The Band Perry (2005)
- Casey Barnes (2006)
- Big & Rich (1998)
- Blackberry Smoke (2000)
- Blackfoot (1972)
- Blue Mountain (1993)
- Blue Rodeo (1984)
- Jackson Browne (1972)
- BR549 (1993)
- Brothers Osborne (2012)
- Buffalo Springfield (1966)
- Jimmy Buffett (1965)
- The Byrds (1964)

== C ==
- The Cadillac Three (Current)
- Glen Campbell (1958)
- Neko Case (1997)
- Johnny Cash (1954)
- The Chicks (1997)
- Eric Church (2004)
- Gene Clark (1963)
- Cold Creek County (2013)
- Commander Cody and His Lost Planet Airmen (1967)
- Ry Cooder (1967)
- Cowboy (1969)
- Billy "Crash" Craddock (1957)
- Crazy Horse (1971)
- Creedence Clearwater Revival (1968)
- Crosby, Stills & Nash (1969)
- Cross Canadian Ragweed (1994)
- Sheryl Crow (1987)
- Cui Jian (1984)

== D ==
- D.A.D. (1982)
- Charlie Daniels (1958)
- Mac Davis (1968)
- Travis Denning (2012)
- The Desert Rose Band (1985)
- The Doobie Brothers (1970)
- Dr. Hook (1967)
- Drive-By Truckers (1996)
- Bob Dylan (1961)

== E ==
- Eagles (1971)
- Steve Earle (1974)
- The Everly Brothers (1957)

== F ==
- Fifth on the Floor (2006)
- Firefall (1974)
- Florida Georgia Line (2010)
- The Flying Burrito Brothers (1968)
- John Fogerty (1973)

== G ==
- Brantley Gilbert (2005)
- Gin Blossoms (1987)
- Goose Creek Symphony (1968)
- The Grateful Dead (1965)

== H ==
- Hardy (2018)
- Emmylou Harris (1969)
- John Hiatt (1972)
- Hootie and the Blowfish (1986)

== I ==
- The International Submarine Band (1966)

== J ==
- Shooter Jennings (1996)
- Waylon Jennings (1958)
- Jaimin Rajani (2022)

== K ==
- The Kentucky Headhunters (1968)
- Kid Rock (1988)
- Chris Knight (1998)
- Kris Kristofferson (1970)

== L ==
- Lakeview (2019)
- Griffin Layne (2007)
- Aaron Lewis (1990)
- Jenny Lewis & The Watson Twins (2006)
- Jerry Lee Lewis (1954)
- Gordon Lightfoot (1958)
- Little Feat (1969)
- Loggins and Messina (1971)
- The Long Ryders (1982)
- The Los Dos Bros (1992)
- Nick Lowe (1966)
- Lynyrd Skynyrd (1965)

== M ==
- Cory Marks (2014)
- The Marshall Tucker Band (1972)
- Martina McBride (1991)
- Mason Proffit (1969)
- Cory Marks (2014)
- Tim McGraw (1990)
- Jason Charles Miller (2009)
- Montgomery Gentry (1999)
- Justin Moore (2009)
- Kip Moore (2008)
- Michael Martin Murphey (1972)

== N ==
- Nashville West (1967)
- Ricky Nelson (1957)
- Willie Nelson (1973)
- Michael Nesmith (1965)
- The New Riders of the Purple Sage (1969)
- The Nitty Gritty Dirt Band (1966)
- Ted Nugent (1958)

== O ==
- Old 97's (1992)
- The Outlaws (1967)
- The Ozark Mountain Daredevils (1972)

== P ==
- Brad Paisley (1999)
- Gram Parsons (1963)
- Pirates of the Mississippi (1987)
- Poco (1968)
- Elvis Presley (1953)
- Mason Proffit (1969)
- Pure Prairie League (1970)

== R ==
- Eddie Rabbitt (1964)
- Rascal Flatts (1999)
- Reckless Kelly (1997)
- The Rockingbirds (1990)
- Rocky and the Natives (2011)
- Kenny Rogers (1958)
- Linda Ronstadt (1967)
- Darius Rucker (1986)

== S ==
- Dallas Smith (1999)
- Shocking Blue (1969)
- Social Distortion (1978)
- Son Volt (1995)
- JD Souther (1972)
- Souther-Hillman-Furay Band (1973)
- Southern Pacific (1983)
- Chris Stapleton (2001)
- Sugarland (2003)

== T ==
- A Thousand Horses (2010)
- The Tractors (1993)
- Treaty Oak Revival (2018)
- Travis Tritt (1989)
- Steven Tyler (1975)

== U ==
- Uncle Kracker (1999)
- Uncle Tupelo (1987)
- Carrie Underwood (2005)
- Keith Urban (1990)

== W ==
- Jerry Jeff Walker (1971)
- Warumpi Band (1980)
- Whiskeytown (1994)
- Clarence White (1954)
- The Whybirds (2006)
- Wilco (1994)
- Hank Williams, Jr. (1957)
- Hank Williams III (1991)
- The Wolverines (1994)
- Bob Woodruff (1994)

== Y ==
- Neil Young (1966)

== Z ==
- Zac Brown Band (2002)
