= Jim Dickson (producer) =

American record producer (1931–2011)

- Born: James Thomas Buchanan Dickson; January 17, 1931; Los Angeles, California, U.S.
- Died: April 19, 2011 (aged 80)
- Occupation: Record producer

James Thomas Buchanan Dickson (January 17, 1931 – April 19, 2011) was an American record producer, music publisher and audio engineer who worked during the 1960s.

== Background ==
He was born in Los Angeles, California, son of a diesel engineer in the United States Navy. He was an avid sailor as a teenager, and enlisted in the United States Army in 1946 before he embarked on a career in the recording industry as a self-taught record producer and band manager.

== Career ==
Before producing the first Elektra Records bluegrass records he produced his first record, an LP on his own label, Vaya. He eventually sold the rights of Lord Buckley's 1955 album Hipsters, Flipsters and Finger Poppin' Daddies, Knock Me Your Lobes to Elektra and it was in print for another 25 years. Jim Dickson was the lone individual behind Elektra Records Los Angeles bluegrass albums. In 1962 he produced his first bluegrass record for Elektra called Dian and the Greenbriar Boys by the Greenbriar Boys and a Hollywood country singer, Dian James. While working on the collaboration between Greenbriar Boys and Dian James, Dickson discovered the Dillards and with the help of Ralph Rinzler convinced Elektra Records that they were a good bluegrass group. He would go on to produce three of their records, 1963's Back Porch Bluegrass, 1964's Live!!!! Almost!!! and 1965's Pickin' and Fiddlin' which featured fiddler, Byron Berline. Rosenberg notes that Pickin' and Fiddlin' "was unlike any previous bluegrass album; it was an LP of old-time fiddle music played to bluegrass backing". Dickson was behind the first ever recording of a Bob Dylan song by a bluegrass band, The Dillards recording of Bob Dylan's "Walkin' Down the Line" on their 1964 album Live!!!! Almost!!!

Dickson had started work with blues singer Luke "Long Gone" Miles in early 1964. Backing Miles was Willie Chambers on guitar and Leroy Vinnegar on bass. The album, Country Born was released in April 1964. The LP was released in April 1964 on World Pacific WP 1820.

In addition to the three records he produced for the Dillards, Dickson, now working as an independent producer, produced the best-selling instrumental album, 12 String Guitar! for studio project The Folkswingers and 12 String Guitar! Vol. 2. These records featured Glen Campbell on the twelve string guitar along with the Dillards as the backing band to make up the Folkswingers. These records included traditionals as well as songs written by Woody Guthrie, Pete Seeger, Ma Rainey, Lead Belly, Merle Travis, A.P. Carter, and Bob Dylan. Dickson was very adamant about the recording of Dylan tunes.

According to Neil Rosenberg Dickson was instrumental in bridging the gaps between folk, country, and bluegrass music. Rosenberg also notes that Dickson played an important role in the synthesis of folk and rock music. This began with his discovery of the Hillmen. He recorded and produced their only album, The Hillmen, in a three-month period at the end of 1963 and beginning of 1964. It was not officially released by Elektra Records until 1969. Chris Hillman would later go on to help form The Byrds, with whom Dickson worked closely as a manager. Dickson persuaded them to record Bob Dylan's "Mr. Tambourine Man" which reached number one on both the Billboard Hot 100 chart and the UK Singles Chart, as well as becoming the title track of their first album, Mr. Tambourine Man.

Dickson also co-produced two albums by The Flying Burrito Brothers, 1970's Burrito Deluxe and 1971's The Flying Burrito Bros; both records feature Bob Dylan songs.
