= Country Born =

Country Born may refer to:

== Literature ==
- Country Born, a novel by Linda Lael Miller, 2022

== Music ==
- Country Born (Luke "Long Gone" Miles album), 1964
- "Country Born", single by Magna Carta, 1992
- Country Born, album by Drew Baldridge, 2022
