= Aberra =

Aberra is both a given name and a surname most common to Ethiopia. Notable people with the name include:

- Amsale Aberra (1954–2018), American fashion designer
- Aberra Kassa (1905–1936), Ethiopian noble and military leader
