= Live!!!! Almost!!! =

Live...Almost!!!

Live album by The Dillards
- Released: 1964
- Venue: The Mecca, Los Angeles
- Genre: Bluegrass
- Length: 42:00 (approximate)
- Label: Elektra
- Producer: Jim Dickson

The Dillards chronology
Back Porch Bluegrass (1963)	Live...Almost!!! (1964)	Pickin' & Fiddlin' (1965)

Live...Almost!!! is the second album by bluegrass quartet The Dillards, recorded live at The Mecca, Los Angeles, in front of a clearly appreciative audience. The Dillards perform with a lot of spirit, warmth and enjoyment, which seems to have been their usual approach: "There isn't a song that the Dillards do that they don't thoroughly enjoy, and they do them with equal enthusiasm on the back porch, or in concert before five thousand people".

The album contains an equal mixture of traditional songs and ones penned by the band, plus a few cover versions - including "Walkin' Down the Line" by a then up-and-coming young artist: "I don't know how many of you know who Bobby Dylan is, but he's probably done more for folk music or had more influence than anybody. He has a voice that's very much like a dog with its leg caught in barbed wire, but that doesn't matter..."

In addition to some fast bluegrass and slower, more folky songs, the album is full of humour, with Mitch Jayne providing some very witty stories by way of introduction to some of the songs: notably with "Old Blue" (involving outdoor privies, dogs and Joan Baez), and "Pretty Polly" (a song in which a boy "scrags his girlfriend".) The entertainment continues on "Taters in Sandy Land": "Rodney finally gets to play his harmonica, after I get disgusted and cram it in his mouth endways. What amazes the audience is the fact that he plays it that way, no hands!" Finally in the closing track, "Buckin' mule", Rodney Dillard forgets his words and when prompted to simply make some up, delivers a few verses that really crack up the audience.

== Release and reception ==
Professional ratings
Review scores
Source	Rating
Allmusic	4/5 stars

The album was originally released in 1964 on Elektra: EKL-265 (mono) and EKS-7265 (stereo).

It was reissued by Elektra in 2001 as a double CD together with their debut album Back Porch Bluegrass.

== Track listing ==
1. "Black Eyed Susie" (Traditional) – 2:20
2. "Never See My Home Again" (Rodney Dillard, Mitch Jayne ) – 3:17
3. "There Is a Time" (Rodney Dillard, Mitch Jayne) – 2:46
4. "Old Blue" (Traditional) – 5:30
5. "Sinkin' Creek" (Douglas Dillard) – 2:27
6. "The Whole World Round" (Joe Stuart, Mitch Jayne) – 3:25
7. "Liberty!" (Traditional) – 2:24
8. "Dixie Breakdown" (Don Reno) – 2:27
9. "Walkin' Down the Line" (Bob Dylan) – 2:55
10. "Jody's Tune" (Rodney Dillard, Dean Webb) – 2:27
11. "Pretty Polly" (Traditional) – 4:58
12. "Taters in Sandy Lane/Gimme Chaw T'Baccer" (Homer E. Dillard Sr.) – 3:41
13. "Buckin' Mule" (Traditional) – 4:09

== Personnel ==
The Dillards

- Rodney Dillard - lead vocals, acoustic guitar, harmonica, mandolin
- Douglas Dillard - banjo, guitar, vocals
- Mitchell Jayne - acoustic bass, vocals
- Dean Webb - mandolin, vocals

Technical

- Jac Holzman - production supervisor
- Jim Dickson - producer, recording, editoring
- William S. Harvey - cover design, photography
