= Dillards =

Dillards may refer to:

- Dillard's, a major department store chain in the United States
- The Dillards, a progressive bluegrass band
