= Country rock =

Music genre

- Stylistic origins: Rock; country
- Cultural origins: Mid 1960s and early 1970s, Southern and Western United States
- Derivative forms: Roots rock; Southern rock; Heartland rock; cowpunk; alternative country

Fusion genres
- Bakersfield sound; country metal; cowpunk

Other topics
- Country folk; country pop; progressive country; outlaw country; Texas country

Country rock is a music genre that fuses rock and country. It was developed by rock musicians who began to record country-flavored records and country musicians who implemented rock flavor into country records in the mid 1960s and early 1970s. These musicians recorded records blending rock with country themes, vocal styles, and additional instrumentation, most characteristically pedal steel guitars. Country rock began in the late 60s, reaching its greatest popularity in the 1970s. Country rock also influenced artists in other genres, as well as playing a part in the development of Southern rock.

== Definition and etymology ==
There has also been cross-pollination throughout the history of both genres; however, the term "country-rock" is sometimes used to refer to the wave of rock musicians of the mid 1960s and early 1970s who began recording rock songs with country themes, vocal styles, and additional instrumentation, most characteristically pedal steel guitars. John Einarson states that, "[f]rom a variety of perspectives and motivations, these musicians either played country with a rock & roll attitude, or added a country feel to rock, or folk, or bluegrass. There was no formula".

The term country rock had rarely been heard until the critic Richard Goldstein used it the June 6, 1968 issue of The Village Voice. In his piece, titled "Country Rock: Can Y'All Dig It?", Goldstein counted several artists as moving towards country-friendly material – including Moby Grape, Stone Poneys, Buffy Sainte-Marie, the International Submarine Band and Bob Dylan – but he expected the Byrds' forthcoming album, Sweetheart of the Rodeo, to represent the new genre. Before the Byrds' album was released in August 1968, Goldstein considered the Band's debut album, Music From Big Pink, as the "first major album" of the country-rock movement when he reviewed it for The New York Times on August 4. Key to the genre, Goldstein wrote, was that the album had country music's "twang and ... tenacity", but it also "[made] you want to move" like rock music.

== History ==
=== Origins ===
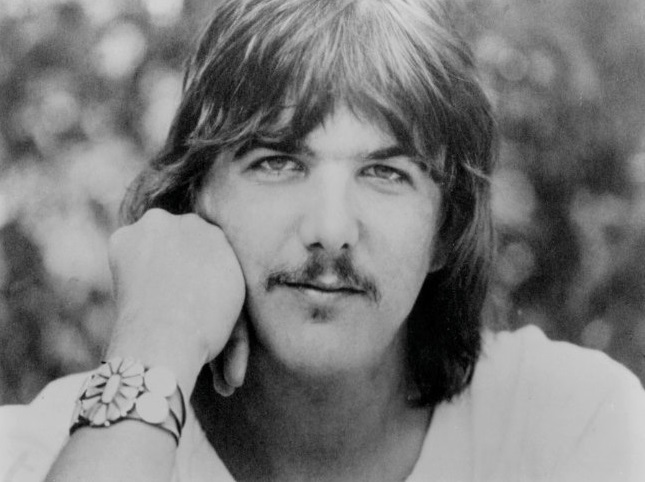
Gram Parsons in 1972

Country rock incorporates musical elements and songwriting from 1960s country into modern rock music of the time. Country rock, primarily developed in Los Angeles, grew off the back of many southern Americans moving to Los Angeles, the growth of the commercial recording studio sound, and the adoption of main stream production techniques popularized by rock musicians of the era.

Country influences can be heard on rock records through the 1960s, including the Beatles' 1964 recordings "I'll Cry Instead", "Baby's in Black", "I Don't Want to Spoil the Party", and their 1965 recording "I've Just Seen A Face", the Byrds' 1965 cover version of Porter Wagoner's "Satisfied Mind", or the Rolling Stones "High and Dry" (1966), as well as Buffalo Springfield's "Go and Say Goodbye" (1966) and "Kind Woman" (1968). According to The Encyclopedia of Country Music, the Beatles' "I Don't Want to Spoil the Party", their cover of the Buck Owens country hit "Act Naturally" and their 1965 album Rubber Soul can all be seen "with hindsight" as examples of country rock.

Former TV teen idol and rockabilly recording artist Ricky Nelson pioneered the Country Rock sound as the frontman for his Stone Canyon Band and recorded the 1966 album Bright Lights & Country Music and the 1967 album Country Fever. Bassist Randy Meisner joined briefly in 1970 after leaving Poco and before joining Eagles.

In 1966, as many rock artists moved increasingly towards expansive and experimental psychedelia, Bob Dylan spearheaded the back-to-basics roots revival when he went to Nashville to record the album Blonde on Blonde, playing with notable local musicians like Charlie McCoy. This, and the subsequent more clearly country-influenced albums, John Wesley Harding (1967) and Nashville Skyline (1969), have been seen as creating the genre of country folk, a route pursued by a number of, largely acoustic, folk musicians.

Dylan's lead was also followed by the Byrds, who were joined by Gram Parsons in 1968. Parsons had mixed country with rock, blues and folk to create what he called "Cosmic American Music". Earlier in the year Parsons had released Safe at Home (although the principal recording for the album had taken place in mid-1967) with the International Submarine Band, which made extensive use of pedal steel and is seen by some as the first true country-rock album. The result of Parsons' brief tenure in the Byrds was Sweetheart of the Rodeo (1968), generally considered one of the finest and most influential recordings in the genre. The Byrds continued in the same vein, but Parsons left before the album was released to join another ex-Byrds member Chris Hillman in forming the Flying Burrito Brothers. The Byrds hired guitarist Clarence White and drummer Gene Parsons, both from the country band Nashville West. The Flying Burrito Brothers recorded the albums The Gilded Palace of Sin (1969) and Burrito Deluxe (1970), which helped establish the respectability and parameters of the genre, before Parsons departed to pursue a solo career.

=== Expansion ===
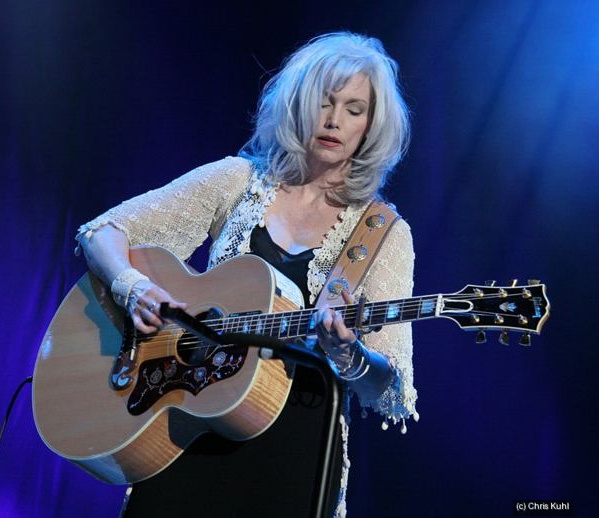
Emmylou Harris playing in Rotterdam, Netherlands (2006)

Country rock was a particularly popular style in the California music scene of the late 1960s, and was adopted by bands including Hearts and Flowers, Poco (formed by Richie Furay and Jim Messina, formerly of the Buffalo Springfield) and New Riders of the Purple Sage. Some folk-rockers followed the Byrds into the genre, among them the Beau Brummels and the Nitty Gritty Dirt Band. A number of performers also enjoyed a renaissance by adopting country sounds, including: the Beatles, who re-explored elements of country in songs such as "Rocky Raccoon" and "Don't Pass Me By" from their 1968 self-titled double album (often referred to as the "White Album"), and "Octopus's Garden" from Abbey Road (1969); The Everly Brothers, whose Roots album (1968) is usually considered some of their finest work; John Fogerty, who left Creedence Clearwater Revival behind for the country sounds of the Blue Ridge Rangers (1972); Mike Nesmith, who had experimented with country sounds while with the Monkees, formed the First National Band; and Neil Young who moved in and out of the genre throughout his career. One of the few acts to successfully move from the country side towards rock were the bluegrass band the Dillards. Doug Dillard left the band to form the group Dillard & Clark with ex-Byrds member Gene Clark and Bernie Leadon.

=== Peak ===
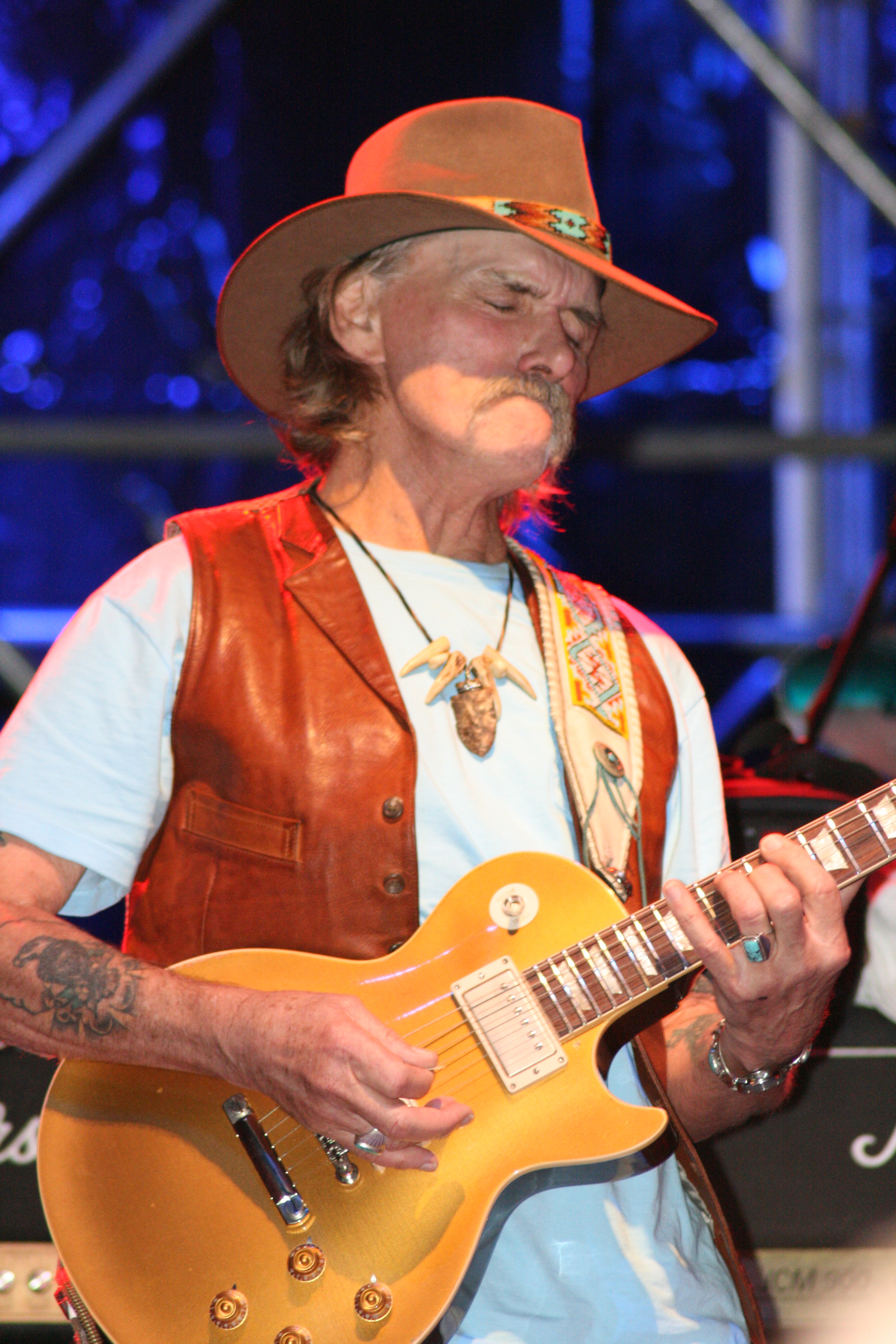
Dickey Betts of the Allman Brothers Band, brought elements of country rock into the band during the 1970s

The greatest commercial success for country rock came in the 1970s, with the Doobie Brothers mixing in elements of R&B, Emmylou Harris (the former singer with Parsons) becoming a star on country radio, and Linda Ronstadt, the "queen of country-rock", creating a highly successful pop-oriented brand of the genre. Pure Prairie League, formed in Ohio in 1970 by Craig Fuller, had both critical and commercial success with five straight Top 40 LP releases, including Bustin' Out (1972), acclaimed by AllMusic critic Richard Foss as "an album that is unequaled in country-rock", and Two Lane Highway, described by Rolling Stone as "a worthy companion to the likes of the Byrds' Sweetheart of the Rodeo and other gems of the genre". Former Poco and Buffalo Springfield member Jim Messina joined Kenny Loggins in a very successful duo, while former members of Ronstadt's backing band went on to form the Eagles (two members of which were from the Flying Burrito Brothers and Poco), who emerged as one of the most successful rock acts of all time, producing albums that included Desperado (1973) and Hotel California (1976). However, the principal country rock influence in the Eagles came from Bernie Leadon, formerly of the Flying Burrito Brothers, and the Eagles are perceived as shifting towards hard rock after he left the band in late 1975. The Ozark Mountain Daredevils had hit singles "If You Wanna Get To Heaven" (1974) and "Jackie Blue" (1975), the latter of which peaked at #3 on the Billboard Hot 100 in 1975. The Bellamy Brothers had the hit "Let Your Love Flow"(1976). In 1979, the Southern rock Charlie Daniels Band moved to a more country direction, released a song with strong bluegrass influence, "The Devil Went Down to Georgia", and the song crossed over and became a hit on the pop chart.

== Legacy ==
Outside its handful of stars, country rock's greatest significance was on artists in other genres, including the Band, Grateful Dead, Creedence Clearwater Revival, the Rolling Stones, and George Harrison's solo work. It also played a part in the development of Southern rock, which, although largely derived from blues rock, had a distinct southern lilt, and it paved the way for parts of the alternative country movement. The genre declined in popularity in the late-1970s, but some established artists, including Neil Young, have continued to record country-tinged rock into the 21st century. Japan even took influence in the 70s with country rock mainly in the kayokyoku genre. Artists such as Takuro Yoshida, Lily and Saori Minami have often dabbled with country rock in their music. Country rock has survived as a cult force in Texas, where acts including the Flatlanders, Joe Ely, Butch Hancock, Jimmie Dale Gilmore, and California-based Richard Brooker have collaborated and recorded. Other performers have produced occasional recordings in the genre, including Elvis Costello's Almost Blue (1981) and the Robert Plant and Alison Krauss collaboration Raising Sand, which was one of the most commercially successful albums of 2007. Kid Rock, who broke through into mainstream success with a rap rock sound, gradually developed a country rock sound. In 2013, British country rock band Rocky and the Natives released Let's Hear It for the Old Guys with two American members, drummer Andy Newmark and acoustic guitarist Bob Rafkin. Rafkin had written "Lazy Waters" for The Byrds from the 1971 album Farther Along, and Andy Newmark had played on the 1973 Gene Parsons album Kindling. Canadian country rock band Blue Rodeo has found considerable success in Canada, selling multi-platinum albums throughout the 1980s and 1990s, and continues to receive frequent radio airplay on Canadian radio stations. Later in 2013 Rocky and the Natives' country rock cover of John Lennon's "Tight A$" was included on the Lennon Bermuda album.

A revival of country music blended with rock features in the 2020s was titled "ronky tonk" in the music press, with acts such as Zach Bryan, Jackson Dean, and Bailey Zimmerman identified by Billboard. Jelly Roll is another crossover artist that blends a unique fashion of country and rock, sometimes with hip hop influences.

== Country metal ==
Country metal
- Stylistic origins: Country; country rock; heavy metal
- Cultural origins: 2000s

Subgenres
- Countrycore

Other topics
- Southern metal

Country metal is the fusion country music elements with heavy metal.

In 2002, Kid Rock was quoted in Variety describing himself as a "country-metal-rap hillbilly". In 2006, David Allan Coe featuring Dimebag Darrell, Vinnie Paul, and Rex Brown, all from Pantera, released the collaborative album Rebel Meets Rebel, which Allmusic described as a "groundbreaking" mix of country and heavy metal, and noted that fiddle is included, being played by Joey Floyd. Billboard also noted that Jason Aldean's thunderous 2008 single "She's Country" received comparisons to AC/DC. Brantley Gilbert, Hardy, & Lakeview have been described as country metal, with Hardy incorporating nu metal elements into his sound.

Countrycore is a genre term created by the media to describe the style of Brazilian band Matanza, who fuse country music with heavy metal and hardcore punk.

== See also ==
- List of country rock albums
- List of country rock musicians

== Sources ==
- Hjort, Christopher (2008). So You Want to Be a Rock 'n' Roll Star: The Byrds Day-by-Day 1965–1973. London: Jawbone Press. ISBN 978-1-906002-15-2.
