= Back Porch Bluegrass =

Studio album by The Dillards
- Released: 1963
- Genre: Bluegrass
- Length: 31:56
- Label: Elektra
- Producer: Jim Dickson

The Dillards chronology
Back Porch Bluegrass (1963)	Live!!!! Almost!!! (1964)

Professional ratings
Review scores
Source	Rating
AllMusic	4.5/5 stars
The Encyclopedia of Popular Music	3/5 stars
The Rolling Stone Album Guide	3/5 stars

Back Porch Bluegrass is the debut album by American band the Dillards, released in 1963. "Dooley" and "Duelin' Banjo" were released as singles.

== Critical reception ==
The Encyclopedia of Popular Music wrote that the album helped to establish the group "as one of America's leading traditional acts, although purists denigrated the band's sometimes irreverent attitude." MusicHound Folk: The Essential Album Guide wrote that it contains a "smokin' version of 'Dueling Banjos' 10 years before Deliverance."

== Track listing ==
1. "Old Joseph" (Traditional, arranged and adapted by Douglas Dillard and Dean Webb) – 1:25
2. "Somebody Touched Me" (Traditional) – 2:23
3. "Polly Vaughn" (Traditional, arranged and adapted with new lyrics by Rodney Dillard) – 2:45
4. "Banjo in the Hollow" (Douglas Dillard) – 1:45
5. "Dooley" (Mitch Jayne, Rodney Dillard) – 2:02
6. "Lonesome Indian" (Traditional) – 1:46
7. "Ground Hog" (Traditional) – 2:00
8. "Old Home Place" (Dean Webb, Mitch Jayne) – 2:05
9. "Hickory Hollow" (Douglas Dillard) – 2:00
10. "Old Man at the Mill" (Traditional) – 1:45
11. "Doug's Tune" (Douglas Dillard) – 2:13
12. "Rainin' Here This Mornin'" (Grandpa Jones) – 3:07
13. "Cold Trailin'" (Rodney Dillard) – 2:15
14. "Reuben's Train" (Traditional, arranged and adapted by J. Nevel) – 2:15
15. "Duelin' Banjo" (adapted and arranged by the Dillards) – 2:10

== Personnel ==
The Dillards

- Rodney Dillard - lead vocals, guitar
- Douglas Dillard - banjo
- Mitchell Jayne - bass
- Dean Webb - mandolin
