= List of events at Maxwell C. King Center for the Performing Arts =

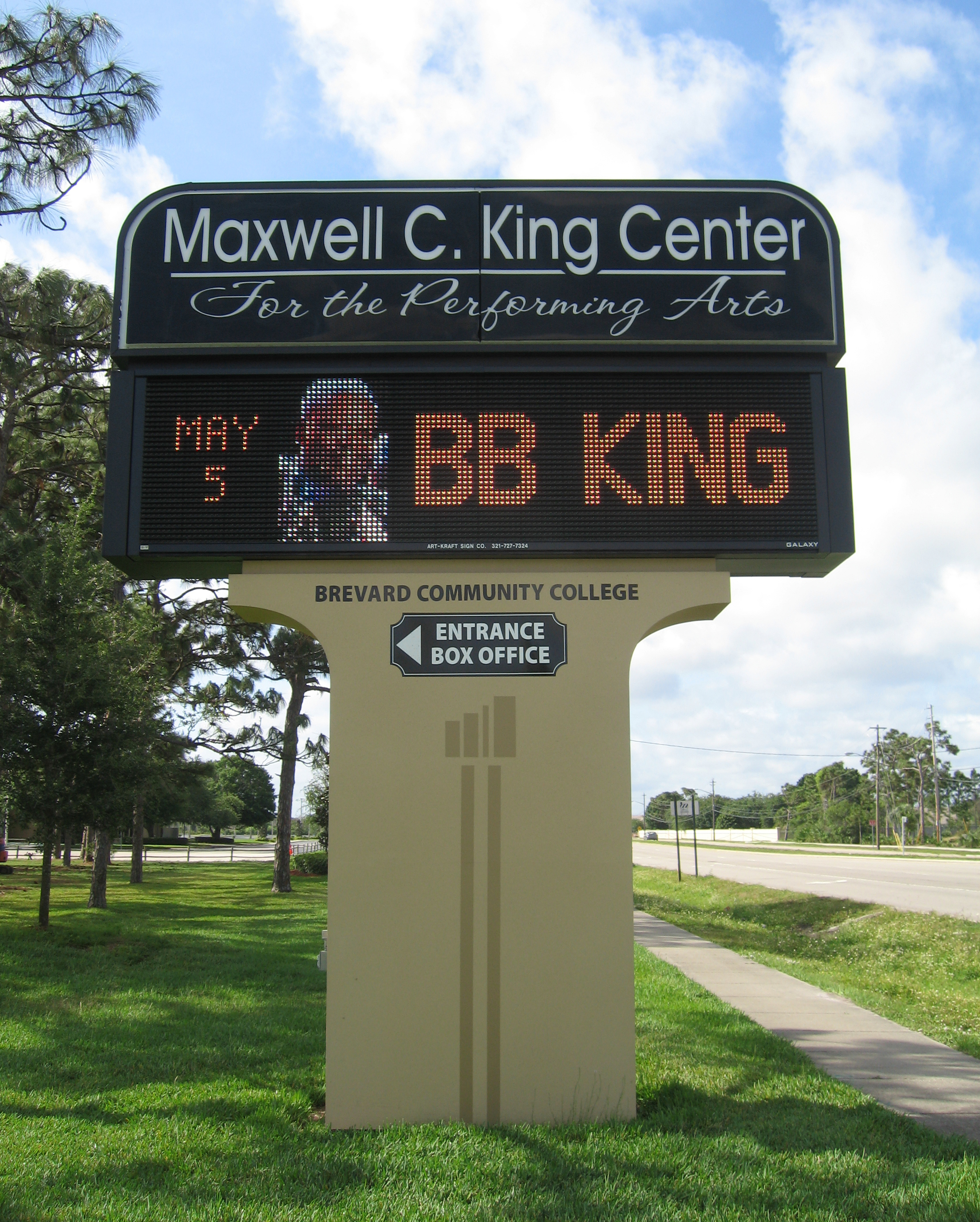
Marquee sign at the King Center

2026

- April 11, Tommy Castro and the Painkillers at the Studio Theatre
- March 9, Cheap Trick, opening act was Jason Hatem
- January 21, Diana Krall

2025

- October 5, Rick Springfield and Richard Marx
- September 3, George Thorogood and the Destroyers
- April 13, Beth Hart, opening act was Hot Pink
- March 21, Little River Band
- February 20, Chris Botti with special guests Leonardo Amuedo, Anastasiia Mazurok, John Splithoff and Veronica Swift
- February 6, Kenny Wayne Shepherd Band
- February 6, Jim Messina & The Road Runners at the Studio Theatre

2024

- November 9, Kool & the Gang
- October 18, Billy Ocean
- April 12, Ghalia Volt, Tab Benoit at the Studio Theatre
- March 14, Paul Anka
- February 27, Adrian Vandenberg, Geoff Tate
- February 23, The Jerry Douglas Band at the Studio Theatre
- February 22, Gary Mule Deer, Johnny Mathis
- January 25, Lou Gramm

2023

- November 19, Henry Rollins (spoken word) at the Studio Theatre
- March 10, Joe Bonamassa
- February 26, Frankie Valli and the Four Seasons
- February 23, Al Stewart, America
- January 22, Styx

2022

- June 16, Robby Krieger of the Doors

2021

- June 4, Hot Tuna

2020

- March 12, Steve Tyrell at the Studio Theatre
- January 21, Indigo Girls, opening act was Kristy Lee
- January 17, David Bromberg Quintet at the Studio Theatre, opening act was Brad Ray
- January 3, Donna the Buffalo at the Studio Theatre

2019

- April 27, Craig Chaquico at the Studio Theatre
- February 16, Alan Parsons Project
- January 17, Pablo Cruise

2018

- October 28, Lindsey Buckingham, opening act was J.S. Ondara
- February 28, Jorma Kaukonen at the Studio Theatre

2017

- July 21, Ace Frehley, opening act was local band Vibe
- June 30, Al Stewart, Ambrosia and Firefall
- April 15, Dick Dale, opening act was Stephen Cotta at the Studio Theatre
- March 19, The Charlie Daniels Band, opening act was the Scooter Brown Band

2016

- July 21, Ted Nugent, opening act was The Raskins
- June 11, KC and the Sunshine Band, Blue Öyster Cult, Orleans
- May 19, The Monkees
- March 18, George Thorogood and the Destroyers, opening act was the Outlaws
- March 3, Herb Alpert & Lani Hall
- February 13, Dave Mason
- January 24, Arlo Guthrie, opening act was the Sarah Lee Guthrie

2015

- November 12, Yes
- November 11, America
- October 30, Kansas
- August 19, John Hiatt and Taj Mahal
- August 8, Jorma Kaukonen at the Studio Theatre
- May 15, John Mayall
- May 6, Boston
- April 23, Celtic Woman
- February 14, Gordon Lightfoot
- January 14, Foreigner

2014

- December 10, Hall & Oates
- November 12, Heart
- October 22, Ringo Starr & His All-Starr Band
- March 28, The Moody Blues
- February 16, The Beach Boys
- January 2, Gregg Allman, opening act was the Devon Allman Band

2013

- October 18, Chicago
- April 29, The Smashing Pumpkins
- March 30, Yes

2012

- August 30, Creed

2011

- October 7, The Steve Miller Band
- May 13, Kris Kristofferson and John Prine
- March 20, Crystal Gayle, Larry Gatlin and Andy Cooney (American Voices tour)

2010

- November 19, Diana Ross
- November 17, Fiddler on the Roof
- April 30, ZZ Top
- April 2, Jerry Seinfeld
- March 20, Foreigner
- February 4, Buddy Guy and B.B. King
- January 23, South Pacific

2007

- December 29, ZZ Top, opening act was Blackberry Smoke
- November 7, Morrissey
- April 6, Tom Jones

2006

- July 15, Spyro Gyra
- July 9, Ringo Starr & His All-Starr Band
- March 25, The Sleeping Beauty
- March 10, James Taylor
- February 2, Soweto Gospel Choir
- January 29, Earl Klugh
- January 27, Vince Gill
- January 15, Linda Ronstadt

2005

- November 2, Billy Idol
- October 20, Trisha Yearwood, opening act was Jessi Alexander
- September 28, Loggins and Messina (Sittin' In Again tour)
- April 15, Ravi Shankar with Anoushka Shankar and Tanmoy Bose
- April 13, Joe Jackson and Todd Rundgren, opening act was Ethel
- April 8, Mannheim Steamroller
- March 3, Patti LaBelle

2003

- November 16, Peter Cetera
- October 26, Wynonna, opening act was Blue Country
- October 19, Boz Scaggs
- October 10, Peter Frampton, opening act was Joe Bonamassa
- January 7, Huey Lewis and the News

2002

- December 18, The Oak Ridge Boys
- November 24, The Irish Tenors
- October 26, Wynonna
- October 20, Michael Bolton
- October 3, Lee Ann Womack, opening act was Elizabeth Cook
- May 10, Jethro Tull
- March 20, Engelbert Humperdinck
- March 10, Natalie Merchant
- March 15, KC and the Sunshine Band and Village People
- February 22, Sérgio Mendes and Dionne Warwick
- January 4, Hall & Oates (postponed from 13 September 2001)

2001

- November 23, Anne Murray with full symphony orchestra
- September 9, Olivia Newton-John
- April 24, Bruce Hornsby
- March 21, The Irish Rovers
- February 11, Smokey Robinson
- January 14, Kenny Rogers, opening act was Linda Davis

2000

- October 29, Julio Iglesias
- October 26, Natalie Cole
- June 2, Wynonna, opening act was Michael Johnson
- February 18, Stomp
- January 23, Tony Orlando with Johnny Petillo

1999

- November 21, Chicago
- November 20, Ray Charles
- November 8, The Righteous Brothers
- November 5, Alabama
- July 16, Ann and Nancy Wilson (acoustic)
- March 16, Kodo

1998

- October 23, Willie Nelson and Family, opening act was Bob Rafkin
- October 22, Peter, Paul and Mary
- March 20, The Scots Guards and The Black Watch
- March 13, Guitar Summit III: Herb Ellis, Sharon Isbin, Rory Block and Stanley Jordan
- February 13, Wayne Newton
- February 12, Bobby Vinton
- February 3, B.B. King
- February 1, Pat Metheny Group
- January 11, George Winston
- January 2, James Brown with backup singers The Bitter Sweets

1997

- December 27, The Manhattan Transfer
- November 28, Colors of Christmas: Sheena Easton, Peabo Bryson, James Ingram, Patti Austin
- November 13, Dr. John and his Band joined by Charlie Musselwhite and Keb' Mo' for a few songs
- October 23, Dion and Little Richard
- October 19, Al Di Meola and The Rippingtons with Russ Freeman
- August 10, Boz Scaggs, opening act was Delgado
- February 22, Tibetan Monks
- February 16, Paul Anka, opening act was comedian Stewie Stone

1996

- November 23, Jessi Colter and Waylon Jennings, opening act was comedian Dan Riley
- November 15, Art Porter, Jr. and George Benson
- October 26, America and Air Supply
- October 24, The Four Tops
- April 4, Grease with Sally Struthers and Mackenzie Phillips
- March 23, Gordon Lightfoot
- February 8, Blood, Sweat & Tears

1988

- April 10, Singin' in the Rain (venue premiere performance)
