= Pickin' & Fiddlin' =

Studio album by The Dillards, Byron Berline
- Released: 1965
- Studio: World Pacific Studios, Los Angeles
- Genre: Bluegrass
- Length: 33:00 (approximate)
- Label: Elektra
- Producer: Jim Dickson

The Dillards chronology
Live!!!! Almost!!! (1964)	Pickin' & Fiddlin' (1965)	Wheatstraw Suite (1968)

Pickin' & Fiddlin' is the third album by American band the Dillards, recorded with up and coming fiddle player Byron Berline. The album is entirely instrumental, with no vocals. The group had been unhappy with Elektra because they felt pressure from the company not to innovate, as they were beginning to do (and would eventually record on Wheatstraw Suite), and because they felt that Elektra was not doing enough to promote their records. The Dillards chose to record a strictly traditional album with Berline, a friend of the group, because they owed Elektra one more album. Rodney later stated, "That wasn't a record made for anyone but the traditionals. We got completely hacked to pieces by them. So we said, 'Okay, screw you guys, we'll make an album, and we'll play it right up your ass!,' so we did."

== Track listing ==
1. "Hamilton County"
2. "Fisher's Hornpipe"
3. "Paddy on the Turnpike" (Traditional)
4. "Jazzbow Rag"
5. "Apple Blossom" (John Lusk)
6. "Tom & Jerry"
7. "Cotton Patch"
8. "Durang's Hornpipe"
9. "Wagoner"
10. "Sally Johnson"
11. "Crazy Creek" (Tommy Jackson)
12. "Drunken Billy Goat"
13. "Black Mountain Rag" (Leslie Keith)
14. "Twinkle, Twinkle"
15. "Wild John"
16. "Soppin' the Gravy"

== Personnel ==
The Dillards with Byron Berline

- Byron Berline - fiddle
- Rodney Dillard - guitar
- Douglas Dillard - banjo
- Mitchell Jayne - bass
- Dean Webb - mandolin

Technical

- William S. Harvey - cover design
- Jim Dickson - cover photography
