= Walkin' Down the Line =

Song by Bob Dylan

from the album The Bootleg Series Volumes 1–3 (Rare & Unreleased) 1961–1991
- Released: March 26, 1991
- Recorded: March 1963
- Length: 2:52
- Label: Columbia
- Songwriter: Bob Dylan

"Walkin' Down the Line" is a song written by Bob Dylan and first recorded by him in November 1962 for Broadside magazine. Dylan recorded the song again in March 1963 for his music publisher Witmark and this version was released in 1991 on The Bootleg Series Volumes 1–3 (Rare & Unreleased) 1961–1991.

The lyrics recount the troubles of a hobo walking down the railroad tracks.

It was sung by Arlo Guthrie at Woodstock and his performance appears on the 1994 Woodstock 25th anniversary box set.

== Covers ==
- 1963 – Jackie DeShannon on her debut album, Jackie DeShannon
- 1964 – Hamilton Camp on his album Paths of Victory
- 1964 – Glen Campbell on his album The Astounding 12-String Guitar of Glen Campbell
- 1964 – The Dillards on their album Live!!!! Almost!!!
- 1964 – The Goldebriars on their album Straight Ahead!
- 1965 – Joe & Eddie on their album Walkin' Down the Line
- 1965 – The Gene Norman Group on its album Dylan Jazz
- 1965 – Odetta on her album Odetta Sings Dylan
- 1967 – Rick Nelson on his album Country Fever
- 1968 – Joan Baez on her album of Dylan covers Any Day Now
- 1969 – Glenn Yarbrough on his album Yarbrough Country
- 1971 – Oliver on his album Prism
- 1972 – Guy Carawan on his album The Telling Takes Me Home
- 1972 – The Country Gentlemen on their album The Award Winning Country Gentlemen
- 1975 – Arlo Guthrie and Pete Seeger on the album Together in Concert
- 1979 – Guy Carawan, Hannes Wader, Werner Lämmerhirt e.a. on Folk Friends
- 1992 – Rising Sons on their album Rising Sons Featuring Taj Mahal and Ry Cooder (recorded in the mid-1960s)
- 1997 – Rick Robbins on his album Walkin' Down The Line
- 2003 – Sean Hayes on his album Alabama Chicken
- 2004 – The Flatlanders on their album Live '72 (recorded in 1972)
- 2007 – Eilen Jewell on Letters From Sinners & Strangers
- 2011 – Robin and Linda Williams on the Dylan tribute album A Nod to Bob 2
