= 12 String Guitar! =

Studio album by The Folkswingers
- Released: 1963
- Recorded: 24, 25, 27 May 1963
- Studio: World Pacific Studio, Los Angeles, California
- Genre: Folk
- Label: World Pacific
- Producer: Jim Dickson

The Folkswingers chronology
12 String Guitar! (1963)	12 String Guitar! Vol. 2 (1963)

12 String Guitar! is an instrumental folk album released by the Folkswingers in 1963. The Folkswingers were a studio band with constantly changing personnel. On this album, they consist of Glen Campbell on 12-string guitar and the Dillards.

== Track listing ==
Side One
No.	Title	Writer(s)	Length
1.	"If I Had a Hammer"	Lee Hays, Pete Seeger	2:43
2.	"Black Mountain Rag"	Traditional	2:23
3.	"Walk Right In"	Gus Cannon, Hosea Woods	1:54
4.	"Wildwood Flower"	A.P. Carter	2:12
5.	"Blowin' in the Wind"	Bob Dylan
6.	"Midnight Special"	Jim Scott	2:10

Side Two
No.	Title	Writer(s)	Length
1.	"Cottonfields"	Traditional	2:26
2.	"Columbus Stockade Blues"	Jimmie Davis, Eva Sargent	2:21
3.	"Rye Whiskey"	Wils Carter	2:18
4.	"Bull Durham"	Glen Campbell	1:53
5.	"Wabash Cannonball"	John E. Graham	2:09
6.	"Dark as a Dungeon"	Merle Travis	2:57
7.	"This Train"	Traditional	2:25

== Critical reception ==
Professional ratings
Review scores
Source	Rating
AllMusic	3/5 stars

== Personnel ==
- Doug Dillard – banjo
- Rodney Dillard – guitar
- Dean Webb – bass
- Glen Campbell – 12-string guitar

== Production ==
- Producer – Jim Dickson

== Charts ==
Chart	Entry date	Peak position	No. of weeks
Billboard 200	1963	132	?
