= Herb Pedersen =

American musician, guitarist, banjo player, and songwriter

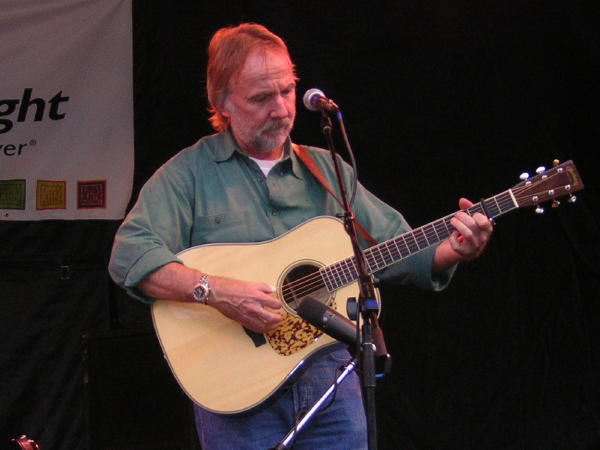
- Pedersen performing in 2004

Background information
- Born: Herbert Joseph Pedersen; April 27, 1944 (age 82); Berkeley, California, U.S.
- Genres: Country, Bluegrass, Progressive bluegrass, Folk, Folk rock, Country rock
- Occupations: Musician, guitarist, singer, songwriter
- Instruments: Guitar, banjo, vocals
- Years active: 1961–present
- Labels: Sugar Hill, Epic, Reprise, Elektra, Atlantic, Rhino, Sony, Curb, MCA, Back Porch, Acoustic Disc.
- Website: www.herbpedersen.com

Herbert Joseph Pedersen (born April 27, 1944) is an American musician, guitarist, banjo player, and singer-songwriter who has played a variety of musical styles over the past fifty years including country, bluegrass, progressive bluegrass, folk, folk rock, country rock, and has worked with numerous musicians in many different bands.

== Biography ==
Pedersen often performs with Chris Hillman, and both were once members of the Desert Rose Band. Pedersen also fronted his own band called the Laurel Canyon Ramblers which included bluegrass bassman Bill Bryson, writer and performer of the Crossroads Cafe song penned while a member of the Bluegrass Cardinals. Other musicians and groups with whom Pedersen has worked include John Fogerty; Mudcrutch; Pine Valley Boys; Michael Martin Murphey; Earl Scruggs; The Dillards, Smokey Grass Boys; The New Kentucky Colonels; Old & In the Way; David Grisman; Peter Rowan; Vassar Clements; Gram Parsons; Emmylou Harris; Skip Battin, Tony Rice; Dan Fogelberg; Stephen Stills; Linda Ronstadt; Kris Kristofferson; John Prine; Jackson Browne; Clarence White; John Denver; John Jorgenson; Leland Sklar; David Bromberg, The Doobie Brothers, Vince Gill; John Denver; and Rice, Rice, Hillman & Pedersen; and Vern and Ray.

== Discography ==
=== as Leader ===
- Southwest (1976) Epic PE 34225
- Sandman (1977) Epic PE 34933
- Lonesome Feeling (1984) Sugar Hill Records SH-3738

=== as Band member ===
- San Francisco 1968, Vern & Ray With Herb Pedersen (2006) Arhoolie Records CD 524
- Wheatstraw Suite, The Dillards (1968), Elektra EKS-74035
- Copperfields, The Dillards (1970), Elektra EKL-74054
- Live in Holland 1973, the New Kentucky Colonels (2013) Roland White Music – RW0001
- Here Today, David Grisman, Herb Pedersen, Vince Gill, Jim Buchanan, Emory Gordy Jr. (1982) Rounder Records – 0169
- The Desert Rose Band, The Desert Rose Band, with Chris Hillman & John Jorgenson (1987) MCA Records MCA-5991
- Running, The Desert Rose Band, with Chris Hillman & John Jorgenson (1988) MCA Records MCA-42169
- Pages Of Life, The Desert Rose Band, with Chris Hillman & John Jorgenson (1990) MCA Records MCA-42332
- True Love, The Desert Rose Band, with Chris Hillman & John Jorgenson (1991) MCA Records MCAD-10407
- Bluegrass Reunion, with Red Allen, David Grisman...(1992) Acoustic Disc ACD-4
- Rambler's Blues, Laurel Canyon Ramblers (1995) Sugar Hill Records SHCD-3834
- Rambler's Blues 2, Laurel Canyon Ramblers (1996) Sugar Hill Records SHCD-3852
- Bakersfield Bound, With Chris Hillman (1996) Sugar Hill Records – SHCD-3850
- Out of the Woodwork, with Tony Rice, Larry Rice, Chris Hillman (1997) Rounder Records CD0390
- Back On The Street Again, Laurel Canyon Ramblers (1998) Sugar Hill Records SHCD-3881
- Rice, Rice, Hillman & Pedersen, With Tony Rice, Larry Rice, Chris Hillman (1999) Rounder Records 11661-0450-2
- Running Wild, Rice, Rice, Hillman & Pedersen, (2001) Rounder Records 11661-0483-2
- Way Out West, with Chris Hillman (2002) Back Porch Records – 72438-11978-2-0
- At Edwards Barn, with Chris Hillman (2010) Rounder Records 11661-0652-2

=== Collaborations ===
- Linda Ronstadt (eponymous album) - Linda Ronstadt (1971)
- Don't Cry Now - Linda Ronstadt (1973)
- Grievous Angel - Gram Parsons (1974)
- Fall into Spring - Rita Coolidge (1974)
- Heart Like a Wheel - Linda Ronstadt (1974)
- Pieces of the Sky - Emmylou Harris (1975)
- Elite Hotel - Emmylou Harris (1975)
- Prisoner in Disguise - Linda Ronstadt (1975)
- Dane Donohue - Dane Donohue (1978)
- Mudcrutch 2 - Mudcrutch with Tom Petty (2016)
- Back To When - David Kraai (2026)
