= Rachel Brown (singer) =

American musician, singer and songwriter

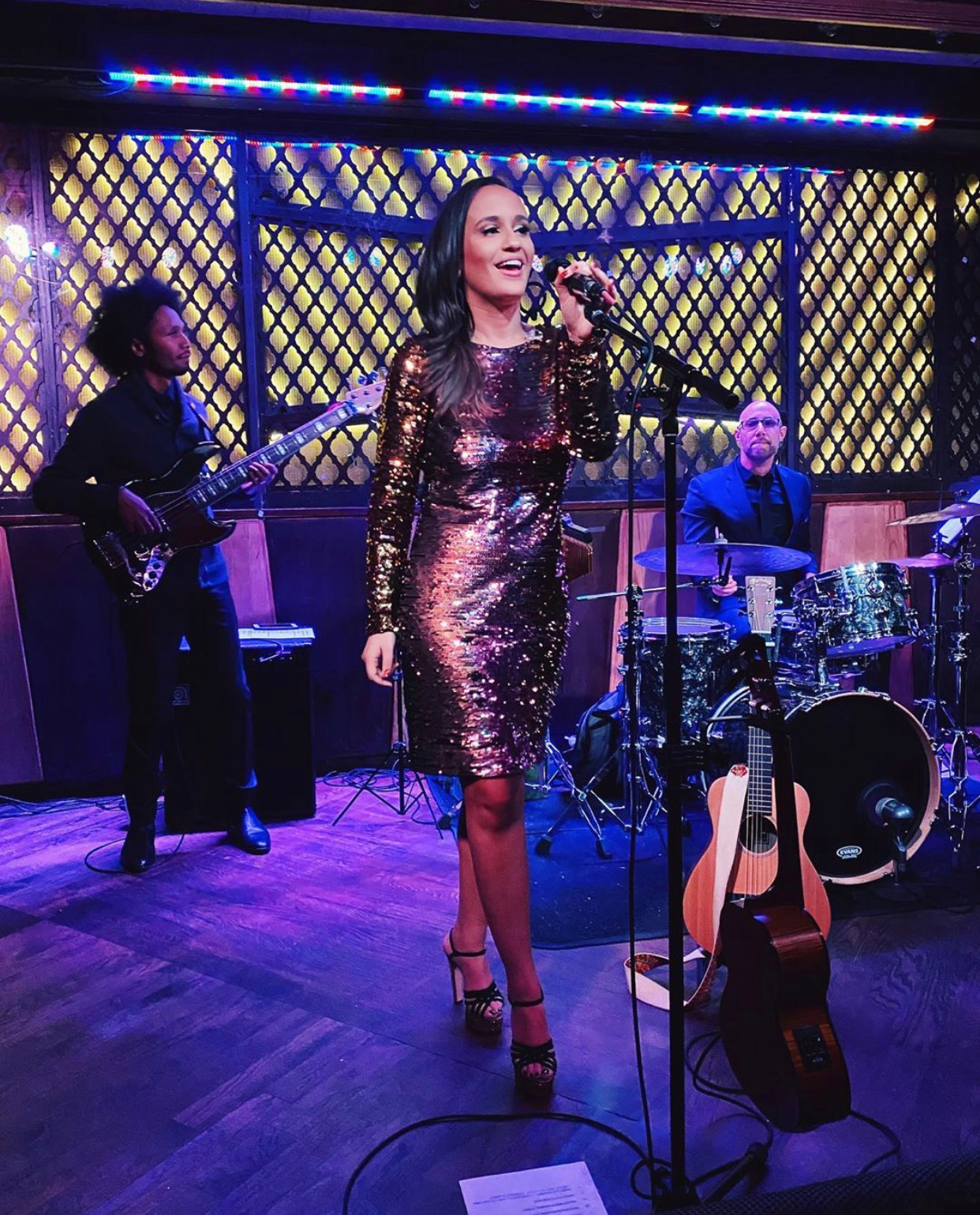
- Ginny's Harlem 2019

Background information
- Genres: Pop, Soul
- Occupations: Musician, songwriter
- Years active: 2012–present
- Website: www.rachelbrownmusic.com

Rachel Brown is an American musician, singer and songwriter best known for her song "Bumblebee".

== Early life ==
Rachel Brown was born and raised in New York City. She is the daughter of Ethiopian born mother Amsale Aberra who was an famous American fashion designer and executive Neil Brown, a New Jersey native with Bermudian and South Carolinian roots. After graduating from Hunter College High School in New York, Brown purchased a guitar and taught herself to play and write songs.

Brown attended Harvard College, developing her passion for music in her spare time, graduated cum laude, and was selected as one of Harvard's “15 Most Interesting Seniors” by The Harvard Crimson.

== Career ==
In 2009 while visiting family in Bermuda, Brown found herself at an open mic night called Chewstick. That night lead to her return to Bermuda later that year to perform at their annual musical Beachfest, which in turn led to her performing later that summer at the Bermuda National Stadium opening for Robin Thicke and Mary J. Blige and at the Bermuda Music Festival opening for John Legend and Quincy Jones. In 2010, Brown was the recipient of the American Society of Composers, Authors and Publishers Foundation Robert Allen Award selected by ASCAP membership staff. The following year Brown was a recipient of the Songwriter's Hall of Fame Abe Olman Award for Excellence in Songwriting.

Later in 2011, Perez Hilton selected Brown's cover of David Guetta’s “Without You” as the winner of his “Can You Sing?” competition.

In 2012 Rachel Brown released her debut EP Building Castles. Glamour.com wrote, “Her sensually soulful vocals carry the EP's captivating mélange of sounds – from Caribbean to hip-hop and world fusion – with uncanny ease, while conveying joy.” Building Castles includes the single, “Bumblebee,” which was featured in a Robbins Brothers commercial and by Jay Leno in his opening monologue on the Tonight Show.

In 2013 Brown was asked to contribute to Lennon Bermuda, a tribute album, book and concert inspired by John Lennon’s visit to Bermuda. The album includes Brown's cover of “Watching the Wheels” alongside contributions by Yoko Ono and Maxi Priest. Fusing pop, soul, Caribbean, world and hip-hop, Rachel's unique style of music has garnered the attention of stars such as Beyoncé, Leonardo DiCaprio, Jaden Smith, and more.

In 2015, Brown released The Band EP, recorded live at the Bunker Studio in Brooklyn, NY. The Band received praise from Vanity Fair, The New Yorker, InStyle, BlackBook, OkayPlayer, WWD, BBC, and more, and features the single “You Got Me,” which was accompanied by a music video starring Brown and a capuchin monkey, and a stripped-down acoustic guitar rendition of Whitney Houston's “I Wanna Dance with Somebody.”

Brown has opened for several artists, including John Legend, and Quincy Jones. and has often performed live with Wyclef Jean,

== Discography ==
- Building Castles EP (2012)
- Me & You (2014)
- The Band EP (2015)

=== Other Contributions ===
- Summer of Love EP (2013)
- Lennon Bermuda (2013)
