= Copperfields =

Studio album by The Dillards
- Released: 1970
- Genre: Rock; country; folk; bluegrass
- Length: 32:37
- Label: Elektra
- Producer: John Boylan

The Dillards chronology
Wheatstraw Suite (1968)	Copperfields (1970)	Roots and Branches (1972)

Professional ratings
Review scores
Source	Rating
Rolling Stone	(Mixed)

Copperfields is the fifth album by American band the Dillards. Further distancing themselves from traditional bluegrass music, the album draws from bluegrass, rock, folk and country music, with prominent orchestra and increased use of drums (played by Paul York), electric bass guitar and electric guitar on "Brother John". Herb Pedersen, who replaced Doug Dillard starting with Wheatstraw Suite, assumes a more prominent role on this album, writing more songs, contributing more vocals and appearing more prominently on the album cover.

== Track listing ==
1. "Rainmaker" (Bill Martin, Harry Nilsson)
2. "In Our Time" (Rodney Dillard, Mitch Jayne)
3. "Old Man at the Mill" (Doug Dillard, Rodney Dillard, Mitch Jayne, Herb Pedersen, Dean Webb)
4. "Touch Her If You Can" (Rodney Dillard, Mitch Jayne)
5. "Woman Turn Around" (Rodney Dillard, Mitch Jayne)
6. "Yesterday" (Lennon–McCartney)
7. "Brother John" (Herb Pedersen)
8. "Copperfields" (Herb Pedersen)
9. "West Montana Hannah" (Mitch Jayne, Herb Pedersen)
10. "Close the Door Lightly" (Eric Andersen)
11. "Pictures" (Rodney Dillard)
12. "Ebo Walker" (Rodney Dillard, Mitch Jayne) (featuring Byron Berline on fiddle), (named for the friend of the group and future member of New Grass Revival, though despite the lyrics, he was not, in fact, dead)
13. "Sundown" (Herb Pedersen)
