= The Astounding 12-String Guitar of Glen Campbell =

Studio album by Glen Campbell
- Released: March 1964
- Studio: Capitol (Hollywood)
- Genre: Folk
- Length: 27:57
- Label: Capitol
- Producer: Kermit Walter, Nick Venet

Glen Campbell chronology
Too Late to Worry – Too Blue to Cry (1963)	The Astounding 12-String Guitar of Glen Campbell (1964)	The Big Bad Rock Guitar of Glen Campbell (1965)

Professional ratings
Review scores
Source	Rating
AllMusic	2.5/5 stars

The Astounding 12-String Guitar of Glen Campbell is the third studio album by American singer-guitarist Glen Campbell, recorded in stereo and released in 1964 by Capitol Records. The album is instrumental, with the exception of one cut: "Walkin' Down the Line", on which Campbell also sings.

== Track listing ==
Side 1

1. "Lonesome Twelve" (Roy Clark) – 2:30
2. "Puff the Magic Dragon" (Peter Yarrow, Leonard Lipton) – 2:25
3. "The Ballad of Jed Clampett" (Paul Henning) – 1:53
4. "Blowin' in the Wind" (Bob Dylan) – 2:26
5. "500 Miles (Away From Home)" (Hedy West) – 2:20
6. "Walkin' Down the Line" (Bob Dylan) – 2:05

Side 2

1. "12-String Special" (Glen Campbell) – 1:53
2. "Green Green" (Barry McGuire, Randy Sparks) – 2:01
3. "Wimoweh" (arranged and adapted by Paul Campbell) – 2:30
4. "Bull Durham" (Glen Campbell) – 2:08
5. "La-Bamba" (adapted by Glen Campbell) – 2:12
6. "This Land Is Your Land" (Woody Guthrie) – 2:15

== Personnel ==
Music

- Glen Campbell – vocals, twelve-string guitar
- Chip Douglas – bass guitar
- Carl Tandberg – bass guitar
- Hal Blaine – drums
- Donny Cotton – drums
- Earl Palmer – drums
- Roy Clark – banjo

Production

- Kermit Walter – producer
- Nick Venet – producer
- George Jerman/Capitol Photo Studio – photography
