= Lennon Bermuda =

Tribute album and book

- Author: Scott Neil
- Illustrator: Graham Foster
- Language: English
- Genre: Music, biography
- Published: 2013

Lennon Bermuda

Studio album by various artists
- Released: 2013
- Genre: Rock

Lennon Bermuda is a tribute album and book inspired by John Lennon’s visit to Bermuda in 1980, where he wrote a portion of his Double Fantasy album. The Lennon Bermuda boxed set comprises two discs by various artists with a connection to Bermuda, including Yoko Ono, covering Lennon songs. There is also a book by author Scott Neil, illustrated by artist Graham Foster, describing Lennon’s stay on the island.

Bermudian Andy Newmark, who played drums on Double Fantasy, features on many of the tracks on Lennon Bermuda by artists including Paul Carrack, Bryan Ferry, Nils Lofgren, Rocky and the Natives and several others.

The international release date for Lennon Bermuda was April 29, 2013, and the US release date September 24, 2013.

The executive producers were Michael Freisenbruch and Tony Brannon.

== Track listing ==
All songs written by John Lennon, except where noted.

Disc 1

1. Yoko Ono – "Walking on Thin Ice" (Ono)
2. Bryan Ferry – "Jealous Guy"
3. Judie Tzuke – "Love"
4. Paul Carrack – "Girl" (Lennon–McCartney)
5. Maxi Priest – "All My Loving" (Lennon–McCartney)
6. Nils Lofgren & Andy Newmark – "Any Time at All" (Lennon–McCartney)
7. Bailey & Tallula Tzuke – "Oh My Love"
8. Christina Frith – "Julia" (Lennon–McCartney)
9. Errol Reid – "Borrowed Time"
10. John 'Rhino' Edwards – "Come Together" (Lennon–McCartney)
11. Heather Nova – "Norwegian Wood" (Lennon–McCartney)
12. Rachel Brown – "Watching the Wheels"
13. Biggie Irie – "Woman"
14. Mia Chambray – "Don't Let Me Down" (Lennon–McCartney)
15. Baily Outerbridge – "Revolution" (Lennon–McCartney)
16. Paper Cutouts – "Working Class Hero"
17. Jonathan Frith – "Beautiful Boy"
18. K Gabriella – "I'm Losing You"
19. Uzimon – "New York City"
20. Wayne Furbert, Robert "Sai" Emery, Will Black, Francesca Dill, Ed Christopher, Ronnie Lopes, Dennis Moniz, Gita Blakeney, Paul Harney, TraceyLynn Harney, Adam Melvin – "All You Need Is Love" (Lennon–McCartney)

Disc 2

1. Phil Morrison – "Lucy in the Sky with Diamonds" (Lennon–McCartney)
2. Horrendous Mendez – "Gimme Some Truth"
3. Roy Young – "Nowhere Man" (Lennon–McCartney)
4. Joy T Barnum – "Mind Games"
5. McCartney K – "Grow Old with Me"
6. Steve Easton – "Bless You"
7. Chewstick – "Power to the People"
8. Rebecca Faulkenberry & Nic Christopher – "Real Love"
9. Rocky & the Natives – "Tight A$"
10. Michael Cacy – "Crippled Inside"
11. Soda – "God"
12. Victor Chambray – "Across the Universe" (Lennon–McCartney)
13. Robert "Sai" Emery – "Imagine"
14. Two Guitars – "Happy Xmas / War is Over"
