= Luke "Long Gone" Miles =

American blues singer-songwriter

- Born: Luke Miles; May 8, 1925; Lachute, Louisiana, United States
- Died: November 22, 1987 (aged 62) Los Angeles, California, United States
- Genres: Texas blues, electric blues
- Occupations: Singer, songwriter
- Instrument: Vocals
- Years active: 1952–1980s

Luke "Long Gone" Miles (May 8, 1925 – November 22, 1987) was an American Texas blues and electric blues singer and songwriter. He was a protégé of Lightnin' Hopkins and variously recorded or performed with Hopkins, Sonny Terry, Brownie McGhee and Willie Chambers. Miles is best known for his 1964 album Country Born, issued by World Pacific Records.

== Life and career ==
Miles was born in Lachute, Louisiana. Except for a period of service in the United States Navy in 1943 and 1944, he worked on a cotton plantation until the early 1950s and listened to blues music on the radio. Suitably inspired, Miles moved to Houston, Texas, in 1952, with the single aim of meeting Lightnin' Hopkins. Miles stated, "I went to Houston for one reason. I went to see Lightnin’ Hopkins. That's what I went for and that's what I did. Lightnin' Hopkins taught me just about everything about blues singing. The first time I ever sang in front of an audience was in 1952 with Lightnin'. The first day I met Lightnin' he named me "Long Gone" … and I've been Long Gone Miles ever since".

According to Ed Pearl, "Miles appeared on Lightnin's doorstep in Houston a long while back, and Lightnin' wanted to close the door. And Luke proceeded to just go to sleep on his doorstep.... he was a real country guy. So Lightnin' took a fancy to him and let him hang around and he was a good singer, and Lightnin' sometimes let him perform with him on stage".

Nervous at his first concert, Miles dropped the microphone. However, he persevered and played at local clubs, and he subsequently appeared on several of Hopkins's recordings, including the "live album", Country Blues (1960). In 1961, Miles relocated to Los Angeles, but, with Hopkins being "rediscovered" and his career booming, the two parted ways.

In 1962, Miles recorded two singles for Smash Records, accompanied by Brownie McGhee and Sonny Terry. The B-side to both singles was the antiwar song "War Time Blues", in which Miles sang, "Well, when I get my examination card, I want the doctor tell me I too doggone old". Also in 1962, he teamed up with the guitarist Willie Chambers, and they performed together regularly for two years. In 1964, Miles recorded the album Country Born, released by World Pacific. In addition, he recorded singles for Two Kings Records in 1965 and, four years later, another one, "Hello Josephine", for Kent. A live recording of Miles was made in 1966 at the Ash Grove nightclub, in Los Angeles, where he was accompanied on acoustic guitar by Bernie Pearl, the brother of the Ash Grove proprietor, Ed Pearl.

However, in 1970, Miles lived up to his stage name and disappeared for a long time from performing and recording. He never spoke to or heard from Hopkins again. The later album releases were Country Boy (1984), which included mainly previously unreleased tracks recorded in 1962, and Riding Around in My V8 Ford (2008), composed of tracks recorded live in Venice, California, in 1985.

Miles died on November 22, 1987, in Los Angeles, aged 62.

== Discography ==
=== Albums ===
Year	Title	Record label
1964	Country Born	World Pacific
1984	Country Boy	Sundown
2008	Riding Around in My V8 Ford	Conjure Root

=== Singles ===
Year	A-side	B-side	Record label
1962	"Let Me Play with Your Poodle"	"War Time Blues"	Smash
1962	"Long Gone"	"War Time Blues"	Smash
1964	"Long Gone"	"No Money, No Honey"	World Pacific
1965	"38 Pistol"	"Lena Mae"	Two Kings
1965	"Early One Morning"	"Losing My Mind"	Two Kings
1969	"Hello Josephine"	"Little Sweet Thing"	Kent

== See also ==
- List of Texas blues musicians
- List of electric blues musicians
