= Amsale Aberra =

Ethiopian-American fashion designer

- Born: 1 March 1954; Addis Ababa, Ethiopia
- Died: 1 April 2018 (aged 64); New York City, U.S.
- Occupation: Fashion designer
- Known for: Wedding gowns

Amsale Aberra (1 March 1954 – 1 April 2018) was an Ethiopian American fashion designer and entrepreneur. Her main field of design was in couture wedding gowns, and her flagship store is located in SOHO in New York City. She was a member of the Council of Fashion Designers of America (CFDA) and a Trustee of the Fashion Institute of Technology.

Amsale Aberra was professionally known as Amsale (pronounced Ahm-sah'-leh).

== Biography ==
Born in Addis Ababa, Ethiopia to Tsadale Assamnew, a housewife and was raised by stepfather Aberra Moltot, Ethiopia's vice-minister for National Community Development. Amsale met her biological father only once.

Aberra moved to Poultney, Vermont, to study commercial art at Green Mountain College when she was 19. Political upheaval in her native Ethiopia forced Amsale to stay in the United States and support herself through her undergraduate years. As financial resources were limited, Amsale began to design and sew her own clothing. For the first time, Amsale considered the possibility of a career in fashion design. Aberra says that she herself never expected to be a professional fashion designer.

After earning her degree in political science from Boston State College, Amsale left Boston and enrolled in New York's Fashion Institute of Technology (FIT), where she earned an associate degree in Fashion Design.

After completing her studies at FIT, Aberra went to work as a design assistant for Harvé Benard. After she worked there for two years, she began her own bridal gown company. Her approach was to create stunning, simple gowns that would fit the modern woman. Her design philosophy was to take a "forever" modern approach to sophisticated design. Not only that, but her designs are seen as modern but still keep in mind traditional designs, such as her use of "illusion" necklines.

In 1985, while planning her wedding, Aberra scoured the stores to find a simple, refined wedding dress. She found little in the way of clean, sophisticated gowns, and discovered an untapped niche in the bridal market. Aberra placed an advertisement for custom-made gowns and started her business out of her New York City loft apartment.

On the website Huffington Post, Aberra had an Ask Amsale blog, where brides and brides-to-be could post questions for her, or express their love of her gowns. Aberra expressed her love of finding the perfect gown for any bride. This was solidified by the space on her main website where real brides can submit photos of themselves on their wedding day in one of her creations.

While her designs began as only wedding gowns, Aberra expanded her line to include her regular Amsale line, Amsale Blue label (for more luxurious gowns), The Little White Dress, bridesmaid dresses, as well as cocktail dresses. Her gowns range in price from $3000 and $12000 in price. Additionally in 2003, Aberra created the Kenneth Pool label and began designing a line of dresses featuring dramatic ball gowns, luxurious fabrics and intricate beadwork. In 2005, Amsale acquired the 30-year-old Christos company. With her Christos gowns, Aberra sought to create a more romantic feeling dress – using French laces and silk organza. In 2006, she was the third bridal designer to open a store on Madison Ave. In 2012, Amsale was the winner of The Legacy Award at Black Enterprise Women of Power Summit.

== In popular culture ==
In 2007, ABC purchased an Aberra wedding dress for use in the season third finale of Grey's Anatomy. Also that year, Lincoln hired Aberra to produce a television commercial for their MKX model. In June 2011, WE tv aired Amsale Girls, a reality show taking viewers behind the scenes of Amsale's Madison Avenue flagship salon and the highly skilled bridal consultants who work to help each unique bride find her perfect dress. Along with the Grey's Anatomy gowns, Amsale's dresses have been featured on The Oprah Winfrey Show, and The View. American Wedding, 27 Dresses, When in Rome, and The Hangover all featured wedding dresses designed by Amsale. While her gowns have been featured on television as well as in films, celebrities have also been fans of Amsale gowns. Aberra dressed such notable women as Halle Berry, Julia Roberts, Selma Blair, Salma Hayek, Lucy Liu, Vivica A. Fox, Heather Graham, Lisa Kudrow, Katherine Heigl, Kim Basinger, Heidi Klum, and many others. She was twice included on Ebony magazine's "Power 150" list of the 150 most influential African Americans.

== Personal life and death ==
Aberra and her husband, film executive Neil Brown, lived in Manhattan. Aberra had a daughter, singer-songwriter Rachel Brown.

Aberra died of uterine cancer on 1 April 2018, aged 64.
