= Dean Webb (musician) =

- Born: Roy Dean Webb; March 28, 1937; Independence, Missouri, US
- Died: June 30, 2018 (aged 81)
- Genres: Bluegrass, rock
- Occupation: Musician
- Instrument: Mandolin
- Label: Flying Fish
- Formerly of: The Dillards, The Folkswingers, Missouri Boatride
- Spouse(s): Jennifer Clark, Erica

Dean Webb was a bluegrass and rock musician who was a member of The Dillards as well as other recording acts.

== Background ==
Dean Roy Webb was born in Independence, Missouri on March 28, 1937. He grew up in a musical family and as a teenager hearing Bill Monroe's version of Blue Moon of Kentucky had an impact on him. He fell in love with bluegrass music and he got a Gibson A-50 mandolin and then joined his cousins who played bluegrass.

Webb was a member of The Dillards, The Folkswingers, and along with Justin Sifford, Bob Gideon, Larry Sifford, and Dennis Pritchard, he was a member of the bluegrass musical ensemble, Missouri Boatride.

He had a part in the creation of The Byrds' "Tambourine Man. He did a vocal harmony on an early demo version of the song for the benefit of David Crosby.

Webb is considered to be a notable, and prominent figure in the bluegrass genre, and remembered for his playing skills.

== Career ==
Webb along with Mitch Jayne was an original founding of The Dillards in the early 1960s in Salem, Mo.

Webb played on and added backing vocals to Malvina Reynolds self-titled album that was released in 1970.

As a member of The Dillards, he was working on the band's Tribute to an American Duck album which was set to be released in October, 1973.

Webb played on Severin Browne's second album, New Improved that was released in 1974.

His band, The Missouri Boatride was booked to play at the State Theater, in Mound City on Saturday, September 7 and 7pm.

== Death ==
He died on Saturday, June 30, 2018, at age 81.

== Legacy ==
According to Bluegrass Today, Webb with his mandolin playing had an influence on John Paul Jones of Led Zeppelin fame and inspired him to play the mandolin. Referred to as a groundbreaking musician, his influence also extends to newgrass and country rock.
