= Dylan Jazz =

Studio album by The Gene Norman Group
- Released: 1965
- Recorded: 1965
- Genre: Jazz
- Length: 26:57
- Label: GNP Crescendo
- Producer: Leon Russell, Snuff Garrett

Professional ratings
Review scores
Source	Rating
Allmusic	2/5 stars

Dylan Jazz is a 1965 instrumental jazz album of Bob Dylan songs recorded under the band name The Gene Norman Group. Norman, while not a professional musician, was a jazz impresario and DJ who, in 1954, founded the GNP Crescendo Record Co.

== Track listing ==
All songs written by Bob Dylan

Side one

1. "Blowin' in the Wind" – 2:51
2. "Masters of War" – 3:01
3. "Mr. Tambourine Man" – 3:11
4. "Don't Think Twice, It's All Right" – 2:47
5. "Walkin' Down the Line" – 2:32

Side two

6. "All I Really Want to Do" – 2:23
7. "Like A Rolling Stone" – 2:38
8. "A Hard Rain's A Gonna Fall – 2:34
9. "Subterranean Homesick Blues" – 2:21
10. "It Ain't Me Babe" – 2:39

== Personnel ==
- Jim Horn - saxophone, flute
- Glen Campbell - guitar
- Al De Lory - piano
- Lyle Ritz - bass
- Hal Blaine - drums

== Production ==
- Producer - Leon Russell, Snuff Garrett
- Executive producer - Bud Dain
- Album design - Peter Whorf Graphics

== Release history ==
Region	Date	Label	Format	Catalog
United States	1965	GNP Crescendo	mono LP	GNP-2015
United States	1965	GNP Crescendo	stereo LP	GNPS-2015
worldwide	February 21, 2006	GNP Crescendo	download	
worldwide	January 23, 2009	CreateSpace	CD-R	

== See also ==
- List of songs written by Bob Dylan
- List of artists who have covered Bob Dylan songs
