= The Los Dos Bros =

- Origin: San Diego, California, United States
- Genres: Alternative country Americana; Post-rock-experimental
- Years active: 1992–2009
- Label: Adventure Pop Records
- Members: Louis Caverly; Derric Oliver
- Past members: Tommy Becker; Michael Taylor Hahn; Mehrdad Alaei; Takashi Saito; Clayton Payne; Jory Lyle; Steve Malone; Mark Reeves; Keith Dusko; Kevin Erikson; David Machlan; Greg Novak
- Website: Official website

The Los Dos Bros are an American rock band from San Diego, California and Big Sur, California.

== History ==
=== Early Years: 1992-1997 ===
In the spring of 1992, three musicians Tommy Becker, Louis Caverly, and Derric Oliver attending the University of the Pacific in Stockton, CA formed the band, Phacehead, drawing people toward a new, positive sound. They began exploring many of the musical and lyrical ideas that would later become the basis of their Adventure Pop sound.

Louis and Derric both grew up in San Diego enduring formal classical training while also absorbing a world of musical styles and genres from J.S. Bach to Rock Music. Despite having both grown up in the same town, they didn't meet until one fateful day hanging out in a garage on Rosemarie Lane (right off University of Pacific campus) playing music with members of the Archania house band. In 1993 they recorded their first studio demo (produced by George Frangadakis) of songs written by Tommy Becker.

In spring of 1994, after graduating from University of Pacific, the band relocated to San Francisco, California and started recording and playing out in clubs such as The Last Day Saloon on Clement Street, San Francisco

In 1996, the band produced a self-titled EP (at Found Sound in South San Francisco) and officially changed their name to The Formers. The session captured the interest of several San Francisco club promoters and received airplay on college radio station KEXP in Berkeley, California.

In the fall of 1997, the band decided that time off was necessary for them to individually refine their sound and rediscover sanity, or in some cases, insanity. This turned out to be a five-year break.

=== Rediscovered: 2002-2004 ===
In the summer of 2002, the original three members Tommy Becker, Louis Caverly and Derric Oliver reunited and resumed rehearsing and recording new material while assembling local musicians for live performances.

Louis Caverly had moved back from London, UK in early 2002. Derric Oliver had been working with Pro-Tools and was writing and recording under the name Holiday. Prior to 2002 they ran into each other a couple of times and would trade new recordings. Louis Caverly quotes, "we would literally run into each other in airports and Derric would hand me his latest demo as we were running to catch our respective flights, it was surreal. The demos sounded hot, I knew there was something there."

The band name again changed to Holiday and the Adventure Pop Collective, marrying the idea of the great Billie Holiday, taking a holiday, the Adventure Pop sound, and the influence of everyone that had left their mark on the band, respectively, the collective.

GOOD (album) Holiday and the Adventure Pop Collective, released early June 2003, was quickly followed by Start All Over again (EP), Wide Open (EP) and Potential is a Dangerous Thing (EP), all released before the end of 2003.

Early reviews were positive and the band started to get noticed after being reviewed by highly acclaimed American music critic Dave Marsh. He referred to their sound as "instantly memorable music with an ultimately unified sound."

=== Commercial releases: 2004–current ===
Become (album) Holiday and the Adventure Pop Collective was recorded October 2004 with Ben Moore at Big Fish studios in their home base of Encinitas, California. Striving for an organic, live sound, the album was recorded and mixed in 21 days on 24-track analog tape. The album included several local musicians including Dennis Caplinger (banjo and mandolin), Andy Powers (electric guitar), Billy Watson (harmonica), Brian Nucci (drums), and James East (bass). They also collaborated with photographer and graphic designer Kevin Bishop on a video for “Out On A Limb,” which is featured on the enhanced portion of the album. Become was distributed nationally by Sony BMG.

Allmusic rated the album four stars out of five saying "by the time you start to listen to "Her Daze" you wonder why these guys aren't on year-end lists. A gorgeous collection of tunes that would make groups like The Connells envious."

Steve Malone (pedal steel) who also recorded on "Become", joined the live line-up along with Jory Lyle (electric guitar), Takashi Saito (bass), and Michael Taylor Hahn on drums. They started touring relentlessly in June 2005. One-by-one the band dwindled to three, morphing the longest running, consistently solidified line-up featuring Derric Oliver singing and playing guitar and horns, Louis Caverly singing and playing fiddle and keys, and Michael Taylor Hahn playing the drums. They played more than 200 shows from 2005-2007 before Hahn departed the band late in 2007.

On March 6, 2008, Dallas, TX, day two of Holiday and the Adventure Pop Collective’s first U.S. tour (supporting Atlantic Records’ Louis XIV (band)), their new drummer went AWOL in the middle of the night, quitting the tour without a word or note of explanation. The trio quickly became a duo facing a choice: quit the tour and go home, or continue without a drummer. The decision to continue took about four seconds, and their second decision took about four more seconds. They officially changed their band name, once and for all, to The Los Dos Bros.

They released two new albums in 2008 (recording under the name Holiday and the Adventure Pop Collective but later re-manufactured the albums under the new name The Los Dos Bros), Songs for Feeling Strong (EP) The Los Dos Bros, and Greek Gods in the West (CD + DVD ‘Live from the Henry Miller Library, Big Sur, CA’) The Los Dos Bros. Both were recorded in June 2007 (with drummer, Michael Taylor Hahn) at Red Barn Studios in Big Sur, California, owned by Al Jardine of The Beach Boys.

== Discography ==
- GOOD (2003)
- Become (2005)
- Songs For Feeling Strong EP (2008)
- Greek Gods in the West CD & DVD (2008)
