= Country Born (Luke "Long Gone" Miles album) =

Studio album by Luke "Long Gone" Miles
- Released: April 1964
- Studio: World-Pacific Studios
- Label: World Pacific Records ST-1820
- Producer: James Dickson

Luke "Long Gone" Miles chronology
Country Born (1964)	Country Boy (1984)

Country Born is an album by blues singer Luke "Long Gone" Miles. It was released on the World Pacific Records label in 1964.

== Background ==
Country Born was recorded at World-Pacific Studios and produced by James Dickson. The LP was released in April 1964 on World Pacific WP 1820.

According to the album notes by Leslie Carter, upon their first meeting, Willie Chambers looked at Miles and thought that he was just a country boy who couldn't sing. Miles thought that Chambers wasn't much of a guitarist. But, over the two-year period to where the album became a reality, their regard for each other had grown considerably. The album's recording started on 5 February 1964. Bassist Leroy Vinnegar didn't know what to expect but ended up enjoying himself in the studio.

It was reported in the 29 February issue of Billboard that Luke "Long Gone" Miles, who had been performing in Houston with Lightnin' Hopkins for almost 10 years, and more recently in Californian clubs since moving there, had signed with the World Pacific label. His debut album would be released soon. It was also reported in Cash Box on that same issue date that Miles' album was one of three albums that were a result of three exclusive contracts to World Pacific. This was part of the label's expansion that included bluegrass and pop. The bluegrass release was by The Kentucky Colonels and the pop release was by The Standells, while Miles' release was put in the jazz category.

Joining Miles on the album was his regular guitarist Willy Chambers and veteran jazz bass player, Leroy Vinnegar.

The single from the album was "Long Gone" bw "No Money No Honey", released on World Pacific 408.

== Reception ==
It was reported in the 18 April 1964 issue of Cash Box that Miles would be performing and plugging his hit debut World Pacific album, Country Born on the Steve Allen Show the coming Wednesday night.

A Chart Pick, the album had a short review in the 2 May issue of Music Business where the reviewer called him a singer of rare persuasion who performed some of songs Muddy Waters, L.C. Williams, and Guitar Slim, plus his own originals touchingly.

The album was reviewed in the 17 December issue of Down Beat where it was given three stars. The reviewer began with a speculation of what Miles would sound like if Lightnin' Hopkins was not around, as Miles had adopted Hopkins' vocal quality, phrasing style, and performance mannerisms. Miles was said to bring it off in a way that was in a pleasant manner that was never offensive or overdone. The guitar style of Willie Chambers was Hopkins-like and completed the illusion with bassist Leroy Vinnegar rounding out the rhythm section.

In 1965 the album was reviewed by the California Folklore Quarterly with Willie Chambers' guitar accompaniment being called nice and the liner notes being informative.

It was also reviewed in the Journal of American Folklore in 1966.

According to the notes at Wolfgang's for Long Gone Miles and Bernie Pearl, Ash Grove (Los Angeles, CA), Country Born is a colorful mix of the swampy sounds from where Miles grew up in Louisiana, mixed with Lightnin' Hopkins' unique form of Texas flavored country blues.

== Album details ==
Country Born, World Pacific ST-1820
No.	Track	Composer	Time
A1	"I Feel All Right"	Long Gone Miles	1:35
A2	"Things That I Used to Do"	Guitar Slim	3:12
A3	"No Money No Honey"	Long Gone Miles	2:24
A4	"Miss Hazel Mae"	Long Gone Miles	3:44
A5	"Long Gone"	Long Gone Miles	3:32
B1	"Barefoot Rock"	Junior Parker	2:24
B2	"Bad Luck"	Long Gone Miles	3:22
B3	"Mercury Jump"	Traditional	1:52
B4	"Long Distance Call"	Muddy Waters	3:21
B5	"So Sorry for to Leave"	L. C. Williams	4:17

=== Musicians ===
- Long Gone Miles - vocals
- Willie Chambers - guitar
- Leroy Vinnegar - bass

=== Other details ===
- Recorded at World-Pacific Studios, Hollywood, California
- Produced by James Dickson
- Album design by Woody Woodward
- Cover photo by James Dickson
