= Mr. 12 String Guitar =

Studio album by Glen Campbell
- Released: 1966
- Recorded: 17, 18, August 20, 1965, World Pacific Studio and RCA Studio, Los Angeles, CA
- Genre: Folk
- Label: World Pacific
- Producer: Richard Bock

Mr. 12 String Guitar is an instrumental folk album featuring the 12 string guitar of American singer/guitarist Glen Campbell, released in 1966.

== Track listing ==
Side 1:

1. "All I Really Want To Do" (Bob Dylan) – 2:30
2. "It Ain't Me Babe" (Bob Dylan) – 2:35
3. "You've Got Your Troubles" (Roger Greenaway, Roger Cook) – 2:50
4. "Catch the Wind" (Donovan) – 2:20
5. "Mr. Tambourine Man" (Bob Dylan) – 2:14
6. "Subterranean Homesick Blues" (Bob Dylan) – 2:25

Side 2:

1. "Like a Rolling Stone" (Bob Dylan) – 2:55
2. "I Don't Believe You" (Bob Dylan) – 2:37
3. "Eve Of Destruction" (P.F. Sloan) – 2:29
4. "Blowin' in the Wind" (Bob Dylan) – 2:30
5. "Colours" (Donovan) – 2:04
6. "The 'In' Sound" (Glen Campbell) – 2:08

== Personnel ==
- Glen Campbell – 12 string guitar
- Bob Morris – acoustic guitar
- Jerry Cole – acoustic guitar, bass guitar
- Larry Knechtel – harmonica, organ
- Lyle Ritz – bass guitar
- Tommy Morgan – harmonica
- Donny Cotton – drums
- Richie Frost – drums

== Production ==
- Producer – Richard Bock
- Album design – Woody Woodward
