= Bob Rafkin =

American singer-songwriter

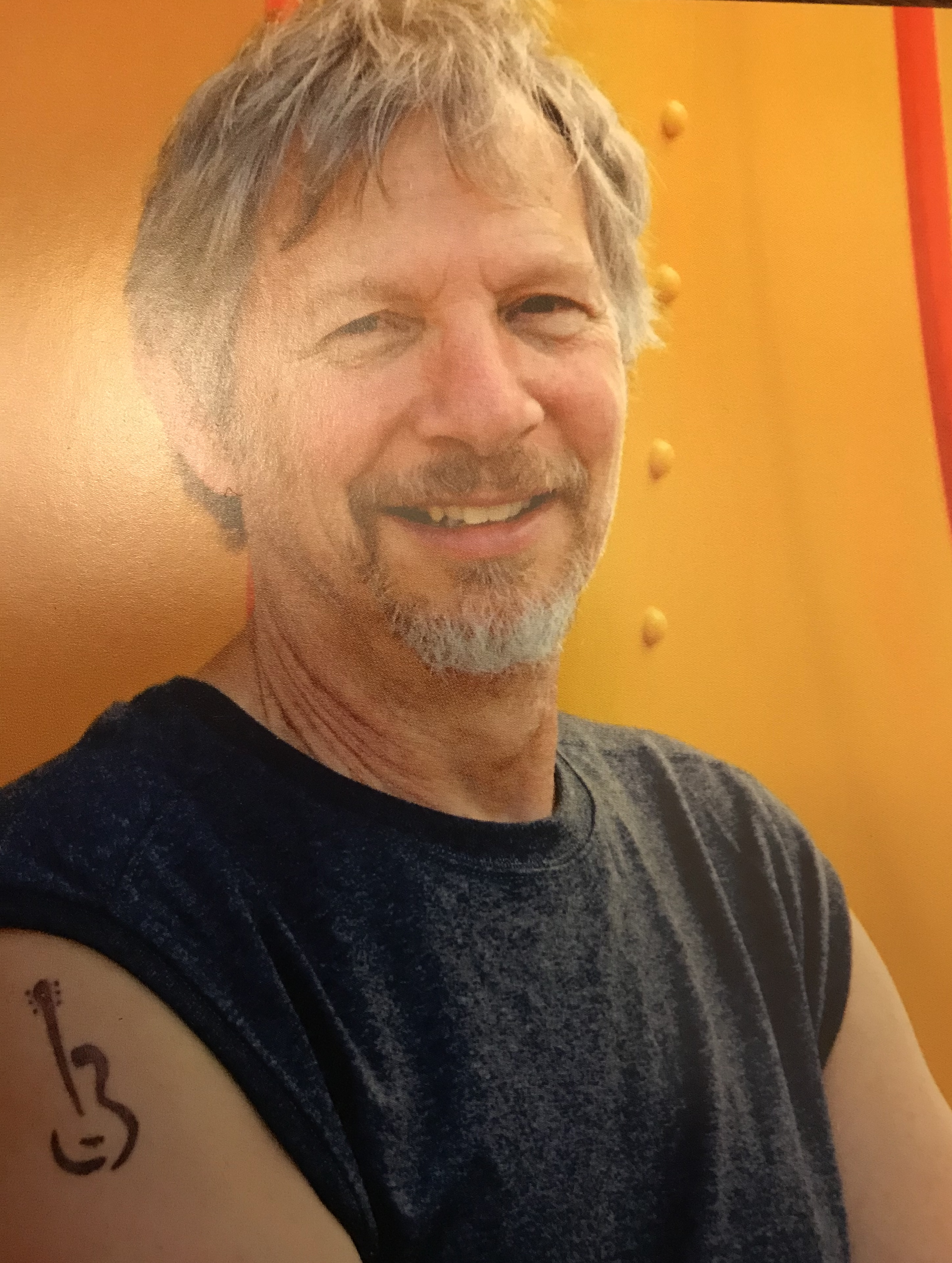
- Bob Rafkin 2011

Background information
- Also known as: Bob Rafkin
- Born: March 30, 1944
- Died: May 2, 2013 (aged 69)
- Occupation: Singer-songwriter

Bob Rafkin (30 March 1944 – 2 May 2013) was an American singer, songwriter and guitar player.

== Biography ==
Rafkin was born in New York City in 1944. His musical career really took off when he moved to Greenwich Village in the mid-sixties. Here he met David Blue and together they formed The American Patrol. During this period in the Village Rafkin also met Phil Ochs and Eric Andersen and he played on Andersen’s 1966 album More Hits from Tin Can Alley on Vanguard Records and later on Phil Ochs’ legendary album Gunfight at Carnegie Hall.

Rafkin knew Erik Jacobsen – the record producer for among others, the Lovin' Spoonful and Tim Hardin – and in 1967 when Jacobsen moved to San Francisco Rafkin relocated there to work as a producer and session guitarist. In 1968 after breaking with Erik Jacobsen, Rafkin moved again, this time to Los Angeles. In 1972 he played on the David Blue album Stories and worked with producers Lenny Waronker, Henry Lewy and Larry Marks. Rafkin was a session musician for The Everly Brothers and Gene Vincent. In 1971 The Byrds covered Rafkin’s song "Lazy Waters" on the album Farther Along. Around the same time Rafkin worked on NBC TV’s BJ and the Bear. His song "Ain’t Gonna Rain No More" was featured in the 1996 movie Spree.

In 1973 Rafkin played guitar on the Tim Buckley album Sefronia and on Augie Meyers's Western Head Music Company on Polydor Records. By the mid-1970s Rafkin had enough of the pressures of the music industry and set up his own woodworking business. Rafkin moved again in 1991, this time to Florida, and started to release his own albums (see discography). In 1994 he won the Florida Guitar Finger Picking Championship. In both 1997 and 1999 Rafkin opened for Willie Nelson.

In 2002 and 2003 he toured the UK with country artist Annie Sims - after which Rafkin came to the UK every year performing as a solo performer. While on tour in 2011 Rafkin met UK songwriters Malcolm Barnard and Chris Godden, the start of a strong friendship. Their country rock band, Rocky and the Natives, performed and released Rafkin’s "Lazy Waters" in 2012 and the same year Rafkin joined them on several tour dates. In 2013 Rafkin played on their Let’s Hear It For The Old Guys album.

In May 2013 Rafkin died following a struggle with cancer.

== Discography (Solo albums) ==
- 1998 Velvet Hand, Lake Ridge records
- 2001 Down This Road, Lake Ridge records
- 2001 Out of Jericho, Lake Ridge records
- 2001 The Circus Is in Town, Lake Ridge records
- 2001 Six String Christmas, Lake Ridge records
- 2003 One Man Band, Lake Ridge records
- 2006 Songs of Bob Rafkin, Lake Ridge records
- 2007 Eclectic Treehouse, Lake Ridge records
- 2011 Twenty Eleven, Lake Ridge records
