= Rocky and the Natives =

English country rock band

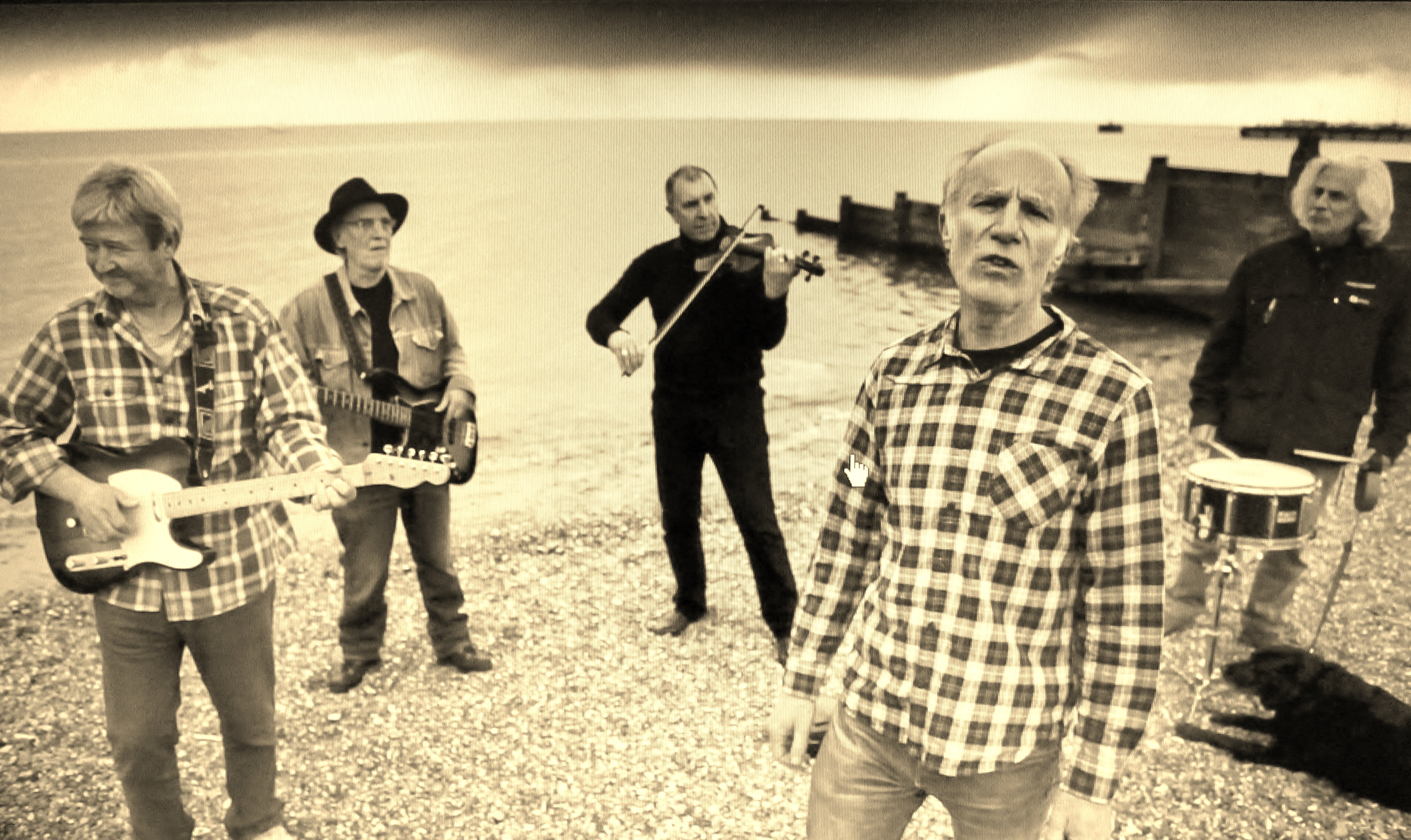
L-R Chris Godden, Jim Leverton, Geoffrey Richardson, Malcolm Barnard, Andy Newmark

Rocky and the Natives are an English country rock band, formed in 2011 in Kent. The band is composed of songwriter/musicians Chris Godden (guitar/lap steel guitar) and Malcolm Barnard (vocals) and featuring Jim Leverton (bass), Andy Newmark (drums) and Geoffrey Richardson (violin and mandolin).

Rocky and the Natives' debut single Oyster Girl was released in July 2011 to coincide with the Whitstable Oyster Festival and with all profits going to Operation Blessing International to support Oystermen in the Urato Islands, Japan. It was reviewed in Maverick Magazine in July 2011. The supporting video was shot on Whitstable beach by Luke Sewell, director of Channel 4's The Undateables series. Researching the Byrds cover of "Lazy Waters" on Farther Along led to a collaboration with American songwriter Bob Rafkin who joined the band on tour in Kent in 2012. In November 2012 the band released their version of Bob's song "Lazy Waters".

In 2012 the band was invited to contribute to the John Lennon tribute album Lennon Bermuda and recorded a version of "Tight A$", a Lennon track from the 1973 album Mind Games.

"Oyster Girl" and "Tight A$" both feature on the band's first album Let’s Hear it for the Old Guys (Yard Dog Records, released September 2013) and reviewed in Maverick Magazine for January/February 2014. The album is dedicated to Bob Rafkin who died in May 2013.
