= 12 String Guitar! Vol. 2 =

Studio album by The Folkswingers
- Released: 1963
- Recorded: 6, 7, 19 August and 6 September 1963
- Studio: World Pacific Studio, Los Angeles, California
- Genre: Folk
- Label: World Pacific
- Producer: Jim Dickson

The Folkswingers chronology
12 String Guitar! (1963)	12 String Guitar! Vol. 2 (1963)	12 String Dobro! (1964)

12 String Guitar! Vol. 2 is the second album by the Folkswingers, released in 1963 on the World Pacific record label. The album contains instrumental versions of popular folk songs, featuring Glen Campbell playing a 12-string guitar. It includes the first released recording of "Get Together", later a hit for The Youngbloods.

== Track listing ==
Side One
No.	Title	Writer(s)	Length
1.	"Don't Think Twice, It's All Right"	Bob Dylan	2:02
2.	"East Virginia"	Traditional	2:06
3.	"This Land Is Your Land"	Woody Guthrie	2:13
4.	"In the Pines"	Huddie Ledbetter	1:57
5.	"Hard Travellin'"	Woody Guthrie	2:09
6.	"Get Together (Amor a Todos)"	Chet Powers	2:22
7.	"Freight Train"	Traditional	2:00

Side Two
No.	Title	Writer(s)	Length
1.	"Greenback Dollar"	Hoyt Axton, Ken Ramsey	1:56
2.	"Where Have All the Flowers Gone?"	Pete Seeger	2:00
3.	"Lemon Tree"	Will Holt	2:28
4.	"Gotta Travel On"	Traditional	2:13
5.	"See See Rider"	Ma Rainey	2:45
6.	"Michael Row That Boat Ashore"	Traditional	1:55
7.	"12 String Special"	Glen Campbell	1:57

== Personnel ==
- Glen Campbell – 12 string guitar
- Donavan Cotton – drums
- Keith Mitchell – bass
- James E. Bond – bass
- Billy Ray Lathum – banjo

== Production ==
- Producer – Jim Dickson
