= Doug Dillard =

American banjoist (1937–2012)

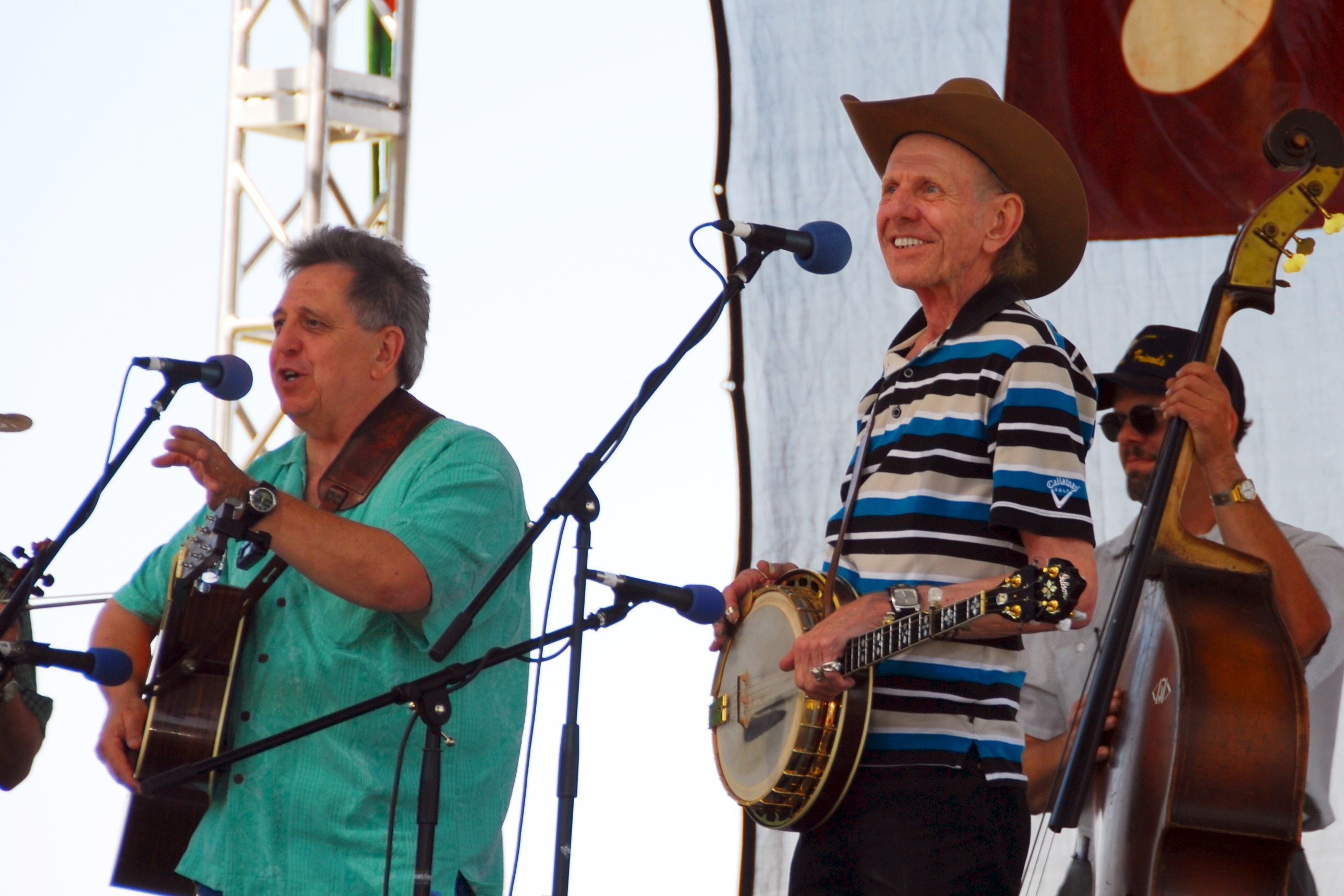
- Rodney and Doug Dillard (right) in 2007 at the Huck Finn Jubilee in Ontario, California

Background information
- Born: Douglas Flint Dillard; March 6, 1937; East St. Louis, Illinois, U.S.
- Died: May 16, 2012 (aged 75) Nashville, Tennessee, U.S.
- Genres: Bluegrass, country, acoustic, folk
- Occupation: Musician
- Instrument: Banjo
- Years active: 1953–2012

Douglas Flint Dillard (March 6, 1937 – May 16, 2012) was an American musician noted for his banjo proficiency and his pioneering participation in late-'60s country rock.

== Biography ==
=== Early life ===
Dillard, who grew up on a farm near Salem, Missouri, began learning guitar and fiddle at age five, and banjo at age 15. He began playing in the family band, with his father Homer Sr. on fiddle, his mother Lorene on guitar, and his older brother Earl on keyboards.

His banjo heroes were Earl Scruggs, Ralph Stanley, and Don Reno. After corresponding with Scruggs, Dillard persuaded his parents to drive him to Scruggs' home in Madison, Tennessee, where Scruggs installed "Scruggs Tuners" on Dillard's banjo.

By age 19, Dillard was performing regularly on a weekly radio show hosted by Howe Teague on KSMO, a Salem radio station.

=== Ozark Mountain Boys and the Dixie Ramblers ===
From 1956 to 1959, Doug was a founding member of the Ozark Mountain Boys with his younger brother Rodney, along with Bill Glenn, Henry and Jim Lewis, and Paul Breidenbach. Mitch Jayne (future member of The Dillards) invited the Ozark Mountain Boys to play on his KSMO Saturday morning radio show, Hickory Hollow.

In 1958, Doug and Rodney joined the Dixie Ramblers, based in St. Louis. Other members included John Hartford (who had frequently played fiddle with Dillard's father), Buddy Van Hoosier, and Joel Noel.

=== The Dillards ===
Doug and Rodney began performing on their own, and recorded a single "Banjo in the Hollow" for K-Ark Records, followed by three more single releases. With the addition of Dean Webb (mandolin) and Mitch Jayne (bass), they formed The Dillards in 1962. Inspired by their popularity on college campuses, The Dillards moved to Los Angeles. They participated in several after-hours club sessions, and then recording industry executive Jim Dickson signed them to a contract with Elektra Records.

=== The Andy Griffith Show ===
Andy Griffith's manager Dick Linke arranged an audition for the Dillards to play the part of a musical backwoods family on The Andy Griffith Show. Along with Denver Pyle and Margaret Ann Peterson, they were the Darlings of Mayberry from 1963 to 1966. Doug was given the name of Jebbin Darling. They made six appearances, and are credited with introducing bluegrass music to a wider audience. This led to guest spots on shows hosted by Judy Garland and Tennessee Ernie Ford, and on other variety shows.

=== The Folkswingers ===
Doug and Rodney Dillard created the Folkswingers, a side project teaming their talents with Glen Campbell and Tut Taylor. The Folkswingers recorded two albums for the World Pacific record label.

=== Dillard and Clark ===
In 1968, Doug left the Dillards and joined the Byrds for their first European tour. Then he teamed up with Gene Clark to record two albums as Dillard & Clark. Other participating musicians included Bernie Leadon, Mike Clarke, and Byron Berline. Blending banjo, fiddle, drums, electric guitars, steel guitar, and keyboards, Dillard and Clark played an important role in the country rock popularity expansion. Others bands following their example soon appeared, such as the Flying Burrito Brothers, Poco, and the Eagles.

=== Solo career ===
In 1966, Doug and Rodney Dillard provided music for the film Bonnie and Clyde. Dillard played banjo on Glen Campbell's recording of John Hartford's "Gentle on My Mind." This recording earned four Grammy Awards in 1968.

In 1969, Doug recorded the Banjo Album, followed by other solo projects. He also performed extensive session work, including TV ads and guest appearances, film scores, and numerous sessions for other musical artists.

In 1982, he launched the Doug Dillard Band. Through the subsequent years, he also maintained his solo career and occasionally reunited with Rodney for projects and performances.

The Dillards briefly reunited in 1986 to appear in the TV film Return to Mayberry. They also toured as the Original Dillards.

=== Awards ===
In 1989, Dillard's album Heartbreak Hotel was nominated by the Recording Academy for the Grammy Award for Best Bluegrass Recording.

In 2009, the Dillards were inducted into the Bluegrass Hall of Fame by the International Bluegrass Music Association (IBMA).

Dillard was inducted individually into the Society for the Preservation of Bluegrass Music of America (SPBGMA) Preservation Hall of Greats in 1992.

=== Death ===
Dillard suffered a collapsed lung, in several months developed a lung infection, and died in a Nashville hospital. He had stopped touring several years before his death but still participated in occasional recording sessions and a few concert performances.

== Filmography ==
Year	Title	Role	Notes
1979	The Rose	Billy Ray Band	
1980	Popeye	Clem, the Banjo Player	
