= The Dillards =

American bluegrass band

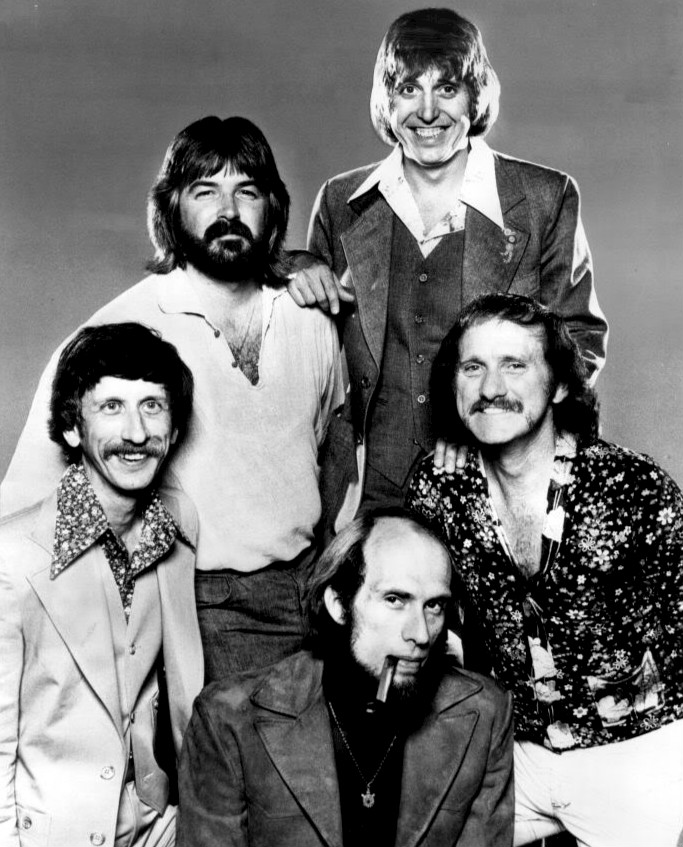
- The band in 1977

Background information
- Origin: Salem, Missouri, U.S.
- Genres: Progressive bluegrass; country rock
- Years active: 1963–present
- Members: Rodney Dillard; Beverly Cotton-Dillard
- Website: www.rodneydillard.tv

The Dillards are an American bluegrass and country rock band from Salem, Missouri. They are notable for being among the first bluegrass groups to have electrified their instruments, and they are considered to be pioneers of country rock and progressive bluegrass. In 2022, the band was inducted into the Bill Monroe Bluegrass Hall of Fame.

== Biography ==
The band was originally brothers Doug Dillard and Rodney Dillard, plus Mitch Jayne and Dean Webb. They had had some successful singles in Missouri and moved to Los Angeles in 1962. Within weeks of their arrival, they were signed by both Elektra Records and the William Morris Agency, which soon had them booked on The Andy Griffith Show, playing a family of mountain musicians called "The Darlings". This was a recurring role, running from 1963 to 1966. In 1986, the Dillards reprised the role in the reunion show Return to Mayberry. On the October 1963 episode "Briscoe Declares for Aunt Bee", the Dillards performed the first wide-scale airing of the 1955 Arthur "Guitar Boogie" Smith composition Feudin' Banjos (Dueling Banjos). Several albums have since featured songs performed on the show.

The Dillards released four albums in quick succession, but in 1967, Doug wrote and performed the banjo music for the soundtrack of the movie Bonnie and Clyde. That led to an invitation to tour with the Byrds, and he left the band; later, he released solo albums and formed the band Dillard and Clark.

In 1968, with Doug Dillard replaced by Herb Pedersen, the Dillards released the album Wheatstraw Suite, which Elektra founder Jac Holzman called "one of the most innovative bluegrass albums of all time". The album "broke all the rules of bluegrass music", said Rodney Dillard. "We put strings on it, we went electric, we used drums, and we put layered vocals on it." Backlash from the bluegrass community arose, but the album inspired artists such as Steve Martin, Don Henley, and Led Zeppelin's John Paul Jones, who attributed his decision to play the mandolin to their influence.

In 1970, the band released Copperfields, a more progressive album with more orchestra and more drums. It was a further step away from traditional bluegrass, but continued to progress the genre and keep it in the public eye. One artist who was profoundly influenced by both albums was Elton John, who said that on his first trip to America, his first act was to see a Dillards concert. In 1973, the Dillards joined John on his Goodbye Yellow Brick Road tour. During the tour, the Dillards released Roots and Branches, which became their most commercially successful album.

In 1989, Nitty Gritty Dirt Band co-founder John McEuen, a long-time Dillards fan, wanted to capture the spirit and energy of the Dillards on film; the result was the 80-minute video A Night in the Ozarks.

In 2002, The Dillards performed with Arlo Guthrie and Pete Seeger at Carnegie Hall. In 2008, Guthrie and the Dillards released 32 Cents, Postage Due, an album of Woody Guthrie songs.

Over the years, the band has seen many personnel changes. Rodney and his wife, Beverly Cotton-Dillard, are the only remaining full-time members. Beverly is a native of Morrisville, North Carolina, who performed with Janette Carter, Ola Belle Reed, Tommy Jarrell, and Doc and Merle Watson. Cotton-Dillard is recognized as an authority on the traditional clawhammer banjo technique, and her 1981 album Clog-In: An American Folk Dance Classic is considered an American folk classic.

The Dillards continue to release new music. For their most recent album, 2020's Old Road New Again, they called upon Herb Pedersen, Ricky Skaggs, Sam Bush, Bernie Leadon, and Don Henley to perform.

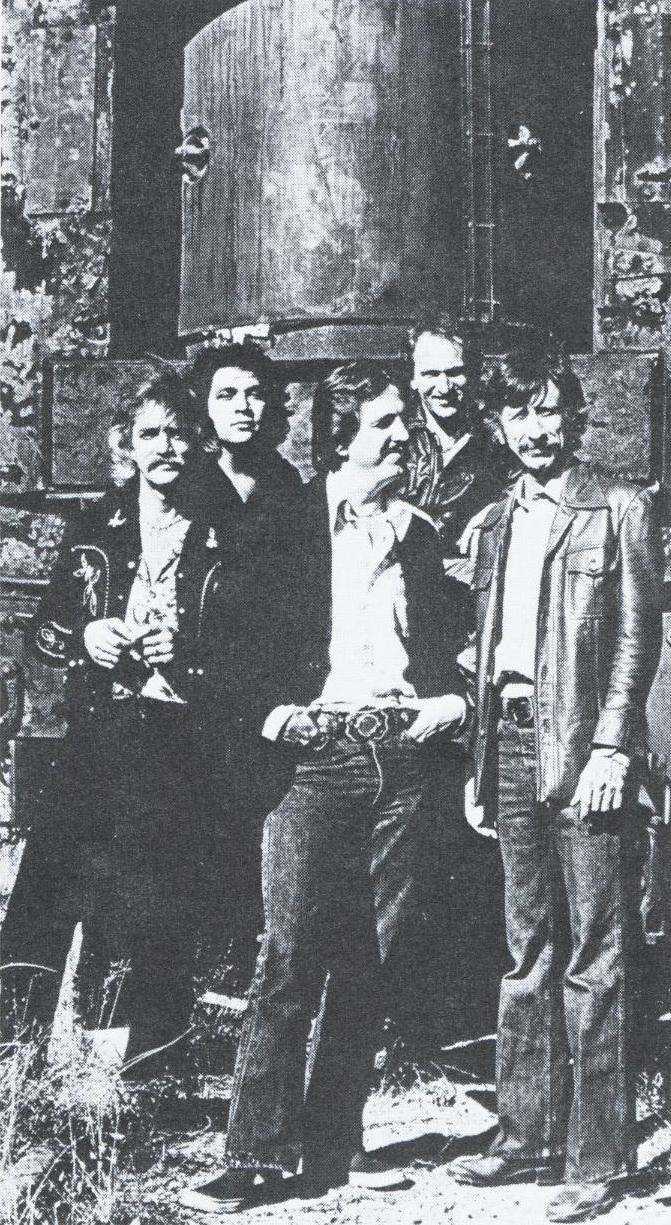
The Dillards circa 1981

=== Past members ===
- Byron Berline (d. 2021)
- Buddy Blackmon
- Douglas Bounsall (d. 2012)
- Bill Bryson (d. 2017)
- Billy Constable (d. 2015)
- Steve Cooley
- Douglas Dillard (d. 2012)
- Irv Dugan
- George Giddens
- Jeff Gilkinson
- Jim Glaspy
- Richard Godfrey
- Pete Grant
- John Humphreys
- Mitchell F. Jayne (d. 2010)
- Shane Lail
- Billy Ray Latham (d. 2018)
- Dewey Martin (d. 2009)
- Rick McEwen
- Seth Pappas
- Herb Pedersen
- Eddie Ponder (d. 2018)
- Gary Smith
- Joe Villegas
- Dean Webb (d. 2018)
- Ric Williams
- Tony Wray
- Paul Yorks

== Discography ==
=== Albums ===
| Year | Album | Chart Positions | | Label |
| Year | Album | US | CAN | Label |
|---|---|---|---|---|
| 1963 | Back Porch Bluegrass | — | — | Elektra |
| 1964 | Live!!!! Almost!!! | — | — | Elektra |
| 1965 | Pickin' and Fiddlin' (with Byron Berline) | — | — | Elektra |
| 1965 | Western Jamboree | — | — | Elektra |
| 1968 | Wheatstraw Suite | — | — | Elektra |
| 1970 | Copperfields | — | — | Elektra |
| 1972 | Roots and Branches | 79 | 56 | Anthem |
| 1973 | Tribute to the American Duck | — | — | Poppy |
| 1977 | The Dillards vs. The Incredible L.A. Time Machine | — | — | Flying Fish |
| 1977 | Glitter Grass from the Nashwood Hollyville Strings, with John Hartford | — | — | Flying Fish |
| 1978 | Mountain Rock | — | — | Crystal Clear |
| 1979 | Decade Waltz | — | — | Flying Fish |
| 1980 | Homecoming and Family Reunion | — | — | Flying Fish |
| 1984 | Silver Dollar Jubilee | — | — | Silver Dollar City |
| 1989 | A Night In The Ozarks (video) | — | — | John McEuen |
| 1991 | Let It Fly | — | — | Vanguard |
| 1992 | Take Me Along for the Ride | — | — | Vanguard |
| 1999 | A Long Time Ago: The First Time Live | — | — | Varèse Sarabande |
| 2006 | Early Recordings – 1959 | — | — | Varèse Sarabande |
| 2008 | 32¢ Postage Due (with Arlo Guthrie) | — | — | Rising Son |
| 2020 | Old Road New Again | — | — | Pinecastle Records |

=== Compilations ===
| Year | Album | Label |
|---|---|---|
| 1976 | Country Tracks/The Best of the Dillards | Elektra |
| 1986 | I'll Fly Away | Edsel |
| 1991 | There Is a Time (1963–70) | Vanguard |
| 1995 | The Best of The Darlin' Boys | Vanguard |
| 1996 | Roots and Branches/Tribute to the American Duck | Beat Goes On |
| 2001 | Back Porch Bluegrass & Live!!!! Almost!!! | Warner Strategic Marketing |
| 2004 | Pickin' and Fiddlin', Wheatstraw Suite & Copperfields | Warner Strategic Marketing |
| 2005 | Let The Music Flow: The Best of the Dillards 1963–1979 | Raven |

=== Singles ===
| Year | Title | Billboard Hot 100 | Album | Label |
|---|---|---|---|---|
| 1963 | "Dooley" | — | Back Porch Bluegrass | Elektra |
| 1963 | "Hootin' Banjo" (Duelin' Banjo) | — | Back Porch Bluegrass | Elektra |
| 1965 | "Nobody Knows" | — | singles only | Capitol |
| 1966 | "The Last Thing On My Mind" | — | singles only | Capitol |
| 1968 | "Reason To Believe" | — | Wheatstraw Suite | Elektra |
| 1969 | "Listen To The Sound" | — | Wheatstraw Suite | Elektra |
| 1970 | "Rainmaker" | — | Copperfields | Elektra |
| 1970 | "Close The Door Lightly" | — | Copperfields | Elektra |
| 1970 | "One Too Many Mornings" | — | singles only | White Whale |
| 1970 | "Comin' Home Again" | — | singles only | White Whale |
| 1971 | "It's About Time" | No. 92 | singles only | Anthem |
| 1972 | "One A.M." | No. 111 | Roots and Branches | Anthem |
| 1972 | "America (The Lady Of The Harbor)" | — | single only | Anthem |
| 1973 | "Hot Rod Banjo" | — | Tribute to the American Duck | Poppy |
| 1975 | "Stones Throw Away" | — | single only | United Artists |
| 1977 | "The Poet" | — | The Dillards Vs. The Incredible L.A. Time Machine | Sonet |
