= Mitchell F. Jayne =

Mitchell Jayne
- Also known as: Mitch Jayne
- Born: Mitchell Franklin Jayne; July 5, 1928; Hammond, Indiana, U.S.
- Died: August 2, 2010 (aged 82) Columbia, Missouri, U.S.
- Occupations: Emcee, bass player
- Instrument: Double bass

Mitchell Franklin "Mitch" Jayne (July 5, 1928 – August 2, 2010) was an American musician, best known as emcee and upright bass player in The Dillards bluegrass band, the band often remembered for their several Andy Griffith Show appearances as the Darling Family, 1963–1966, as well as touring throughout southern California in the late 1960s.

Jayne was an author, musician, and storyteller. Several tunes which he co-wrote with The Dillards are now considered bluegrass classics. Dooley; There is a Time; The Old Home Place, and The Whole World Round. He also authored four books, Home Grown Stories & Home Fried Lies, The Forest in the Wind, Old Fish Hawk, and Fiddler's Ghost. Jayne had almost finished another novel, The Morning Glory War, prior to his death at age 82, with only one chapter left unwritten. He narrated the ending to his editor during the last two weeks of his life and that book has been released by Wildstone Media as of June 1,2026.

== Personal life ==
Jayne, born in Hammond, Indiana, was the son of Bea and Gus Jayne. Following US Navy service and after a stint at the University of Missouri, he began teaching in one-room schools in Dent County, where he documented the use of the forgotten words and phrases of Elizabethan English spoken by his pupils.

Turning his talents to other venues, Jayne authored a weekly column in the Shannon County Current Wave, in his adopted Ozark hometown of Eminence, Missouri. He hosted a radio show in Salem, Missouri at KSMO that attracted national attention for its satire, including the Snake and Tick Market Report, a regular feature that reported market prices for Hoo-Boy White Dot Crushproof Dry Valley Wonder Ticks and black, copperhead, coachwhip, garter and rattle snakes.
