= Chris Hillman discography =

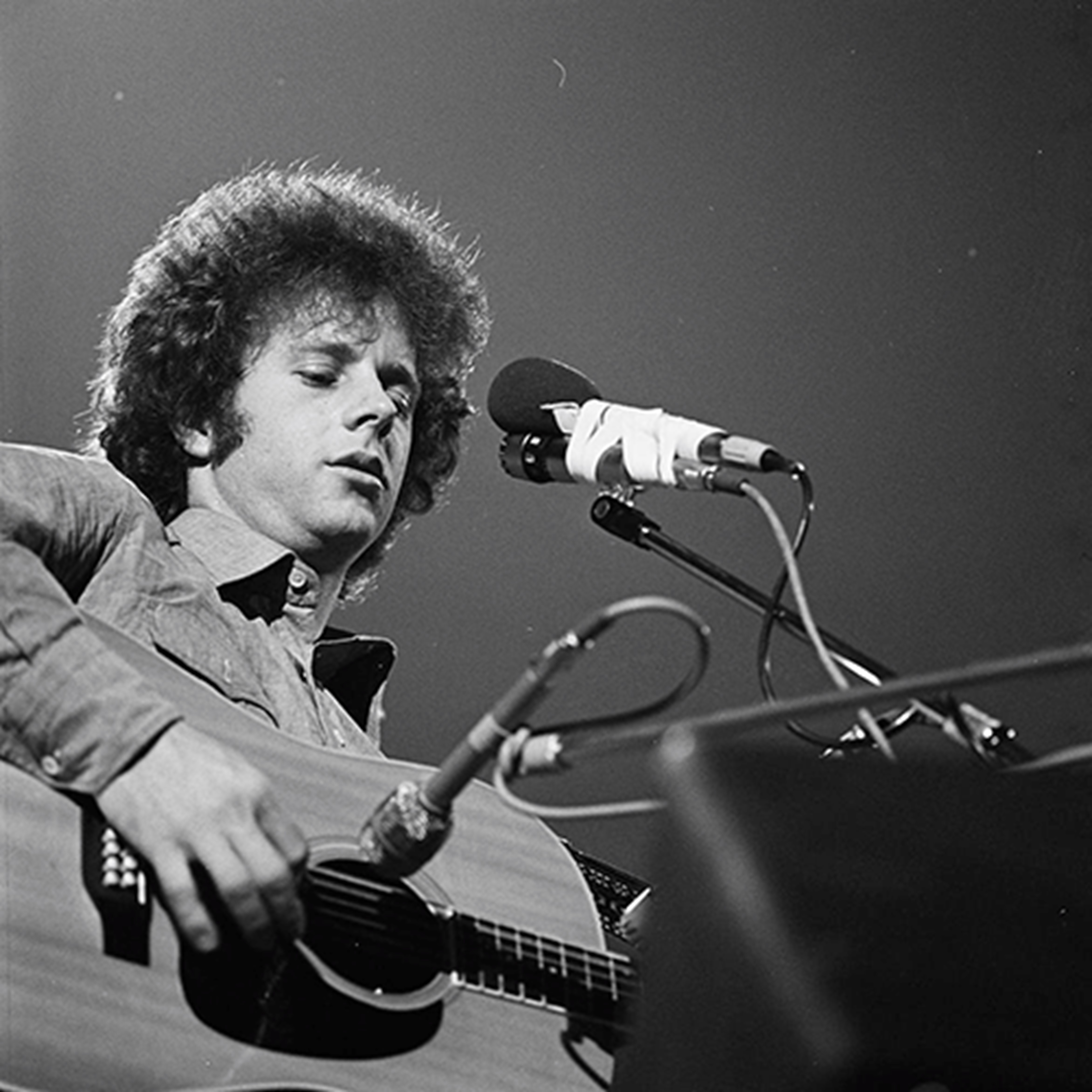
- Chris Hillman in 1972.
- Studio albums: 6
- Singles: 9

Chris Hillman is an American musician and songwriter. In addition to his solo albums and his recordings with the Byrds, the Flying Burrito Brothers, and the Desert Rose Band, he has been featured as a collaborator with and composer for many other artists.

== Solo recordings ==
Title	Album details	Peak chart positions				Sales
Title	Album details	US	US Country	US Folk	US Bluegrass	Sales
Slippin' Away	Release date: 1976; Label: Asylum	152	—	—	—	
Clear Sailin'	Release date: 1977; Label: Asylum	188	—	—	—	
Morning Sky	Release date: 1982; Label: Sugar Hill	—	—	—	—	
Desert Rose	Release date: 1984; Label: Sugar Hill	—	—	—	—	
Like a Hurricane	Release date: 1998; Label: Sugar Hill	—	—	—	—	
The Other Side	Release date: June 21, 2005; Label: Cooking Vinyl / Sovereign	—	—	—	9	
Bidin' My Time	Release date: September 22, 2017; Label: Rounder	152	37	14	2	US: 9,100
"—" denotes releases that did not chart

== Singles ==
- 1976: "Love Is The Sweetest Amnesty" / "Falling Again" (Asylum)
- 1976: "Step On Out" / "Take It On the Run" (Asylum)
- 1977: "Heartbreaker" / "Lucky In Love" (Asylum)
- 1977: "Slippin' Away" / "Take me in your Lifeboat" (Asylum)
- 1980: "Turn Your Radio On" (Capitol) with Roger McGuinn
- 1980: "Love Me Tonight" (Capitol) with Roger McGuinn
- 1984: "Somebody's Back In Town" / "Desert Rose" (Sugar Hill)
- 1989: "You Ain't Going Nowhere" / "Don't You Hear Jerusalem Moan" (Universal) with Roger McGuinn and Nitty Gritty Dirt Band
- 2005: "Eight Miles High" / "True Love" / "Drifting (Cooking Vinyl)

== As a member of the Scottsville Squirrel Barkers ==
- 1963: The Scottsville Squirrel Barkers Blue Grass Favorites (Crown)

== As a member of the Hillmen ==
- 1969: The Hillmen The Hillmen (Together)

== As a member of the Byrds ==
- 1964: Pre-Flyte Sessions (Together) first released in 1969
- 1965: Mr. Tambourine Man (Columbia)
- 1965: Turn! Turn! Turn! (Columbia)
- 1966: Fifth Dimension (Columbia)
- 1967: Younger Than Yesterday (Columbia)
- 1967: The Byrds' Greatest Hits (Columbia) - US: Platinum
- 1968: The Notorious Byrd Brothers (Columbia)
- 1968: Sweetheart of the Rodeo (Columbia)
- 1973: Byrds (Asylum)

== As a member of the Flying Burrito Brothers ==
- 1969: The Gilded Palace of Sin (A&M)
- 1970: Burrito Deluxe (A&M)
- 1971: The Flying Burrito Brothers (A&M)
- 1972: Last of the Red Hot Burritos (A&M)
- 1974: Close Up the Honky Tonks (A&M)
- 1974: Honky Tonk Heaven (Ariola)
- 1976: Sleepless Nights (A&M)
- 1988: Farther Along (A&M)
- 1987: Dim Lights, Thick Smoke, and Loud, Loud Music (Edsel)
- 1996: Out of the Blue (A&M)

== As a member of Manassas ==
Albums

- 1972: Manassas (Atlantic) - US:Gold
- 1973: Down the Road (Atlantic)

Compilations

- 2009: Pieces (Rhino) alternate takes and outtakes

== As a member of the Souther–Hillman–Furay Band ==
- 1974: The Souther Hillman Furay Band (Asylum) - US: Gold
- 1975: Trouble in Paradise (Asylum)

== As a member of McGuinn, Clark & Hillman ==
Albums

- 1979: McGuinn, Clark & Hillman (Capitol)
- 1980: City (Capitol)
- 1977: Three Byrds Land in London (Windsong / Strange Fruit) BBC live recordings

Compilations

- 1992: Return Flight I (Edsel)
- 1993: Return Flight II (Edsel)
- 2007; The Capitol Collection (Capitol)

== With Roger McGuinn ==
- 1980: McGuinn / Hillman (Capitol)

== With Down Home Praise ==
- 1983: Down Home Praise (Maranatha! Music)

== With Ever Call Ready ==
- 1985: Ever Call Ready (Maranatha!) with Al Perkins, Bernie Leadon, David Mansfield, and Jerry Scheff

== As a member of the Desert Rose Band ==
Albums

- 1987: The Desert Rose Band (Curb / MCA)
- 1988: Running (Curb / MCA)
- 1990: Pages of Life (Curb / MCA)
- 1991: True Love (Curb / MCA)
- 1993: Life Goes On (Curb)

Compilations

- 1991: A Dozen Roses – Greatest Hits (MCA)

== With Herb Pedersen ==
- 1996: Bakersfield Bound (Sugar Hill)
- 2003: Way Out West (Back Porch)
- 2010: At Edwards Barn (Rounder)

== With Larry Rice, Tony Rice, and Herb Pedersen ==
- 1997: Out of the Woodwork (Rounder)
- 1999: Rice, Rice, Hillman & Pedersen (Rounder)
- 2001: Running Wild (Rounder)

== With Roger McGuinn, Marty Stuart and His Fabulous Superlatives ==
- 2024: Celebrate the 50th Anniversary of Sweetheart of the Rodeo LIVE! (Friday Music)
