= The Hillmen (album) =

Studio album by The Hillmen
- Released: 1969
- Recorded: 1963–1964
- Studio: World Pacific Studios, Hollywood, California
- Genre: Bluegrass
- Label: Together/Sugar Hill
- Producer: Jim Dickson

Alternative cover
- Cover of the 1996 reissue (SUG-CD 3719)

The Hillmen is a studio album by the Hillmen, a southern California bluegrass band originally known as the Golden State Boys. The Hillmen consisted of Chris Hillman (later of the Byrds, the Flying Burrito Brothers, Manassas and the Desert Rose Band) on mandolin, country singer/songwriter Vern Gosdin on guitar and lead vocals, his brother Rex Gosdin on double bass, and Don Parmley (later of the Bluegrass Cardinals) on banjo.

== History ==
The album was recorded by Jim Dickson over the course of three months in 1963 and 1964. Dickson had been granted free use of World Pacific Studios in Los Angeles at night time, and this is where the band recorded "live" onto a three-track recorder using used magnetic tape.

The Hillmen album was originally released in 1969 on the Together label (catalogue number ST-T 1012). It was reissued in 1981 (SH 3719) and 1996 (SUG-CD 3719) by Sugar Hill Records.

== Track listing ==
=== Side 1 ===
1. "Fair and Tender Ladies" (Traditional) – 3:04
2. "Winsborough Cotton Mill Blues" (Pete Seeger) – 3:15
3. "Wheel Hoss" (Bill Monroe) – 2:25
4. "Fair Thee Well" (Bob Dylan) – 2:58
5. "Goin' Up" (Vern Gosdin, Rex Gosdin) – 2:19
6. "With These Chains" (unknown) – unknown

=== Side 2 ===
1. "When the Ship Comes In" (Bob Dylan) – 3:03
2. "Roll on Muddy River" (Vern Gosdin, Rex Gosdin) – 2:27
3. "Blue Grass Chopper" (Chris Hillman, Vern Gosdin, Rex Gosdin, Don Parmley) – 1:26
4. "Ranger's Command" (Woody Guthrie) – 3:00
5. "Prisoner's Plea" (Vern Gosdin, Rex Gosdin) – 2:57

=== 1981 reissue ===
==== Side 1 ====
1. "Brown Mountain Lights" (Scotty Wiseman) – 2:10
2. "Ranger's Command" (Woody Guthrie) – 3:00
3. "Sangaree" (Traditional) – 1:56
4. "Blue Grass Chopper" (Chris Hillman, Vern Gosdin, Rex Gosdin, Don Parmley) – 1:26
5. "Barbara Allen" (Traditional) – 3:11
6. "Fair and Tender Ladies" (Traditional) – 3:04
7. "Goin' Up" (Vern Gosdin, Rex Gosdin) – 2:19

==== Side 2 ====
1. "When the Ship Comes In" (Bob Dylan) – 3:03
2. "Fair Thee Well" (Bob Dylan) – 2:58
3. "Winsborough Cotton Mill Blues" (Pete Seeger) – 3:15
4. "Prisoner's Plea" (Vern Gosdin, Rex Gosdin) – 2:57
5. "Back Road Fever" (Vern Gosdin, Rex Gosdin) – 1:56
6. "Roll on Muddy River" (Vern Gosdin, Rex Gosdin) – 2:27

=== 1996 reissue ===
1. "Brown Mountain Light" (Scott Wiseman) – 2:10
2. "Ranger's Command" (Woody Guthrie) – 3:00
3. "Sangaree" (Traditional) – 1:56
4. "Blue Grass Chopper" (Chris Hillman, Vern Gosdin, Rex Gosdin, Don Parmley) – 1:26
5. "Barbara Allen" (Traditional) – 3:11
6. "Fair and Tender Ladies" (Traditional) – 3:04
7. "Goin' Up" (Vern Gosdin, Rex Gosdin) – 2:19
8. "Wheel Hoss" (Bill Monroe) – 2:25
9. "When the Ship Comes In" (Bob Dylan) – 3:03
10. "Fair Thee Well" (Bob Dylan) – 2:58
11. "Winsborough Cotton Mill Blues" (Pete Seeger) – 3:15
12. "Prisoner's Plea" (Vern Gosdin, Rex Gosdin) – 2:57
13. "Back Road Fever" (Vern Gosdin, Rex Gosdin) – 1:56
14. "Copper Kettle" (Traditional) – 3:49
15. "Roll on Muddy River" (Vern Gosdin, Rex Gosdin) – 2:27

== Personnel ==
- Rex Gosdin – bass, tenor vocals
- Vern Gosdin – guitar, lead vocals
- Chris Hillman – mandolin, vocals (track 9)
- Don Parmley – banjo, baritone vocals

=== Additional personnel ===
- Jim Dickson – producer
- Dino Lappas – engineering
- Bill McElroy – engineering
