= Death, Love & Buildings =

Studio album by Tinpan Orange
- Released: 2007
- Recorded: Sing Sing Studios and Studio 62; Melbourne, Australia
- Genre: Folk, indie
- Label: Vitamin Records
- Producer: Jimi Maroudas, Jesse Lubitz, Emily Lubitz

Tinpan Orange chronology
Aroona Palace (2005)	Death, Love & Buildings (2007)	The Bottom of the Lake (2009)

Death, Love & Buildings is the second album by Melbourne band Tinpan Orange, released on Vitamin Records in 2007. The album features Renee Geyer on "The Roof". A video for "Myself & the Devil" was directed by Victor Holder.

== Track listing ==
1. "She Watched Him Dance" – 4:37
2. "Myself & the Devil – 4:33
3. "Waiting to Fall" – 4:09
4. "Narcissus" – 3:59
5. "Ladies & Gentlemen" – 2:53
6. "The Tide" – 3:54
7. "Dying Man" – 2:51
8. "Sunflower" – 3:42
9. "The Counting Song" – 4:05
10. "The Balcony" – 5:30
11. "The Roof" – 4:49
12. "Bottle of Whiskey" – 2:31

== Personnel ==
- Emily Lubitz – Vocals, Guitar
- Jesse Lubitz – Guitar, Vocals
- Alex Burkoy – Violin, Mandolin and Guitar
- Gidon Symons – Bass
- Joel Witenberg – Drums and Percussion

=== Technical personnel ===
- Jimi Maroudas – producer, engineer, mixer
- Tony "Jack the Bear" Mantz – mastering
- Paul Joffe – photography
- Megg Evans – design
