= Farewell (Bob Dylan song) =

1963 song by Bob Dylan released in 2010

Song by Bob Dylan

from the album The Bootleg Series Vol. 9: The Witmark Demos: 1962–1964
- Released: October 19, 2010
- Recorded: March 1963
- Studio: M. Witmark & Sons, New York City
- Genre: Folk
- Length: 5:00
- Label: Columbia
- Songwriter: Bob Dylan

"Farewell" (also known as "Fare Thee Well") is a song by the American singer-songwriter Bob Dylan. Dylan wrote the song in January 1963. He considered it for his third album, The Times They Are a-Changin', but only attempted a few takes during the album's first studio session. Dylan's earlier recordings of "Farewell" found their way onto various bootlegs, and a collection of demos that included the song was released in October 2010 as The Bootleg Series Vol. 9 – The Witmark Demos: 1962–1964.

Over the years, "Farewell" has been recorded by about 20 other musicians worldwide, including Pete Seeger, Judy Collins, Lonnie Donegan, Dion, and Tony Rice.

== Dylan's recordings ==
Dylan first recorded "Farewell" on February 8, 1963, along with 11 other songs, during a session that for many years was believed to have taken place in the basement of either Gerde's Folk City or the Gaslight Cafe, Greenwich Village venues where Dylan performed during the early 1960s. His friend Happy Traum, then with The New World Singers, backed him on vocals and banjo. The recordings were eventually bootlegged under the title The Banjo Tape. Decades later, in interviews with author Michael Gray, Traum identified the session's location as the East Village apartment of Gil Turner, who worked at Gerde's and was an editor for the folk music magazine Broadside.

A month after the session with Traum, Dylan recorded the song as a demo for his music publisher M. Witmark & Sons. The demo version, which appeared on several bootlegs, was officially released on the Witmark Demos. During the time Dylan was making periodic trips to Witmark's Manhattan studios, between 1962 and 1964, he was also visiting Broadside to tape songs for publication. In April 1963, he recorded "Farewell" for the magazine, and a transcription of its lyrics and music appeared in that month's issue. Also in April, Dylan went to Chicago to appear at The Bear, a folk music club owned by his manager Albert Grossman. The next day, April 26, he was interviewed during a taping of author Studs Terkel's radio show on WFMT. He played seven songs on the show, opening with "Farewell" (the seventh was "Blowin' in the Wind"). Four months later during the first of six Times They Are a-Changin' sessions, Dylan recorded four takes of the song, none of them complete.

Only one live recording of the song is known to exist, released on The 50th Anniversary Collection 1963. Dylan played relatively few concerts during 1963. Besides a couple solo dates that year and performances as a "surprise guest" at several Joan Baez concerts, he made appearances at the Brandeis Folk Festival in Massachusetts, Monterey Folk Festival in California and Newport Folk Festival in Rhode Island. He began touring in earnest the next year, both solo performances and a series of concert dates co-billed with Baez. "Farewell" does not appear on the setlists from either year's concerts.

A shorter, previously unreleased studio version of the song was released on the soundtrack of the Coen brothers' 2013 film Inside Llewyn Davis (although the "Witmark Demos" version was used in the actual film).

== Song's origin and meaning ==
Dylan based the song on the traditional British folk ballad "Leaving of Liverpool". He first played it for friends in Greenwich Village after returning from a two-week trip to London in early January 1963. In "Leaving of Liverpool", the ballad's first verse and chorus tell the tale of someone sailing from Liverpool to California, bound to miss the loved one left behind:

Farewell to you, my own true love;

I am going far away.
I am bound for Californ-i-a,

And I know that I'll return someday.

So fare thee well, my own true love,

And when I return, united we will be.
It's not the leavin' of Liverpool that grieves me,

But, my darling, when I think of thee.

The opening lyrics in Dylan's song are very similar:

Oh it's fare-thee-well, my darlin' true,

I'm a-leavin' in the first hour of the morn.
I'm bound off for the Bay of Mexico,

Or maybe the coast of Cal-i-forn.

So it's fare-thee-well, my own true love,

We'll meet an-other day, an-other time;
It's not the leavin' that's a-grievin' me,

But my darlin' who's bound to stay behind.

Obvious similarities aside, the story and sentiments of the two songs differ. In "The Leaving of Liverpool", the narrator is bound for California by sea and promises to return. In "Farewell", the narrator mentions traveling by highway and trail, with California as one of two possible destinations, neither of them definite. As Dylan's narrator says, "I'm ramblin'...unnoticed and unknown." While indicating they will "meet another day, another time", the traveler promises only to think of his loved one and write from "time to time", without any mention of returning.

Scottish singer Allan McLeod tells about the time he sang The Leaving of Liverpool as featured singer in an English folk club. Bob Dylan was visiting and sang one song. After the show, he asked Allan to write out the lyrics to The Leaving of Liverpool. One wag has hypothesized that Dylan wrote Farewell because he couldn't read Allan's handwriting.

== Recordings by other artists ==
In 1963, folk singer Pete Seeger, who was closely associated with Broadside, recorded "Farewell" for The Broadside Ballads, Volume 2, a collection of songs Seeger selected from the pages of the magazine. Seeger's version was issued as "Fare-Thee-Well (My Own True Love)", the title from the published transcription. Judy Collins recorded it along with "Masters of War" for Judy Collins 3 as the first of many Dylan songs she would do over the next four decades. The Hillmen also recorded the song in 1963 for their eponymous first album under the simpler title "Fare Thee Well". The group featured Chris Hillman, a mandolin player who the next year switched to electric bass to become a founding member of The Byrds.

Two recordings of "Farewell" were issued in 1964 using the simpler title from Dylan's Times They Are a-Changin' setlist, "Farewell". Anita and Helen Carter from the famed traditional folk group The Carter Family recorded it for their self-titled album. The Modern Folk Quartet also put out a version on the album Changes. One of the quartet's singers was Tim Buckley, who would later be hailed as "one of the great rock vocalists of the 1960s".

In 1965, The Kingston Trio, who six years before led the way in establishing folk as a commercial genre, recorded "Farewell" for Nick Bob John, listing it under both titles, "Farewell (Fare Thee Well)". British skiffle musician Lonnie Donegan on The Folk Album, also released a version of the song in 1965. Four years later, Dion DiMucci, leader of rock 'n roll's Dion and the Belmonts, issued a solo folk rock album, Wonder Where I'm Bound. The album, produced by Tom Wilson, who worked with Dylan on Bringing It All Back Home, included two Dylan songs, "It's All Over Now, Baby Blue" and "Farewell". Other notable releases of "Farewell" in later years included Greek singer Nana Mouskouri's version on her album Turn on the Sun, released in 1970, Irish folk singer Liam Clancy's version on 1975's Farewell To Tarwaithie and on 1982's The Dutchman and bluegrass musician Tony Rice's on 1984's Cold on the Shoulder.
