= The Bottom of the Lake =

Studio album by Tinpan Orange
- Released: August 2009
- Recorded: Fairhaven Studios and Studio 62; Melbourne, Australia
- Genre: Folk, Indie
- Length: 47:33
- Label: Vitamin Records
- Producer: Harry James Angus

Tinpan Orange chronology
Death, Love & Buildings (2007)	The Bottom of the Lake (2009)	Over the Sun (2012)

The Bottom of the Lake is the third album by Melbourne band Tinpan Orange, released on Vitamin Records in 2009. The album was produced by Harry Angus of The Cat Empire, and Angus also plays several instruments on the album. "Lovely" was released as a single.

== Track listing ==
(All tracks by Emily Lubitz except where noted)

1. "Romeo Don't Come" – 3:43
2. "The Bottom of the Lake" – 5:14
3. "La La La" – 3:09
4. "Chinese Whispers" – 4:28
5. "Round and Round" (Jesse Lubitz) – 3:28
6. "Lovely" – 3:51
7. "Song for Frida Kahlo" – 3:41
8. "Another Town" – 3:37
9. "Fitzroy St" (Jesse Lubitz) – 3:53
10. "Every Single Day" – 4:32
11. "Peppercorn Trees" – 3:51
12. "Saudades" – 4:06

== Personnel ==
- Emily Lubitz – vocals, guitar, ukulele
- Jesse Lubitz – guitar, vocals
- Alex Burkoy – violin, mandolin, guitar, bass, ukulele
- Harry Angus – harmonium, piano, whistles, keyboard, percussion, guitar
- Lara, Rita, Lionel and Adam Lubitz – backing vocals

=== Technical personnel ===
- Harry Angus – producer and engineer
- Jesse Lubitz – engineer
- Adam Rhodes – mixing
- Ross Cockle – mastering
- Rachel Stone – cover art
