= Tinpan Orange =

Australian indie folk band

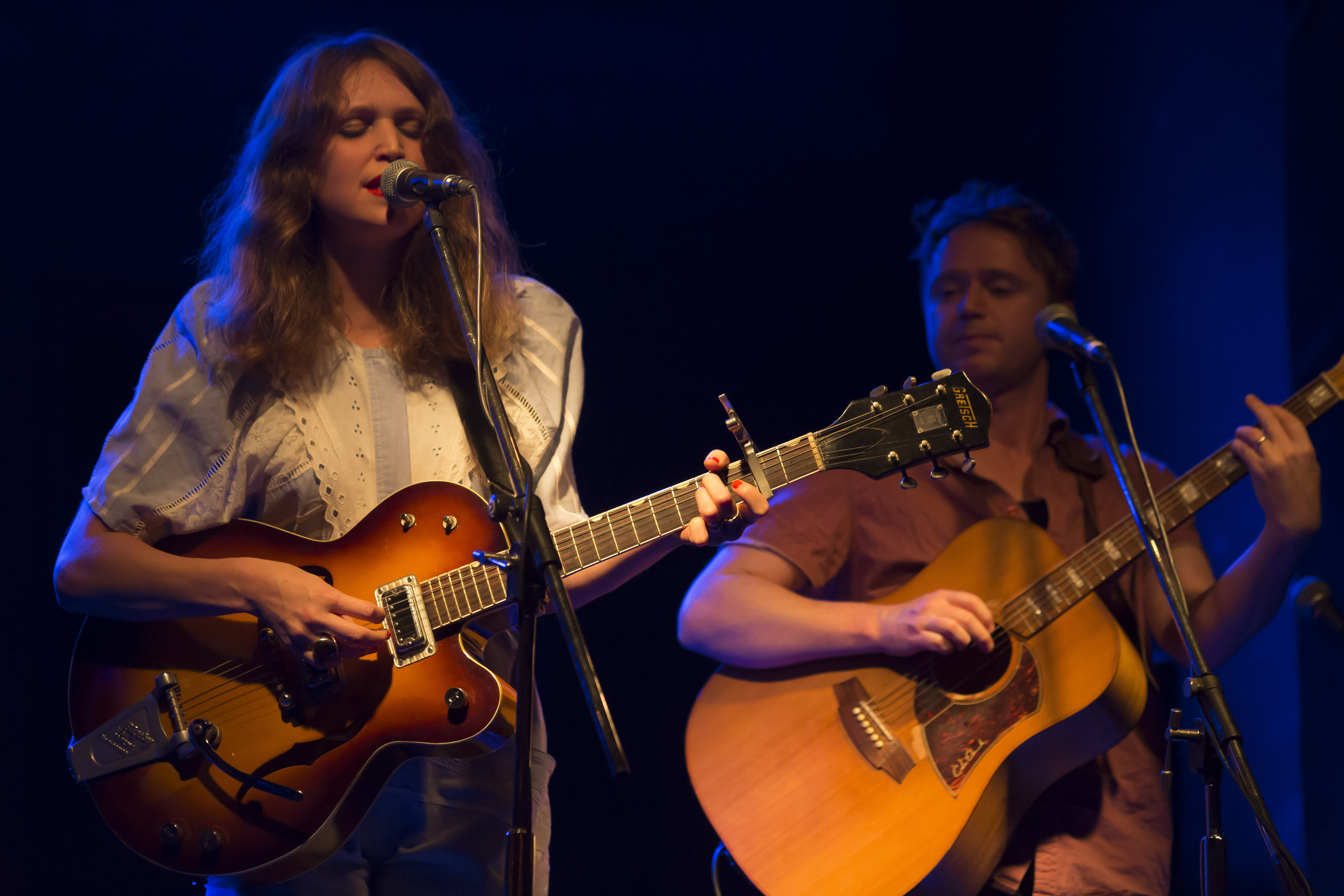
- Tinpan Orange performing in May 2016

Background information
- Origin: Melbourne, Victoria, Australia
- Genre: Indie folk
- Years active: 2005–present
- Label: Vitamin Records
- Members: Emily Lubitz; Jesse Lubitz; Alex Burkoy
- Website: http://www.tinpanorange.com/

Tinpan Orange are an Australian indie folk band from Melbourne. They formed in 2005 after they were discovered busking on the streets of Darwin. The band is a trio of musicians, made up of Emily Lubitz as the lead singer and guitarist, with her brother Jesse Lubitz as guitarist and Alex Burkoy as a violinist. The band's style is heavily stylised folk music, combined with romanticism.

Their debut album, Aroona Palace, features Harry Angus and Ollie McGill of The Cat Empire. Their second album, Death, Love & Buildings features Renee Geyer.

In 2012, lead vocalist Emily Lubitz provided the vocals for Dumb Ways to Die, a public service announcement campaign by Metro Trains Melbourne that quickly became a viral Internet hit, with over 250 million YouTube views. They gained public attention with the release of the single "Barcelona", which received major radio airtime in Australia on Triple J. Their most recent track "Love is a Dog", reached #16 on the AIR Charts, while receiving positive reviews in The Age and The Sydney Morning Herald.

They have been nominated and won music awards in their native Australia, including the Triple J Unearthed award in 2013. To date they have released five albums, including Aroona Palace (2005), Death, Love & Buildings (2007), The Bottom of the Lake (2009), Over the Sun (2012) and Love is a Dog (2016).

== History ==
Tinpan Orange were established in 2005 with three main band members, brother and sister Emily and Jesse Lubitz, with Alex Burkoy on violin. The band released their first album during the same year, with Peter Jones on drums. The album, Aroona Palace, was rereleased in 2009.

The band's second album, Death Love and Buildings was released in 2007, the first to be put out under Vitamin Records. Joel Witenberg replaced Peter Jones on drums and Gidon Symons played bass. Renee Geyer appears in a backing vocal cameo.

In 2009, Tinpan Orange released their third, studio album, The Bottom of the Lake. The album was produced by Harry Angus of The Cat Empire. Tinpan Orange spent the next two years touring extensively.

The Bottom of the Lake was recorded between two home studios in Australia, in Melbourne and in Fairhaven. The album was mixed and mastered by Adam Rhodes and Ross Cockle respectively. Following the release of the album, the first track to be released was titled, "Lovely". The track included Emily Lubitz's vocals, with Alex Burkoy on strings.

They returned with their fourth studio album in 2012, Over the Sun. Prior to the recording of the album, drummer Daniel Farrugia (Missy Higgins, Angus and Julia Stone) joined the band. The album was produced by Steven Schram (Clairy Browne and the Bangin Rackettes, San Cisco) and released on Vitamin Records. The album contained the track "Round the Twist", which was a version of the theme song of children's television show of the same name.

Tinpan Orange won Triple J Unearthed and were nominated for The Age Music Victoria Genre Award for Best Folk/Roots Album for Over the Sun in 2013. During the same year, Emily Lubitz appeared on the popular SBS program RocKwiz, where she sang a Hall and Oates cover duet with Paul Dempsey.

In 2016, their latest album Love is a Dog received coverage by Rolling Stone, listing the track as a first play track on their website. Around the same time, their album also received positive reviews in the Australian media. Notably in the Sydney Morning Herald.

Emily Lubitz' solo EP Begin Again was released in 2022. Her debut solo album Two Black Horses was released in July 2025.

== Members ==
- Emily Lubitz – vocals, guitar
- Jesse Lubitz – guitar, vocals
- Alex Burkoy – violin, mandolin and guitar

== Personal life ==
Emily and Jesse are siblings. Emily has been married to Harry Angus since 2010. They have two children together.

== Discography ==
=== Studio albums ===
- Aroona Palace (2005)
- Death, Love & Buildings (2007)
- The Bottom of the Lake (2009)
- Over the Sun (2012)
- Love Is a Dog (2016)

== Awards and nominations ==
=== Music Victoria Awards ===
The Music Victoria Awards are an annual awards night celebrating Victorian music. They commenced in 2006.

Year	Nominee / work	Award	Result	Ref.
2013	Over the Sun	Best Folk Roots Album	Nominated	
2016	Love Is a Dog	Best Folk Roots Album	Nominated	
