= Over the Sun (Tinpan Orange album) =

Studio album by Tinpan Orange
- Released: September 15, 2012
- Recorded: Soundpark Studios, Melbourne, Australia
- Genre: Country; Indie
- Length: 41:13
- Label: Vitamin Records
- Producer: Steven Schram

Tinpan Orange chronology
The Bottom of the Lake (2009)	Over the Sun (2012)	Love Is a Dog (2016)

Professional ratings
Review scores
Source	Rating
The Age	4/5 stars
Sunday Herald Sun	4/5 stars
Sunday Mail	4/5 stars

Over the Sun is the fourth album by Melbourne folk band Tinpan Orange, released on Vitamin Records in 2012. Its first songs were written in Melbourne, with the rest completed while the band toured in Canada. The album liner notes contained no songwriter credits, although "Round the Twist" was a version of the theme song of the children's television show of the same name.

== Track listing ==
1. "Birdy" – 2:16
2. "Over the Sun" – 3:15
3. "Barcelona" – 3:39
4. "Supergirl" – 4:39
5. "Flowers" – 3:57
6. "Like Snow" – 3:46
7. "Lonely People" – 4:04
8. "Foolish Child" – 3:16
9. "Round the Twist" – 3:17
10. "Lamb" – 3:37
11. "Tattoo on Her Wrist" – 5:23

== Personnel ==
- Emily Lubitz – vocals, guitar
- Jesse Lubitz – guitar, backing vocals
- Alex Burkoy – violin, mandolin, guitar, bass, backing vocals
- Daniel Farrugia – drums
- Harry Angus – keyboards, backing vocals
