= Larry Murray =

Larry Murray may refer to:

- Larry Murray (admiral)
- Larry Murray (baseball)
- Larry Murray (musician)
