= Larry Stephenson =

American singer-songwriter

- Born: Harrisonburg, Virginia
- Genres: Bluegrass music, country music
- Occupation: Musician
- Instrument(s): Mandolin, guitar
- Years active: 1976–present
- Labels: Pinecastle, Webco, Whysper Dream Music, Webco
- Website: larrystephensonband.com

Larry Lee Stephenson is an American singer-songwriter. He sings, plays mandolin, and writes songs in the bluegrass tradition.

== Biography ==
=== Early years ===
Stephenson learned how to play the mandolin as a young boy. At age 13, he recorded a 45 rpm single with his interpretation of the Osborne Brothers' Rocky Top" on one side and Jim & Jesse's "Somebody Loves You Darling" on the flip side.

Stephenson started touring with his father Ed Stephenson in the mid 1970s in Larry Stephenson & the New Grass. He also toured with Cliff Waldron and Leon Morris. Starting in 1979, he toured with Bill Harrell and the Virginians for more than four years. In 1983, he joined the Bluegrass Cardinals.

During this time, he recorded two solo albums: Sweet Sunny South in 1982 and Every Time I Sing A Love Song. He moved close to Nashville in April 1992.

=== The Larry Stephenson Band ===
Stephenson formed the band February 10, 1989. Initially, Marc Keller played guitar, Doug Campbell played bass, and, Rick Allred played banjo. The current lineup is Derek Vaden (banjo), Matt Downing (guitar), and Norbert McGettigan (bass).

=== White House ===
White House was a bluegrass supergroup formed by Stephenson, David Parmley (guitar, lead vocals), Missy Raines (bass), Jason Carter (violin), and Charlie Cushman (banjo). All members are or were residents of White House, Tennessee. They released one album, White House, in 2003.

=== The Bluegrass Band ===
The Bluegrass Band was formed in 1972 by Butch Robins, but disbanded one year later. The band started up again in 1989, this time with members Wayne Henderson (guitar), Ronnie Simpkins (bass), Wyatt Rice (guitar), Arnie Solomon (mandolin), Robins (banjo), Rickie Simpkins (violin, mandolin, vocals), and Stephenson (mandolin, vocals). They recorded four albums that were sold via telemarketing: Once Again From the Top volumes 1 and 2 were traditional bluegrass, and Shine Hallelujah Shine volumes 2 and 2 were traditional gospel.

=== Whysper Dream Music ===
Stephenson and his wife Dreama run their own record label Whysper Dream Music, named after their daughter Falon Whysper. They started the label when Pinecastle temporarily went out of business.

== Awards ==
Stephenson has won numerous Society for the Preservation of Bluegrass Music of America (SPBGMA) awards:

- 2001, 2004, 2005, 2006 & 2008: Male Vocalist of the Year.
- 2005: Song of the Year for "Clinch Mountain Mystery".
- 2006: IBMA Album of the Year for his participation in Celebration of Life: Musicians Against Childhood Cancer.
- 2011: Mandolin Player of the Year.
- 2008: Recorded Event of the Year for his participation in Everett Lilly & Everybody and Their Brother.
- 2010: Recorded Event of the Year for "Give This Message To Your Heart" from his Give This Message to Your Heart: 20th Anniversary album.
- 2015: Album Of The Year for Pull Your Savior In.
- 2016: Vocal Group of the Year.

Stephenson is a member of the Virginia Country Music Hall of Fame (inducted in 1996).

== Discography ==
=== Solo albums ===
- 1982: Sweet Sunny South (Outlet) reissued on Webco in 1999
- 1988: Everytime I Sing a Love Song (Webco)

=== Compilations ===
- 2005: The Webco Years (Pinecastle)

=== As a member of Larry Stephenson and the New Grass ===
- 1976: Best of Bluegrass (Major MRLP 2198)

=== With Cliff Waldron ===
- 1978: God Walks the Dark Hills (Rebel)

=== As a member of Bill Harrell and the Virginians ===
- 1982: Blue Ridge Mountain Boy (Leather)
- 1983: Walking in the Early Morning Dew (Rebel)

=== As a member of The Bluegrass Cardinals ===
- 1984: Home is Where the Heart Is (Sugar Hill)
- 1986: The Shining Path (Sugar Hill)

=== As a member of the Bluegrass Band ===
- 1990: Once Again, from the Top, Vol. 1 (Hay Holler)
- 1990: Once Again, from the Top, Vol. 2 (Hay Holler)
- 1992: Shine Hallelujah Shine Vol 1 (Hay Holler)
- 1992: Shine Hallelujah Shine Vol 2 (Hay Holler)

=== As a member of White House ===
- 2003: White House (Pinecastle)

=== With the Larry Stephenson Band ===
Note: Webco releases listed below have been reissued on Pinecastle

- 1990: Timber (Webco)
- 1991: Can't Stop Myself (Webco)
- 1993: Wash My Blues Away (Webco)
- 1994: Close My Eyes to Heaven (Webco)
- 1994: Born to Sing (Webco)
- 1995: Far Away in Tennessee (Webco)
- 1996: I See God (Webco)
- 1998: On Fire (Pinecastle)
- 2000: Two Hearts on the Borderline (Pinecastle)
- 2001: Heavenward Bound (Pinecastle)
- 2004: Clinch Mountain Mystery (Pinecastle)
- 2006: Life Stories (Pinecastle)
- 2007: Thankful (Pinecastle)
- 2010: Give This Message to Your Heart: 20th Anniversary (Whysper Dream Music)
- 2012: What Really Matters (Whysper Dream Music)
- 2014: Pull Your Savior In (Whysper Dream Music)
- 2017: Weep Little Willow (Whysper Dream Music)

=== Videos ===
- 2007: The Larry Stephenson Band: In Concert at Cypress Gardens DVD (Pinecastle)

=== As primary artist/song contributor ===
- 2003: various artists – Pinecastle Christmas Gathering (Pinecastle) – track 5, "Country Christmas" (with Kristin Scott Benson)
- 2004: various artists – The Essential Bluegrass Christmas Collection: Christmas Time's a Comin' (Time/Life) – track 16, "Away in a Manger"
- 2008: various artists – Bluegrass Tribute to the Stars of Country (Pinecastle) – track 13, "Alone with You"
- 2012: various artists – Life Goes On: Musicians Against Childhood Cancer (Rural Rhythm) – track 17, "I Should've Called"

=== Also appears on ===
- 1996: Bill Emerson – Banjo Man (Pinecastle) – mandolin
- 1999: Jeff Autry – Foothills (Pinecastle) – mandolin, vocals
- 1999: Gary Brewer and the Kentucky Ramblers- Jimmy Martin Songs For Dinner (louisvillemusic.com)
- 2001: David Parmley – What We Leave Behind (Pinecastle) – vocals
- 2005: Aaron McDaris – First Time Around (Pinecastle) – mandolin, vocals
- 2007: John Starling and Carolina Star – Slidin' Home (Rebel) – mandolin, harmony vocals
- 2009: Kristin Scott Benson – Second Season (Pinecastle) – vocals
