= Larry Murray (musician) =

American musician, songwriter and producer (1937–2025)

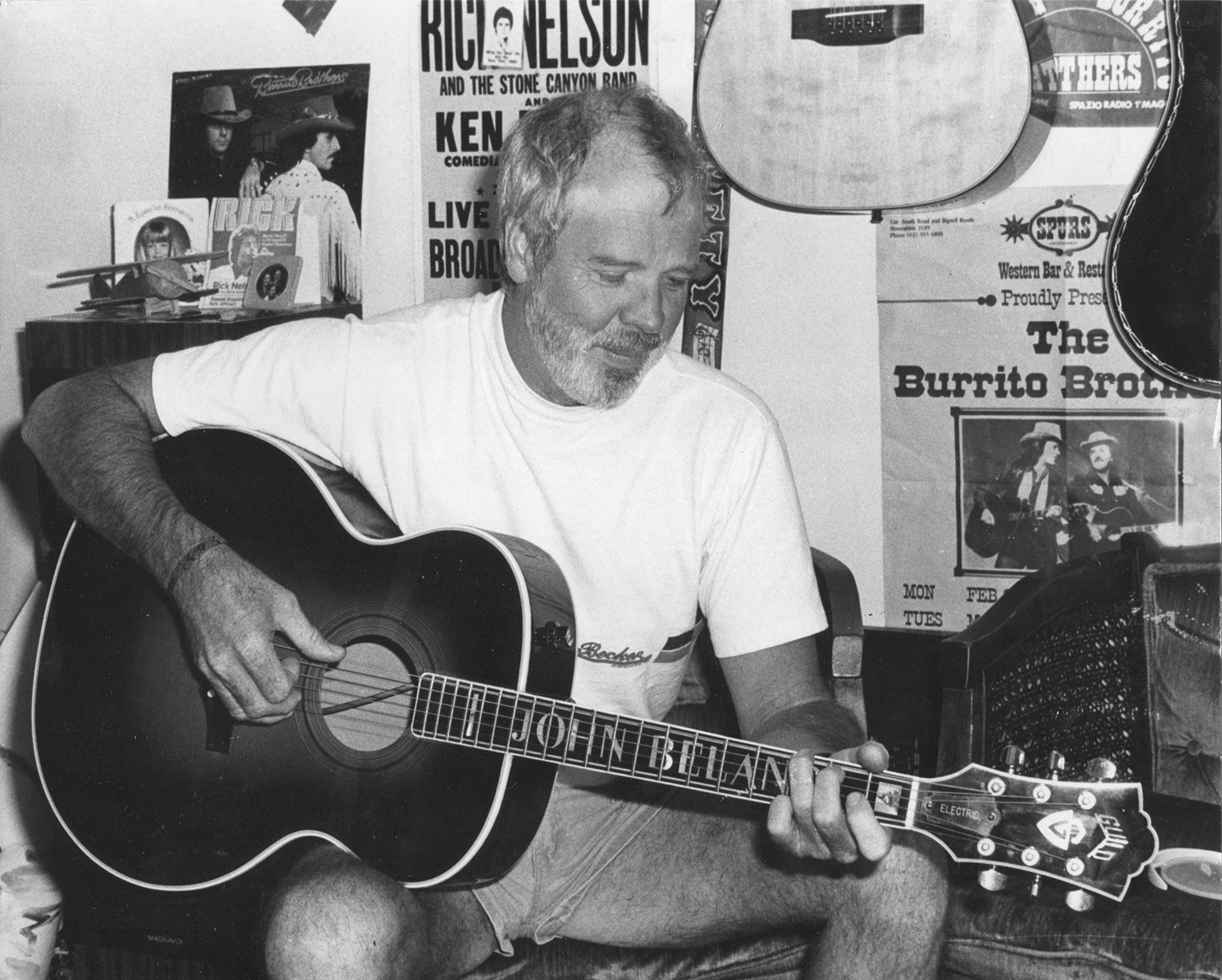

Background information
- Born: February 20, 1937; Waycross, GA
- Died: May 16, 2025 (aged 88)
- Genres: Folk-rock, country, bluegrass
- Instruments: Guitar, dobro, piano
- Labels: Capitol Records, Verve Forecast, MGM Records
- Formerly of: Hearts and Flowers, The Scottsville Squirrel Barkers

Larry Murray (1937–2025) was an American musician, songwriter, and producer known for his influential role in the development of folk-rock music and Country-Rock music and his wide-ranging contributions to television and recorded music. He co-founded the early 1960s folk-bluegrass group The Scottsville Squirrel Barkers—featuring future members of The Byrds and The Eagles—and later formed the pioneering country rock band Hearts and Flowers, which released two albums on Capitol Records. Murray released a solo album, Sweet Country Suite, in 1971 and contributed vocals to The Nitty Gritty Dirt Band’s landmark recording, Will the Circle Be Unbroken. As the host of the Monday night weekly "Hootenanny" open mic shows at the legendary Troubadour Club in Los Angeles, Murray played a key role in supporting the early careers of artists such as Jackson Browne, Jennifer Warnes, Chris Hillman, Linda Ronstadt and Bernie Leadon.

Beyond performing, Murray worked as a writer and music coordinator for The Glen Campbell Goodtime Hour, The Johnny Cash Show, and wrote comedy for The Smothers Brothers Comedy Hour (uncredited) and Hee Haw (uncredited). He co-wrote the screenplay for the film Gospel Road with Johnny Cash and helped form The Highwaymen after producing a Johnny Cash Christmas Special in Switzerland. Murray's songwriting was recorded by a wide range of artists including Johnny Cash, Tommy Cash, Waylon Jennings, Percy Sledge, The Byrds, Olivia Newton-John, and Kris Kristofferson, leaving a lasting legacy across genres and decades. Murray died on May 16, 2025, in Los Angeles at the age of 88.

== Early years ==
Larry Murray was born in Waycross, Georgia in 1937 to Leona Davis Murray and Eddie Larue Murray. When Larry was two years old, he was given to his grandmother, Nora Murray, to be raised on Colquitt Street in a house without electricity in the Deenwood area of Waycross. At the age of nine, following the death of his Grandmother Murray, Larry's aunt, Mamie Murray, took over as caretaker. Soon after, Aunt Mamie lost her home; and, she and Larry rode the train for three years free of charge—because her late husband had been a railroad employee. They traveled the rails from Georgia to South Carolina to Florida, staying with different relatives until they finally returned to Georgia and settled in Blackshear, moving into the Marion Hotel and Boarding House.

To make ends meet, Aunt Mamie cooked food for the Boarding House for rent and got a job in the Blackshear Elementary School lunchroom. Larry lived in the boarding house until he graduated from Blackshear High in 1955. Shortly after graduation Larry enlisted in the U.S. Navy and was stationed in San Diego, California for four years where he served as a diver.

== Early music career ==
After honorable discharge from the Navy in 1961, Murray, along with musician Ed Douglas and famed luthier Yuris Zeltins opened San Diego's legendary music store, The Blue Guitar; a popular hangout where a lot of future major artists gathered in their younger days and was ground zero for the California folk rock and country rock of the 60s and 70s.

Through connections established at the store, Murray and Douglas formed one of San Diego's first bluegrass bands, The Scottsville Squirrel Barkers. Active from 1962 to 1964, the group included Larry Murray on dobro, Bernie Leadon on banjo, Chris Hillman on mandolin, Kenny Wertz on banjo, Ed Douglas on upright bass, with Doug Jeffords and Gary Carr on acoustic guitar. The group recorded only one album, Bluegrass Favorites for Crown Records in 1963.

== Hearts and Flowers (1965–1968) ==
Following the breakup of the Squirell Barkers, Murray moved to Los Angeles and formed Hearts and Flowers, an early pioneering country rock band with Larry on vocals and guitar, David Dawson on vocals, guitar, and autoharp, and Rick Cunha on vocals and guitar, with various musicians like Pete Carr, Karen Carpenter, Jim Keltner and Leland Skylar recruited for live road gigs.

The group released two albums on the Capitol Records label— starting with 1967's Now Is the Time for Hearts and Flowers produced by Nik Venet. The timing of release may have had something to do with the album's struggle to find an audience as it hit stores the same day as The Beatles' record Sgt. Pepper's Lonely Hearts Club Band. In 1968 the group released Of Horses–Kids–and Forgotten Women (with Bernie Leadon replacing Rick Cuhna as a full-time member of the group).

== Solo music career ==
In 1971, Murray recorded a solo country rock album Sweet Country Suite for Verve Forecast / MGM Records. Produced by Murray and Ken Mansfield with the help of J.D. Souther, Buddy Emmons, John McEuen, Jimmy Fadden, John Beland, Gib Guilbeau and others.

== Television and film career ==
When Hearts and Flowers disbanded, Larry went to work as music coordinator and script writer for The Glen Campbell Goodtime Hour and The Johnny Cash Show. He also worked as an uncredited joke writer for The Smothers Brothers Comedy Hour and Hee Haw.

In 1973 Larry and Johnny Cash co-wrote the screenplay for Gospel Road, a movie released by Twentieth Century Fox that told the story of Jesus’ life featuring a country music soundtrack.

In 1983 Larry helped plan and coordinate a Christmas Special for Johnny Cash in Switzerland. Larry invited Waylon Jennings, Willie Nelson and Kris Kristofferson to perform on the show. The Highwaymen was formed at this show and went on tour in 1984.

== Cover versions of Larry Murray songs ==
As a songwriter, Murray's songs have been recorded and performed by The Byrds, Johnny Cash,Tommy Cash, Kris Kristofferson, Rita Coolidge, Gene Parsons, The Flying Burrito Brothers, David Allan Coe, Ricky Nelson, Percy Sledge, Olivia Newton-John, The Dillards, The Bellamy Brothers, Dennis Weaver, The Walker Brothers, Marty Stuart, John Denver, Roger McGuinn, The Cats, Chris Hillman, Bernie Leadon, Chis Robinson, Fayssoux Starling, Doug Jeffords, Randy Scruggs, Johnny Darrell, Lee Conway, Benjamin Tod and The Lost Dog Street Band and many more.

Song title	Artist	Year
Six White Horses	Johnny Cash	1969
Six White Horses	Tommy Cash	1969
Six White Horses	Marty Stuart	2021
Bugler	The Byrds	1971
Bugler	Gene Parsons	2001
Bugler	Fayssoux Starling	2008
Bugler	Doug Jeffords	2010
Bugler	Randy Scruggs	1972
Hard To Be Friends	Kris Kristofferson and Rita Coolidge	1973
Hard To Be Friends	Percy Sledge	1974
Hard To Be Friends	The Walker Brothers	1976
Hard To Be Friends	Johnny Darrell	1978
Hard To Be Friends	The Cats	1975
Be My Day	The Cats	1974
Dakota	Kris Kristofferson and Rita Coolidge	1974
Dakota	David Alan Coe	1976
The Lights Of Magdala	Johnny Cash	1973
The Lights Of Magdala	June Carter Cash	1973
The Lights Of Magdala	Kris Kristofferson	1974
The Lights Of Magdala	The Dillards	1979
Bound To Explode	The Bellamy Brothers	1977
Gun Man’s Code	The Dillards	1977
Gun Man’s Code	Lee Conway	1975
Mama Lou	Rita Coolidge	1974
Mama Lou	Lee Conway	1975
I’ll Bet You A Kangaroo	Olivia Newton-John	1976
I’ll Bet You A Kangaroo	Lee Conway	1999
I’ll Bet You A Kangaroo	John Denver	1978

== Awards and recognition ==
Murray is featured in the Country Music Hall of Fame's major exhibit “Western Edge: The Roots and Reverberations of Los Angeles Country-Rock.”

In 1970, Tommy Cash took Murray's song Six White Horses to #4 on the U.S. country singles chart, and #1 in Canada.

Be My Day – Performed by the Dutch band The Cats, became a #1 hit in the Netherlands in 1974.

Gold Record presented by RCA Victor Records (Australia) in recognition of sales in excess of 50,000 copies for the self-titled album Digby Richards, produced by Larry Murray.

== Discography ==
As a musician:

- Bluegrass Favorites – The Scottsville Squirrel Barkers (Crown Records, 1963)
- Now Is The Time For Hearts and Flowers - Hearts and Flowers (Capitol Records, 1967)
- Of Horses–Kids–and Forgotten Women – Hearts and Flowers (Capitol Records, 1968)
- Sweet Country Suite – Larry Murray (Verve Forecast / MGM Records, 1971)
- Wheels - Tribute To Gram Parsons And Clarence White – Various Artists (Appaloosa, 1989)

As a producer:

- Goodnight Everybody – Mary McCaslin (Barnaby Records, 1969)
- Troublemaker – Johnny Darrell (United Artists Records, 1969)
- Headed For The Country – Swampwater (RCA Victor, 1971)
- Sweet Country Suite – Larry Murray (Verve Forecast / MGM Records, 1971)
- Gypsy Moth – Stephen Ambrose (Barnaby Records, 1972)
- Severin Browne – Severin Browne (Motown, 1973)
- New Improved Severin Browne – Severin Browne (Motown, 1974)
- Digby Richards – Digby Richards (RCA Victor, 1974)
- Lee Conway – Lee Conway (Image, 1975)
- Love Still Makes The World Go Round – Lee Conway (Emerald Gem, 1976)
- Lay A Little Loving On Me – Lee Conway (BBC Radioplay Music, 1977)
- Growing Pains – Max Merritt (Avenue Records, 1982)
