= Hearts & Flowers =

American folk rock club band

Hearts and Flowers
- Years active: 1965–1968
- Label: Capitol Records
- Past members: Rick Cunha, David Dawson, Bernie Leadon, Larry Murray,

Hearts and Flowers was an American, Los Angeles-based band that pioneered Folk Rock and Country Rock Music of The 1960s and 1970s. Perhaps most significant as the group that launched the career of Eagles' founding member and guitarist-songwriter, Bernie Leadon. The line-up included Larry Murray (vocals, guitar), Dave Dawson (vocals, guitar, autoharp), and Rick Cunha (vocals, guitar). Bernie Leadon (guitar, vocals).

== Career ==
The individual members met at the ongoing Monday night jam sessions (referred to as the Hootenanny, or "Hoot") being held at The Troubador over which Murray presided. Cunha and Dawson, who played in a duo, were newcomers as recent transplants to the area from Hawaii. After a few informal picking sessions, the trio gelled and started performing.

"We had a unique sound, a very strange sound, particularly because we found what we did best was old, traditional, country hillbilly music, Murray told John Einarson. "That became the core of what we did, the three of us, and we took it from there."

The group's sound was described as "Merle Haggard-meets-Sgt. Pepper" as a result of the wide-ranging influences each member brought to Hearts & Flowers. This included the aforementioned Haggard, plus Buck Owens, The Louvin Brothers, The Everly Brothers, The Country Gentlemen, The Beatles, and Bob Dylan. With such unorthodox influences—plus the fact that the band featured autoharp—the group was torn about the direction it wanted to take. "Had it been up to us, we would have gone way country," said Cunha. "We wanted it to be commercial and fit into the pop market, but left to our own devices it would have been even more country. Production changed what we would have done."

Meanwhile, Hearts & Flowers was influencing local musicians, who heard them in various folk clubs around the Los Angeles area. This included several people who would later be credited with developing the then-germinating Southern California country-rock sound. Jim Messina (Buffalo Springfield, Poco, Loggins and Messina) says, "Those three guys were probably the closest thing to what we were all flowing into. They were the cutting edge of where the rest of us were going. They were the black that didn't quite have the edge sharped on it yet. I got my first Telecaster from Rick Cunha."

The group signed a deal with Capitol Records' Folk World label in December 1966. Once in the studio, the trio was filled out with studio musicians and steered into a more folk direction. On the road, the group would be augmented with an ever-changing series of musicians including Terry Paul (Kris Kristofferson), Pete Carr (The Hour Glass), and Karen Carpenter (The Carpenters).

Tensions over the direction of the group eventually came to a head. Cunha left the group in late 1967 to write country music and produce.

The group's second record was titled Of Horses, Kids, & Forgotten Women, released by Capital and was produced by Nik Venet (also responsible for work by the Beach Boys, the Stone Poneys, Fred Neil and many others). Leadon replaced Cunha for the second album in 1968. Leadon was well known to Murray as they had played in The Scottsville Squirrel Barkers, a San Diego bluegrass group responsible for launching both those members' careers, as well as those of Chris Hillman and Kenny Wertz.

Among venues they played during the mid-1960s, were Los Angeles clubs Ledbetter's, Doug Weston's Troubadour, the Whisky a Go Go, and the Ash Grove, primarily as an opening act. Some of the groups with whom they shared a bill included the Doors, Bill Monroe, Buffalo Springfield, and Blue Cheer. After recording two albums without major success, the group disbanded in 1968.

Murray claims the group was "in a rut" and each member was working with other, different musicians. "But for a simple twist of fate, we could have been huge. We had what it took, we had a lot of charisma, the personality of the group was amazing. But I don't think we were focused business-wise. We tended to go with losers, because they were less high-pressure, and we dodged the real pressure people whose asses we should have been kissing. But you do what you do. Everything we did seemed like a good idea at the time."

The break-up of the band came just prior to the release of the seminal country-rock album by the Byrds, Sweetheart of the Rodeo, and the subsequent formation of the Flying Burrito Brothers, both of which are credited with popularizing the genre.

== Discography ==
- Now Is the Time for Hearts and Flowers – 1967
- Of Horses, Kids and Forgotten Women – 1968
- The Complete Hearts and Flowers Collection (compilation) – 2003
