= Troubadour (West Hollywood, California) =

Nightclub in the United States

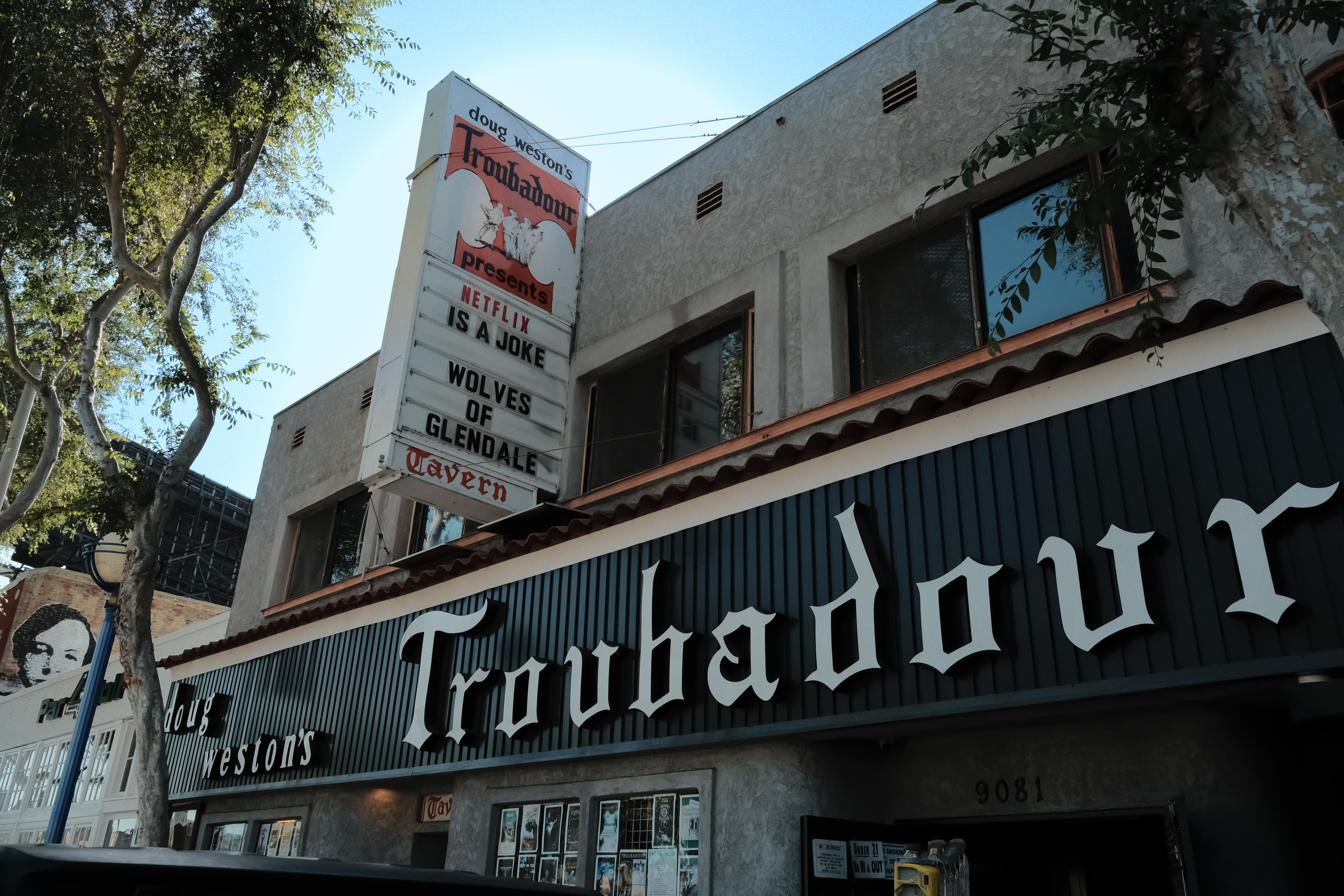
- Exterior of the Troubadour in 2026
- Interactive map of Troubadour
- Location: 9081 Santa Monica Boulevard, West Hollywood, California
- Coordinates: 34.08138°N 118.389399°W
- Seating type: standing
- Capacity: 500
- Type: Nightclub
- Events: Folk, singer-songwriters, rock, heavy metal

Construction
- Opened: 1957

Website
- https://www.troubadour.com

The Troubadour is a nightclub located in West Hollywood, California, United States, at 9081 Santa Monica Boulevard just east of Doheny Drive and the border of Beverly Hills. Inspired by a visit to the newly opened Troubadour café in London, it was opened in the 1950s by Doug Weston in a 65-seat coffee house on La Cienega Boulevard, in 1957 it moved to its current location which seats 300. It was a major center for folk music in the 1960s, and subsequently for singer-songwriters and rock. In 2011, a documentary about the club, Troubadours: Carole King / James Taylor & The Rise of the Singer-Songwriter, was released.

== History ==
=== 1960s ===
The Troubadour played an important role in the careers of Hoyt Axton, Jackson Browne, the Byrds, Neil Diamond, Elton John, the Eagles, Carole King, Love, Joni Mitchell, Van Morrison, Bonnie Raitt, Linda Ronstadt, JD Souther, James Taylor, Tom Waits, and other prominent and successful performers, who played performances there establishing their future fame.

In October 1962, comedian Lenny Bruce was arrested on obscenity charges for using the word "schmuck" on stage; one of the arresting officers was Sherman Block, who would later become Los Angeles County Sheriff. Michael Nesmith sometimes worked as an M.C. at the club in the 1960s, before the formation of the music group the Monkees. Randy Newman started out at the Troubadour, as did Buffalo Springfield, who debuted at the club in 1966.

A popular tradition at the club in the early 1960s was the Monday night Hootenanny or "Hoot" as it was commonly called; an open-mic show where many future notables got their start. Hosted by Hearts and Flowers member Larry Murray, the Hoot nights were described by Linda Ronstadt as "If you want to make yourself known, you'd go to the open-mic."

=== 1970s ===
On August 25, 1970, Neil Diamond (who had just recorded his first live album at the Troubadour) introduced Elton John, who performed his first show in the United States at the Troubadour. Comics Cheech & Chong and Steve Martin were discovered there in the early 1970s. In 1972, Peter Yarrow, Lazarus played in April and Carly Simon, Harry Chapin, Bill Withers, Randy Newman, and Melanie played in May. In 1974, John Lennon, Harry Nilsson and Ringo Starr were ejected from the club for drunkenly heckling the Smothers Brothers. The same year, Bruce Springsteen and the E-Street Band performed third on the bill with ex-Byrd Roger McGuinn headlining, going on stage at 1:45 in the morning. In 1975, Elton John returned to do a series of special anniversary concerts. In November 2007, James Taylor and Carole King played a series of concerts commemorating the nightclub's 50th anniversary and reuniting the two from their 1970 performance.

The Troubadour featured new wave and punk in the late 1970s and early 1980s, including Bad Religion, Flipper, The Meat Puppets, Napalm Death, and Redd Kross. L.A. residents and proto-grunge band Melvins have played the Troubador numerous times, including live tapings for Carson Daly in 2012 and 2015. The club features in the 1972 film Cisco Pike.

=== 1980s/1990s ===
In the 1980s the club became associated with glam metal bands such as Candy, Cinderella, Razor Fury, Guns N' Roses, L.A. Guns, Mötley Crüe, AlleyBrat, Poison, Ratt, Warrant and W.A.S.P. Guns N' Roses played their first show at the Troubadour, and were also discovered by a David Geffen A&R representative at the club. It continued to attract non-glam metal acts through this time and into the 1990s such as Fiona Apple, Steve Earle, Mudhoney, the Red Hot Chili Peppers, Silverchair and Radiohead. Incubus would intercut live footage from their performance at the club on February 25, 1995, into the video for their single "Take Me to Your Leader" in 1996.

=== 21st century ===
In the 21st century, the venue is well known for promoting artists as diverse as Arctic Monkeys, Bastille, Billy Talent, Jason Mraz, Coldplay, Franz Ferdinand, Kina Grannis, Ray LaMontagne, Lawson, the Libertines, Melt Banana, Metz, Joanna Newsom, and Orville Peck. Rise Against filmed at the club five nights in a row for a DVD, Generation Lost. Before BTS hit international superstardom, they performed a free, surprise concert at the venue in July 2014 as part of a challenge they completed for the reality show American Hustle Life. On April 1, 2016, it hosted the first show of Guns N' Roses since Slash and Duff McKagan had rejoined the band. Busted's first show as a reformed band in America was performed at the Troubadour in June 2017. The first concert of Grace VanderWaal's first national tour was held at the Troubadour on November 5, 2017. Stone Temple Pilots' first live performance with their newest singer Jeff Gutt was held in November 2017.

Like many small businesses and music venues, the Troubadour struggled during the COVID-19 pandemic; it launched a GoFundMe page in May 2020, which raised $70,000. In August, Elton John celebrated his 50th anniversary of playing the venue, and expressed his concern about the survival of the nightclub. The comedian Bill Burr hosted two of his Monday Morning Podcasts from the venue to raise money during the pandemic by selling limited edition signed posters. On August 19, 2025, the Canadian pop artist Carly Rae Jepsen played a special show at the Troubadour to celebrate the tenth anniversary of her album Emotion.
