= The Other Side (Chris Hillman album) =

Studio album by Chris Hillman
- Released: June 21, 2005
- Recorded: January 2005
- Genre: Country
- Label: Sovereign Artists
- Producer: Herb Pedersen

Chris Hillman chronology
Like a Hurricane (1998)	The Other Side (2005)

Professional ratings
Review scores
Source	Rating
AllMusic	4/5 stars

The Other Side is a Chris Hillman album, released in 2005. It contains a countryfied version of The Byrds 1966 single, "Eight Miles High."

== Track listing ==
1. "Eight Miles High" (Clark, Crosby, McGuinn) – 4:05
2. "True Love" (Hill, Hillman) – 2:23
3. "Drifting" (Hill, Hillman) – 3:22
4. "The Other Side" (Hill, Hillman) – 3:04
5. "Heaven Is My Home" (Hill, Hillman) – 2:23
6. "Touch Me" (Hill, Hillman) – 3:55
7. "The Wheel" (Hill, Hillman) – 3:14
8. "True He's Gone" (Sullivan) – 4:28
9. "Heavenly Grace" (Hill, Hillman) – 2:44
10. "It Doesn't Matter" (Hill, Hillman, Stills) – 3:01
11. "Missing You" (Hillman, Russell, Sellers) – 3:56
12. "The Water Is Wide" – (4:33)
13. "I Know I Need You" (Hill, Hillman) – 3:10
14. "Our Savior's Hands" (Hill, Hillman) – 4:24

A 15th track, "Old Rockin' Chair" was briefly available as a bonus track on the downloadable version of the CD. It hasn't been made available ever since.

== Personnel ==
- Chris Hillman – guitar, mandolin, vocals
- Bill Bryson – bass
- Skip Edwards – accordion
- Larry Park – guitar
- Herb Pedersen – 5-string banjo, banjo, guitar, rhythm guitar, vocal harmony, background vocals
- Sally Van Meter – dobro
- Jennifer Warnes – harmony, vocal harmony, vocals
- Gabe Witcher – fiddle

=== Production ===
- Steve Hall – mastering
- Richard Aaron – photography
- Scott MacPherson – engineer, mixing
- Mark Matthews – assistant engineer, session photographer
- Scott McPherson – audio engineer
