= Love Is a Dog =

Studio album by Tinpan Orange
- Released: 2016
- Studio: Sing Sing Studios, Melbourne; Garden Sound Studios
- Genre: Folk
- Producer: Tinpan Orange, Harry James Angus

Tinpan Orange chronology
Over the Sun (2012)	Love Is a Dog (2016)

Love Is a Dog is the fifth album by Melbourne indie-folk band Tinpan Orange, released on Vitamin Records in April 2016. The album was partially funded by a Pozible campaign which exceeded their goal of $15,000.

== Details ==
The title is a reference to the Charles Bukowski poetry collection, Love Is a Dog from Hell.

Singer Emily Lubitz said two of the songs were inspired by The Great Gatsby. "'Rich Man' is Tom Buchanan and Daisy: super wealthy; they have it all but ... it's empty. 'Light Across the Water' is the beacon at the end of their jetty: the unattainable promise of perfect love."

A number of the songs were written or co-written by Emily Lubitz' partner Harry James Angus.

== Reception ==
The Age said, "the band have honed their indie-folk offerings to produce their most cohesive work yet. With its simple acoustic palette and intimate arrangements, it's tempting to call this a stripped back album; but where there's less clutter, there's more space, and though there are fewer hooks, there's more finesse."

Rolling Stone Australia said, "there’s a more ambiguous approach, as they frequently aim for deeper, more flexibly interpretable tales that showcase some of the band’s most confident songwriting to date, making for a strikingly assured album".

== Track listing ==
No.	Title	Writer(s)	Length
1.	"Rich Man"	Emily Lubitz; Harry James Angus; Jesse Lubitz	3.27
2.	"Cities of Gold"	E. Lubitz; Angus	3.56
3.	"Love Is a Dog"	E. Lubitz	3.18
4.	"Lucky One"	E. Lubitz	3.20
5.	"Cabarita"	Angus	3.31
6.	"Fools and Cowboys"	E. Lubitz	3.36
7.	"Diary"	Angus	4.11
8.	"Hear from Me"	E. Lubitz; Angus	3.33
9.	"Light Across the Water"	E. Lubitz	3.39
10.	"Ordinary Lives"	J. Lubitz	3.34
11.	"Leopards"	E. Lubitz	4.38

== Personnel ==
- Jesse Lubitz – guitar, vocals
- Emily Lubitz – vocals
- Alex Burkoy – violin, guitar
- Harry James Angus – keyboard, guitar, vocals
- Jules Pascoe – bass
- Danny Pascoe – drums
