= Gospel Road: A Story of Jesus =

- Theatrical release poster
- Directed by: Robert Elfstrom
- Written by: Johnny Cash; Larry Murray
- Produced by: June Carter Cash; Johnny Cash
- Starring: Johnny Cash; Robert Elfstrom; June Carter Cash; Larry Lee; Paul L. Smith; Alan Dater
- Cinematography: Robert Elfstrom; Tom McDonough
- Edited by: John Craddock
- Production company: 20th Century Fox
- Distributed by: 20th Century Fox
- Release date: March 31, 1973
- Running time: 93 minutes
- Country: United States
- Language: English

Gospel Road: A Story of Jesus is a 1973 American drama film directed by Robert Elfstrom and written by Johnny Cash and Larry Murray. The film stars Johnny Cash, Robert Elfstrom, June Carter Cash, Larry Lee, Paul L. Smith and Alan Dater. The film was released on March 31, 1973, by 20th Century Fox. Singer-songwriter Larry Gatlin also appears in the film and his song "Help Me" (here shortened to "Help") is performed in several sections throughout the film. Cash released a soundtrack album to accompany the film.

== Plot ==
The movie depicts the story of Jesus, from life to death with resurrection on location in Israel, as narrated (and sung) by Cash.

== Cast ==
- Johnny Cash as himself
- Robert Elfstrom as Jesus Christ
- June Carter Cash as Mary Magdalene
- Larry Lee as John the Baptist
- Paul L. Smith as Peter
- Alan Dater as Nicodemus
- Robert Elfstrom Jr. as young Jesus
- Gelles LaBlanc as John
- Terrence Winston Mannock as Matthew
- Thomas Leventhal as Judas Iscariot
- John Paul Kay as James the Elder
- Sean Armstrong as Thomas
- Lyle Nicholson as Andrew
- Steven Chernoff as Philip
- Stuart Stark as Nathaniel
- Ulf Pollack as Thaddeus
- Jonathan Sanders as Simon
