= David Parmley =

American singer-songwriter (born 1959)

- Born: David L. Parmley; February 1, 1959 (age 67); White House, Tennessee, U.S.
- Genres: Bluegrass music
- Occupation: Musician
- Instrument: Guitar
- Years active: 1974–present
- Label: Pinecastle
- Website: davidparmley.com

David L. Parmley (born February 1, 1959) is a bluegrass vocalist, guitarist, and award-winning bandleader. He is best known for being a co-founder of both the Bluegrass Cardinals and Continental Divide.

== Biography ==
Parmley was born in White House, Tennessee, but grew up in Los Angeles, California. His father Don Parmley was an esteemed bluegrass banjoist.

=== Bluegrass Cardinals ===
In 1974, Parmley began playing bluegrass professionally at age 17, singing lead vocals and playing guitar with his father Don and mandolinist Randy Graham in the Bluegrass Cardinals. In 1991, Parmley left the Bluegrass Cardinals and moved to Nashville to pursue a solo career in country music.

=== Continental Divide ===
In 1994, Parmley formed David Parmley, Scott Vestal and Continental Divide with Scott Vestal (banjo), Rickie Simpkins (fiddle), Jimmy Bowen (mandolin), Mike Anglin (bass), and Randy Kohrs (resonator guitar). In 1995, they released David Parmley, Scott Vestal & Continental Divide album (Pinecastle). Also in 1995, Continental Divide won the IBMA award for Emerging Artist of the Year.

1996, Continental Divide released the On the Divide album for Pinecastle Records. Personnel included Parmley, Anglin, Vestal, Bowen, Aubrey Haynie (mandolin, fiddle), and Larry Atamanuik (percussion).

In 1998, Vestal departed the band. The band name was changed to Continental Divide, and then David Parmley and Continental Divide.

In 2001, Continental Divide released What We Leave Behind and in 2002, they released Pathway of Time with Parmley, Anglin, Ben Greene (banjo), Danny Barnes (mandolin, vocals), and Steve Day (fiddle, vocals). Giest artists included Jim Hurst (guitar) and Glen Duncan (fiddle).

The Long Time Coming album was released in 2005. The lineup included Randy Graham (mandolin), Dale Perry (banjo), Barry Berrier (bass), and Steve Day (fiddle).

In 2007, they released “Church House Hymns” album, and in 2008, the 3 Silver Dollars album with the title track composed by Tom T. and Dixie Hall. The band included Parmley, Perry (banjo, vocals), Ron Spears (mandolin, vocals), Ron Stewart (fiddle), and Kyle Perkins (bass). Rhonda Vincent provided harmony vocals on "Meadow On The Mountain."

In 2008, Parmley took a hiatus from performing because of health problems, but in 2010, he returned to performing with Continental Divide, releasing the album There'll Always Be A Rocking Chair. Only Parmley and Anglin remained from the original lineup. Burchett Jr. (banjo), Danny Barnes (mandolin), Steve Day (fiddle), and Glen Duncan (fiddle).

Then in 2012, Parmley retired from music, driving and maintaining tour buses for music artists, such as Rascal Flatts.

=== Cardinal Tradition ===
Parmley resumed performing and touring in 2015 with his new band Cardinal Tradition. Besides David on guitar, the band includes Ron Spears, (mandolin), Steve Day (fiddle), Dale Perry (banjo), and John Marquess (bass).

=== Other projects ===
In 1989, Parmley released his first solo project I Know a Good Thing on Sugar Hill Records and in 1993, he released Southern Heritage on Rebel Records.

After Don and David Parmley left the Bluegrass Cardinals in 1991, they recorded the album Parmley and McCoury: Families of Tradition with Del McCoury (and his sons Ron and Robbie).

In 2002, Parmley, Larry Stephenson, Missy Raines, Jason Carter, and Charlie Cushman formed a part-time band called White House (all members of this band from White House, Tennessee).

=== Awards ===
Parmley won the International Bluegrass Music Association Recorded Event of the Year award in 1991 and 1995.

== Discography ==
=== Solo recordings ===
- 1989: I Know A Good Thing (Sugar Hill)
- 1993: Southern Heritage (Rebel)

=== The Bluegrass Cardinals ===
- 1976: The Bluegrass Cardinals (Sierra Briar)
- 1977: Welcome to Virginia (Rounder)
- 1978: Livin' in the Good Old Days (CMH)
- 1979: Cardinal Soul (CMH)
- 1980: Sunday Mornin' Singin' (CMH)
- 1980: 'Live' & On Stage! With Special Guests (CMH)
- 1981: Where Rainbows Touch Down (CMH)
- 1981: On Stage in Nashville (BGC)
- 1983: Cardinal Class (Sugar Hill)
- 1984: Home is Where the Heart Is (Sugar Hill)
- 1986: The Shining Path (Sugar Hill)
- 1990: New and Old Favorites (BGC)

=== Parmley and McCoury ===
- 1991: Parmley & McCoury: Families of Tradition (BGC)

=== David Parmley, Scott Vestal, and Continental Divide ===
- 1995: David Parmley, Scott Vestal and Continental Divide (Pinecastle)
- 1996: On the Divide (Pinecastle)
- 1998: Feel Good Day (Pinecastle)

=== White House ===
- 2003: White House (Pinecastle)

=== David Parmley and Continental Divide ===
- 2000: There'll Always Be A Rocking Chair (Pinecastle)
- 2002: Pathway of Time (Pinecastle)
- 2005: Long Time Coming (CMH)
- 2008: Church House Hymns (Volume I) (Pinecastle)
- 2010: 3 Silver Dollars (Pinecastle)
- 2012: Church House Hymns (Volume II) (Pinecastle)

=== David Parmley and the Cardinal Tradition ===
- 2016: David Parmley and the Cardinal Tradition (self-released)

=== As composer ===
- 2015: Flatt Lonesome - Runaway Train (Mountain Home) - track 5, "Don't Come Running" (co-written with Don Parmley)

=== As producer ===
- 1996: New Vintage - Sands of Time (Pinecastle)

=== Also appears on ===
- 1978: Fred Geiger - Fred Geiger (Ridge Runner)
- 1982: Jerry Douglas - Fluxedo (Rounder)
- 1982: Claire Lynch - Breakin' It (Ambush)
- 1982: Larry Stephenson - Sweet Sunny South (Outlet)
- 1988: Larry Stephenson - Everytime I Sing a Love Song (Webco)
- 1991: Rhonda Vincent - New Dreams and Sunshine (Rebel)
- 2000: Béla Fleck - Natural Bridge (Rounder)
- 2003: Larry Stephenson Band - Clinch Mountain Mystery (Pinecastle)
