= Bluegrass Cardinals =

American bluegrass band

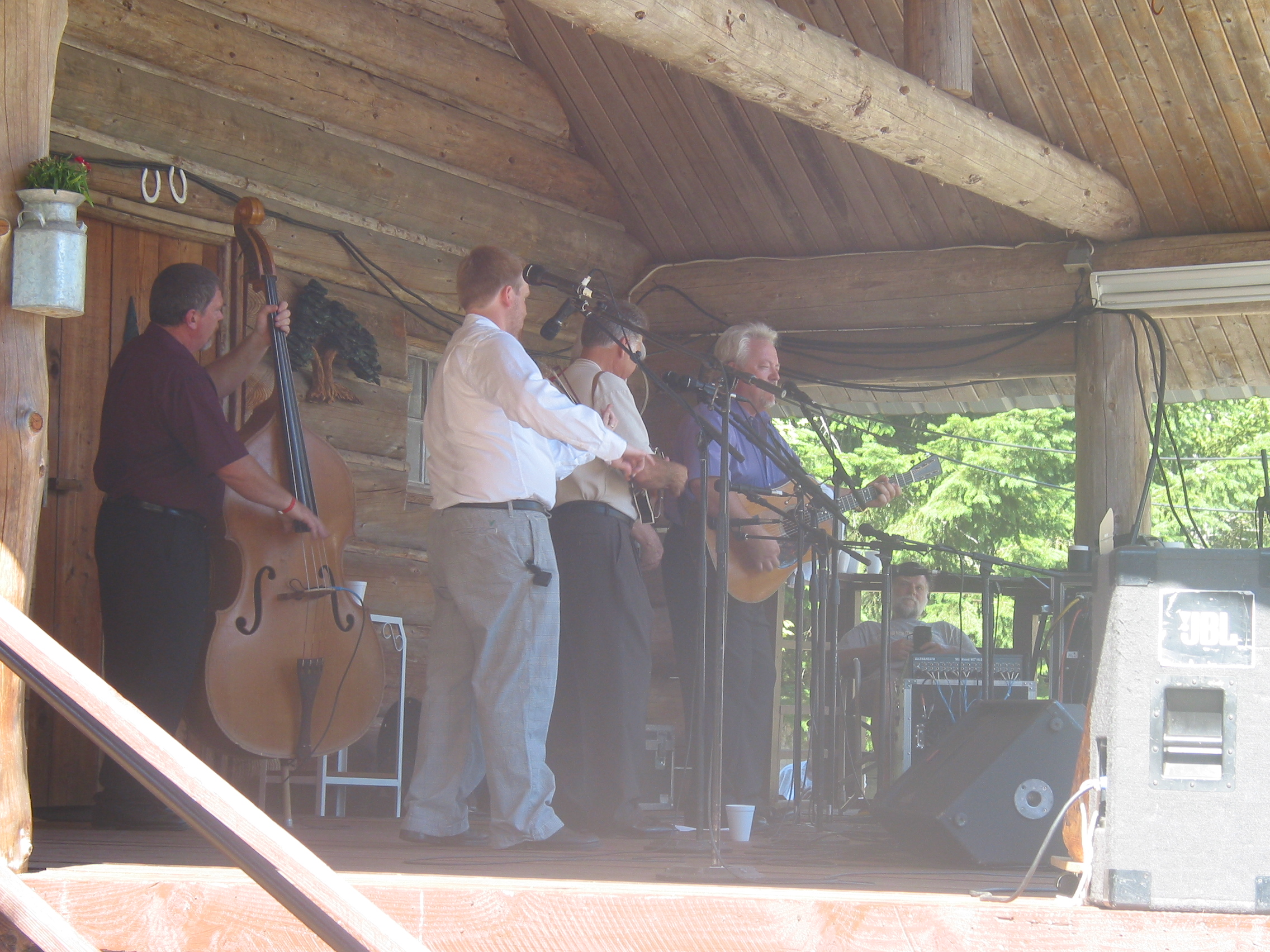
- The Bluegrass Cardinals playing a reunion show at the Darrington Bluegrass Festival in 2006. Unknown members pictured.

Background information
- Genres: Bluegrass
- Years active: 1974–1997
- Labels: CMH Records, Sierra Records, Rounder Records, Copper Creek Records
- Past members: Don Parmley (founder); Randy Graham (original member); David Parmley (original member); Dennis Fetchet; Bill Bryson; Larry Stephenson; Don Rigsby

The Bluegrass Cardinals were a Bluegrass band from Los Angeles, California. The group is credited with being the first bluegrass band to record bluegrass gospel in a cappella. Founded in 1974, the Bluegrass Cardinals disbanded in 1997 when founding member Don Parmley announced his retirement from music.

The band were inducted into the International Bluegrass Music Hall of Fame in 2025.

== History ==
The Bluegrass Cardinals were formed by Don Parmley in 1974. Parmley was a member of The Hillmen before forming the group, playing alongside members Vern Gosdin and Chris Hillman. Parmley was working as a musician for the television show The Beverly Hillbillies and is credited with all banjo work on the show except for the intro theme song. Hillman had moved on from The Hillmen, finding success with the group The Byrds. The original group was formed with Parmley, Randy Graham, and Parmley's 15 year old son David Parmley.

The group released its first album in 1976, shortly after moving from southern California to Virginia. The self-titled album was released on Copper Creek Records label. They released their second album, Welcome to Virginia, on Rounder Records in 1977. The group went through numerous lineup changes and the years included members Dennis Fetchet, Bill Bryson, and Larry Stephenson.

The Bluegrass Cardinals released numerous more albums throughout the 1970s and early 1980s, all of which were on the CMH Records label. It also made numerous appearances on the Grand Ole Opry. They recorded three additional albums in the 1980s under the Sugar Hill Records label. The group stopped performing for a short time in 1991 after Don and David left to record an album with Del McCoury. David would never return to the Bluegrass Cardinals, pursuing a solo career as a musician instead, co-founding the group Continental Divide in 1992.

The Bluegrass Cardinals eventually disbanded in 1997 when Don Parmley left the group. CMH released a collection of the group's music in 2002. Entitled The Essential Bluegrass Cardinals, the album was put together by David Parmley. Following the release, the group performed several reunion shows at various locations in the United States.

== Discography ==
=== Albums ===
Title	Details
The Bluegrass Cardinals	Released: 1976; Label: Copper Creek; Format: Album
Welcome to Virginia	Released: 1977; Label: Rounder Records; Format: LP, Cassette
Livin' in the Good Old Days	Released: 1978; Label: CMH Records; Format: LP, Cassette
Cardinal Soul	Released: 1979; Label: CMH Records; Format: Vinyl, LP, Album
Sunday Mornin' Singin'	Released: 1980; Label: CMH Records; Format: Vinyl, LP, Album
Where Rainbows Touch Down	Released: 1981; Label: CMH Records; Format: Vinyl, LP, Album
Cardinal Class	Released: 1983; Label: Sugar Hill Records; Format: Vinyl, LP, Album
Home Is Where the Heart Is	Released: 1984; Label: Sugar Hill Records; Format: Vinyl, LP, Album
The Shining Path	Released: 1986; Label: Sugar Hill Records; Format: Vinyl, LP, Album
The Essential Bluegrass Cardinals	Released: 2002; Label: CMH Classic Bluegrass, division of CMH Records; Format: CD, Compilation
