= Aroona Palace =

Studio album by Tinpan Orange
- Released: August 8, 2005
- Label: self released

Aroona Palace is the debut album by Melbourne band Tinpan Orange. It was recorded at Sing Sing Studios and Aroona Palace, and was self released in 2005. It was rereleased on 9 April 2009 due to popular demand.

== Track listing ==
1. "Waterfall" - 4:15
2. "Worthy" - 4:33
3. "Passing Time" - 4:00
4. "House on My Belly" - 4:45
5. "Wait of the World" - 3:46
6. "Beatific" - 3:01
7. "Sleep Away" - 4:20
8. "Girls Blues" - 4:10
9. "Lost and Found" - 3:40
10. "Angel Lily Princess Girl" - 3:50
11. "Untitled" - 0:16
12. "Song for Jane" - 4:56
13. "Dance Me to the End of Love" - 4:10

== Personnel ==
=== Band members ===
- Emily Lubitz – vocals, guitar
- Jesse Lubitz – guitar, vocals
- Alex Burkoy - violin, mandolin, guitar
- Peter Jones - drums, percussion

=== Technical staff ===
- Jimi Maroudas - producer and engineer
- Tony "Jack the Bear" Mantz - mastering
- Victor Holder - photography, artwork
- Lia Gery - photography
