= The Scottsville Squirrel Barkers =

US musical group

- Origin: San Diego, California, United States
- Genres: Bluegrass
- Years active: 1961–1963
- Label: Crown Records
- Past members: Chris Hillman; Ed Douglas; Larry Murray; Gary Carr; Kenny Wertz; Bernie Leadon; Doug Jeffords

The Scottsville Squirrel Barkers were a San Diego–based bluegrass group best known as the band that launched the careers of founding Byrds' member, Chris Hillman and founding Eagles' guitarist-songwriter, Bernie Leadon. The lineup included Hillman on mandolin, future Hearts & Flowers member Larry Murray on Dobro, Ed Douglas on stand-up bass, Gary Carr on guitar, and future Flying Burrito Brothers and Country Gazette member, Kenny Wertz on banjo. Leadon would replace Wertz on banjo when he left the group to join the Air Force in 1963 (Wertz would return the favor by replacing Leadon in the Flying Burrito Brothers when he left that group to start the Eagles in 1971). The group was named after Ed Douglas' hometown of Scottsville, KY.

Early in their history, the group served as the house band for The Blue Guitar, a noteworthy musical instrument shop in San Diego, CA which served as a hangout for bluegrass and acoustic musicians of the time. The group recorded only one album, Blue Grass Favorites in 1963, and disbanded later that year. They have all remained in contact over the years, reuniting sporadically since 2003 and most recently in 2009 at the Adams Avenue Roots Festival in San Diego.
