= Bernie Leadon =

American musician (born 1947)

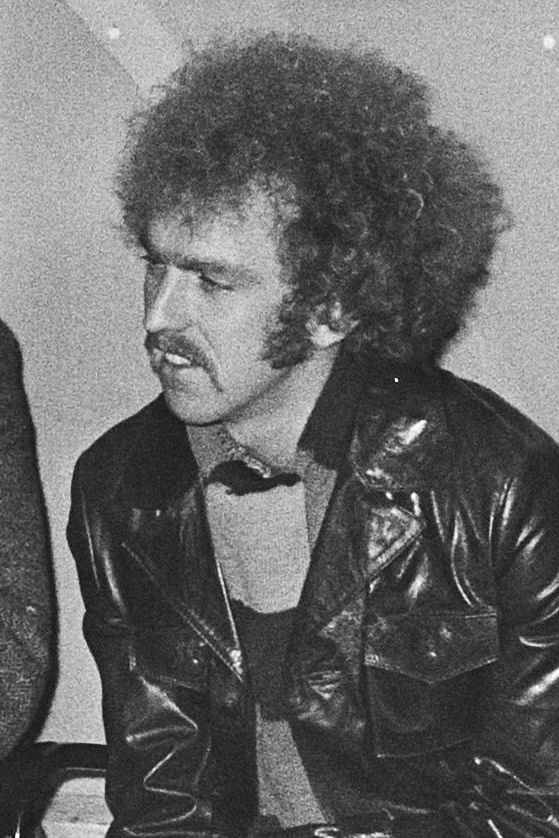
- Leadon in 1970

Background information
- Born: Bernard Matthew Leadon, III; July 19, 1947 (age 79); Minneapolis, Minnesota, U.S.
- Genres: Rock; country; country rock; bluegrass
- Occupations: Musician; songwriter
- Instruments: Vocals; guitar; banjo
- Years active: 1967–present
- Labels: Asylum; Really Small Entertainment
- Formerly of: Eagles; the Flying Burrito Brothers; Hearts & Flowers; Linda Ronstadt & The Corvettes; Scottsville Squirrel Barkers; Nitty Gritty Dirt Band; Run C&W; Ever Call Ready; Maundy Quintet

Bernard Matthew Leadon III (/ˈlɛdən/ LED-ən; born July 19, 1947) is an American singer, musician, songwriter, and founding member of Eagles, for which he was inducted into the Rock and Roll Hall of Fame in 1998. Prior to Eagles, he was a member of four country rock bands: Hearts & Flowers, Dillard & Clark, Linda Ronstadt & the Corvettes and the Flying Burrito Brothers. He is a multi-instrumentalist (guitar, banjo, mandolin, steel guitar, dobro) coming from a bluegrass background. He introduced elements of this music to a mainstream audience during his tenure with Eagles.

Leadon's solo career since leaving Eagles has been sporadic, resulting in two albums under his name (the first being a collaborative project with Michael Georgiades) with a gap of 27 years in between. However, Leadon appeared on many other artists' records as a session musician.

== Early life and musical beginnings ==
In 1957 Leadon moved with his family to San Diego, California, where he met fellow musicians Ed Douglas and Larry Murray of the local bluegrass outfit the Scottsville Squirrel Barkers. The Barkers proved a breeding ground for future California country rock talent, including shy, 18-year-old mandolin player Chris Hillman, with whom Leadon maintained a lifelong friendship. Augmented by banjo player (and future Flying Burrito Brother) Kenny Wertz, the Squirrel Barkers eventually asked Leadon to fill in, upon Wertz's joining the Air Force in 1963. However, Leadon did not become a member of the band.

He later met future Eagles lead guitarist Don Felder, whose band, the Continentals, had just lost guitarist Stephen Stills.

=== Hearts & Flowers ===
A call from ex-Squirrel Barker Larry Murray in 1967 to join his fledgling psychedelic country-folk group Hearts & Flowers and to replace Rick Cunha brought Leadon to California, where he became involved with the burgeoning L.A. folk/country rock scene. Leadon recorded one album with the band, its second release, Of Horses, Kids, and Forgotten Women, for Capitol Records. The record was a local hit but failed to make much of a dent on the national album charts. Discouraged, the group disbanded the following year.

=== Dillard & Clark ===
By late 1968, Leadon had befriended bluegrass/banjo legend Doug Dillard, late of the Dillards. While staying with Dillard, informal jam sessions with songwriter and ex-Byrds member Gene Clark began to take shape, and morphed into what eventually became the country-rock band Dillard & Clark. In 1968, the group recorded The Fantastic Expedition of Dillard & Clark, featuring Leadon's backing vocals and multi-instrumental work. The album included several compositions co-written with Clark, most notably the future Eagles staple (and somewhat of a signature song for Leadon) from their debut album, "Train Leaves Here This Morning". Leadon left Dillard & Clark in June 1969 to join Linda Ronstadt's band The Corvettes, replacing Jeff Hanna who returned to the Nitty Gritty Dirt Band.

=== The Flying Burrito Brothers ===
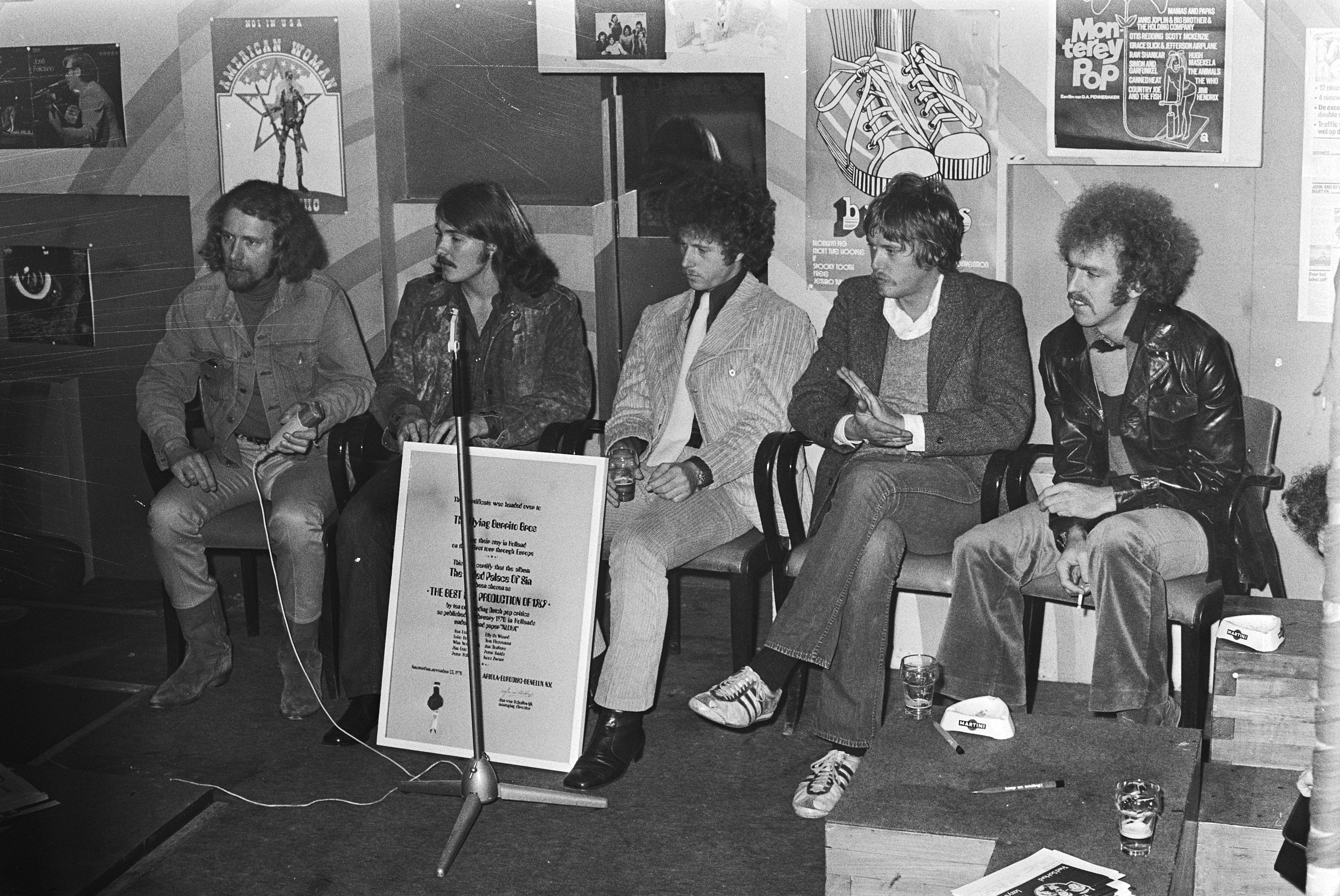
Flying Burrito Brothers (Amsterdam, 1970). From left to right: Sneaky Pete Kleinow, Rick Roberts, Chris Hillman, Michael Clarke, Bernie Leadon

In September 1969 Leadon reconnected with ex-Squirrel Barker (and ex-Byrd) Chris Hillman, who asked him to join the Flying Burrito Brothers, a fledgling country-rock band that Hillman had formed a year earlier with fellow ex-Byrd Gram Parsons. Leadon recorded two albums with the group: Burrito Deluxe and the post-Parsons LP The Flying Burrito Bros. After the latter album's release in 1971, Leadon had tired of the band's lack of commercial success and decided to leave the band to pursue an opportunity to play with three musicians he had worked with while moonlighting in Linda Ronstadt's backing band that summer, forming Eagles.

== Eagles ==
Leadon was the last original member to join Eagles, a band initially formed by guitarist/singer Glenn Frey, drummer/singer Don Henley, and former Poco bassist/singer Randy Meisner. Leadon is often credited with helping shape the band's early country-rock sound, bringing his strong sense of harmony as well as his country, bluegrass and acoustic sensibilities to the group. Instruments he played during his tenure in the band were electric guitar, B-Bender, acoustic guitar, banjo, mandolin, dobro and pedal steel guitar.

Upon the release of their debut album, Eagles, the group met with near instant success, due largely to the strength of their hit singles "Take It Easy", "Peaceful Easy Feeling" and "Witchy Woman" (the latter co-written by Leadon and Henley), all of which highlighted Leadon's multi-instrumental talent and harmony vocals. Their follow-up, Desperado, was another strong country-rock venture highlighted by the classics "Tequila Sunrise" and the title track. Leadon had a prominent role on the album but it was met by surprisingly lukewarm reviews and lackluster sales. As a result, the band attempted to distance itself from the "country rock" label for their third album On the Border. In doing so, Leadon encouraged the group to recruit his old friend, guitarist Don Felder, to the band. The result was the guitar-heavy top 40 hit "Already Gone". The album also included "My Man", which had started as Leadon's tribute to his old friend Duane Allman, who always greeted Leadon saying "Hey, My Man", hence the name of the song, and who had died in 1971 in a motorcycle accident. "My Man" eventually also became a tribute to Leadon's old bandmate and friend Gram Parsons, who had died of a drug overdose the year prior at Joshua Tree National Monument in southeastern California.

With the wild success of On the Border and its follow-up smash, One of These Nights, tension within the band grew with Leadon expressing concern over the constant recording, touring and drug use and suggested a break in Hawaii for a month to recuperate, straighten out and maintain longer term reliance by restoring a healthier work/life balance. Henley and Frey rejected this suggestion and insisted they maintain upward momentum. Leadon famously quit the band in 1975 by pouring a beer over Glenn Frey's head. Leadon later cited a need to get healthy and break the vicious cycle of touring, recording and heavy drug use that was rampant within the band as his personal reason for quitting the band.

Upon Leadon's departure, Asylum Records released Their Greatest Hits (1971–1975), which highlighted the band's Leadon years and went on to become the best-selling album in United States history, with sales in excess of 38 million units. He was replaced by former James Gang guitarist and singer Joe Walsh.

Although it has long been believed that he left because he was dissatisfied with the band moving into rock and roll, Leadon denies it and said in 2013, "That's an oversimplification, it implies that I had no interest in rock or blues or anything but country rock. That's just not the case. I didn't just play Fender Telecaster. I played a Gibson Les Paul and I enjoyed rock & roll. That's evident from the early albums."

A clear sense of Leadon's diverse multi-instrumental genre-crossing contributions to the Eagles is evidenced in the televised live performance: The Eagles In Concert 1973

== Later career ==
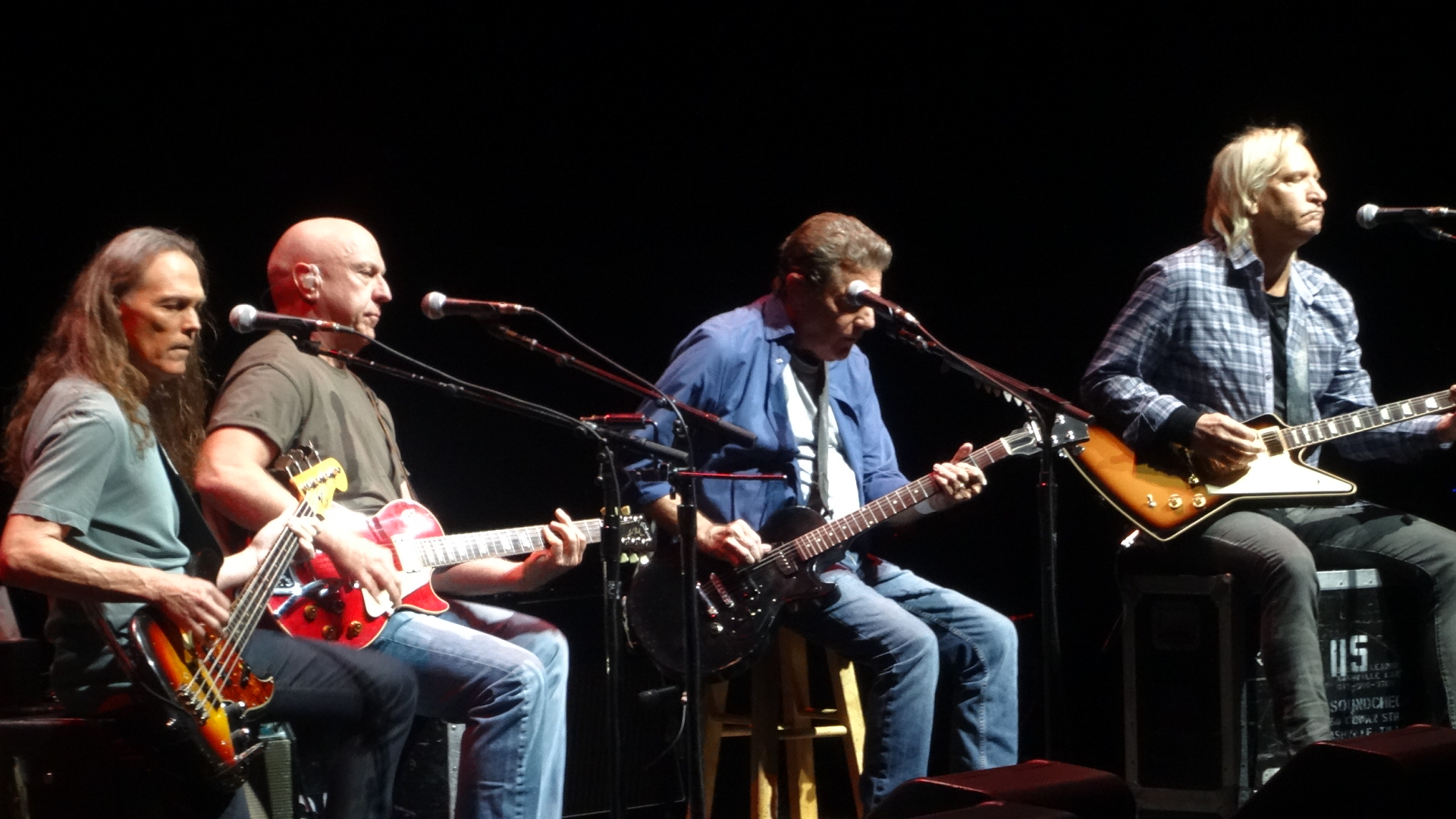
History of the Eagles tour, 2014; Leadon (second from left) joined the tour

Upon leaving the Eagles, Leadon retreated from the limelight, only to resurface in 1977 with musician friend Michael Georgiades for the album, Natural Progressions (credited to "The Bernie Leadon-Michael Georgiades Band"), featuring Leadon and Georgiades on guitars and alternating lead vocals, along with Bryan Garofalo on bass, Dave Kemper on drums, and Steve Goldstein on keyboard.

In 1985, he recorded an album of bluegrass and gospel favorites under the name Ever Call Ready, featuring Chris Hillman and Al Perkins. He also had a short stint with the Nitty Gritty Dirt Band in the late 1980s.

In 1992 Leadon co-produced and played on Michelle Shocked's album Arkansas Traveler, a folk country roots album with guest performances and collaborations from historically significant American musicians. Leadon is credited as a co-producer and music director on track 3 "Secret to a Long Life" featuring The Band members Levon Helm and Gareth Hudson with Albert Lee and Tony Levin, track 4 "Contest Coming (Cripple Creek)" featuring Bernie Leadon and the Red Clay Ramblers, track 6 "Shaking Hand's (Soldier's Joy)" featuring Bernie Leadon and Uncle Tupelo, track 8 "Hold me back (Frankie and Johnnie)" featuring Bernie Leadon, Clarence "Gatemouth" Brown and his band, track 9 "Strawberry Jam" featuring Doic Watson, Mark O'Connor and Jerry Douglas, track 13 "Arkansas Teveller" featuring Bernie Leadon and Jimmy Driftwood, and track 14 "Woody's Rag (Woodie Guthrie)" featruring Bernie Leadon with her brother Max Johnson and her father Dollar Bill.

In 1993, he became a member of Run C&W, a novelty group singing various Motown hits "bluegrass style", recording two albums for MCA Records.

In 1998, Leadon reunited with Eagles in New York City for the band's induction into the Rock and Roll Hall of Fame. All seven current and former Eagles members performed together on "Take It Easy" and "Hotel California".

In 2004, he released his second solo effort in 27 years (and his first under solely his name), Mirror.

Leadon toured with Eagles from 2013 through 2015 during their History of the Eagles Tour In 2015, Leadon appeared on producer Ethan Johns’s third solo album, Silver Liner.

In February 2016, Leadon appeared at the Grammy Awards ceremony with Jackson Browne and the surviving Eagles members - Don Henley, Joe Walsh, and Timothy B. Schmit - performing "Take it Easy", in tribute to Glenn Frey who had died a month earlier.

== Personal life ==
For a few years in the mid-1970s, Leadon lived in Topanga Canyon, a bohemian enclave known for its musician residents. Leadon's house-plus-recording-studio had previously been owned by singer-songwriter Neil Young, and was the site of frequent parties. Leadon lived with Patti Davis, the daughter of conservative California Governor Ronald Reagan, who was at that time campaigning for president and distancing himself from his daughter because Leadon and she were unmarried but living together. Leadon and Davis co-wrote the song "I Wish You Peace", which Leadon insisted Eagles include on the album One of These Nights, against the wishes of his bandmates.

His younger brother, Tom Leadon, was a founding member of Mudcrutch.

== Sources ==
- Elliot, Marc (1998). To the Limit: The Untold Story of the Eagles. Little, Brown. ISBN 978-0-316-23370-5.
- Einarson, John (2001). Desperados: The Roots of Country Rock. Cooper Square Press. ISBN 978-0-8154-1065-2.
- Einarson, John (2005). Mr. Tambourine Man: The Life and Legacy of the Byrds' Gene Clark. Backbeat books. ISBN 0-87930-793-5.
- Felder, Don (2008). Heaven and Hell: My Life in the Eagles (1974-2001). with Wendy Holden. Wiley. ISBN 978-0-470-28906-8.
- Einarson, John (2008). Hot Burritos: The True Story of The Flying Burrito Brothers. with Chris Hillman. Jawbone Press. ISBN 978-1-906002-16-9.
- Kubernik, Harvey (2009). Canyon of Dreams: The Magic and the Music of Laurel Canyon. Sterling. ISBN 978-1-4027-9761-3.
- Vaughan, Andrew (2015). The Eagles FAQ: All That's Left to Know About Classic Rock's Superstars. Backbeat Books. ISBN 978-1-4803-8541-2.
