= Don Parmley =

- Born: October 19, 1933
- Died: June 30, 2016 (aged 82)
- Genres: Bluegrass

Don Parmley (19 October 1933 – 30 June 2016) was a bluegrass musician known best for his work with the Bluegrass Cardinals, a group he formed in 1974. Prior to Bluegrass Cardinals, Parmley was a member of The Hillmen.

== Early life and education ==
Parmley was born in Wayne County, Kentucky in 1933, moving to Southern California a few years later.

== Career ==
Parmley began his career as a member of The Hillmen, playing alongside members Vern Gosdin and Chris Hillman. Parmley was working as a musician for the television show The Beverly Hillbillies and is credited with all banjo work on the show with the exception of the intro theme song. Chris Hillman had moved on from The Hillmen, finding success with the group The Byrds. Parmley then moved on to form the Bluegrass Cardinals along with Randy Graham and Parmley's 15-year-old son David Parmley.

Parmley retired from the Bluegrass Cardinals in 1997 with his son David moving on to form the band Continental Divide. Parmley occasionally sang in concerts with the Continental Divide. He died on July 30, 2016, at age 83.

== Discography ==
For discography as part of a group, see The Hillmen and Bluegrass Cardinals.

=== Albums ===
Title	Details
5 String Banjo with 12 String Guitar	Released: 1997; Label: GNP/Crescendo; Format: Album
