= The Hillmen =

American bluegrass band

- The Hillmen (from left to right): Chris Hillman, Don Parmley, Rex Gosdin, and Vern Gosdin.

Background information
- Origin: Los Angeles, California, United States
- Genres: Bluegrass
- Years active: 1962–1964
- Labels: Together
- Past members: Chris Hillman; Vern Gosdin; Rex Gosdin; Don Parmley; Hal Poindexter

The Hillmen (a.k.a. the Golden State Boys) were a southern Californian bluegrass group. Formed in 1962, the original line-up of the Golden State Boys consisted of Vern Gosdin on guitar and lead vocals, his brother Rex Gosdin on double bass, Hal Poindexter on guitar, and Don Parmley on banjo. Poindexter left the group in late 1962, however, and was replaced by 17-year-old mandolin prodigy Chris Hillman. Hillman, who had previously been a member of the high-profile San Diego bluegrass group the Scottsville Squirrel Barkers, was invited to join the Golden State Boys by Parmley, after the pair met at a bluegrass evening at The Ice House folk club in Pasadena. Upon his recruitment, the group briefly changed their name to the Blue Diamond Boys before finally settling on The Hillmen, in honor of their mandolin playing wunderkind.

The Hillmen played regularly throughout southern California between 1962 and 1964 and also made a number of television appearances, bringing them to the attention of record producer Jim Dickson. Over the course of three months in 1963 and 1964, Dickson recorded The Hillmen at World Pacific Studios in Los Angeles, in an attempt to secure a recording contract with Elektra Records. Unfortunately, Elektra turned the group down and the World Pacific recordings went unreleased until 1969, when they were issued on the Together Records imprint as The Hillmen album.

By mid-1964, the group had broken up and Chris Hillman was subsequently recruited by Jim Dickson as The Byrds' bass player in October of that year. Following The Hillmen's demise, Parmley went on to form the Bluegrass Cardinals, while Vern Gosdin became a country and western singer and Rex Gosdin worked as a songwriter.

== Personnel ==
- Chris Hillman – mandolin, vocals
- Vern Gosdin – guitar, vocals
- Rex Gosdin – double bass, vocals
- Don Parmley – banjo, vocals
- Hal Poindexter - guitar
