= CMH Records =

- Founded: 1975
- Founder: Martin Haerle; Arthur "Guitar Boogie" Smith
- Genre: Country, bluegrass
- Country of origin: United States
- Location: Los Angeles, California
- Official website: www.cmhrecords.com

CMH Records is a Los Angeles-based, independent country and bluegrass label with several subsidiary labels, including Vitamin Records, Crosscheck, Dwell, and Rockabye Baby!. The label release diverse styles of music including string quartet tributes, punk, metal, and lullabies.

== History ==
CMH co-founder Martin Haerle grew up in Stuttgart, Germany during World War II, where he heard American country music on Armed Forces Radio. At the age of 20 he moved to Nashville to work in the mailroom at Starday Records, where he learned the record business from legendary label president and A&R man Don Pierce. Haerle was promoted to vice president by the early 1960s, and later worked in country radio. In 1968, he became general manager of United Artists Records' manufacturing division.

In 1975, Haerle formed CMH in Los Angeles with Arthur Smith, the renowned guitarist who wrote both the million-selling "Guitar Boogie" and "Dueling Banjos," the bluegrass standard made famous by the movie Deliverance. By the mid 1970s, major country labels including RCA and MCA had dropped all of their bluegrass acts, with the notable exception of Bill Monroe. CMH was one of a small number of independent labels that cropped up to fill the void.

Haerle and Smith signed many major first-generation bluegrass artists, some contemporary bluegrass groups, and several important country artists. Writes Jonny Whiteside in LA Weekly, "They churned a slow but steady series of albums by out-of-fashion geniuses, like Merle Travis, Joe and Rose Lee Maphis and Grandpa Jones, carving out a corner of the market for marginalized and ignored country stars (much the way his mentor Pierce did at Starday Records in the 1960s)."

Between 1975 and 1988, CMH released albums by Lester Flatt & The Nashville Grass, The Osborne Brothers, Jim & Jesse, Mac Wiseman, Carl Story, The Stonemans, Josh Graves, Don Reno, Benny Martin, The Bluegrass Cardinals, IInd Generation featuring Eddie Adcock, Grandpa Jones, Merle Travis, Joe Maphis, Johnny Gimble, Carl & Pearl Butler, and the only studio album by legendary songwriters Felice and Boudleaux Bryant.

When Martin Haerle died in 1990, his son David Haerle stepped in to run the label, and created the Pickin' On series, which consists of bluegrass tributes to rock, pop and country artists including Jimmy Buffett, Kenny Chesney, Led Zeppelin, and The Offspring. The first title in the series was Pickin' on The Beatles (1994), but it wasn't until three years later that the concept took off with the success of Pickin' on The Grateful Dead.

Labels under the CMH umbrella include Vitamin Records, Rockabye Baby!, Dwell, Crosscheck, Scufflin', PanAm, Urabon, Rockwell, OCD International, School of Rock, and Open Mike.

== Partial discography ==
- Lost Songs: Songs the Beatles Gave Away (2007)
- Strummin' With The Devil: The Southern Side of Van Halen - A Tribute Featuring David Lee Roth (2006)
- The Nashville Acoustic Sessions, Raul Malo, Pat Flynn, Rob Ickes, Dave Pomeroy (2004)
- Heart Trouble, Wanda Jackson (2003)
- Fade to Bluegrass: The Bluegrass Tribute to Metallica (2003)
- Corporate Love Breakdown: The Bluegrass Tribute to Radiohead

== Roster ==
CMH Records

- Eddie Adcock
- Bluegrass Cardinals
- Johnny Bond
- Felice and Boudleaux Bryant
- Cache Valley Drifters
- Carl Butler and Pearl
- Larry Cordle
- Lester Flatt
- Jimmy Gaudreau
- Johnny Gimble
- Josh Graves
- Wanda Jackson
- Jim & Jesse
- Grandpa Jones
- Lonesome Standard Time
- Manuela
- Joe Maphis
- Benny Martin
- Jimmy Martin
- Nashville Grass
- Osborne Brothers
- David Parmley
- Don Reno
- David Lee Roth
- Arthur "Guitar Boogie" Smith
- Buddy Spicher
- The Stonemans
- Carl Story
- Marty Stuart
- Merle Travis
- The Willis Brothers
- Mac Wiseman

OCD International

- Kool Keith (Dr. Octagon)

Dwell Records

- Antagonist
- Behemoth
- The Chasm
- Coffin Texts
- Evoken
- Exhausted Prayer
- Fight Pretty
- Hail! Hornet
- Inner Thought
- It Is I
- Mayhem
- Opera IX
- Soilent Green
- Stormcrow

Crosscheck Records

- Electric Frankenstein
- Hammer Bros.
- Street Dogs
- U.S. Bombs
- Vice Dolls

Scufflin' Records

- Lonnie Smith
- Reuben Wilson
- Bernie Worrell

Secret Life of Records

- Violent Femmes

== See also ==
- Pickin' On
- Rockabye Baby!
- Vitamin Records
- Vitamin String Quartet
