= Chris Hillman =

American musician (born 1944)

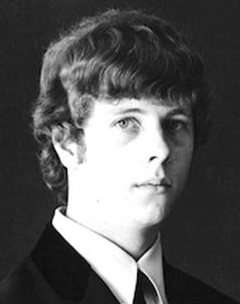
- Hillman in 1965

Background information
- Born: Christopher Hillman; December 4, 1944 (age 81); Los Angeles, California, U.S.
- Genres: Folk; bluegrass; folk rock; rock; country rock; country
- Occupation: Musician
- Instruments: Bass; guitar; mandolin; vocals
- Years active: 1960–present
- Labels: Columbia; Sugar Hill; Asylum; A&M; Rounder
- Formerly of: Scottsville Squirrel Barkers; The Hillmen; The Byrds; The Flying Burrito Brothers; Manassas; Souther Hillman Furay Band; McGuinn, Clark & Hillman; The Desert Rose Band
- Website: www.chrishillman.com

Christopher Hillman (born December 4, 1944) is an American musician. He was the original bassist of the Byrds. With frequent collaborator Gram Parsons, Hillman was a key figure in the development of country rock, defining the genre through his work with the Byrds, the Flying Burrito Brothers, Manassas and the country-rock group the Desert Rose Band. He was inducted into the Rock and Roll Hall of Fame in 1991 as a member of the Byrds.

== Early life ==
Hillman was born in Los Angeles, California, the third of four children. He spent his early years at his family's ranch home in rural northern San Diego County, approximately 110 miles (180 km) from Los Angeles. He has credited his older sister with exciting his interest in country and folk music, when she returned from college during the late 1950s with folk music records by The New Lost City Ramblers and others. Hillman soon began watching many of the country-music shows on local television in southern California at the time such as Town Hall Party, The Spade Cooley Show and Cal's Corral. Hillman's mother encouraged his musical interests and bought him his first guitar; shortly thereafter he developed an interest in bluegrass, particularly the mandolin. At the age of 15, Hillman went to Los Angeles to see the Kentucky Colonels bluegrass band at the Ash Grove, and later convinced his family to allow him to travel by train to Berkeley for lessons from mandolinist Scott Hambly. When Chris was 16, his father committed suicide.

Hillman became known in San Diego's folk music community as a solid player; this won him an invitation to join his first band, the Scottsville Squirrel Barkers. The band lasted barely two years, recording only one album (Blue Grass Favorites, which was distributed in supermarkets); however, it has a posthumous reputation as the spawning ground for a number of musicians who went on to play in the Eagles, the Flying Burrito Brothers, the Byrds, Hearts & Flowers, and the Country Gazette. When the band broke up in late 1963 Hillman received an invitation to join the Golden State Boys, regarded as the top bluegrass band in southern California and featuring future country star Vern Gosdin, his brother Rex and banjoist Don Parmley (later of the Bluegrass Cardinals). Shortly thereafter the band changed its name to The Hillmen; soon Hillman was appearing regularly on television and using a fictitious ID, "Chris Hardin", to allow the underage musician into the country bars where many of his gigs were played. When the Hillmen folded, he briefly joined a spinoff of Randy Sparks' New Christy Minstrels known as the Green Grass Revival.

== Career ==
=== The Byrds (1964–1968) ===
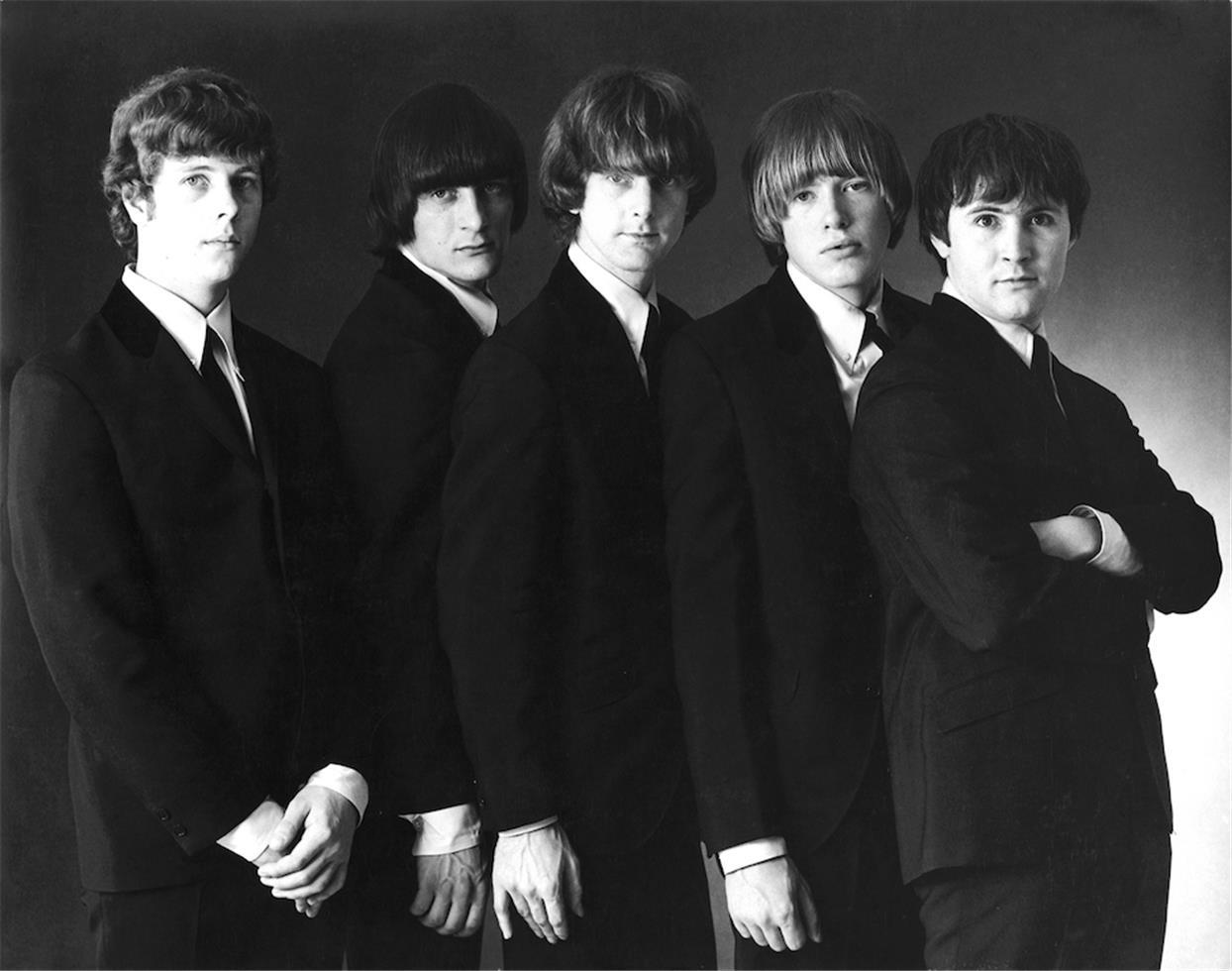
Hillman (far left) as a member of the Byrds in 1965

At this point a frustrated Hillman considered quitting music and enrolling at UCLA when he received an offer from The Hillmen's former manager and producer, Jim Dickson, to join Jim (later Roger) McGuinn, David Crosby, Gene Clark and Michael Clarke in a new band, The Byrds. Hillman was recruited to play bass guitar, although he had never picked up the instrument. Thanks to his bluegrass background, he quickly developed his own melodic style on the instrument. The Byrds' first single, a jangly cover of Bob Dylan's "Mr. Tambourine Man", was an international hit and marked the birth of folk rock. During the mid-1960s the Byrds ranked as one of the most successful and influential American pop groups; they recorded a string of hits, including "Turn! Turn! Turn!", and "Eight Miles High".

Hillman kept a low profile on the band's first two albums, on which McGuinn and Clark shared lead vocals with Crosby adding high harmony and singing the bridge on "All I Really Want to Do". However, Clark's departure in 1966 and Crosby's growing restlessness allowed Hillman the opportunity to develop as a singer and songwriter in the group. He came into his own on the Byrds' 1967 album Younger Than Yesterday, co-writing and sharing lead vocals with McGuinn on the hit "So You Want to Be a Rock 'n' Roll Star". Hillman also wrote (and sang) the minor hit "Have You Seen Her Face", "Thoughts and Words", "Time Between" and "The Girl with No Name", the latter two demonstrating his bluegrass and country roots. Hillman's prominence continued with the Byrds' next album, The Notorious Byrd Brothers, on which he shared songwriting credit on seven of the album's eleven songs.

=== Pioneering country rock ===
Internal strife dogged the Byrds, and by the beginning of 1968 the band was down to two original members (Hillman and McGuinn), with Hillman's cousin Kevin Kelley on drums. They then hired Gram Parsons to replace Crosby. Hillman, who had brought country music into the Byrds' earliest recording of "Satisfied Mind", found another lover of country music in Parsons. Sweetheart of the Rodeo was recorded in Nashville and Los Angeles and continues to inspire musicians in the Americana format. Parsons left the band shortly thereafter; Hillman brought in former Kentucky Colonels guitarist Clarence White as a replacement and White suggested that the group replace Kelley with Gene Parsons (no relation to Gram) on drums, but this line-up was short-lived and Hillman himself left the Byrds due to financial misappropriation by their management.

=== The Flying Burrito Brothers (1969–1972) ===
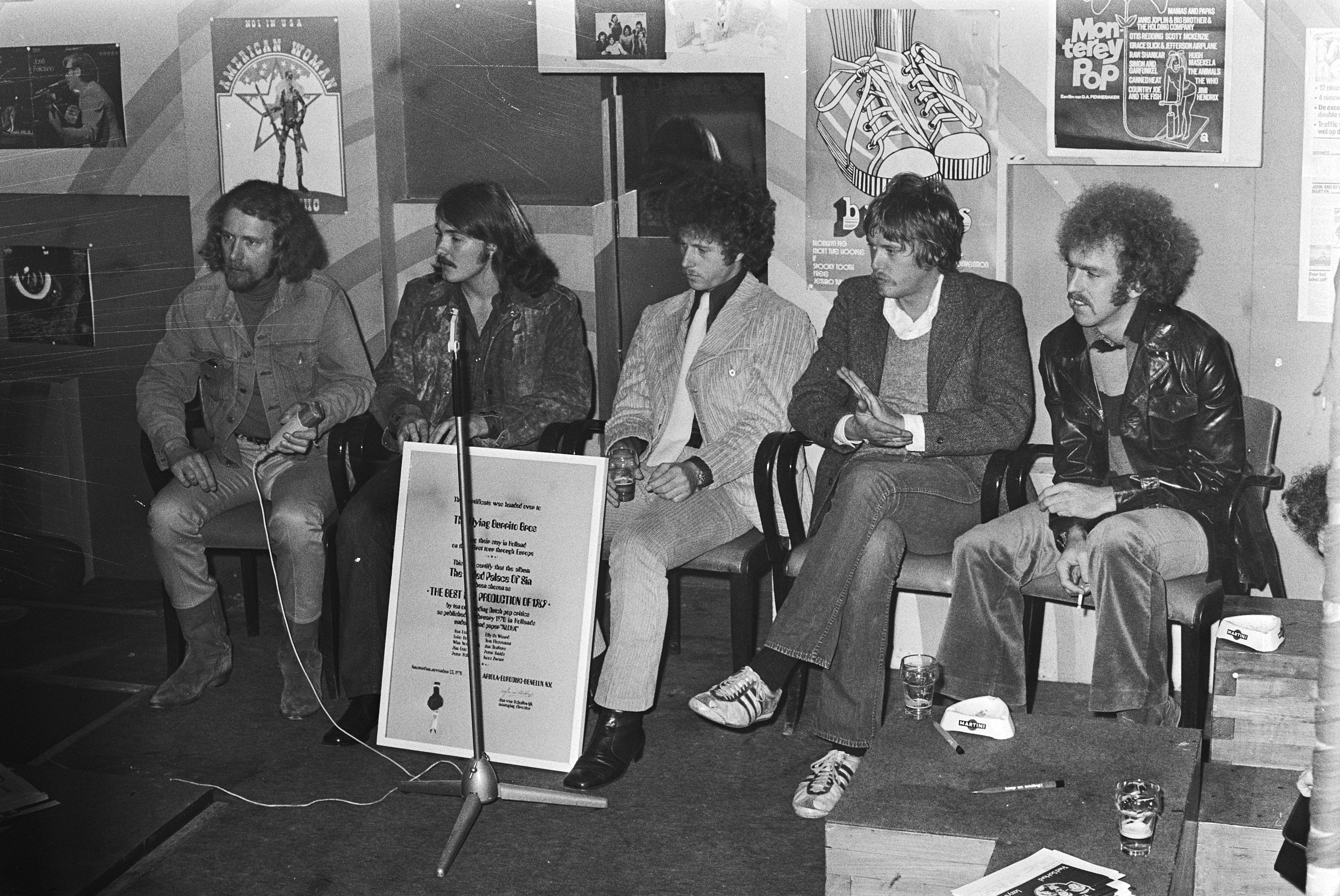
The Flying Burrito Brothers (Amsterdam, 1970). From left to right: 'Sneaky' Pete Kleinow, Rick Roberts, Chris Hillman, Michael Clarke & Bernie Leadon

Hillman teamed with Gram Parsons again (this time as vocalist, guitarist and songwriter) to form the Flying Burrito Brothers. Further honing their pioneering country-rock hybrid sound by combining the energy, instrumentation and attitude of rock and roll with the issues and themes of country music, the Burritos recorded the landmark The Gilded Palace of Sin (1969) followed by 1970's Burrito Deluxe. Parsons was fired from the line-up by June 1970 (replaced by guitarist Rick Roberts) when the band toured Canada as part of the Festival Express tour, with Hillman reverting to bass guitar. Hillman stayed with the band for two more records, The Flying Burrito Brothers and Last of the Red Hot Burritos.

=== Various bands and solo career (1970s) ===
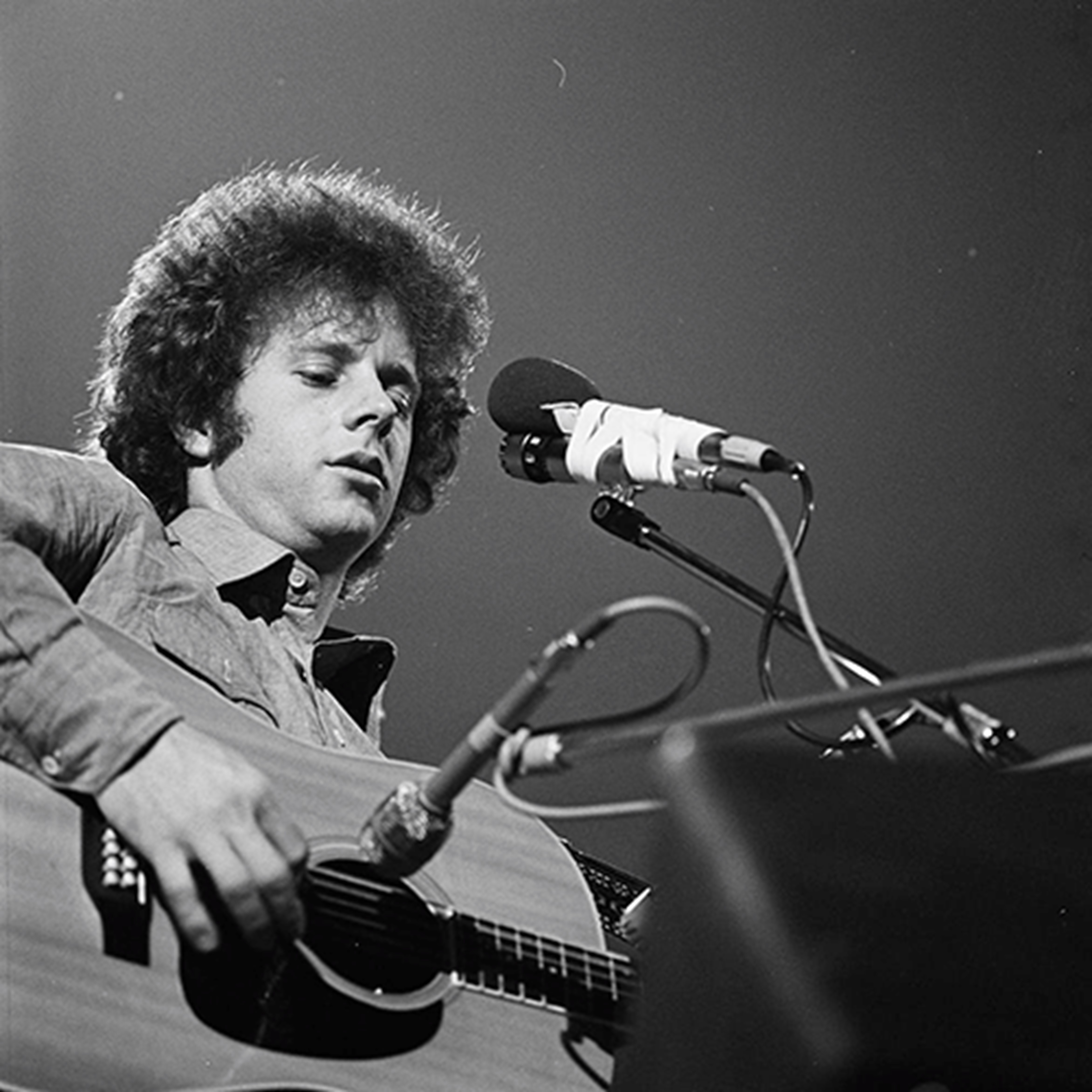
Hillman in 1972

Before the Flying Burrito Brothers disbanded, Hillman joined Stephen Stills' band Manassas. They released two albums, a 1972 self-titled double album, and a 1973 album Down the Road. Led by Stills, Manassas was an exploration into a mixture of rock, country, blues, bluegrass and Latin music. In 1972, Stills gave Hillman a 1924 Lloyd Loar Gibson F-5 mandolin. Hillman remained with Manassas until 1973, when he briefly re-joined the original line-up of the Byrds for a reunion album on Asylum Records.

In 1974, Hillman teamed with singer-songwriter Richie Furay (who co-founded Buffalo Springfield and Poco) and songwriter JD Souther (who co-wrote much of the Eagles' early repertoire) in the Souther-Hillman-Furay Band. The trio never quite gelled, and broke up in 1975 after two albums and internal squabbles.

Hillman released two solo albums, Slippin' Away and Clear Sailin', which included several songs co-written with Crawdaddy magazine editor Peter Knobler. One of their songs, "Step on Out," was recorded by The Oak Ridge Boys on their 1985 album and became the title cut. He was also an in-demand studio musician, playing and singing on sessions for Gene Clark, Dillard & Clark, Poco, Dan Fogelberg and others. After an early 1977 UK tour reunited him with Roger McGuinn and Gene Clark, the trio stayed together as McGuinn, Clark & Hillman for two albums (on which Hillman continued his songwriting collaboration with Knobler) and one under the McGuinn-Hillman name, with a hit single in 1979's "Don't You Write Her Off".

=== The Desert Rose Band (1985–1994, 2008) ===
By the early 1980s Hillman had returned to his bluegrass and country roots, recording two acclaimed (mainly acoustic) albums for Sugar Hill Records with singer/guitarist/banjo player Herb Pedersen (a former member of The Dillards).

Hillman and Pedersen were touring in 1985 with Dan Fogelberg in support of his Newgrass album High Country Snows as well as appearing on the album when Hillman put together the Desert Rose Band, a Country band with elements of Western and Newgrass. Along with Pedersen, he recruited other members of Fogelberg's band including John Jorgenson & Bill Bryson.

The Desert Rose Band proved to be Hillman's most commercially-successful post-Byrds project. Their self-titled debut album in 1987 generated two Top Ten country hits in "Love Reunited" (written with Steve Hill), "One Step Forward" and the number-one single "He's Back and I'm Blue." From 1987 until late 1993 the band recorded five albums and one Greatest Hits package and had a string of 16 country-music hits (the majority of which were in the Country Top Ten) and a number of Academy of Country Music awards before disbanding in 1994.

Chris Hillman, Herb Pedersen, JayDee Maness, John Jorgenson, Bill Bryson, and Steve Duncan performed their first reunion concert on August 27, 2008 in Solana Beach, CA. Before this date Chris Hillman and Herb Pedersen were a duo joined by John Jorgenson on May 2, 2008 for a small DRB set at the Station Inn in Nashville. This six-man lineup is the best known, and includes all of the original members present on the hit albums from the 1980s. At this show, Hillman said it was the first time they had played together in 19 years. They went through a string of DRB hits but were unable to play "He's Back and I'm Blue" because Hillman said he had forgotten the words. This sold-out show prompted Hillman and the band to play a handful of other reunion shows at music festivals throughout the U.S. Several of these were recorded for inclusion on a live album, which Hillman hopes to release in the U.S. and Europe. If released, this will be the Desert Rose Band's only live album.

=== 1990s and beyond ===
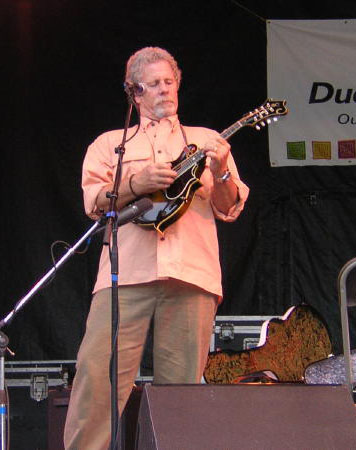
Hillman in 2004

At the peak of the Desert Rose Band's success, Hillman began appearing infrequently with McGuinn. A duet recorded by the pair for the Nitty Gritty Dirt Band's Will The Circle Be Unbroken Vol. II album, "You Ain't Going Nowhere", reached the Country Top 10 in 1989. Soon the pair joined Crosby in a reformed Byrds, playing a handful of club dates. In 1990 they appeared at a tribute to Roy Orbison, performing "Mr. Tambourine Man" with the song's composer Bob Dylan. That same year the Byrds cut four new songs for inclusion in a career-spanning box set, and in 1991 they were inducted into the Rock and Roll Hall of Fame. In 1996 Hillman reunited with Desert Rose Band alumnus Herb Pederson for the CD Bakersfield Bound. Like a Hurricane (1998) and three bluegrass-flavored releases on Rounder Records with Pedersen, Larry Rice, and Tony Rice followed. He appeared on the 1999 album Return of the Grievous Angel: A Tribute to Gram Parsons in a duet with Steve Earle on "High Fashion Queen" (which Hillman wrote with Parsons).

After a brief hiatus Hillman and Pedersen returned with Way Out West (2002), a 17-track collection of country, roots rock and Americana; this was followed by The Other Side (2005). In 2010 he recorded "Live at Edwards Barn" with Herb Pedersen for Rounder Records.

Hillman has continued to write, perform and tour, with dates in 2017 with Herb Pedersen and John Jorgenson. He released his latest album, Bidin' My Time (2017), co-produced with Tom Petty, featuring guests including Roger McGuinn, David Crosby and members of The Heartbreakers. This has been described as "a kind of summing up of Hillman's long and varied career, incorporating the folk, bluegrass, country and rock styles he's touched on over the years."

Along with Roger McGuinn, Marty Stuart and his Fabulous Superlatives, Hillman toured the U.S. to commemorate the 50th Anniversary of the Sweetheart of the Rodeo album, to sold out venues and outstanding reviews.

His memoir, Time Between: My Life as a Byrd, Burrito Brother and Beyond, was published by BMG Books in November 2020, with positive reviews in Rolling Stone, The Wall Street Journal, the Associated Press, and other major media.

== Personal life ==
Chris Hillman identifies as a Christian although his father was Jewish. He married former record executive Connie Pappas in 1979, who influenced him to affiliate with the Greek Orthodox Church. He later stated, "I’m still learning. You know what I do on Sundays? I sing in a choir. I sing in a Greek Orthodox choir, and I’m the only hillbilly tenor in the Orthodox Church." Hillman and Pappas have two children, Catherine and Nicholas.

== Discography ==
=== Other Singles ===
Year	Single	Peak positions		Album
Year	Single	US Country	CAN Country	Album
1984	"Somebody's Back in Town"	81	—	Desert Rose
1985	"Running the Roadblocks"	77	—	Desert Rose
1989	"You Ain't Going Nowhere" (with Roger McGuinn)	6	11	Will the Circle Be Unbroken: Volume Two
"—" denotes releases that did not chart

Awards
Preceded by Levon Helm	AMA Lifetime Achievement Award for Performing; 2004	Succeeded by Marty Stuart
