= The World in a Sea Shell =

Studio album by Strawberry Alarm Clock
- Released: November 1968
- Recorded: 1968
- Genre: Psychedelic pop; sunshine pop
- Length: 34:09
- Label: Uni
- Producer: Frank Slay, Bill Holmes

Strawberry Alarm Clock chronology
Wake Up...It's Tomorrow (1968)	The World in a Sea Shell (1968)	Good Morning Starshine (1969)

Professional ratings
Review scores
Source	Rating
Allmusic	2.5/5 stars

The World in a Sea Shell is the third album by the American psychedelic rock band Strawberry Alarm Clock, released in November 1968 on Uni Records. The album was not a chart success, and was the final LP to include the classic Strawberry Alarm Clock lineup.

== Background ==
When the band's second album, Wake Up...It's Tomorrow (1968), failed to recapture the huge success of 1967's Incense and Peppermints, the band's management decided to exert more control over the recordings for the third album. To this end, they pressured the band to record several compositions written by outsiders, including Carole King and "Incense and Peppermints" lyricists John Carter and Tim Gilbert. The band members bristled at this situation, but reluctantly agreed to it in the end. Thus, five of the album's 12 songs (including most of side 1 of the vinyl LP) were non-group songs.

The new direction did not pay off commercially for the band. Many of the tracks on The World in a Sea Shell featured lush orchestration and a gentle, escapist feel that stood in stark contrast to the adventurous psychedelia of the band's past work. This sudden change in direction, seen as a gross miscalculation on their managers' part by the band members, helped seal Strawberry Alarm Clock's fate. This frustrated the band, as their own compositions for this album included some adventurous moments and sound collages that fans might have expected and that weren't too far removed from the style of the previous albums.

== Singles from the album ==
Two singles were released: "Sea Shell" (which didn't chart in the US; No. 88 in Canada) and "Barefoot in Baltimore" (which peaked at No. 67 on the US Billboard Hot 100 the weeks of September 7, 14 and 21, 1968, and No. 45 in Canada). The latter was especially popular on local radio stations in its namesake city of Baltimore, Maryland and was used as a theme song for the city for decades afterwards.

== Aftermath ==
In the wake of the album's release, long-time members George Bunnell and Randy Seol departed, with the lineup on the band's subsequent (and final) album, Good Morning Starshine (1969), consisting of guitarists Lee Freeman and Ed King, augmented by former Nightcrawlers singer/guitarist Jimmy Pitman and returning drummer Gene Gunnels (the latter of whom had originally left SAC shortly after performing on "Incense and Peppermints").

== Track listing ==
Side one

1. "Sea Shell" (John Carter, Tim Gilbert) – 3:02
2. "Blues for a Young Girl Gone" (Carole King, Toni Stern) – 2:31
3. "An Angry Young Man" (Bob Stone) – 2:28
4. "A Million Smiles Away" (Lee Freeman, Ed King) – 2:37
5. "Home Sweet Home" (Carter, Gilbert) – 2:39
6. "Lady of the Lake" (C. King, Stern) – 3:00

Side two

1. "Barefoot in Baltimore" (Roy Freeman, E. King, Mark Weitz) – 2:23
2. "Wooden Woman" (L. Freeman) – 2:07
3. "Heated Love" (George Bunnell, Randy Seol) – 1:58
4. "Love Me Again" (L. Freeman, E. King) – 3:31
5. "Eulogy" (Bunnell, Roy Freeman, Seol) – 1:48
6. "Shallow Impressions" (Weitz) – 3:22

== Personnel ==
Strawberry Alarm Clock

- George Bunnell – bass guitar, vocals
- Randy Seol – drums, keyboards, percussion, vocals
- Lee Freeman – rhythm guitar, sitar, vocals
- Ed King – guitar, vocals
- Mark Weitz – keyboards, vocals

Additional personnel

- George Tipton – arrangements
- Howard Davis – vocal arrangements

Technical

- Paul Buff – engineer
- Don Weller – cover illustration
