= Good Morning Starshine (Strawberry Alarm Clock album) =

Studio album by Strawberry Alarm Clock
- Released: May 1969
- Recorded: 1969
- Genre: Blues rock; psychedelic pop; psychedelic rock
- Length: 41:21
- Label: Uni
- Producer: Strawberry Alarm Clock; Julius Zabadak (track 6)

Strawberry Alarm Clock chronology
The World in a Sea Shell (1968)	Good Morning Starshine (1969)	The Best of the Strawberry Alarm Clock (1970)

Singles from Good Morning Starshine
- 1. "Miss Attraction" Released: 1969; 2. "Good Morning Starshine" Released: 1969

Good Morning Starshine is the fourth album by American psychedelic rock band Strawberry Alarm Clock, released in 1969 on Uni Records (see 1969 in music). It featured a considerably altered lineup and a departure from the sound on the group's past psychedelic pop works, toward blues rock. The album itself failed to chart, but a single, "Good Morning Starshine", peaked in the lower reaches of the Billboard Hot 100.

== Background ==
Lineup changes within Strawberry Alarm Clock began with drummer Randy Seol and bassist George Bunnell, who were both aboard for the group's first three albums, but departed after the release of their third album, The World in a Sea Shell, near the end of 1968. However, ex-manager Bill Holmes, who was fired for incompetency, offered the two former members, along with three other musicians, a deal to form another Strawberry Alarm Clock and tour under that moniker. After multiple legal disputes, in which Holmes eventually withdrew his version of the band, promoters were confused over which incarnation of the group was authentic, and refused to book either one. In the meantime, the band found replacements in singer/guitarist Jimmy Pitman and drummer Marty Katin. Pitman assumed duties as lead guitarist and Ed King moved over to bass guitar, which he had already played on some material on Strawberry Alarm Clock's second and third albums. Katin was unable to gel with the group and, without recording with the band, was replaced by Gene Gunnels, who had appeared on the number one hit "Incense and Peppermints".

Good Morning Starshine was the first album produced by the band members. According to keyboardist Mark Weitz, "It was the first time Ed and I produced an album without any help. I say Ed and I because we were interested in doing it, and worked well together, right down to the mixdowns. It was the first time either of us had the chance of really controlling the sound from beginning to end". With Pitman at the helm as one of the prime songwriters, the band began to branch out from their closely associated brand of psychedelic pop to a hard-edged take on blues rock. Pitman's twangy instrumentals and soulful vocals were, in part, a reason for their direction change. More importantly, the band had been lacking a hit single and had hopes that expressing their versatility would appeal to their fan base. Strawberry Alarm Clock did not totally depart from the sound featured on their past albums, as evident with the tracks "Small Package", "(You Put Me On) Stand By", and "Dear Joy".

Upon release, Good Morning Starshine failed to chart, though their title single managed to peak at number 87 on the Billboard Hot 100, but was severely out-charted by Oliver's version, which had reached number three. It was the only track not produced by the group, originating from the counterculture musical, Hair. As Weitz explains, "[UNI's] attitude at the time was, 'Let's give them one more chance to squeeze out a hit. If they fail, then it's over.' I think it was a miscalculation on 'Good Morning Starshine.' We played well on the music track, we all personally disliked the song as not being our style – that's an understatement – [but] recorded it anyway. Oliver's version came out before ours, and we were killed! That was the end of the line". Strawberry Alarm Clock released several additional non-album singles throughout 1969 and 1970, and appeared in the film, Beyond the Valley of the Dolls, but could never match their past popularity and disbanded from 1971 through 1974.

== Track listing ==
All tracks composed by Ed King, Gene Gunnels, Jimmy Pitman, Lee Freeman, Mark Weitz; except where indicated.

=== Side one ===
1. "Me and the Township" (Jimmy Pitman) – 3:14
2. "Off Ramp Road Tramp" – 4:15
3. "Small Package" – 3:58
4. "Hog Child" – 5:06
5. "Miss Attraction" – 4:27

=== Side two ===
1. "Good Morning Starshine" (Galt MacDermot, Gerome Ragni, James Rado) – 2:20
2. "Miss Attraction" – 2:39
3. "Write Your Name in Gold" (Jimmy Pitman) – 3:32
4. "(You Put Me On) Standby" – 2:20
5. "Dear Joy" (Jimmy Pitman) – 3:15
6. "Changes" – 5:15

=== 1997 Japanese CD reissue ===
The 1997 Japanese CD reissue contained seven extra tracks, mostly derived from non-album singles.

1. "Desiree" (Mark Weitz, Jimmy Pitman) – 3:03
2. "I Climbed the Mountain" (Carl Friberg, Ira Gasman) – 3:02
3. "Three" (Ed King, Lee Freeman) – 2:19
4. "Starting Out the Day" (Jimmy Pitman) – 2:41
5. "California Day" (Tom Jackman) – 2:46
6. "Girl from the City" (Paul Marshall) – 2:36
7. "Good Morning Starshine" [mono 45 mix] (Galt MacDermot, Gerome Ragni, James Rado) – 2:23

== Personnel ==
- Lee Freeman – rhythm guitar, bass guitar, harmonica, vocals
- Gene Gunnels – drums
- Ed King – bass guitar, guitar, backing vocals
- Jimmy Pitman – lead vocals, lead guitar
- Mark Weitz – keyboards, backing vocals
