= Wake Up...It's Tomorrow =

Studio album by Strawberry Alarm Clock
- Released: June 1968
- Recorded: 1967
- Studio: TTG Studios, Los Angeles, California
- Genre: Psychedelic rock; acid rock; psychedelic pop; jazz fusion
- Length: 36:04
- Label: Uni/Sundazed
- Producer: Frank Slay, Bill Holmes

Strawberry Alarm Clock chronology
Incense and Peppermints (1967)	Wake Up...It's Tomorrow (1968)	The World in a Sea Shell (1968)

Singles from Wake Up...It's Tomorrow
- 1. "Tomorrow" Released: 1967; 2. "Sit with the Guru" Released: 1968

Professional ratings
Review scores
Source	Rating
Allmusic	3.5/5 stars

Wake Up...It's Tomorrow is the second album by the American psychedelic rock band Strawberry Alarm Clock, released by Uni Records in 1968. It came as the group was challenged with continuing the success of their debut single, the psychedelic classic and number one hit, "Incense and Peppermints" and the LP that followed. Their second effort would expand upon the arrangements of its predecessor's unique blend of vocal harmonies, psychedelia, and pop music. In addition, the band's atypical lineup, which featured two bassists, would be altered to address studio and performing issues.

Upon release, Wake Up...It's Tomorrow failed to chart, though it is considered Strawberry Alarm Clock's apex of musical creativity, as the band members were free to pen the majority of the album's material. The pop-oriented song "Tomorrow" preceded the release of the album, earning the group their second and final Top 40 hit. An additional follow-up single, "Sit with the Guru", also charted on the Billboard Hot 100.

== Background ==
Prior to recording, bassist Gary Lovetro departed after being bought out for $25,000, leaving the position solely to George Bunnell. Regarding Lovetro's exit, keyboardist Mark Weitz explained, "Even though he was one of the original members [dating back to the days of Thee Sixpence, the band that evolved into the Strawberry Alarm Clock], we felt his interest in the band was more business-oriented than contributing musically. Sometimes guitarist Ed King had to do the bass parts in the studio for Gary. He just didn't have enough talent to conceive a good original bass part". Also virtually absent from Wake Up...It's Tomorrow was songwriter and occasional instrumentalist Steve Bartek, who was never an official member of Strawberry Alarm Clock, but played a pivotal role as a co-writer with Bunnell. However, Bartek was unable to formally join the fold and only penned one track, "Sitting on a Star", before excusing himself from any further involvement in the group.

Record sessions were conducted in the technologically advanced TTG Studios, with Uni Records more supportive of the band financially. The group's recording experience from their debut album enhanced their ability to work cohesively as songwriters and arrangers. As a result, all of Wake Up...It's Tomorrow's material was completed in studio, with a willingness to experiment with their repertoire. After the release of "Incense and Peppermints" did not credit Weitz and guitarist Ed King as the composers, the two aimed to validate their abilities as accomplished songwriters, which led to varying ideas from the two members. Included was The Association-inspired vocal harmonies organized by vocal coach, Howard Davis, exotic instrumental arrangements and a retention of Strawberry Alarm Clock's lighter pop numbers. The group began to factionalize according to their musical tastes, with King and rhythm guitarist Lee Freeman branching off from Weitz and drummer Randy Seol to write their own compositions.

Upon release, Wake Up...It's Tomorrow failed to chart nationally. However, it was arguably the most polished album of the band's entire recording career. Singles "Tomorrow" and "Sit with the Guru" fared better on the Billboard Hot 100, where they charted at number 23 and number 65, respectively. The B-side "Pretty Song from Psych-Out" achieved wide exposure for being featured as the theme song in the film Psych-Out. King reasoned that distribution of the album came too late to capitalize on the success of "Tomorrow", and that it was poorly advertised by Uni Records. In part, it was a consequence of the band's manager, Bill Holmes, attempting to retain control of the group by refusing promotional assistance from Uni executives.

== Track listing ==
=== Original LP ===
Side one
No.	Title	Writer(s)	Length
1.	"Nightmare of Percussion"	George Bunnell, Howard Davis, Randy Seol	2:57
2.	"Soft Skies, No Lies"	Ed King, Lee Freeman	3:07
3.	"Tomorrow"	King, Mark Weitz	2:14
4.	"They Saw the Fat One Coming"	King, Lee Freeman	3:25
5.	"Curse of the Witches"	Bunnell, Seol	6:46

Side two
No.	Title	Writer(s)	Length
1.	"Sit with the Guru"	King, Weitz, Roy Freeman	2:59
2.	"Go Back (You're Going the Wrong Way)"	King, Lee Freeman, Weitz	2:19
3.	"Pretty Song from Psych-Out"	King, Lee Freeman	3:15
4.	"Sitting on a Star"	Bunnell, Seol, Steve Bartek	2:55
5.	"Black Butter, Past"	King, Davis, Lee Freeman	2:23
6.	"Black Butter, Present"	King, Lee Freeman	2:10
7.	"Black Butter, Future"	King, Davis, Lee Freeman	1:32

1997 Japan CD reissue bonus tracks
No.	Title	Writer(s)	Length
13.	"Tomorrow (mono single mix)"	King, Weitz	2:13
14.	"Sit with the Guru (mono single mix)"	King, Weitz, Roy Freeman	3:01

== Personnel ==
Strawberry Alarm Clock

- Mark Weitz – keyboards, vocals
- Randy Seol – drums, vibraphone, glockenspiel, marimba, keyboards, percussion, vocals
- Ed King – lead guitar, bass guitar, vocals
- Lee Freeman – rhythm guitar, sitar, vocals
- George Bunnell – bass guitar, vocals

Additional personnel

- Frank Slay – producer
- Bill Holmes – producer
- Steve Bartek – flute (uncredited)
- Howard Davis – vocal arrangements, spoken passage on "Nightmare of Percussion"
- Paul Buff – engineer
- Jack Hunt – engineer
- Don Weller – liner assemblage
- Gene Brownell – photographer
