= Sitar in Western popular music =

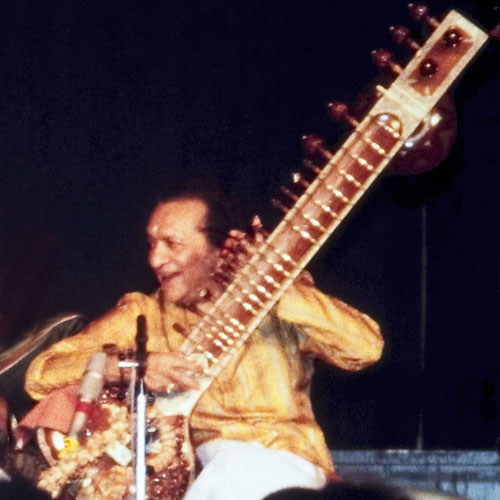
Ravi Shankar, a master of the instrument, was the first to make inroads into Western culture with the sitar.

The use of the sitar in Western popular music arose in the 1960s due to experimentation by various rock bands such as The Beatles, The Kinks, and The Rolling Stones, While the sitar had earlier been used in jazz and Indian film music, it was from the 1960s onwards that various pop artists in the Western world began to experiment with incorporating the sitar, a classical Indian stringed instrument, within their compositions. The introduction of the sitar into popular music exposed many Westerners to Indian musical traditions.

== Early uses in Western pop music ==
The use of sitar in popular music started amongst British invasion rock bands in the 1960s. Cultural exchange between India and Britain was common due to the British Raj and subsequent Indian immigration, making Indian music more familiar to British artists and culture. Before the sitar was first used on a Western pop recording, the instrument's drone had been imitated on electric guitar by the Kinks on their 1965 single "See My Friends". Another English band, the Yardbirds, hired a sitar player to play the main riff on their song "Heart Full of Soul", but the group subsequently re-recorded the track without a sitar part. The first pop release to actually feature a sitar was The Beatles' "Norwegian Wood (This Bird Has Flown)", released on their album Rubber Soul in December 1965. The sitar was played by George Harrison, making him the first Western musician to play an Indian instrument on a commercial recording.

Harrison is recognized as having introduced the sitar to pop music due to the Beatles' popularity and cultural influence. He claimed to have first picked up a sitar on the set of the Beatles' 1965 film Help!, although this has been disputed. Harrison went on to write and record "Love You To" for the Beatles' 1966 album Revolver, which was Harrison's first song entirely composed on sitar. He went on to compose a number of songs using the sitar, including "Within You Without You", which features other Indian instruments such as tabla, swarmandal, tanpura, and dilruba. Following the disbandment of the Beatles, Harrison continued to work with the sitar and remained in touch with Shankar, with Shankar joining Harrison on stage at his 1971 Concert for Bangladesh.

In August 1966, Donovan, a Scottish folk singer, released his sitar-centered album Sunshine Superman, featuring Shawn Phillips on sitar. In early 1966, Rolling Stones guitarist Brian Jones played sitar on "Paint It Black", having received tuition from another protégé of Shankar, Harihar Rao. Jones also used sitar on some tracks on the Rolling Stones' 1967 album Their Satanic Majesties Request. He again played the instrument on "My Little One" in an October 1967 recording session with Jimi Hendrix, as well as tambura on the Stones' 1968 single "Street Fighting Man".

== Widespread popularity, 1966–1968 ==
Shankar credited Harrison with inspiring "the great sitar explosion" in the West, as many rock guitarists similarly adopted the instrument. A fad for sitars in pop songs soon developed, facilitated by the Danelectro Company's 1967 introduction of the first "electric sitar", known as the "Coral Electric Sitar". This instrument was an electric guitar with a distinctive sitar-like sound, rather than an acoustic sitar of the type traditionally made in India. As the electric sitar was much easier to play than the traditional version, it quickly became the preferred choice of many rock musicians. Guitarists such as Harrison, Jones, Phillips, and Big Jim Sullivan were more dedicated in their approach as sitarists, however. Author Peter Lavezzoli also highlights Traffic's Dave Mason as a guitarist who displayed an obvious skill as a sitar player.

From 1966 onwards, hundreds of songs by pop artists featured sitar. The late 1960s saw the release of songs featuring the sitar that included Ricky Nelson's "Marshmallow Skies", Scott McKenzie's "San Francisco", The Cyrkle's "Turn-Down Day", The Cowsills' "The Rain, the Park, and Other Things", John Fred and His Playboy Band's "Judy in Disguise (With Glasses)", The Turtles "Sound Asleep", The Stone Poneys "Evergreen", First Edition "Just Dropped In (To See What Condition My Condition Was In)", The Chocolate Watch Band's "In the Past", The Box Tops' "Cry Like a Baby" (electric sitar), The Lemon Pipers' "Green Tambourine" (electric sitar), Traffic's "Paper Sun" and "Hole In My Shoe", Tomorrow's "Real Life Permanent Dream" and July's "The Way".

Elvis Presley had several recordings that feature the electric sitar. These include a 1967 cover of Tommy Tucker's R&B classic "Hi-Heel Sneakers", Mort Shuman's "You'll Think of Me" (1969), Percy Mayfield's "Stranger in My Own Home Town" (1969) and a cover of the Anne Murray country song "Snowbird" (1970). On "Hi-Heel Sneakers" and "Snowbird", the parts were played by session guitarist Harold Bradley, while Reggie Young played the instrument on "You'll Think of Me" and "Stranger in My Own Home Town".

The Mamas & The Papas included the sitar on tracks such as "People Like Us", "Snowqueen Of Texas', "Lady Genevieve", "I Wanna Be a Star" and "Grasshopper", and Sergio Mendes & Brazil '66 used it on “Chove Chuva”. Eric Burdon and the Animals played the instrument in the songs "Winds of Change", "No Self Pity", "Orange and Red Beams", "All Is One", "We Love You Lil" and "Monterey". The Strawberry Alarm Clock use the sitar in songs such as "An Angry Young Man", "Black Butter-Present" and "Sit with the Guru". Although often overlooked, some of the most extensive users of the instrument in contemporary music were Mike Heron and Robin Williamson of The Incredible String Band, combining folk, psychedelia with eastern influences in the songs "The Song Has No Ending Parts 1–9", "The Mad Hatter's Song" and "The Iron Stone". Steve Miller Band used sitar in their song "Wild Mountain Honey".

Art-rock bands such as The Moody Blues used the sitar on a few albums, particularly In Search of the Lost Chord. The Pretty Things' album S.F. Sorrow also featured the instrument on a few tracks, as did Procol Harum's song "In Held 'Twas In I", on the segment "Glimpses of Nirvana". Jethro Tull used the sitar on "Fat Man" and "Skating Away on the Thin Ice of the New Day", and the Strawbs included the instrument on many of their recordings. Family used sitar in the song "Face in the Cloud", released on the band's 1969 album Family Entertainment.

Donovan's hit song "Hurdy Gurdy Man" used a tambura, which can also be heard on songs such as "Sunny South Kensington", "Breezes of Patchouli", "Celeste", "Guinevere", "Three King Fishers", "Ferris Wheel" and "Fat Angel". Roy Wood from The Move played sitar on "Night of Fear" using the same riffs as Tchaikovsky's "1812 Overture", as well as the electric sitar on "Open up said the world at the door". The Dutch band Shocking Blue used the sitar in many of their songs, most prominently in "Love Buzz", "Acka Raga", "Water Boy", "Hot Sand" and "I'm A Woman". Richie Havens made extensive use of the sitar in the title track of his second album, Something Else Again. Blue Cheer used both sitar and tabla in their song "Babji (Twilight Raga)".

== Subsequent usage ==
Although the sitar craze had died down by 1970, its distinctive sound had become an indelible part of pop music. Genesis used the electric sitar on "I Know What I Like (In Your Wardrobe)", from their fifth album Selling England by the Pound. Steve Howe of Yes used an electric sitar on the band's album Close to the Edge.

Tom Petty and the Heartbreakers used a guitar fitted with a harpsichord device to simulate a sitar for their 1985 hit "Don't Come Around Here No More". John Renbourn used the instrument prominently during his time with the folk band Pentangle, on songs such as "Once I Had a Sweetheart", "House Carpenter", "Cruel Sister", "Rain and Snow", and "The Snows". Metallica used an electric sitar during the intro of their 1991 song "Wherever I May Roam". Beck also used a sitar on his 1993 hit "Loser".

The sitar is not a regular staple in country music, but it can be heard in Hank Williams Jr.’s "A Country Boy Can Survive" off his 1981 studio album The Pressure Is On, and was played by Reggie Young.

Although his period of dedicated sitar study ended in 1968, Harrison continued to champion Indian classical music. In addition to producing recordings by Shankar, Harrison included sitar in "When We Was Fab" and other songs from his solo career, as well as in the Traveling Wilburys' 1990 track "The Devil's Been Busy".

From the 2010s on, there are still examples of pop artists using the sitar in their music. The sitar is featured prominently in the music of the 2010s Japanese neo-psychedelic band Kikagaku Moyo, played by Ryu Kurosawa. Stu Mackenzie of Australian psychedelic rock band King Gizzard & the Lizard Wizard played sitar on the band's 2013 album Float Along – Fill Your Lungs. Also in 2013, Katy Perry included the sitar on the track "Legendary Lovers" from the album Prism. The Jack Antonoff-fronted band Bleachers utilized an electric sitar on their 2017 single "Don't Take The Money", which features Lorde on backup vocals. Pop/rock artist St. Vincent used the electric sitar in "Down," a single from her 2021 album Daddy’s Home.

== Examples ==
- Behind the Sun - Red Hot Chili Peppers
- Runaway - Janet Jackson
- Colour My World - Petula Clark
- Can't Lose You – Type O Negative
- Captain of Your Ship – Reparata and the Delrons (electric sitar)
- Carpet Man – The 5th Dimension
- Chrome Sitar – T. Rex
- "Come and Get Your Love" – Redbone
- Do It Again – Denny Dias / Steely Dan (electric sitar)
- Every Time You Go Away – Paul Young
- Greed – Tomi Koivusaari - Amorphis
- Holiday Inn – Elton John
- Hooked On a Feeling – B.J. Thomas
- Living on the Ceiling - Blancmange (band)
- Mausam and Escape – Asad Khan (Slumdog Millionaire: Music from the Motion Picture)
- Legendary Lovers – Katy Perry
- Metal Heart – Accept
- Om – Moody Blues
- Pretty Tied Up – Izzy Stradlin / Guns N' Roses
- Rolling Home - John Martyn
- Signed, Sealed, Delivered, I'm Yours – Stevie Wonder
- The Devil's Been Busy - Traveling Wilburys
- Transdermal Celebration and Tried and True – Ween (electric sitar)
- When We Was Fab – George Harrison
- Band of Gold – Freda Payne
- Didn't I (Blow Your Mind This Time) – The Delfonics
- Cry Like a Baby – The Box Tops
- Love Will Lead You Back – Taylor Dayne
- Glass Hammer regularly uses electric sitar in their songs since the addition of guitarist and sitarist Kamran Alan Shikoh to their line-up in 2009
- Blackbird - Bosco and Peck - 2012
- Down – St. Vincent
- Don’t Take The Money - Bleachers
- The Rolling Stones - Paint it Black
- Root Of All Evil - Daniel Caesar
- Twenties - Giveon
- Someone’s Missing - MGMT
- Orange County - Gorillaz (feat. Bizarrap, Kara Jackson, Anoushka Shankar)

== See also ==
- Indo jazz
- Psychedelic music
- Psychedelic rock
- Raga rock
- Sitar in jazz
- Sitarla

== Sources ==
- Bellman, Jonathan (1998). The Exotic in Western Music. Lebanon, New Hampshire: UPNE. ISBN 1-55553-319-1.
- Brend, Mark (2005). Strange Sounds: Offbeat Instruments and Sonic Experiments in Pop. San Francisco, CA: Backbeat Books. ISBN 978-0-879308551.
- Hunt, Ken (2000). "Meetings by the River". World Music: The Rough Guide (Volume 2: Latin and North America, Caribbean, India, Asia and Pacific). London: Rough Guides/Penguin. ISBN 1-85828-636-0.
- Lavezzoli, Peter (2006). The Dawn of Indian Music in the West. New York, NY: Continuum. ISBN 0-8264-2819-3.
