= Good Morning Starshine (Oliver album) =

Studio album by Oliver
- Released: 1969
- Genre: Pop rock
- Label: Crewe Records
- Producer: Bob Crewe

Oliver chronology
Good Morning Starshine (1969)	Oliver Again (1970)

Singles from Good Morning Starshine
- 1. "Good Morning Starshine" Released: 1969; 2. "Jean" Released: 1969

Good Morning Starshine is the first studio album by pop rock singer Oliver released in 1969.

The album reached No. 19 on the Billboard 200. Its title track hit No. 3 on both the Adult Contemporary chart and the Billboard Hot 100. The single "Jean" hit No. 1 on the Adult Contemporary chart and No. 2 on the Billboard Hot 100.

== Track listing ==
1. "Who Will Buy?" (Lionel Bart)
2. "The Arrangement" (Oliver)
3. "Can't You See" (Oliver)
4. "Letmekissyouwithadream" (Oliver)
5. "Ruby Tuesday" (Jagger/Richards)
6. "Jean" (Rod McKuen)
7. "Good Morning Starshine" (James Rado, Gerome Ragni, Galt MacDermot)
8. "In My Life" (Lennon/McCartney)
9. "Where Is Love?" (Lionel Bart)
10. "Both Sides Now" (Joni Mitchell)

== Charts ==
Album

Year	Chart	Peak Position
1969	Billboard 200	19

Singles

Year	Single	Chart	Peak Position
1969	"Good Morning Starshine"	Adult Contemporary	3
1969	"Good Morning Starshine"	Billboard Hot 100	3
1969	"Jean"	Adult Contemporary	1
1969	"Jean"	Billboard Hot 100	2
