= Strictly from hunger =

Strictly from hunger (also just from hunger) was a twentieth century American idiom meaning "of poor quality".

Strictly From Hunger may refer to:

- Strictly From Hunger, a 1937 collection of New Yorker pieces by the American humorist S. J. Perelman
- Strictly From Hunger, a 1968 album by the American psychedelic band Hunger
- Strictly From Hunger, a 2004 album by the American fusion musician John Michael
