= Again (Oliver album) =

Studio album by Oliver
- Released: 1970
- Genre: Pop rock
- Label: Crewe Records
- Producer: Bob Crewe

Oliver chronology
Good Morning Starshine (1969)	Again (1970)	Prisms (1971)

Professional ratings
Review scores
Source	Rating
AllMusic	3/5 stars

Again is the second studio album by the pop rock singer Oliver, released in 1970.

The album reached number 71 on the Billboard 200. The single "Angelica" reached number 26 on the Adult Contemporary chart and number 97 on the Billboard Hot 100. "I Can Remember" reached number 24 on the Adult Contemporary chart. The song "Young Birds Fly", which was written by Oliver himself, was recorded as a single by The Cryan' Shames back in 1968, reaching number 99 on the Billboard Hot 100 and number 86 on the Cashbox chart. Oliver's own version was not released as a single.

== Track listing ==
1. "The Twelfth of Never" (Jerry Livingston, Paul Francis Webster)
2. "Comfort Me" (Oliver)
3. "Young Birds Fly" (Oliver)
4. "Until It's Time for You to Go" (Buffy Sainte-Marie)
5. "Leaving on a Jet Plane" (John Denver)
6. "I Can Remember" (Gary Illingworth, Myrna March, Richard Grasso)
7. "The Picture of Kathleen Dunne" (L. Russell Brown, Raymond Bloodworth)
8. "Buddy" (Oliver)
9. "If You Go Away" (Jacques Brel, Rod McKuen)
10. "Angelica" (Barry Mann, Cynthia Weil)

== Charts ==
Album

Year	Chart	Peak Position
1970	Billboard 200	71

Singles

Year	Single	Chart	Peak Position
1970	"I Can Remember"	Adult Contemporary	24
1970	"Angelica"	Adult Contemporary	26
1970	"Angelica"	Billboard Hot 100	97
