= Good Morning Starshine =

Single by Oliver

from the album Good Morning Starshine
- B-side: "Can't You See"
- Released: May 1969
- Genre: Pop
- Length: 3:39
- Label: Jubilee
- Songwriters: James Rado, Gerome Ragni, Galt MacDermot
- Producer: Bob Crewe

Oliver singles chronology
"Good Morning Starshine" (1969)	"Jean" (1969)

"Good Morning Starshine" is a pop song from the musical Hair (1967). It was a No. 3 hit in the United States in July 1969, and a No. 6 hit in the United Kingdom in October 1969, for the singer Oliver.

== Background ==
"Good Morning Starshine" is a song from the second act of the musical Hair (1967). It is performed by the character Sheila, played off-Broadway in 1967 by Jill O'Hara, and by Lynn Kellogg in the original 1968 Broadway production. In the 1979 film version of the musical, Sheila is portrayed by Beverly D'Angelo.

The chorus of the song makes extensive use of apparent nonsense words: "Glibby gloop gloopy, Nibby Nabby Noopy, La La La Lo Lo. Sabba Sibby Sabba, Nooby abba Nabba Le Le Lo Lo. Tooby ooby walla, nooby abba nabba, Early mornin' singin' song."

== Chart performance ==
=== Weekly charts ===
Chart (1969)	Peak position
Australia (Go-Set)	8
Australia KMR	10
Canada RPM Adult Contemporary	1
Canada RPM Top Singles	1
Ireland (IRMA)	2
New Zealand (Listener)	2
South Africa (Springbok Radio)	6
UK	6
U.S. Billboard Hot 100	3
U.S. Billboard Easy Listening	3
U.S. Cash Box Top 100	4

=== Year-end charts ===
Chart (1969)	Rank
Canada Top Singles (RPM)	33
U.S. Billboard Hot 100	43
U.S. Adult Contemporary (Billboard)	24

== Other versions ==
- Andy Williams with the Osmond Brothers, Get Together with Andy Williams (1969)
- Gary Lewis and the Playboys, Rhythm of the Rain (1969)
- Strawberry Alarm Clock, Good Morning Starshine (1969)
- Chris Clark, CC Rides Again (1969)
- Björn Skifs (1969) (as "God morgon stjärnljus") scoring a Svensktoppen hit for two weeks.
- Tartaglia, Good Morning Starshine (instrumental) (1969)
- Bob McGrath performed "Good Morning Starshine" with a group of hippie Muppets in the third episode of Sesame Street (1969)
- Roger Whittaker, The Last Farewell (1971)
- Lars Lönndahl (1971) (as "God morgon stjärnljus") scoring a 1972 Svensktoppen hit for two weeks.
- Elaine Paige, Stages (1983)
- Anna-Lotta Larsson (2004, as "God morgon stjärnljus")
