= Where's One? =

2026 album by Strawberry Alarm Clock

Where's One? is the sixth studio album by the American psychedelic rock band Strawberry Alarm Clock. The album was released August 7, 2026, through Big Stir Records. The songs "Monster", "Blow Your Mind", "The Sky Isn't Falling", and "Live Water" were released as singles.

== Reception ==
Writing for Americana Highways, John Apice concluded his review by saying, "This isn’t your grandfather’s pop group. They’ve come of age. And no, they’re not cheese. Wine maybe, because they’ve been kept in a cask all these years. Good vintage."

James Broscheid of The Big Takeover wrote that the album "retains the band’s inherent sense of whimsy and human vulnerability. It stands as a testament to lifelong creative partnerships, proving that the search for the elusive musical center remains just as vital for Strawberry Alarm Clock today as it did at the dawn of their career" and praised the album's closing track "Galactic Symphony = Persian Skies" as "a fitting culmination to an album that functions less as a retrospective and more as an ongoing exploration."

Bill Kopp of Musoscribe called the cover of "Day Tripper" "effectively an instrumental, and an inventive, muscular one at that", and called it "a fine record" that might be one of his album of the year picks.

Writing for The Aquarian, Jeff Burger called the album "excellent" and wrote, "The group’s penchant for psychedelia remains obvious throughout, but its sound, which incorporates elements of dream pop and power pop, has become much more complex and sophisticated."

== Track listing ==
No.	Title	Writer(s)	Length
1.	"Feel The Love"	Howie Anderson	0:44
2.	"Monsters"		5:20
3.	"Day Tripper"	Lennon-McCartney	3:29
4.	"White Light"		3:35
5.	"Blow Your Mind"		3:57
6.	"I'm Not the One"	Howie Anderson	4:40
7.	"Within You Without You"	George Harrison	3:21
8.	"Since You Have Gone Away"	Howie Anderson	4:49
9.	"Live Water"		5:15
10.	"Primordial Soup"		4:02
11.	"The Sky Isn't Falling"	Howie Anderson	4:35
12.	"Tahitian Gardens"		7:38
13.	"Galactic Symphony - Persian Skies"		4:56
