= Strawberry Alarm Clock =

American psychedelic band

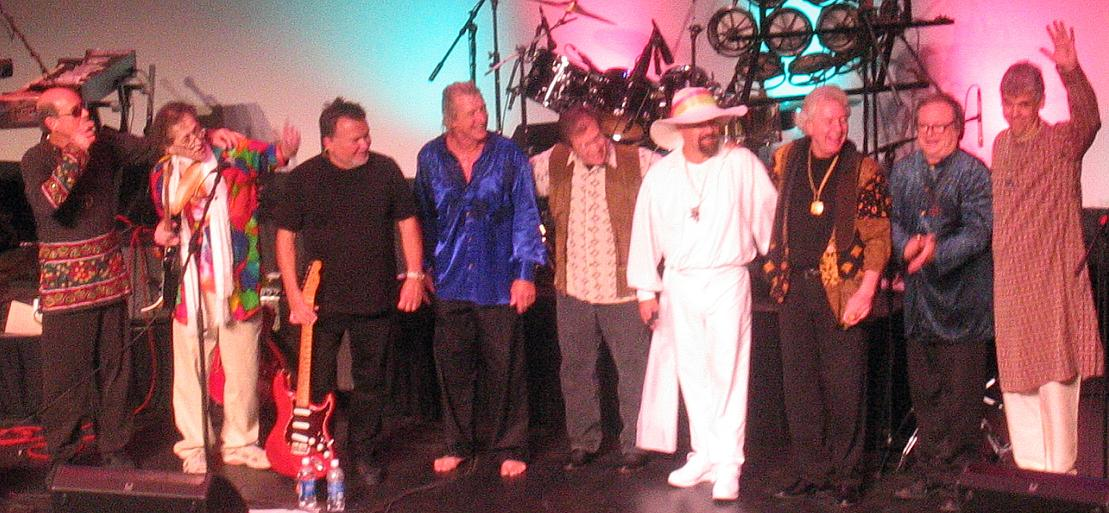
- Strawberry Alarm Clock in 2007

Background information
- Origin: Glendale, California, United States
- Genres: Rock; pop; psychedelia; sunshine pop; acid rock
- Years active: 1967–1972; 1974–present
- Labels: Uni Records; Global Recording Artists
- Spinoff of: Thee Sixpence; Waterfyrd Traene
- Members: Gene Gunnels; Randy Seol; Mark Weitz; George Bunnell; Steve Bartek; Howie Anderson
- Past members: Lee Freeman; Ed King; Gary Lovetro; Greg Munford; Marty Katon; Jimmy Pitman; Paul Marshall; Leo Gaffney; Doug Freeman; Peter Wasner; James Harrah; Clay Bernard; Bob Caloca; Bruce Hubbard; Jon Walmsley; Glenn Brigman
- Website: strawberryalarmclock.com

Strawberry Alarm Clock is an American psychedelic band formed in 1967, originating in Glendale, California, a city about ten miles north of downtown Los Angeles. The band is best known for its 1967 hit single "Incense and Peppermints." Their music is categorized as acid rock, psychedelic pop, and sunshine pop, and they charted five songs in the United States and Canada, including two Top 40 hits.

== Career ==
=== 1966–1967: Formation and early success ===
A history of the band written by George Bunnell states that "The Strawberry Alarm Clock came about by parts of two bands, Thee Sixpence and Waterfyrd Traene, morphing into one." The group, originally named Thee Sixpence, initially consisted of Ed King (lead guitar, vocals), Michael Luciano (vocals), Lee Freeman (rhythm guitar, harmonica, vocals), Gary Lovetro (bass), Steve Rabe (guitar, vocals), and Gene Gunnels (drums). Randy Seol (drums, vibes, percussion, vocals) and Mark Weitz (keyboards, vocals) joined to replace the departing Gunnels, Rabe, and Luciano just as the name change to Strawberry Alarm Clock was occurring. Seol eventually brought in songwriters Bunnell and Steve Bartek, who participated in the writing and recording of Strawberry Alarm Clock's first album.

The inception of Strawberry Alarm Clock, aside from Thee Sixpence, is not well documented, largely because none of the latter band's recordings (subsequently lost) were released. However, according to Bunnell, many Strawberry Alarm Clock songs came from the band he had formed previously with Seol, Bartek, Randy Zacuto, Fred Schwartz, and Criss Jay, which performed under the names Waterfyrd Traene (pre-Strawberry Alarm Clock), Public Bubble (during Strawberry Alarm Clock), and Buffington Rhodes (post-Strawberry Alarm Clock). There were two recording sessions with some of these personnel: one with Dave Hassinger at the Recording Factory and one with Bill Lazarus at Sunset Sound. There were probably ten songs in all that were recorded, but Bunnell stated that both masters were stolen. The post-Strawberry Alarm Clock incarnation broke up before any success was realized.

The fourth and most famous single by Strawberry Alarm Clock was "Incense and Peppermints", produced by Frank Slay. The song was initially released as a B-side by Thee Sixpence on All American Records, which was owned by Bill Holmes, the band's manager and producer. The band was not impressed by the vocals of songwriter John Carter, so Slay chose Greg Munford, a 16-year-old friend of the band from another group called Shapes of Sound, to sing lead on the track. The Uni Records subsidiary of MCA picked up the record for national distribution, and the single was re-released in May 1967 with "Incense and Peppermints" as the A-side. The song reached No. 1 on the Billboard Hot 100 during the week ending November 25, 1967. The band made a cameo appearance performing the song in the Richard Rush film Psych-Out.

Slay refused to give Weitz and King (also a member of Hunger) credit for writing the song, stating that they did not write either the melody line or lyrics, even though the song was built on an instrumental by Weitz with a bridge by King. This instrumental was originally intended as a B-side to "The Birdman of Alkatrash", which ultimately became the B-side to "Incense and Peppermints". The single spent one week at No. 1 and remained on the charts for a total of 16 weeks. A gold disc was awarded for sales of one million copies by the Recording Industry Association of America on December 19, 1967.

Shortly after recording "Incense and Peppermints", the band added Bunnell (on bass, rhythm guitar, and vocals) before making their first album. Also titled Incense and Peppermints, it reached No. 11 on the US album chart in late 1967. Bunnell would also become their main songwriter. Some early Strawberry Alarm Clock songs were written by Bunnell with Bartek. The latter played flute on the first two Strawberry Alarm Clock albums and would remain involved with the band's later lineups. Bartek later joined The Mystic Knights of the Oingo Boingo and orchestrated Boingo frontman Danny Elfman's film scores.

In November 1967, and again in April 1968, Strawberry Alarm Clock toured on a bill with the Beach Boys and Buffalo Springfield. During the April leg of the tour, several dates in the South were canceled following the assassination of Martin Luther King Jr. in Memphis, Tennessee on April 4, 1968. Ed King said that the band all acquired handguns after King's death for the remaining shows in the South, and that he carried his in his waistband onstage.

In their early days of touring, the band members would often sit on "magic carpets" as their roadies carried them to the stage. Drummer Seol would rig up wrist gas jets to give the illusion that he was playing the bongos and vibes with his hands on fire, until the gimmick became too dangerous.

=== 1968–1969: Lineup changes ===
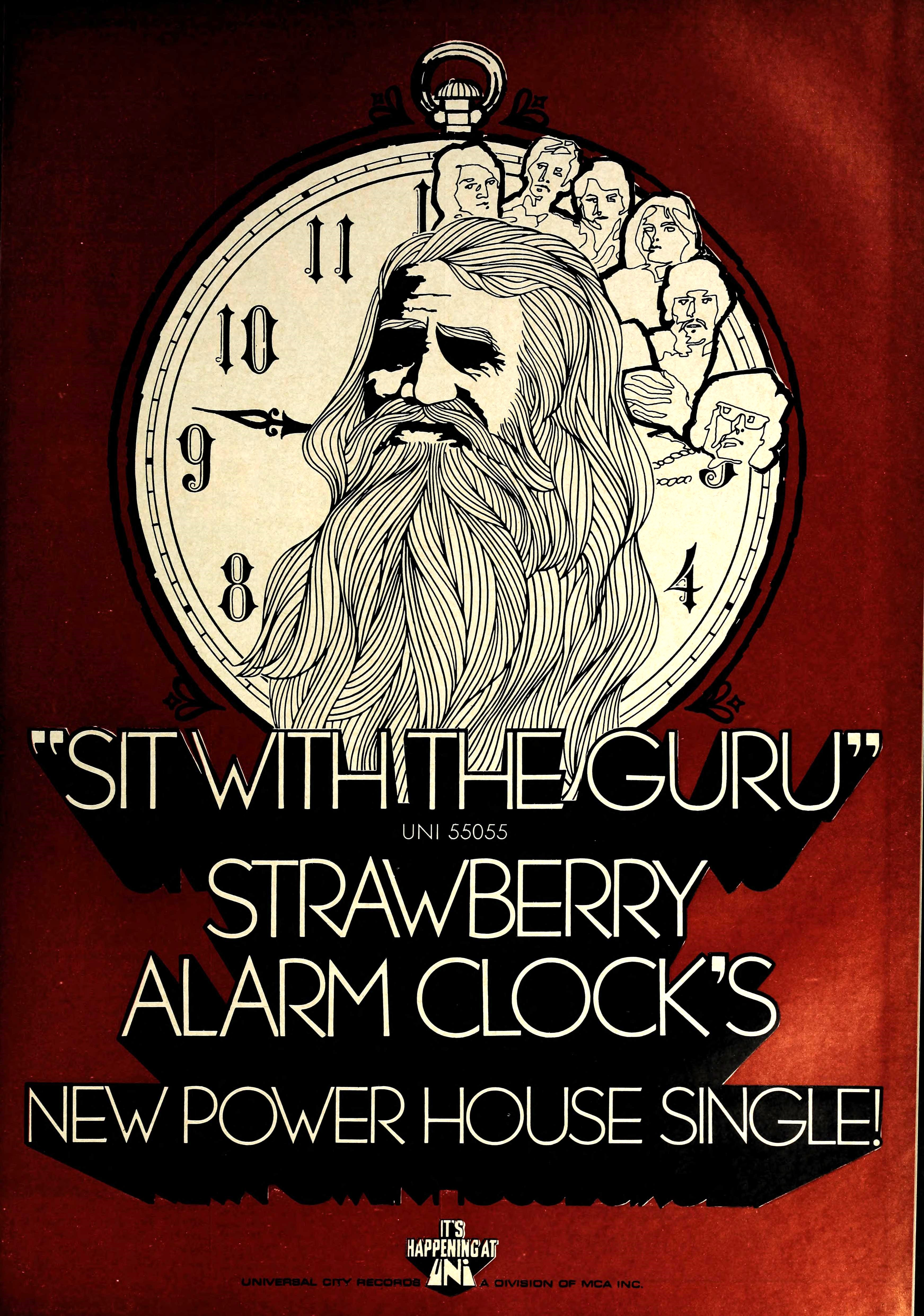
Cashbox advertisement, March 16, 1968

During Strawberry Alarm Clock's short lifespan, the band underwent numerous lineup changes. As Bunnell became the primary songwriter, he began playing more of the bass parts, as he was already familiar with the songs. Original bassist Lovetro gradually transitioned into the role of road manager, but was eventually bought out of the group after conflicts with the others before the release of the second album, Wake Up...It's Tomorrow. The album’s single, "Tomorrow", was a minor hit and their only other Top 40 appearance, reaching No. 23 in early 1968. The second album also benefited from vocal coach Howard Davis, who was brought in to help the members elevate the harmony singing featured on Incense and Peppermints to new levels of sophistication.

Later 1968 singles included "Sit with the Guru" (charting at No. 65) and "Barefoot in Baltimore" (which peaked at No. 67 and was later included on their … Wake Up…It’s Tomorrow album). The latter song was especially popular in its namesake city of Baltimore, Maryland, in the counterculture neighborhood of Mount Vernon-Belvedere. The tune received considerable airplay on local Baltimore radio stations and was even occasionally used as a theme song for the city's image in later decades.

Bunnell and Seol left the band in late 1968 at the end of the sessions for The World in a Sea Shell due to disagreements over their manager Bill Holmes' mishandling of the band's business affairs. Bunnell, Seol, and Bartek then formed a new band, Buffington Rhodes. Holmes was fired by the remaining members, but he retaliated by creating an alternate version of Strawberry Alarm Clock (featuring Bunnell and Seol) and sending them on tour. The band responded with an injunction against Holmes, and the Los Angeles County Superior Court subsequently barred him from using the band's name to start a rival group.

Drummer Marty Katon then joined, along with new lead singer/guitarist Jimmy Pitman (formerly of the Nightcrawlers), and the band shifted to a more blues rock style. King moved to bass, as he had been playing many of the bass parts in the studio. In early 1969, original "Incense and Peppermints" drummer Gunnels rejoined Strawberry Alarm Clock, replacing Katon. Pitman left in July 1969 after the Good Morning Starshine album failed to sell. He was succeeded by Paul Marshall, who would stay with the group until they disbanded temporarily in 1971. The title track, "Good Morning Starshine", peaked at No. 87 in 1969 but was eclipsed by Oliver's more successful version. Weitz quit in December 1969, and the group continued as a quartet with King, Freeman, Gunnels, and Marshall.

=== 1970–1981: Brief breakup and reunion ===
In 1970, the band appeared in the Russ Meyer cult classic film Beyond the Valley of the Dolls. By this time, their popularity had waned considerably, but they continued touring the South in 1970 and 1971, with an unknown Florida band called Lynyrd Skynyrd opening for them. In early 1972, with no record label and internal conflicts over musical direction, the group decided to disband. Lead guitarist King chose to relocate to the South, while Gunnels joined the backup band for the Everly Brothers, along with Waddy Wachtel and Warren Zevon. During the tour with Lynyrd Skynyrd, King had expressed interest in joining the band to vocalist Ronnie Van Zant, and he accepted an invitation to join in November 1972. King would later compose the classic opening riff to the band's biggest hit, "Sweet Home Alabama", released in 1974.

Strawberry Alarm Clock reunited in 1974 with Bunnell, Seol, and Bartek. The trio performed a few shows and contributed the theme song to the late-night 1970s televised rock concert series ABC in Concert. They also appeared on one of the smaller stages at the first California Jam on April 6, 1974.

=== 1982–2001: Reunion and alternative lineup ===
Strawberry Alarm Clock reunited once again in 1982 after guitarist Freeman spotted a newspaper ad promoting an appearance by the group at a Los Angeles club, The Music Machine. Freeman knew nothing about this gig and went to the club to investigate. There he discovered that the advertisement had actually been a plot by the club's owners to get the real band to reunite. At this point, Freeman, Bunnell, Weitz, and Gunnells reformed as Strawberry Alarm Clock. They were joined in 1983 by singer Leo Gaffney and Freeman's brother, Doug.

By 1983, the Strawberry Alarm Clock lineup was Freeman, Bunnell, Peter Wasner (keyboards), and James Harrah (guitar). "Incense and Peppermints" was re-recorded the same year with a lineup of Freeman, Bunnell, Harrah, Bartek, and Clay Bernard (keyboards), with Bob Caloca on lead vocals. The remake was produced by Dennis Dragon (brother of Daryl Dragon), who also played percussion on the track.

Freeman, Bunnell, Harrah, and Bernard continued on, with Seol rejoining. Seol left again in 1984, and Harrah and Bernard were replaced by actor/musician Jon Walmsley (guitar, keyboards, vocals). Bruce Hubbard, who had earlier played with Bunnell in Buffington Roads, took over percussion duties. Walmsley was out by 1986, replaced by guitarist Howie Anderson along with a returning Bernard. Anderson also handled keyboard parts via his synth guitar after Bernard left once again, this time to relocate to New Mexico at the end of the 1980s.

The band began performing on oldies concert tours during the 1980s, often alongside other late-1960s acts such as Moby Grape, the Seeds, and It's a Beautiful Day. The Freeman/Bunnell/Hubbard/Anderson lineup became their longest-lasting, continuing from 1989 to 2001. During this period, members worked on new material, made occasional concert appearances, and pursued other individual careers.

Meanwhile, in 1982, late-1960s Strawberry Alarm Clock member Pitman was performing with a band called Thunderchicken in Salt Lake City, Utah, and decided to form his own version of Strawberry Alarm Clock. He teamed up with Preston Kofoed (bass), Mordecai Noble (guitar), Dave Stone (keyboards), and Dave "Plumb" Derrick (drums). This version of the group played a benefit for the Veterans of the Vietnam War at New Faces Roadhouse and toured extensively throughout the western US before disbanding a few years later in Jackson, Wyoming.

=== 2001–present: New album ===
On June 16, 2001, the group performed at a concert at San Diego's Balboa Park, sharing the stage with Moby Grape, Jefferson Starship, Iron Butterfly, Big Brother and the Holding Company, and Country Joe McDonald. Seol and Gunnels joined Freeman, Bunnell, Anderson, and Hubbard for this show.

On October 23, 2003, the same lineup was joined by Bartek and Marshall for an appearance at Amoeba Records in Hollywood to celebrate the DVD release of Beyond the Valley of the Dolls.

In December 2004, Weitz and King were slated to reunite with Seol, Freeman, and Bunnell, along with original "Incense" singer Munford, for a PBS special on 1960s-era rock music; however, the band did not appear. Bunnell later stated in interviews that PBS never sent the proper contracts to the band.

By 2006, Weitz, Bartek, Bunnell, Seol, and Anderson were back performing shows with the group. King, Freeman, Marshall, and Gunnels joined them for a performance at the Virginia Theatre in Champaign, Illinois, on April 29, 2007. This event was part of the last day of Roger Ebert's ninth annual Roger Ebert's Overlooked Film Festival, and it was preceded by a screening of Beyond the Valley of the Dolls (co-written by Ebert and director Russ Meyer). Freeman, Weitz, Bartek, Bunnell, Seol, Gunnels, and Anderson continued to make concert appearances throughout 2007.

By 2008, an ailing Freeman was sidelined, and in 2010, Bartek began to reduce his appearances with the group.

In January 2010, Strawberry Alarm Clock started recording new material for a record label created by Billy Corgan of the Smashing Pumpkins. Strawberry Alarm Clock keyboardist Weitz (who played keyboards in 2009 for Corgan's side project Spirits in the Sky) stated, "We’re picking up where we left off, but with a modern sound." The band also reworked some of its 1960s songs.

Founding member Lee Freeman (born November 8, 1949) died on February 14, 2010, at the age of 60, from complications arising from cancer.

Carrying on as Strawberry Alarm Clock were Weitz, Seol, Bunnell, Gunnels, and Anderson, with Bartek appearing as his schedule permitted. Strawberry Alarm Clock performed live during 2012 around Southern California, including appearances at The Satellite in Los Feliz, the Whisky a Go Go, the Echoplex (for the West Psych Fest), and the Adams Avenue Street Fair in San Diego.

On October 21, 2012, Strawberry Alarm Clock performed at the 29th annual Love Ride benefit in Glendale, which featured grand marshals Jay Leno, Peter Fonda, and Robert Patrick. Immediately following their Love Ride appearance, the band was awarded proclamations from the City of Los Angeles by City Councilman Tom LaBonge, Eric Garcetti, and Leno to commemorate the 45th anniversary of "Incense and Peppermints" reaching No. 1. The band accepted plaques for Freeman (posthumously) and King (who, by this time, was happily retired in Nashville, Tennessee). Bartek was present for their performance, as was the Neville Brothers' longtime harmonica player, Robert Cowan.

On April 1, 2012, Strawberry Alarm Clock released Wake Up Where You Are on the Global Recording Artists label. It was the band's fifth studio album and first since 1969.

Roger Ebert died on April 4, 2013, and on July 27, his widow, Chaz Ebert, requested that Strawberry Alarm Clock perform at the Saban Theatre in Beverly Hills as part of a tribute to her late husband. Strawberry Alarm Clock played a half-dozen songs, followed by a screening of Beyond the Valley of the Dolls. Charles Dierkop, a veteran character actor and longtime friend of the band, introduced them. In the months following the Saban Theatre engagement, Strawberry Alarm Clock made plans to write and record new material for an EP.

On August 19, 2016, Weitz was hospitalized after a car accident; veteran keyboardist Glenn Brigman filled in while Weitz recovered. On March 18, 2017, Strawberry Alarm Clock performed at the Starry Nights Festival in Santa Barbara with Weitz back on stage with the band once again.

Jimmy Pitman (born September 28, 1946) died in hospice care on August 29, 2019, at the age of 72.

== Band members ==
Current

- Gene Gunnels – drums, percussion, vocals (1967, 1969–1971, 1982–1983, 2006–present)
- Randy Seol – drums, vibes, percussion, vocals (1967–1968, 1974–1975, 1983–1984, 2001–present)
- Mark Weitz – keyboards, vocals (1967–1969, 1982–1983, 2006–present)
- George Bunnell – bass, rhythm guitars, vocals (1967–1968, 1974–1975, 1982–present)
- Steve Bartek – guitars, flute, producer (1967–1968, 1974–1975, 1983, 2003, 2006–present)
- Howie Anderson – lead guitar, vocals (1986–present)

Former

- Lee Freeman – rhythm guitars, harmonica, vocals (1967–1971, 1982–2008; died 2010)
- Ed King – lead guitars, bass, vocals (1967–1971, 2007; died 2018)
- Gary Lovetro – bass (1967)
- Greg Munford – vocals, drums (1967)
- Marty Katon – drums (1968-1969)
- Jimmy Pitman – guitars, vocals (1968–1969, died 2019)
- Paul Marshall – guitars, vocals (1969–1971, 2003, 2007)
- Leo Gaffney – vocals (1983)
- Doug Freeman – vocals (1983)
- Peter Wasner – keyboards (1983)
- James Harrah – guitars (1983–1984)
- Clay Benard – keyboards (1983–1984, 1986–1989)
- Bob Caloca – vocals (1983)
- Bruce Hubbard – drums, percussion (1984–2006)
- Jon Walmsley – guitars, keyboards, vocals (1984–1986)
- Glenn Brigman – keyboards (2016)

== Television and films ==
Strawberry Alarm Clock made several television appearances, including American Bandstand, Happening '68, The Steve Allen Show, and the first episode of Rowan & Martin's Laugh-In. Drummer Seol appeared as one of three eligible bachelors on The Dating Game and was chosen by the girl.

The band also made two notable appearances in films. In the 1968 Jack Nicholson movie Psych-Out, they performed several songs, including "Incense and Peppermints," "Rainy Day Mushroom Pillow," and "The World's on Fire." "The Pretty Song from Psych-Out" was re-recorded by a San Fernando Valley garage band, the Storybook, for the film's soundtrack album, but the Strawberry Alarm Clock's version was featured in the film.

The band's second movie appearance was in 1970's Beyond the Valley of the Dolls, where they played "Incense and Peppermints," "I'm Comin' Home," and "Girl from the City." The soundtrack release included the latter two songs, which were not on any previous albums and were recorded with Marshall on vocals.

== Discography ==
=== Studio albums ===
- Incense and Peppermints (1967, Uni Records)
- Wake Up...It's Tomorrow (1968, Uni Records)
- The World in a Sea Shell (1968, Uni Records)
- Good Morning Starshine (1969, Uni Records)
- Wake Up Where You Are (2012, Global Recording Artists)
- Where's One? (2026, Big Stir Records)

=== Compilation albums ===
- The Best of the Strawberry Alarm Clock (1969, Uni Records)
- Changes (1971, Vocalion Records)
- The Best of the Strawberry Alarm Clock Vol. 1 (1985, Back-Trac Records)
- Incense & Peppermints (1987, MCA Special Products)
- Strawberries Mean Love (1992, Big Beat Records)
- Anthology (At Their Best) (1993, One Way Records)
- Incense and Peppermints and Wake Up...It's Tomorrow (2013, Tune In)

=== Singles ===
Year	A-side/B-side Both sides from same album except where indicated	U.S. Charts		Canadian Charts		Album
Year	A-side/B-side Both sides from same album except where indicated	Billboard	Cashbox	RPM	CHUM	Album
1967	"Incense and Peppermints" b/w "The Birdman of Alkatrash" (Non-album track)	1	1	20	1 (2wks)	Incense and Peppermints
1968	"Tomorrow" b/w "Birds in My Tree" (from Incense and Peppermints)	23	14	20	16	Wake Up...It's Tomorrow
1968	"Sit with the Guru" b/w "Pretty Song from Psych-Out"	65	56	-	-	Wake Up...It's Tomorrow
1968	"Barefoot in Baltimore" b/w "An Angry Young Man"	67	54	45	-	The World in a Sea Shell
1968	"Sea Shell" b/w "Paxton's Back Street Carnival" (from Incense and Peppermints)	-	98	88	-	The World in a Sea Shell
1969	"Miss Attraction" b/w "(You Put Me On) Standby"	-	-	-	-	Good Morning Starshine
1969	"Good Morning Starshine" b/w "Me and the Township"	87	85	-	-	Good Morning Starshine
1969	"Desiree" b/w "Changes" (from Good Morning Starshine)	-	-	-	-	The Best of the Strawberry Alarm Clock
1969	"Starting Out the Day" b/w "Small Package" (from Good Morning Starshine)	-	-	-	-	The Best of the Strawberry Alarm Clock
1969	"I Climbed the Mountain" b/w "Three"	-	-	-	-	Non-album tracks
1970	"California Day" b/w "Three"	-	-	-	-	Non-album tracks
1970	"Girl from the City" b/w "Three"	-	-	-	-	Non-album tracks
