= Jean (song) =

Single by Oliver

from the album Good Morning Starshine
- B-side: "The Arrangement"
- Released: August 1969
- Recorded: 1969
- Genre: Pop
- Length: 3:22
- Label: Crewe Records
- Songwriter: Rod McKuen
- Producer: Bob Crewe

Oliver singles chronology
| "Good Morning Starshine" (1969) | "Jean" (1969) | "Sunday Mornin'" (1969) |

"Jean" is a popular song from the 1969 movie The Prime of Miss Jean Brodie. It was written by the American poet and composer Rod McKuen, who also recorded a version of the song.

== Background ==
The song was the theme to the 1969 film adaptation of Dame Muriel Spark's The Prime of Miss Jean Brodie, which starred noted British actress Maggie Smith. Smith won an Academy Award for Best Actress for her portrayal of the titular (and lead) character in the film, Jean Brodie. The song was performed by songwriter McKuen, who was nominated for an Academy Award in the category Best Original Song. Although released as a single in the summer of 1969, McKuen's version of the song failed to reach the American music charts.

== Oliver recording ==
"Jean" was also recorded by the American singer Oliver. Earlier in 1969, Oliver had reached #3 on the Billboard pop and easy listening charts with his version of "Good Morning Starshine," a song from the musical Hair. While working on an album with producer Bob Crewe (which would also be called Good Morning Starshine), "Jean" was selected as a song for the record and subsequently chosen as the follow-up single. It became another hit for the singer, reaching #2 on the US pop charts, where "Sugar, Sugar" by The Archies kept it from #1. In Canada, the song reached #1, both Pop and AC. "Jean" spent four weeks at #1 on the US adult contemporary chart. Oliver later said of his cover version of the song: "We had no idea it would be a single. It was a 3/4 ballad in the psychedelic era ... it was a beautiful arrangement."

== Charts ==
=== Weekly charts ===
| Chart (1969) | Peak position |
|---|---|
| Australia (Kent Music Report) | 5 |
| Canada RPM Adult Contemporary | 1 |
| Canada RPM Top Singles | 1 |
| New Zealand (Listener) | 2 |
| US Billboard Hot 100 | 2 |
| US Adult Contemporary (Billboard) | 1 |
| US Cash Box Top 100 | 2 |

=== Year-end charts ===
| Chart (1969) | Rank |
|---|---|
| Canada | 24 |
| US Billboard Hot 100 | 23 |
| US Cash Box Top 100 | 20 |

== Other recordings ==
- Sergio Franchi performed the song on the January 3, 1971, broadcast of The Ed Sullivan Show, subsequently released on a rare Franchi DVD.

== See also ==
- List of RPM number-one singles of 1969
- List of number-one adult contemporary singles of 1969 (U.S.)
