= Incense and Peppermints (album) =

Studio album by Strawberry Alarm Clock
- Released: October 1967
- Recorded: 1966–1967
- Studio: Original Sound Studio, Hollywood, Los Angeles, California
- Genre: Psychedelic rock; acid rock; psychedelic pop
- Length: 32:17
- Label: Uni/Sundazed
- Producer: Frank Slay, Bill Holmes

Strawberry Alarm Clock chronology
Incense and Peppermints (1967)	Wake Up...It's Tomorrow (1968)

Professional ratings
Review scores
Source	Rating
AllMusic	4/5 stars

Incense and Peppermints is the debut album by psychedelic rock band Strawberry Alarm Clock. Released in October 1967, it reached No. 11 on the Billboard 200 album charts during a 24-week run and included the band's No. 1 Billboard Hot 100 hit "Incense and Peppermints".

== Background ==
In addition to the band's six official members, the album features the flute playing of Steve Bartek, who co-wrote four of the album's songs with bass player George Bunnell.

The tracks "The World's on Fire", "Rainy Day Mushroom Pillow", and "Incense and Peppermints" were all featured in the motion picture Psych-Out, along with a new song, "Pretty Song from Psych-Out", which later appeared on the band's second album, Wake Up...It's Tomorrow.

A compilation album of the same name (albeit spelled with an ampersand) was released by MCA in 1990. The album has been released on CD in Japan and (more recently) on Sundazed Music.

== Reception ==
Andrew Sacher of BrooklynVegan said: "Compared to some of the bigger Summer of Love bands, SAC were a bit of a one trick pony on Incense and Peppermints, but their dedication to such overt psychedelia keeps them a favorite in niche circles today."

== Track listing ==
=== Side 1 ===
1. "The World's on Fire" (S.A. Clock) – 8:21
2. "Birds in My Tree" (George Bunnell, Steve Bartek) – 1:53
3. "Lose to Live" (Mark Weitz, S.A. Clock) – 3:13
4. "Strawberries Mean Love" (Bunnell, Bartek) – 3:01

=== Side 2 ===
1. "Rainy Day Mushroom Pillow" (Bunnell, Bartek) – 3:05
2. "Paxton's Back Street Carnival" (Bunnell, Bartek) – 2:01
3. "Hummin' Happy" (Bunnell, Randy Seol) – 2:25
4. "Pass Time with the SAC" [Instrumental] (S.A. Clock) – 1:21
5. "Incense and Peppermints" (John S. Carter, Tim Gilbert) (uncredited: Mark Weitz, Ed King) – 2:47
6. "Unwind with the Clock" (Lee Freeman, Ed King) – 4:10

=== Japanese CD bonus track ===
11. "The Birdman of Alkatrash" (Weitz)

== Personnel ==
- Mark Weitz – organ, piano, harpsichord, vocals
- Randy Seol – drums, bongos, vibraphone, vocals
- Ed King – lead guitar, vocals
- Lee Freeman – rhythm guitar, harmonica, vocals
- George Bunnell – bass, vocals
- Gary Lovetro – bass, vocals

with:

- Steve Bartek – flute (uncredited)
- Greg Munford – lead vocals on "Incense and Peppermints" (uncredited)
- Gene Gunnels – drums, cowbell on Incense and Peppermints (uncredited)

Technical

- Paul Buff – engineer
- Ed Caraeff – photography
