= Hunger (band) =

American garage/psychedelic rock band

Hunger! (or Hunger)
- Origin: Portland, Oregon, United States
- Genres: Psychedelic rock; garage rock
- Years active: 1967 - 1969
- Labels: Public!
- Past members: Mike Lane; Bill Daffern; Steve Hansen; Tom Tanory; John Morton; Mike Parkinson; Ed King; Gene Gunnels
- Website: www.facebook.com/groups/1634579373458316

Hunger! (the name sometimes given as just Hunger) was a band in the psychedelic rock music scene that flourished on the Sunset Strip in Los Angeles in the 1960s.

The band formed in Portland, Oregon, and later moved to Los Angeles, where they gained a following after opening for groups such as the Doors. They released one album, Strictly from Hunger!, in 1968 (reworked and reissued in 1969) and broke up soon after.

== Career ==
Hunger!, originally from Portland, Oregon and known as the Outcasts, toured regionally and had acquired a following. Their local success culminated with the group winning a local battle of the bands contest.

The band decided to try to make it in the Los Angeles music scene. Thy found a manager, changed their name to Hunger! and were soon playing in various Los Angeles venues including the Whisky a Go Go, the Cheetah, and Kaleidoscope, as well as lesser known venues such as the Blue Law, playing with and meeting other up and coming bands such as Hour Glass (which soon become the Allman Brothers Band), Steppenwolf, Procol Harum, all the while developing their sound and writing original material. As in Portland, Hunger! developed a following and were being favorably compared to bands such as the Doors in the Los Angeles music press.

They recorded their album Strictly From Hunger!, which was released in Europe in 1968 and gained radio play and sales. But the band, which had already been on the verge of breaking up, dissolved under the added pressures. A reworked version of the album, featuring Strawberry Alarm Clock and Lynyrd Skynyrd guitarist Ed King, was released in 1969.

Today Hunger! and the album Strictly From Hunger maintain a cult status in psychedelic circles having been covered by bands such as the Treblemakers and the Glass Keys.

Hunger! singer Bill Daffern later sang with Captain Beyond (as Willy Daffern), featuring on their third album Dawn Explosion.

== Discography ==
Albums

- Strictly From Hunger (Public! Records P-1006) 1969
- Hunger (No label) 1969

Both albums were reissued as The Lost Album, a 2-LP package (Akarma 045/2) in 1999

Singles

- She Let Him Continue/Mind Machine (Public! Records PR 101/2) 1968
- No Shame/Not So Fine (Public! Records PR 103/4) 1968
- Colors/Mind Machine (Public! Records PR 1001) 1969
