= Sitar =

Indian plucked stringed instrument

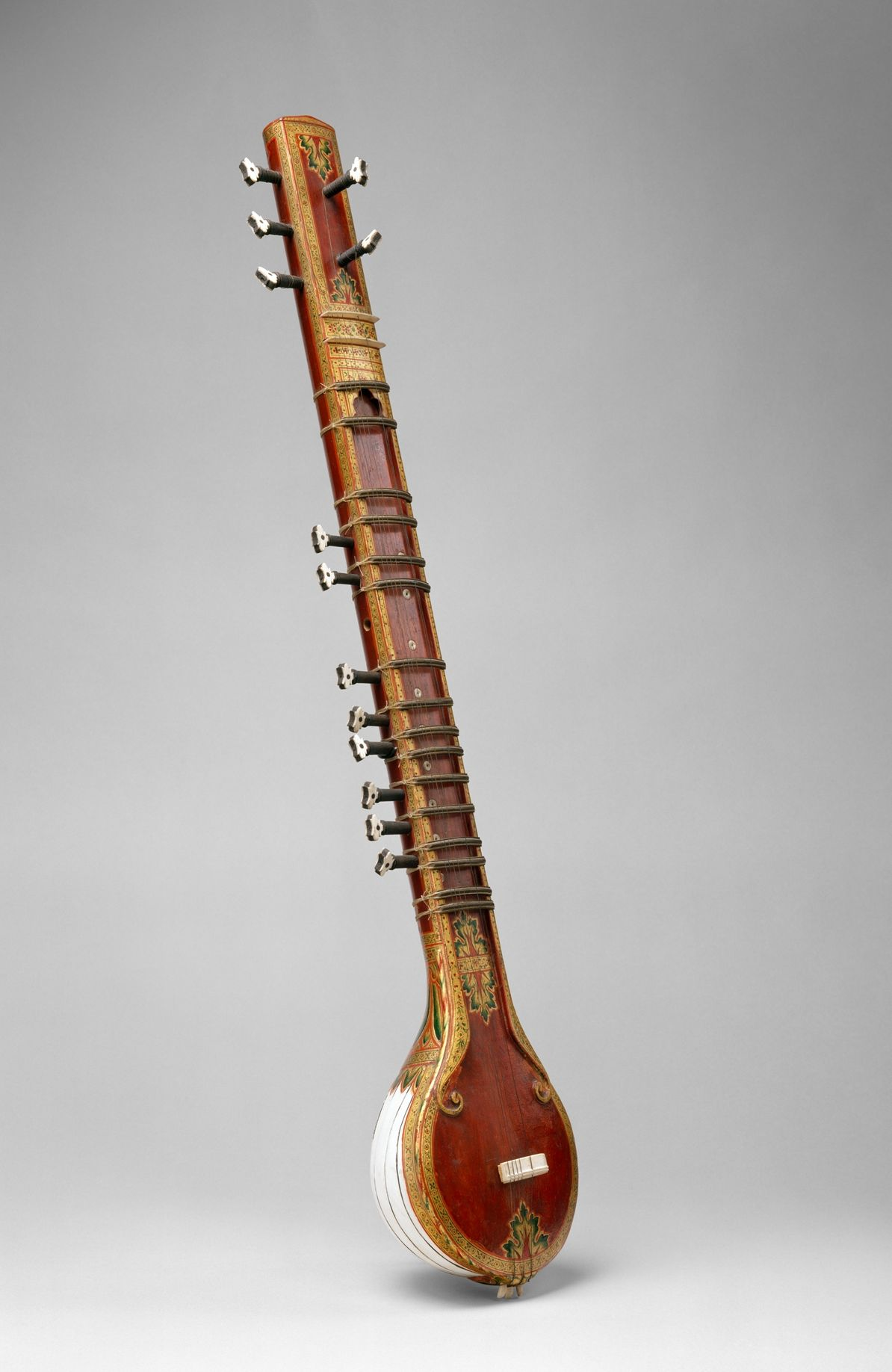

String instrument
- Classification: Necked bowl lutes; String instruments
- Hornbostel–Sachs classification: 321.321 (Composite chordophone sounded with a plectrum)
- Developed: 18th century

Related instruments
- List: Setar; Pandura; Surbahar; Rudra veena; Saraswati veena; Chitra veena; Vichitra veena; Sarod; Sursingar; Tambouras; Tanpura; Sitarla

Sound sample

The sitar (English: /ˈsɪtɑːr/ or /sɪˈtɑːr/; IAST: sitāra) is a plucked stringed instrument originating from the Indian subcontinent and used in Hindustani classical music. The instrument was invented in the 18th century, and arrived at its present form in 19th-century India. Khusrau Khan, an 18th-century figure of the Mughal Empire, has been identified by modern scholarship as the inventor of the sitar. According to most historians, he developed the sitar from the setar, an Iranian instrument of Abbasid or Safavid origin.

Used widely throughout the Indian subcontinent, the sitar became popularly known in the wider world through the works of Ravi Shankar, beginning in the late 1950s and early 1960s. The advent of psychedelic culture during the mid-to-late 1960s set a trend for the use of the sitar in Western popular music, with the instrument appearing on tracks by bands such as The Beatles, The Rolling Stones, Metallica and many others.

== Etymology ==
The word sitar is derived from the Persian word sehtar, meaning 'three-stringed'.

According to Curt Sachs, Persians chose to name their lutes around the word tar, meaning string, combined with a word for the number of strings.

By example:

- Du + tar is the 2-stringed dutār,
- se + tar is the 3-stringed setār,
- čar + tar is for a tar with 4 strings,
- panč + tār is for a tar with 5 strings.

== History ==
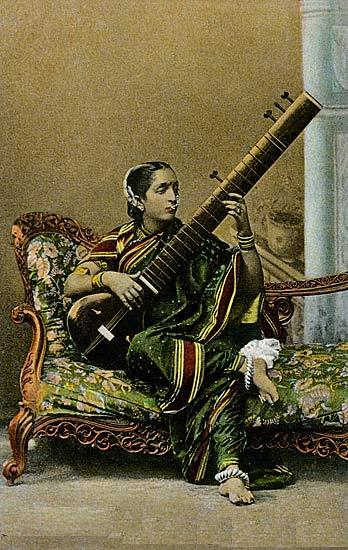
19th-century sitar with 4 strings

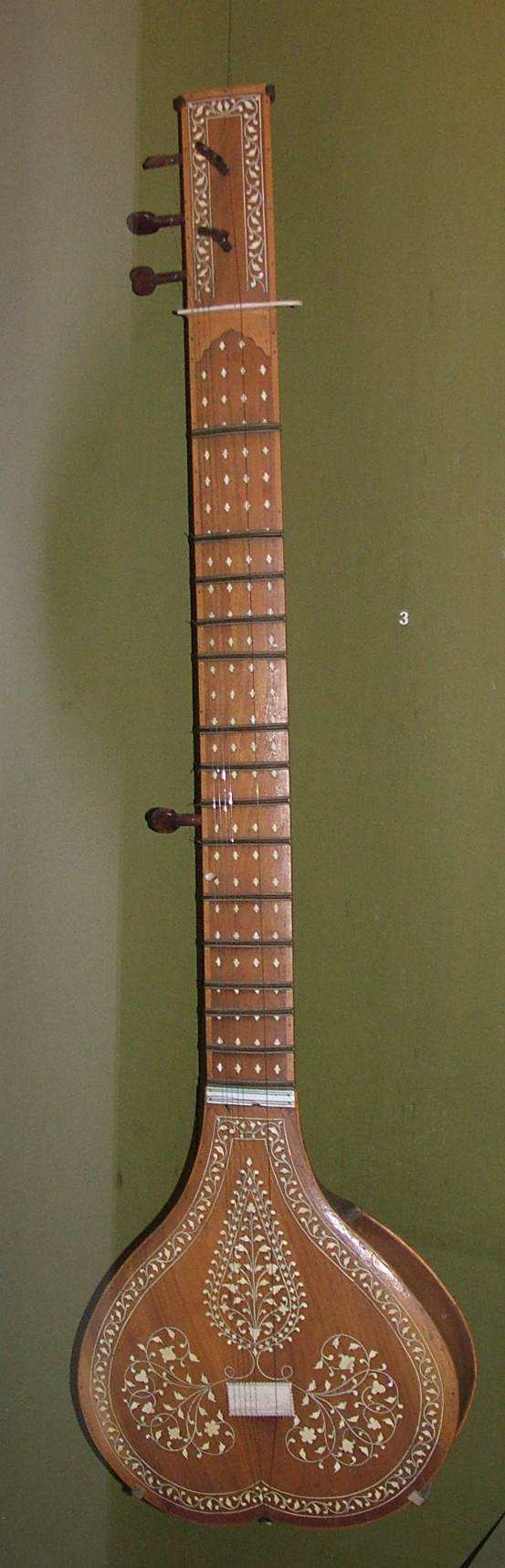
19th-century sitar. This instrument does not have sympathetic strings.

It was theorized that the sitar was invented, or rather developed by Amir Khusrow (c. 1253–1325), a famous Sufi inventor, poet and pioneer of Khyal, Tarana and Qawwali, during the 13th century. However, the tradition of Amir Khusrow is considered discredited by scholars. Whatever instruments he might have played, no record exists from this period using the name "sitar". An ambiguous statement made in a 19th-century work by Captain N. Augustus Willard may have resulted in the incorrect association of the renowned poet Amir Khusrau with a later individual, potentially named Khusrau Khan, who lived during the 18th century.

The earliest mention of Sitar dates back to 1739 AD. The "Muraqqa-i-Dehli", written by Dargah Quli Khan during the reign of Muhammad Shah Rangila, gives the earliest reference to the sitar. Oral and textual evidence analysed by historians indicate that an eighteenth-century figure of the Mughal court, named Khusrau Khan originated the sitar from the small Persian three-stringed setar. In the late Mughal Empire, the instrument began to take on its modern shape. The neck got wider. The bowl, which had been made of glued lathes of wood was now made of gourd, with metal frets and a bone nut on the neck. Masid Khan added two more strings to the sitar. The modern seven string sitar was created by Allauddin Khan. Sympathetic strings on sitar were first added by Imdad Khan. The earliest compositional style specifically for the sitar emerged in the mid-eighteenth century, attributed to Firoz Khan, who was either the son or nephew of Khusrau Khan.

Another, discredited hypothesis is that the sitar is derived from locally developed Indian instruments, such as the veena, prior to the arrival of Islam. Proponents of this hypothesis claim that Indian temple sculptures from the 9th and 10th centuries feature sitar-like instruments. However, according to author Samidha Vedabala, a researcher and professor of music at Sikkim University, none of the instruments depicted in these sculptures precisely resemble the sitar, and neither the word "sitar" nor any local equivalent appears in any texts referring to these instruments. So its authenticity is in the absolute dark. According to Allyn Miner, the evidence for this hypothesis is too weak for any conclusion and these hypotheses represent a prominent yet obsolete late 19th-century idea: that many of India's modern cultural innovations are actually products of pre-Muslim Sanskritic traditions. According to Alastair Dick, the "modern view that ... invading Muslims simply changed into Persian the name of an existing Hindu instrument ... has no historical or musical foundation". Other scholars have contested the veena origin hypotheses of the sitar by pointing out that proponents of these hypotheses select the number of strings as the primary criterion in coming to their conclusions. Additionally, they attempt to trace the sitar back to a known Indian musical instrument with a Sanskrit name, while acknowledging that there is no evidence for the existence of long-necked lutes in the Indian subcontinent prior to the era of Muslim expansion into the region.

== Physical description ==
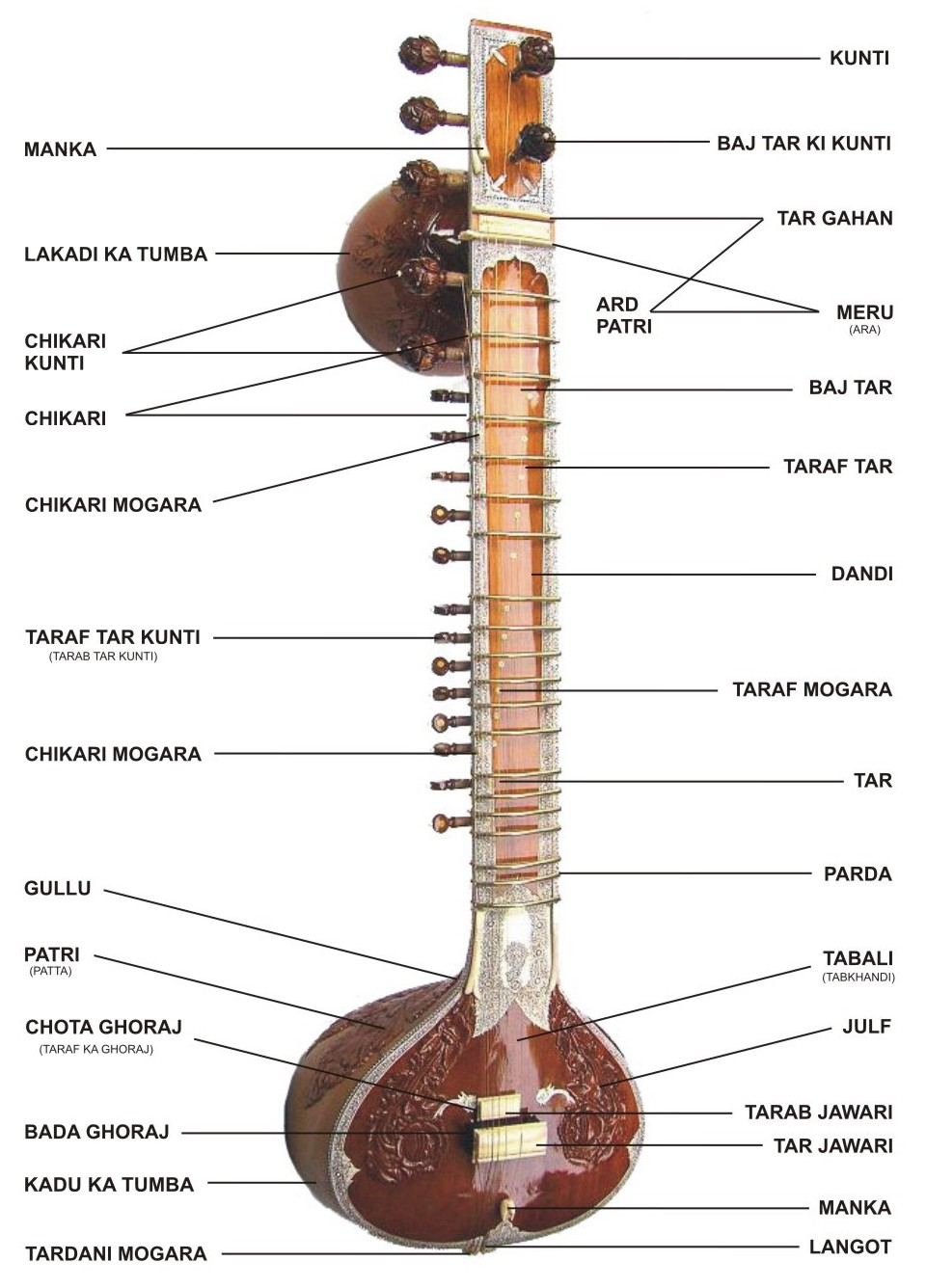
Anatomy of a sitar

A sitar can have 18, 19, 20, or 21 strings; 6 or 7 of these run over curved, raised frets and are played strings; the remainder are sympathetic strings (tarb, also known as taarif or tarafdaar), running underneath the frets and resonating in sympathy with the played strings. The frets, which are known as pardā or thaat, are movable, allowing fine tuning. The played strings run to tuning pegs on or near the head of the instrument, while the sympathetic strings, which have a variety of different lengths, pass through small holes in the fretboard to engage with the smaller tuning pegs that run down the instrument's neck.

The instrument has two bridges: the large bridge (badaa goraa) for the playing and drone strings and the small bridge (chota goraa) for the sympathetic strings. Its timbre results from the way the strings interact with the wide, rounded bridge. As a string vibrates, its length changes slightly as one edge moves along the rounded bridge, promoting the creation of overtones and giving the sound its distinctive tone. The maintenance of this specific tone by shaping the bridge is called jawari. Many musicians rely on instrument makers to adjust this.

Materials used in construction include teak wood or tun wood (Cedrela toona), which is a variation of mahogany, for the neck and faceplate (tabli), and calabash gourds for the resonating chambers. The instrument's bridges are made of deer horn, ebony, or very occasionally from camel bone. Synthetic material is now common as well.

== Construction styles ==
There are two popular modern styles of sitar: the fully decorated "instrumental style" (sometimes called the "Ravi Shankar style") and the "gayaki" style (sometimes called the "Vilayat Khan" style).

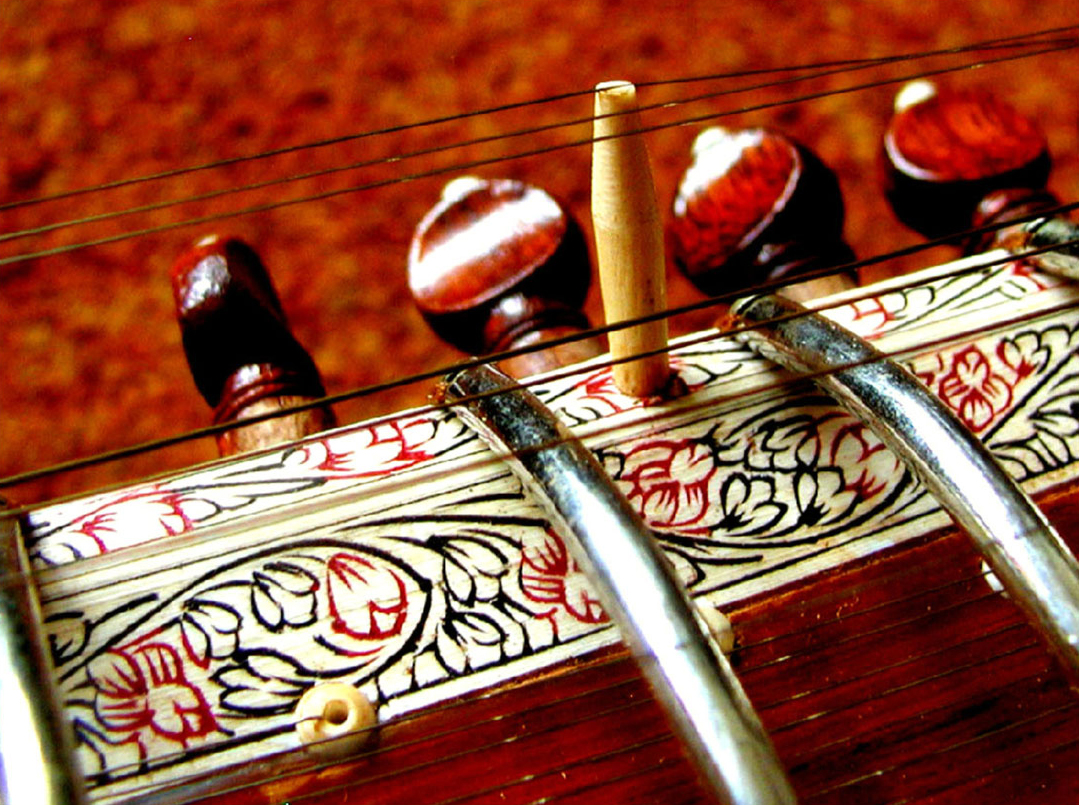
Close-up of the pen work on a "Ravi Shankar style" sitar

The instrumental style sitar is most often made of seasoned toon wood, but sometimes made of teak. It is often fitted with a second resonator, a small tumba (pumpkin or pumpkin-like wood replica) on the neck. This style is usually fully decorated, with floral or grape carvings and celluloid inlays with colored (often brown or red) and black floral or arabesque patterns. It typically has 13 sympathetic strings. It is said that the best Teak sitars are made from teak that has been seasoned for generations. The sources of very old seasoned wood are guarded trade secrets. Therefore, instrument builders look for old teak that was used in old colonial-style villas as whole trunk columns for their special sitar constructions.

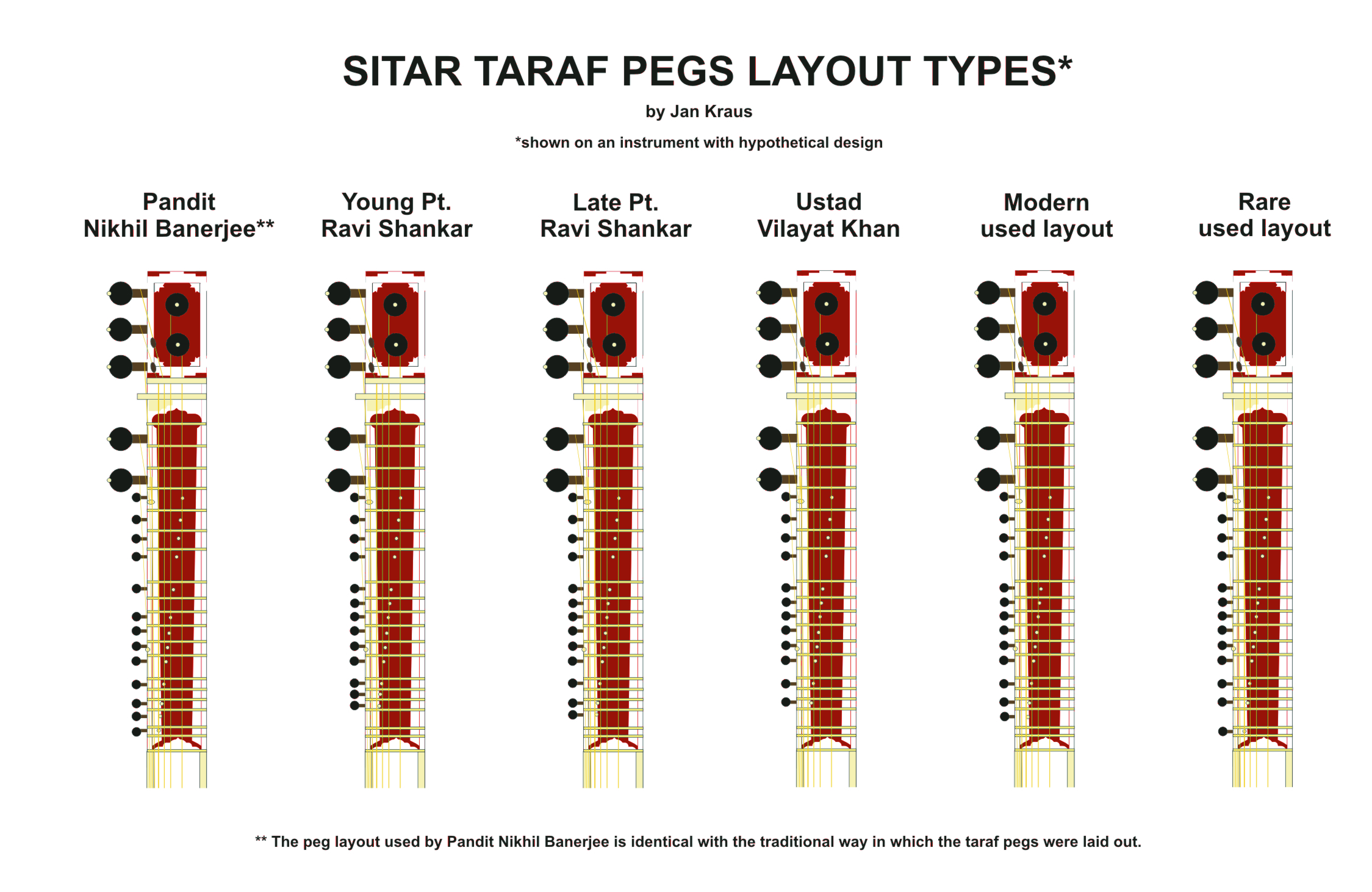
Preferences of taraf string and peg positioning and their total number

There are various additional sub-styles and cross mixes of styles in sitars, according to customer preferences. Most importantly, there are some differences in preferences for the positioning of sympathetic (taraf) string pegs (see photo).

Among all sitar styles, there are student styles, beginner models, semi-pro styles, pro models, master models, and so on. Prices are often determined by the manufacturer's name and not by looks alone or materials used. Some sitars by certain manufacturers fetch very high collectible prices. Most notable are older Rikhi Ram (Delhi) and older Hiren Roy (Kolkata) sitars, depending upon which master built the instrument. Nikhil Banerjee had a small extra bridge fixed at the top of the sitar fingerboard for sustain.

== Tuning of sitar ==
Tuning depends on the sitarist's school or style, tradition and each artist's personal preference. The main playing string is almost invariably tuned a perfect fourth above the tonic, the second string being tuned to the tonic. The tonic in the Indian solfège system is referred to as ṣaḍja, ṣaḍaj, or the shortened form sa, or khaṛaj, a dialectal variant of ṣaḍaj, not as vād, and the perfect fifth to which one or more of the drones strings are tuned is referred to as pañcam, not samvād.

The player should re-tune for each raga. Strings are tuned by tuning pegs, and the main playing strings can be fine-tuned by sliding a bead threaded on each string just below the bridge.

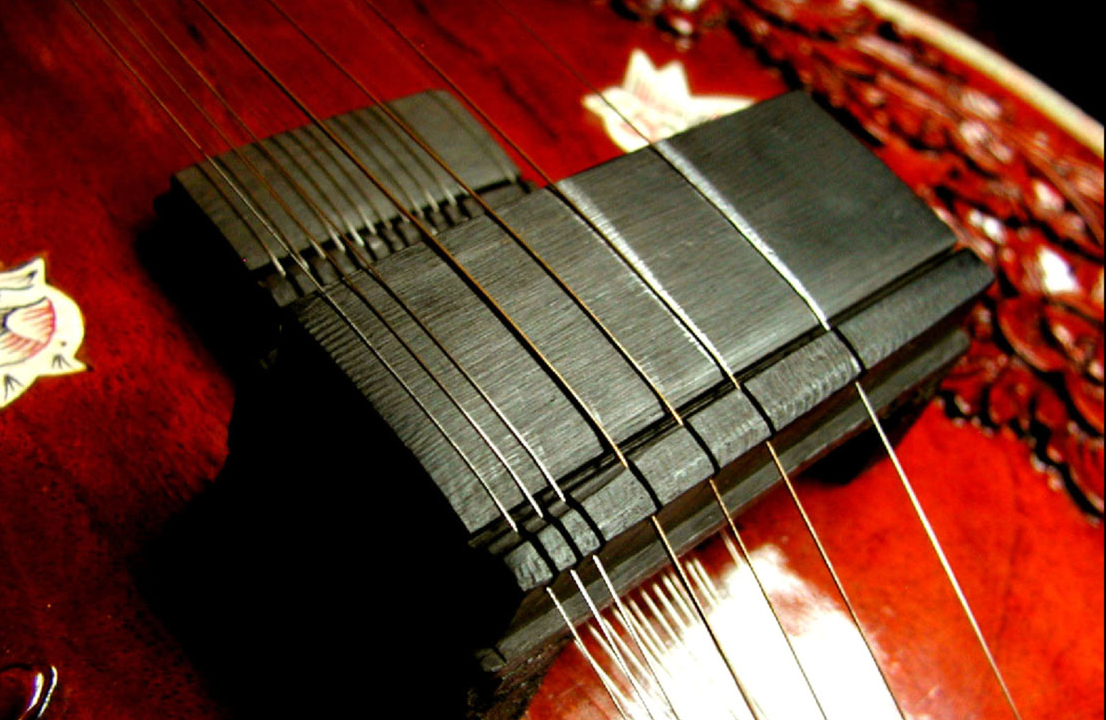
A black ebony wood Jawari

In one or more of the more common tunings (used by Ravi Shankar, among others, called "Kharaj Pancham" sitar) the playable strings are strung in this fashion:

- Chikari strings: Sa (high), Sa (middle), and Pa.
- Kharaj (bass) strings: Sa (low) and Pa (low).
- Jod and baaj strings, Sa and Ma.

There is a lot of stylistic variance within these tunings, and like most Indian stringed instruments, there is no default tuning. Mostly, tunings vary by schools of teaching (gharana) and the piece that is meant to be played.

== Playing ==
The instrument is balanced between the player's left foot and right knee. The hands move freely without having to carry any of the instrument's weight. The player plucks the string using a metallic pick or plectrum called a mizraab. The thumb stays anchored on the top of the fretboard just above the main gourd. Generally, only the index and middle fingers are used for fingering although a few players occasionally use the third. A specialized technique called "meend" involves pulling the main melody string down over the bottom portion of the sitar's curved frets, with which the sitarist can achieve a seven-semitone range of notes. This was developed by Vilayat Khan into a technique that imitated the melisma of the vocal style, a technique known as gayaki ang. Sometimes, a sitar could be played with a bow. Its sound is similar to sarangi, but raspier.

Adept players bring in charisma through the use of special techniques like Kan, Krintan, Murki, Zamzama, etc. They also use special Mizrab Bol-s, as in Misrabani.

== World music influence ==
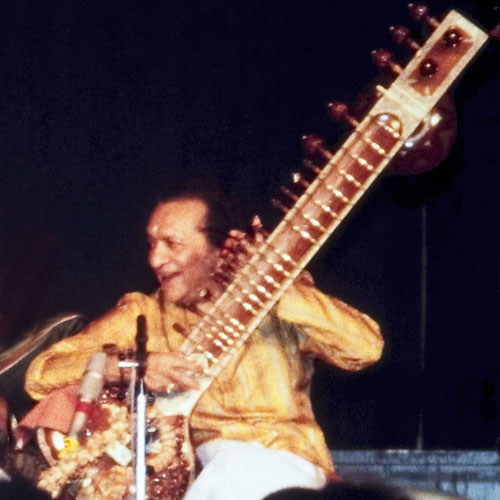
Ravi Shankar in 1988

In the late 1950s and early 1960s Ravi Shankar, along with his tabla player, Alla Rakha, began a further introduction of Indian classical music to western culture.

The sitar saw use in western music when, guided by David Crosby's championing of Shankar, George Harrison played it on the Beatles' songs "Norwegian Wood (This Bird Has Flown)", "Love You To" and "Within You Without You", recorded between 1965 and 1967. The Beatles' association with the instrument helped popularise Indian classical music among Western youth, particularly once Harrison began receiving tutelage from Shankar and the latter's protégé Shambhu Das in 1966. That same year, Brian Jones of the Rolling Stones used a sitar on "Paint It Black", while another English guitarist, Dave Mason, played it on Traffic's 1967 hits "Paper Sun" and "Hole in My Shoe". These and other examples marked a trend of featuring the instrument in pop songs, which Shankar later described as "the great sitar explosion". Speaking to KRLA Beat in July 1967, he said: "Many people, especially young people, have started listening to sitar since George Harrison, one of the Beatles, became my disciple ... It is now the 'in' thing."

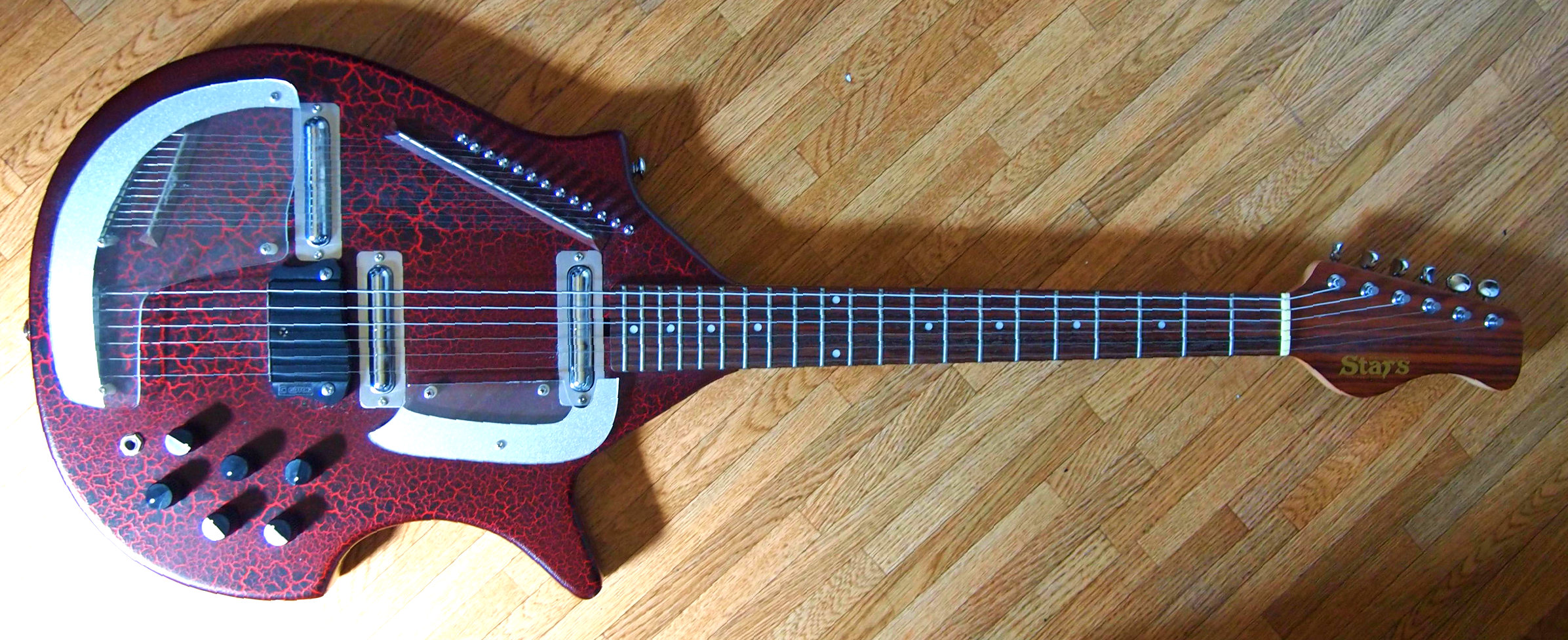
Star's electric sitar guitar

Led Zeppelin's Jimmy Page talked about his love of Indian music, saying: "I went to India after I came back from a tour with the Yardbirds in the late sixties just so I could hear the music firsthand. Let's put it this way: I had a sitar before George Harrison got his. I wouldn't say I played it as well as he did, though..." Robbie Krieger's guitar part on the Doors' 1967 track "The End" was heavily influenced by Indian ragas and features melodic and rhythmic qualities that suggest a sitar or veena. Many pop performances actually involve the electric sitar, which is a solid-body, guitar-like instrument and quite different from the traditional acoustic Indian instrument.

The Kinks' 1965 single "See My Friends" featured a "low-tuned drone guitar" that was widely mistaken to be a sitar. Crosby's band, the Byrds, had similarly incorporated elements of Indian music, using "only Western instrumentation", on their songs "Eight Miles High" and "Why" in 1966. Psychedelic music bands often used new recording techniques and effects and drew on non-Western sources such as the ragas and drones of Indian music. The Electric Prunes appeared in early ads for the Vox Wah wah pedal, which touted the effect's ability to make an electric guitar sound like a sitar.

Donovan's personnel on his 1966 album Sunshine Superman included Shawn Phillips on sitar. Phillips also played sitar on one song on Donovan's next album Mellow Yellow, produced in 1967.

Starting in the late 1970s, Pakistan International Airlines in-flight music featured the sitar to evoke feelings of nostalgia for the homeland among the Pakistani diaspora.

Steve Howe of the British progressive rock band Yes played a Danelectro sitar guitar on their album Close to the Edge as well as the song "To Be Over" from their 1974 album "Relayer". Deepak Khazanchi played sitar and tanpura on the song "It Can Happen", from Yes' 1983 album 90125.

Paul Young's 1985 cover of Hall & Oates's song "Everytime You Go Away" included an electric sitar played by John Turnbull.

== Sitar gharanas ==
A gharana is a system of social organisation in the Indian subcontinent, linking musicians or dancers by lineage or apprenticeship. Notable gharana include:

- Imdadkhani gharana
- Maihar gharana
- Bishnupur gharana

== See also ==
- Category:Sitar players
- Sitar in popular music
