= Sit with the Guru =

"Sit With The Guru"

Single by Strawberry Alarm Clock

from the album Wake Up...It's Tomorrow
- B-side: "Pretty Song from Psych-Out"
- Released: 1968
- Genre: Psychedelic pop
- Length: 2:59
- Label: UNI Records; UNI 55018
- Songwriter(s): Ed King, Mark Weitz, Roy Freeman
- Producer(s): Frank Slay, Bill Holmes

Strawberry Alarm Clock singles chronology
"Tomorrow" (1967)	"Sit With The Guru" (1968)	"Barefoot in Baltimore" (1968)

"Sit with the Guru" was a song recorded and released by Strawberry Alarm Clock in 1968. It was included on the band's second album, Wake Up...It's Tomorrow. "Sit with the Guru" went to No. 65 on the US, Hot 100.

The band re-recorded a much longer version of this song for their 2012 studio album Wake Up Where You Are, including more significant sitar.

== Chart performance ==
Chart (1968)	Peak position
US Billboard Hot 100	65
