= Oliver (singer) =

American pop singer (1945–2000)

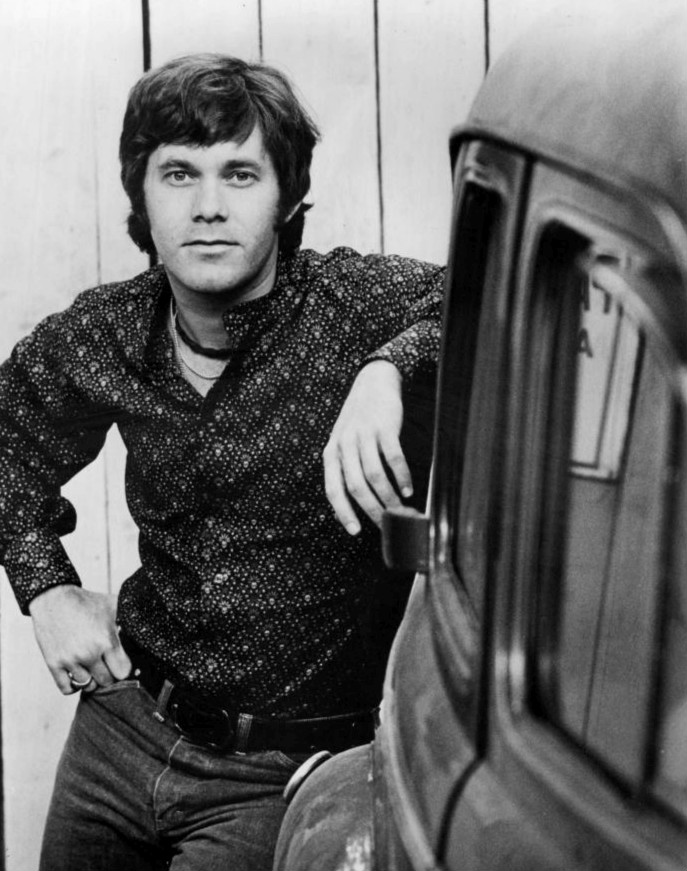
- Oliver in a 1972 publicity photo
- Born: William Oliver Swofford; February 22, 1945; North Wilkesboro, North Carolina, U.S.
- Died: February 12, 2000 (aged 54); Shreveport, Louisiana, U.S.
- Resting place: Laurel Land Memorial Park, Dallas, Texas, U.S.
- Education: University of North Carolina at Chapel Hill
- Occupation: Singer
- Spouses: Margaret Hicks Ramspacher (m. 1974–1988) Rebecca Jean Alexander (m. 1991)
- Relatives: John Swofford
- Musical career
- Genres: Pop
- Instrument: Vocals
- Years active: 1969–1984

William Oliver Swofford (February 22, 1945 – February 12, 2000), known professionally as Oliver, was an American pop singer, best known for his 1969 song "Good Morning Starshine" from the musical Hair as well as "Jean" (the theme from the film The Prime of Miss Jean Brodie).

== Career ==
William Oliver Swofford was born on February 22, 1945, in North Wilkesboro, North Carolina, to Jack and Helen Swofford. He attended the University of North Carolina at Chapel Hill starting in 1963 and began singing as an undergraduate. He was a member of two popular music groups — The Virginians and, later, The Good Earth — and was then known as Bill Swofford.

His uptempo single "Good Morning Starshine" from the pop/rock musical Hair reached No. 3 on the Billboard Hot 100 in July 1969, sold over one million copies, and was awarded a gold disc by the R.I.A.A. a month later. Later that fall, a softer, ballad single titled "Jean" (the theme from the Oscar-winning film The Prime of Miss Jean Brodie) reached No. 2 on the Hot 100 and No. 1 on the Billboard Easy Listening chart. Written by poet Rod McKuen, "Jean" also sold over one million copies, garnering Oliver his second gold disc in as many months. Performing both hits on a number of television variety shows and specials in the late 1960s, including The Ed Sullivan Show, helped both songs.

Oliver had more modest commercial success with the cover of "Sunday Mornin'", which peaked at No. 35 in December 1969, and "Angelica", which stalled at No. 97 four months later. His cover of "I Can Remember", the 1968 James & Bobby Purify hit, missed the Hot 100 but climbed into the top 25 of the Billboard Easy Listening chart in the mid summer of 1970. Late that fall, Oliver also had one inspirational recording titled "Light the Way", composed by Eric Carmen. Oliver's last single to enter the pop music charts was his 1971 cover of "Early Morning Rain" by Canadian singer-songwriter Gordon Lightfoot. The song "Bubbled Under" at No. 124 on May 1, 1971 and also reached No. 38 on the Easy Listening chart a few weeks later.

As producer Bob Crewe preferred elaborately orchestrated musical arrangements and Oliver preferred a simpler folk sound, these "creative differences" led them to part ways in 1971. Resuming the name Bill "Oliver" Swofford, the singer toured hundreds of college campuses in the eastern and southern United States in 1976 and 1977. He was recorded on numerous albums of his friends, including Steve Goodman, and is credited with guitar and vocals on several of Steve's albums. He and Goodman wrote one of the songs together (Jessie's Jig (Rob's Romp, Beth's Bounce)) which was released on the album Jessie's Jig and Other Favorites and dedicated it to their children.

In 1984, Oliver recorded his final album, In Our Time. The album was finally released in 2005 under the title Lonely Days and contained the same song list as "In Our Time" minus his re-recorded hits "Good Morning Starshine" and "Jean".

== Personal life and death ==
For a number of years in the mid-1990s, Oliver was treated for Sjögren syndrome, before being diagnosed with non-Hodgkin lymphoma. By the time that disease was confirmed, it had spread throughout his body, giving little hope of a full remission. In 1999, his brother John donated bone marrow for a transplant to try to save Bill's life. However, he died ten months later on February 12, 2000, at LSU Hospital in Shreveport. Swofford is buried at Laurel Land Memorial Park in Dallas, Texas.

In 2009, Ted Brown, a native of Swofford's home town, asked North Carolina legislators to introduce a resolution in the North Carolina General Assembly to honor Swofford and his contributions to music. On July 7, 2009, the resolution was passed. On the 40th anniversary of Swofford's hit-making success, Brown chaired and directed a musical tribute, "OliverFest", in honor of Swofford. Bob Crewe, and "60's on 6" celebrity disc jockey, Phlash Phelps, served as honorary co-chair(s) with Brown.

Oliver was inducted into the North Carolina Music Hall of Fame in 2010. In 2012, he was inducted into the Blue Ridge Music Hall of Fame. Four years later, he was inducted into the Wilkes County (North Carolina) Hall of Fame.

== Discography ==
=== Albums ===
Year	Album	Billboard 200	Record Label
1969	Good Morning Starshine	19	Crewe Records
1970	Again	71	Crewe Records
1971	The Best of Oliver	—	Crewe Records
1971	Prisms	—	United Artists Records
1984	In Our Time	—	Self-released
1997	Oliver	—	United Artists Records
2005	Good Morning Starshine:The Best of Oliver	—	Taragon Records
"—" denotes releases that did not chart.

=== Singles ===
Year	Title	Peak chart positions					Record Label	B-side	Album
Year	Title	US	US A/C	CAN	AUS	UK	Record Label	B-side	Album
1969	"Good Morning Starshine"	3	3	1	8	6	Jubilee Records	"Can't You See"	Good Morning Starshine
1969	"Jean"	2	1	1	5	—	Crewe Records	"The Arrangement"	Good Morning Starshine
1969	"Sunday Mornin'"	35	14	20	—	—	Crewe Records	"Letmekissyouwithadream"	Non-album single
1970	"Angelica"	97	26	69	54	—	Crewe Records	"Anna"	Again
1970	"I Can Remember"	—	24	61	—	—	Crewe Records	"Where There's a Heartache (There Must Be a Heart)"	Again
1970	"Come Softly to Me" (duet with Lesley Gore, billed as "Billy n' Sue")	—	—	—	—	—	Crewe Records	"Billy n' Sue's Love Theme"	Non-album single
1970	"Light the Way"	—	—	—	—	—	United Artists Records	"Sweet Kindness"	Prisms
1971	"Early Morning Rain"	124	38	—	—	—	United Artists Records	"Catch Me If You Can"	Prisms
1973	"Everybody I Love You"	—	—	—	—	—	Paramount Records	"I Am Reaching"	Non-album singles
1981	"Child of Peace"	—	—	—	—	—	People Song Records	"The 184th Crossing"	Non-album singles
"—" denotes releases that did not chart or were not released in that territory.

== Bibliography ==
- Hyatt, Wesley (1999). The Billboard Book of #1 Adult Contemporary Hits (Billboard Publications)
