= Rod McKuen =

American poet, singer-songwriter, and composer (1933–2015)

- McKuen in 1970

Background information
- Born: Rodney Marvin Woolever; April 29, 1933; Oakland, California, U.S.
- Died: January 29, 2015 (aged 81) Beverly Hills, California, U.S.
- Occupations: Singer-songwriter; poet; composer
- Instruments: Vocals; piano
- Years active: 1955–2004
- Partner: Edward Habib

Rodney Marvin McKuen (/məˈkjuːən/ mə-KEW-ən; né Woolever; April 29, 1933 – January 29, 2015) was an American poet, singer-songwriter and composer. He was one of the best-selling poets in the United States during the late 1960s. Throughout his career, McKuen produced a wide range of recordings, which included popular music, spoken word poetry, film soundtracks and classical music. He earned two Academy Award nominations for his music compositions. McKuen's translations and adaptations of the songs of Jacques Brel were instrumental in bringing the Belgian songwriter to prominence in the English-speaking world. His poetry deals with themes of love, the natural world and spirituality. McKuen's songs sold over 100 million recordings worldwide and 60 million books of his poetry were sold as well.

== Early years ==
McKuen was born as Rodney Marvin Woolever on April 29, 1933, in a Salvation Army hostel in Oakland, California to Clarice Woolever. According to critic Betty Jean Lifton in The New York Times, McKuen had "two birth certificates, each giving conflicting dates and spelling his father's name different ways." He never knew his biological father, who had left his mother. Sexually and physically abused by relatives, raised by his mother and stepfather, who was a violent alcoholic, McKuen ran away from home. He drifted along the West Coast, supporting himself as a ranch hand, surveyor, railroad worker, lumberjack, rodeo cowboy, stuntman and radio disc jockey, always sending money home to his mother.

At some point, he began using the name "McKuen" as the best approximation of what he thought his father's name was. His mother told him that his father's name was "Mac" McKuen (although she was unsure how it was spelled). At one point later in life, McKuen hired a detective agency to try to locate his father. Again per Lifton in The New York Times, "Whether or not he found his father, at least he (and the detectives) found a man 10 years deceased who satisfies him -- Rodney Marion McKune, a lumberman in Utah, twice married (the last time to a woman 20 years his senior), who at the close of his life was an iceman in Santa Monica, Calif., 20 miles from where McKuen was living. No relative of this McKune remembers him taking a trip from Utah to Oakland that summer of 1932 when the author was conceived, but a Mormon churchman remembers taking a trip there with him in 1931 or 1932."

To compensate for his lack of formal education, McKuen began keeping a journal, which resulted in his first poetry and song lyrics. After dropping out of Oakland Technical High School prior to graduating in 1951, McKuen worked as a newspaper columnist and propaganda script writer during the Korean War. He settled in San Francisco, where he read his poetry in clubs alongside Beat poets like Jack Kerouac and Allen Ginsberg. He began performing as a folk singer at the folk club Purple Onion. Over time, he began incorporating his own songs into his act. McKuen was signed to Decca Records and released several pop albums in the late 1950s. McKuen also appeared as an actor in Rock, Pretty Baby (1956), Summer Love (1958) and the western Wild Heritage (1958). He also sang with Lionel Hampton's band. In 1959, McKuen moved to New York City to compose and conduct music for the TV show The CBS Workshop. McKuen appeared on To Tell The Truth on June 18, 1962, as a decoy contestant and described himself as "a published poet and a twist singer."

== Discovering Jacques Brel ==
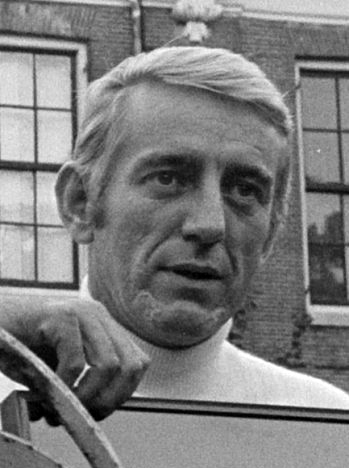
McKuen in 1972

In the early 1960s, McKuen moved to France, where he first met the Belgian singer-songwriter and chanson singer Jacques Brel. McKuen began to translate the work of this composer into English, which led to the song "If You Go Away" – an international pop-standard – based on Brel's "Ne me quitte pas". McKuen translated Brel's song "Le Moribond" loosely into "Seasons in the Sun", and British folkbeat group The Fortunes charted with the song in the Netherlands in 1969. In 1974, singer Terry Jacks turned McKuen's "Seasons in the Sun" into a best-selling pop hit, and also charted with a cover of "If You Go Away." McKuen also translated songs by other French songwriters, including Georges Moustaki, Gilbert Bécaud, Pierre Delanoé, and Michel Sardou.

In 1978, after hearing of Brel's death, McKuen was quoted as saying, "As friends and as musical collaborators we had traveled, toured and written – together and apart – the events of our lives as if they were songs, and I guess they were. When news of Jacques' death came I stayed locked in my bedroom and drank for a week. That kind of self-pity was something he wouldn't have approved of, but all I could do was replay our songs (our children) and ruminate over our unfinished life together."

== Poetry ==
In the mid-1960s, McKuen began to publish books of poetry, earning a substantial following among young people with collections like Stanyan Street & Other Sorrows (1966), Listen to the Warm (1967), and Lonesome Cities (1968). His Lonesome Cities album of readings won a Grammy for Best Spoken Word Recording in 1968. McKuen's poems were translated into eleven languages and his books sold over 1 million copies in 1968 alone. McKuen said that his most romantic poetry was influenced by American poet Walter Benton's two books of poems. McKuen sold over 60 million books worldwide, according to the Associated Press.

== Songwriting ==
McKuen wrote over 1,500 songs and released up to 200 albums which have accounted for the sale of over 100 million records worldwide according to the Associated Press. His songs have been performed by such diverse artists as Robert Goulet, Glenn Yarbrough, Barbra Streisand, Perry Como, Petula Clark, Waylon Jennings, The Boston Pops, Chet Baker, Jimmie Rodgers, Johnny Cash, Pete Fountain, Andy Williams, The Kingston Trio, Percy Faith, the London Philharmonic, Nana Mouskouri, Daliah Lavi, Julio Iglesias, Dusty Springfield, Johnny Mathis, Al Hirt, Greta Keller, Aaron Freeman, and Frank Sinatra.

In 1959, McKuen released his first novelty single with Bob McFadden under the pseudonym Dor on the Brunswick label, called "The Mummy". The McKuen-written song reached No. 39 on the Billboard pop chart. In 1961, he had a hit single titled "Oliver Twist". He co-wrote it along with Gladys Shelley and the Spiral label-issued single reached No. 76 on the Billboard pop chart. His hoarse and throaty singing voice on these and other recordings was a result of McKuen straining his vocal cords in 1961 due to too many promotional appearances.

McKuen collaborated with numerous composers, including Henry Mancini, John Williams, Anita Kerr, and Arthur Greenslade. His symphonies, concertos, and other orchestral works have been performed by orchestras around the world. His work as a composer in the film industry garnered him two Academy Award nominations for The Prime of Miss Jean Brodie (1969) and A Boy Named Charlie Brown (1969), and his other film scores have included Joanna (1968), Me, Natalie (1969), Scandalous John (1971), The Borrowers (1973) and Emily (1976). McKuen's contribution to A Boy Named Charlie Brown, the first feature-length animation based on Charles M. Schulz's comic strip Peanuts also included him singing the title song. McKuen also earned a mention in the Peanuts strip dated October 3, 1969, in which Sally Brown expresses her frustration that she was sent to the principal's office for an outburst in art class, opining that Pablo Picasso and Rod McKuen surely must have had trouble drawing cows' legs when they were young.

In 1967, McKuen began collaborating with arranger Anita Kerr and the San Sebastian Strings for a series of albums featuring McKuen's poetry recited over Kerr's mood music, including The Sea (1967), The Earth (1967), The Sky (1968), Home to the Sea (1969), For Lovers (1969), and The Soft Sea (1970). Jesse Pearson was the narrator of The Sea and its follow-ups Home to the Sea and The Soft Sea, while most other albums in the series had McKuen narrating. In 1969, Frank Sinatra commissioned an entire album of poems and songs by McKuen; arranged by Don Costa, it was released under the title A Man Alone: The Words and Music of Rod McKuen. The album featured the song "Love's Been Good to Me", which became one of McKuen's best-known songs.

McKuen performed solo in a half-hour special broadcast by NBC on May 10, 1969. The program, billed as McKuen's "first television special", featured the songs "The Loner", "The World I Used to Know", "The Complete Madame Butterfly", "I've Been to Town", "Kaleidoscope", "Stanyan Street", "Lonesome Cities", "Listen to the Warm", "Trashy", and "Merci Beaucoup". It was produced by Lee Mendelson, producer of the Peanuts specials, and directed by Marty Pasetta. James Trittipo designed a set that was "evocative of waterfront pilings" and Arthur Greenslade conducted the orchestra. In 1971, he hosted a series, The Rod McKuen Show, on BBC television in the UK. McKuen's Academy Award-nominated composition "Jean", sung by Oliver, reached No.1 in 1969 on the Billboard Adult Contemporary chart and stayed there for four weeks. In 1971, his song "I Think of You" was a major hit for Perry Como. Other popular McKuen compositions included "The World I Used to Know", "Rock Gently", "Doesn't Anybody Know My Name", "The Importance of the Rose", "Without a Worry in the World", and "Soldiers Who Want to Be Heroes".

In 1971, McKuen became popular in the Netherlands, where the singles "Soldiers Who Want to Be Heroes" and "Without a Worry in the World" reached number one in the charts, as did the album Greatest Hits, Vol. 3. All three discs earned him gold records; in 1971 he was voted the Netherlands' most popular entertainer by Radio Veronica's audience.

During the 1970s, McKuen began composing larger-scale orchestral compositions, writing a series of concertos, suites, symphonies, and chamber pieces for orchestra. He continued publishing a steady stream of poetry books throughout the decade. In 1977, he published Finding My Father, a chronicle of his search for information on his biological father. The book and its publicity helped make such information more readily available to adopted children. He also continued to record, releasing albums such as New Ballads (1970), Pastorale (1971), and the country-rock outing McKuen Country (1976).

McKuen continued to perform concerts around the world and appeared regularly at New York's Carnegie Hall throughout the 1970s, making sporadic appearances as recently as the early 2000s.

== Later years ==
In 1973, at 40 years of age, McKuen radically changed his outward appearance: he no longer bleached his hair and he grew a beard. In August 1974 he delivered a memorial service eulogy for his long-time friend Clay Shaw.

McKuen retired from live performances in 1981. The following year, he was diagnosed with clinical depression, which he battled for much of the next decade. He continued to write poetry, however, and made appearances as a voice-over actor in The Little Mermaid and on its spin-off TV series, as well as on the TV series The Critic.

2001 saw the publication of McKuen's A Safe Place to Land, which contains 160 pages of new poetry. For 10 years he gave an annual birthday concert at Carnegie Hall or the Lincoln Center. He released the double CD The Platinum Collection and was remastering all of his RCA and Warner Bros. recordings for release as CD boxed sets. In addition to his artistic pursuits he was the Executive President of the American Guild of Variety Artists (AGVA), a post he held longer than any other man or woman elected to the position.

McKuen lived in Beverly Hills, California, with his partner Edward Habib, whom he called his "brother", and four cats in a large rambling Spanish house built in 1928, which housed one of the world's largest private record collections. He died of respiratory arrest as a result of pneumonia at a hospital in Beverly Hills, California, on January 29, 2015.

== LGBT activism ==
McKuen never publicly identified with a particular sexual orientation, though he did describe his sexuality by saying, "I can't imagine choosing one sex over the other, that's just too limiting. I can't even honestly say I have a preference." He was active in the LGBT rights movement, and as early as the 1950s, he was a key member of the San Francisco chapter of the Mattachine Society, one of the nation's earliest LGBT advocacy organizations.

McKuen often avoided gender references in the lyrics of his love songs. He frequently gave benefit performances to aid LGBT rights organizations and to fund AIDS research.

Slide... Easy In (1977)

=== Slide, Easy In... ===
The cover of McKuen's 1977 album Easy In..., released under the name Slide, featured a photo of popular gay adult actor Bruno's arm gripping a handful of vegetable shortening; the can was a pastiche of Crisco – then widely used by gay men as a sexual lubricant for fisting– with the label instead reading "Disco". An inscription on the cover stated "this was a project everyone had to get into; not just on the surface, but deeply—and together. If you don't feel "easy in" then perhaps your threshold of pain or pleasure needs looking into."

That same year, McKuen spoke out against singer Anita Bryant and her "Save Our Children" campaign to repeal an anti-discrimination ordinance in Miami, tagging Bryant with the nickname "Ginny Orangeseed" and also including a song on Slide... Easy In titled "Don't Drink the Orange Juice"—which the album cover states was written and recorded on her birthday—referencing Bryant's fame as commercial spokesperson for the Florida Citrus Commission.

The last track on the album is titled "Full Moon Over The Ansonia Hotel." Until 1976, the Ansonia had been home to the Continental Baths, a gay bathhouse and dance club.

== Criticism ==
Despite his popular appeal, McKuen's work was never taken seriously by critics or academics. Michael Baers observed in Gale Research's St. James Encyclopedia of Popular Culture that "through the years his books have drawn uniformly unkind reviews. In fact, criticism of his poetry is uniformly vituperative ..." In a Washington Post obituary, Matt Schudel suggests that McKuen's commercial success engendered a backlash from the literary community. McKuen himself quipped that "The most unforgivable sin in the world is to be a bestselling poet".

Frank W. Hoffmann, in Arts and Entertainment Fads, described McKuen's poetry as "tailor-made for the 1960s ... poetry with a verse that drawled in country cadences from one shapeless line to the next, carrying the rusticated innocence of a Carl Sandburg thickened by the treacle of a man who preferred to prettify the world before he described it".

Philosopher and social critic Robert C. Solomon described McKuen's poetry as "sweet kitsch", and, at the height of his popularity in 1969, Newsweek magazine called him "the King of Kitsch".

Writer and literary critic Nora Ephron said, "[F]or the most part, McKuen's poems are superficial and platitudinous and frequently silly." Pulitzer Prize-winning US Poet Laureate Karl Shapiro said, "It is irrelevant to speak of McKuen as a poet. His poetry is not even trash."

In a Chicago Tribune interview with McKuen in 2001 as he was "testing the waters" for a comeback tour, Pulitzer Prize-winning culture critic Julia Keller said "Millions more have loathed him [...] finding his work so schmaltzy and smarmy that it makes the pronouncements of Kathie Lee Gifford sound like Susan Sontag", and that his work "drives many people crazy. They find it silly and mawkish, the kind of gooey schmaltz that wouldn't pass muster in a freshman creative-writing class" while stating that "The masses ate him up with a spoon, while highbrow literary critics roasted him on a spit." She noted that the third concert on his tour had already been canceled because of sluggish ticket sales.

In May 2019, Backbeat Books published A Voice of the Warm: The Life of Rod McKuen by Barry Alfonso. This was the first in-depth biography of McKuen. In his introduction to the book, singer and music historian Michael Feinstein wrote that McKuen's life and work held a significant place in pop culture:

[McKuen] knew how to create something that made a reader or listener say, 'That's me.' Like Gershwin's, his work is a document of the time in which it was created. But what he did also transcends that time and still speaks fundamentally to the things that matter to people: romance, relationships, the human condition. Those things don't change. He used the vernacular of his time to reach the widest audience. But at its essence, his work is still valid and, I think, timeless.

== Bibliography ==
=== Poetry ===
- And Autumn Came (Pageant Press, 1954)
- Stanyan Street & Other Sorrows (Stanyan Music, 1966)
- Listen to the Warm (Random House, 1967)
- Lonesome Cities (Random House, 1968)
- And Autumn Came (Revised Edition) (Cheval Books, 1969)
- In Someone's Shadow (Cheval Books/Random House, 1969)
- Twelve Years of Christmas (Cheval Books/Random House, 1969)
- Caught in the Quiet (Stanyan Books, 1970)
- Fields of Wonder (Cheval Books/Random House, 1971)
- The Carols of Christmas (Cheval Books/Random House, 1971)
- And to Each Season (Simon & Schuster, 1972)
- Moment to Moment (Cheval Books, 1972)
- Come to Me in Silence (Simon & Schuster, 1973)
- Moment to Moment (Revised Edition) (Simon & Schuster, 1974)
- Beyond the Boardwalk (Cheval Books, 1975)
- Celebrations of the Heart (Simon & Schuster, 1975)
- The Sea Around Me... (Simon & Schuster, 1975)
- Coming Close to the Earth (Simon & Schuster, 1978)
- We Touch the Sky (Simon & Schuster, 1979)
- The Power Bright and Shining (Simon & Schuster, 1980)
- A Book of Days (Harper & Row, 1980)
- The Beautiful Strangers (Simon & Schuster, 1981)
- Book of Days and a Month of Sundays (Harper & Row, 1981)
- The Sound of Solitude (Harper & Row, 1983)
- Suspension Bridge (Harper & Row, 1984)
- Intervals (Harper & Row/Cheval Books, 1986)
- Valentines (Harper & Row/Cheval Books, 1986)
- A Safe Place to Land (Cheval Books, 2001)
- Rusting in the Rain (Cheval Books, 2004)

=== Lyrics ===
- The Songs of Rod McKuen (Cheval Books, 1969)
- With Love (Stanyan Books, 1970)
- New Ballads (Stanyan Books, 1970)
- Pastorale (Stanyan Books, 1971)
- The Carols Christmas (Cheval/Random House, 1971)
- Grand Tour (Stanyan Books, 1972)

=== Prose ===
- Finding My Father (Coward, McCann & Geoghegan, 1976)
- An Outstretched Hand (Cheval Books/Harper & Row, 1980)

=== Original paperbacks ===
- Seasons in the Sun (Pocket Books, 1974)
- Alone (Pocket Books, 1975)
- Hand in Hand (Pocket Books, 1977)
- Finding My Father (Cheval Books/Berkeley Books, 1977)
- Love's Been Good to Me (Pocket Books, 1979)
- Looking for a Friend (Pocket Books, 1980)
- Too Many Midnights (Pocket Books, 1981)
- Watch for the Wind (Pocket Books, 1983)
