= Incense and Peppermints =

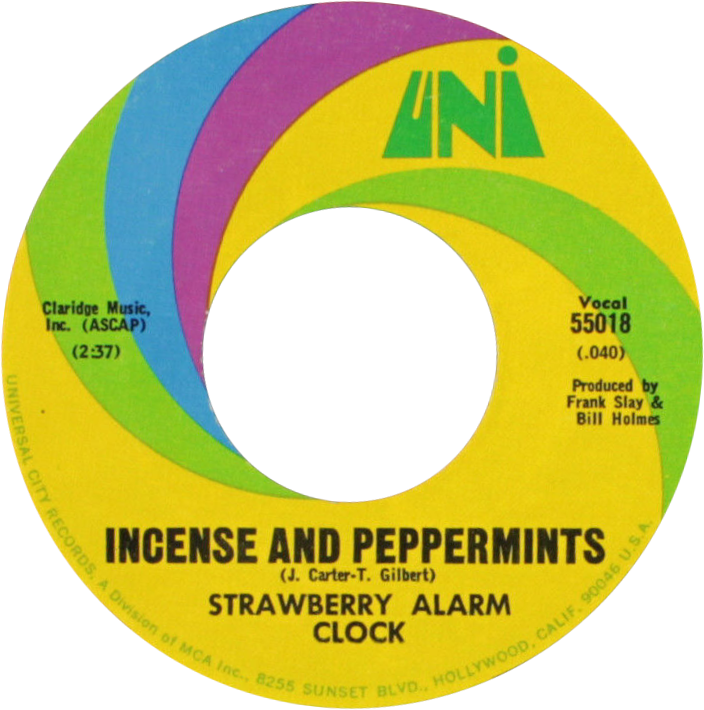
- Side A of the 1967 US single

Single by Strawberry Alarm Clock

from the album Incense and Peppermints
- B-side: "The Birdman of Alkatrash"
- Released: May 19, 1967
- Recorded: 1967
- Genre: Sunshine pop; psychedelic pop; psychedelic rock; acid rock
- Length: 2:47
- Label: UNI
- Songwriters: John S. Carter; Tim Gilbert; (uncredited: Mark Weitz, Ed King)
- Producers: Frank Slay, Bill Holmes

Strawberry Alarm Clock singles chronology
"Incense and Peppermints" (1967)	"Tomorrow" (1967)

Official audio
- "Incense And Peppermints" on YouTube

"Incense and Peppermints" is a 1967 song by the American psychedelic rock band Strawberry Alarm Clock. The song is officially credited as having been written by John S. Carter and Tim Gilbert, although it was based on an instrumental idea by band members Mark Weitz and Ed King. It was released as a single in May 1967 by Uni Records and reached the number one position on the Billboard Hot 100 for one week in November of that year. Although the single was released in the United Kingdom, it failed to break into the UK Singles Chart. The song was featured in the film Austin Powers: International Man of Mystery and the television series Daisy Jones and the Six.

== History ==
Prior to the release of "Incense and Peppermints," the band had already issued four singles ("Long Day's Care" / "Can't Explain", "My Flash on You" / "Fortune Teller", "In the Building" / "Hey Joe", and "Heart Full of Rain" / "First Plane Home") on All-American Records as Thee Sixpence.

During the recording sessions for "Incense and Peppermints," the band members were not considered a right fit for the lead vocal track, which John S. Carter had written using a rhyming dictionary, so the lead vocals were sung by Greg Munford, a friend of the band who was present at the recording session. The regular vocalists in the band provided backing and harmony vocals on the record.

Band members Mark Weitz and Ed King were both denied songwriting credits by producer Frank Slay despite the fact that they contributed to the song. The songwriting credits instead went to Carter and his songwriting partner Tim Gilbert. King would go on to greater fame as a member of the Southern rock band Lynyrd Skynyrd.

"Incense and Peppermints" initially appeared on the B-side of Thee Sixpence's fifth single, "The Birdman of Alkatrash," released on All-American in April 1967. However, local radio stations began playing "Incense and Peppermints" instead of the A-side, and the song began to gain in popularity in and around Los Angeles. Sensing the possibility of a national hit, Uni Records picked up the record for national distribution, and the single was re-released in May with the sides reversed. By the time of this second pressing, the band had changed its name to "The Strawberry Alarm Clock" to avoid confusion with another local band.

"Incense and Peppermints" spent 16 weeks on the Billboard chart, reaching the number 1 spot for the week ending November 25, 1967. The single earned a gold disc from the RIAA on December 7 for sales of one million copies.

== Charts ==
=== Weekly singles charts ===
Chart (1967)	Peak position
Australia Go-Set	35
Canada Top Singles (RPM)	20
Canada CHUM Hit Parade	1
New Zealand (Listener)	13
US Billboard Hot 100	1
US Cash Box Top 100	1

=== Year-end charts ===
Chart (1967)	Rank
Canada (RPM)	43
US Billboard Hot 100	23
US Cash Box Top 100	27
