= Mark Weitz =

American musician (born 1945)

Mark Stephen Weitz (born 1945) is an American musician. A keyboard player for the 1960s psychedelic rock group Strawberry Alarm Clock, Weitz was the principal composing member of the band. Additionally, Weitz has been Hollywood's go to fish wrangler in films such as Batman, Seinfeld, and Hell's Kitchen. He now owns a fish store in North Hollywood, and builds custom aquariums.

== Biography ==
Weitz was born Mark Stephen Weitz in Brooklyn, New York, in 1945 and at 6 months old moved to California. He took up playing piano and organ at age 8 and at age 20 joined a rock group called Thee Sixpence as one of the singers and the organist. Three or four years older than everyone else, he had more definite musical ideas than his bandmates, as well as a more mature and professional outlook on music, which served them well the next four years.

Weitz was an able composer, and for the group's 1967 single on the all American label he submitted three songs: "The Birdman of Alkatrash", "Heart full of Rain", and "Incense and Peppermints". The latter, turned over to another composer by the record's producer to write the lyrics, became a #1 national hit for the group, newly christened Strawberry Alarm Clock.

Weitz played keyboards for Smashing Pumpkins frontman Billy Corgan's side project Spirits in the Sky, which toured for several weeks in 2009. Weitz first played with the band at a memorial concert for Sky Saxon, the late singer for the Seeds. In 2010, the Strawberry Alarm Clock was working on material for Corgan's new record label.

Mark Weitz and Ed King wrote the melody for Incense and Peppermints, with John Carter composing the Lyrics. When the hit single was pressed, SAC Manager Bill Holmes left Weitz and King off the credits. The band's main composers were never able to recover those lost royalties.
