= The Byrds' Greatest Hits =

Greatest hits album by the Byrds
- Released: August 7, 1967
- Recorded: January 20, 1965 – December 8, 1966
- Studio: Columbia, Hollywood
- Genre: Rock; pop; folk rock; psychedelic rock
- Length: 32:17
- Label: Columbia
- Producer: Terry Melcher, Allen Stanton, Gary Usher

The Byrds chronology
Younger Than Yesterday (1967)	The Byrds' Greatest Hits (1967)	The Notorious Byrd Brothers (1968)

Alternative Cover
- Cover of the 1991 reissue

The Byrds' Greatest Hits is the first greatest hits album by the American rock band the Byrds and was released in August 1967 on Columbia Records. It is the top-selling album in the Byrds' catalogue and reached number 6 on the Billboard Top LPs chart, but failed to chart in the UK.

== Content ==
The album provides a summary of the Byrds' history during Gene Clark and David Crosby's original tenure with the band and also functions as a survey of the group's hit singles from 1965 to 1967, a period when the band had its greatest amount of success on the singles chart. Most of the band's U.S. A-sides from this period are included on the album, along with three of their more important album tracks: "I'll Feel a Whole Lot Better", "The Bells of Rhymney", and "Chimes of Freedom". The three U.S. singles from this period that are not included on the album are "Set You Free This Time", "Have You Seen Her Face" and "Lady Friend" (although these songs have been included as bonus tracks on various CD reissues of the album). All of the songs included on the original Greatest Hits album can also be found on the band's first four albums, Mr. Tambourine Man, Turn! Turn! Turn!, Fifth Dimension and Younger Than Yesterday.

The eight tracks on The Byrds' Greatest Hits that had been singles peaked at the following positions on the Billboard Hot 100: "5D (Fifth Dimension)" number 44; "All I Really Want to Do" number 40; "Mr. Spaceman" number 36; "My Back Pages" number 30; "So You Want to Be a Rock 'n' Roll Star" number 29; "Eight Miles High" number 14; "Turn! Turn! Turn!" number 1; and "Mr. Tambourine Man" number 1. In addition, four of the singles included on the album had charted in the United Kingdom, peaking at the following positions on the UK Singles Chart: "Turn! Turn! Turn!" number 26; "Eight Miles High" number 24; "All I Really Want to Do" number 4; and "Mr. Tambourine Man" number 1.

Author Johnny Rogan has stated that, in particular, "Eight Miles High", "Turn! Turn! Turn!", and "Mr. Tambourine Man" were widely influential during the 1960s, a time when singles, at least in pop music, were as important in their own right as albums, and generally more so. Rogan further opined that "Turn! Turn! Turn!" summed up the decade's counter-cultural values as much as "Blowin' in the Wind", "(I Can't Get No) Satisfaction" or "All You Need Is Love", while "Mr. Tambourine Man" and "Eight Miles High" helped to introduce the subgenres of folk rock and psychedelic rock respectively into the popular music of the day.

== Release ==
The Byrds' Greatest Hits was released on August 7, 1967 in the United States (catalogue item CL 2716 in mono, CS 9516 in stereo) and October 20, 1967 in the United Kingdom (catalogue item BPG 63107 in mono, SBPG 63107 in stereo). The album was certified Gold by the Recording Industry Association of America within a year of its release, eventually being certified platinum on November 21, 1986.

The album was first issued on CD by Columbia Records in 1985 and was later re-released in a remastered form in 1991 with alternative cover artwork. In the UK and Europe, this 1991 edition of the album was titled Greatest Hits: 18 Classics Remastered and included an additional seven bonus tracks taken from the Byrds' post Younger Than Yesterday career (a period not covered by the original album). The album was remastered again at 20-bit resolution as part of the Columbia/Legacy Byrds series and reissued in an expanded and remixed form on March 30, 1999. The three bonus tracks on the 1999 reissue included two of the remaining singles from the Byrds' 1965–1967 career, plus the number 63 charting B-side, "It Won't Be Wrong". The album was reissued again in the SACD format on January 30, 2001, with the same expanded track listing as on the 20-bit remaster.

On March 16, 2009 Sony Music released a new Byrds compilation titled Greatest Hits as part of their Steel Box Collection series. This compilation album is not the same as the original The Byrds' Greatest Hits album, although it does have four of the same tracks in common.

== Reception ==
Upon release, The Byrds' Greatest Hits was met with positive reviews. Paul Williams enthusiastically waxed lyrical about the album in a review published in Crawdaddy! magazine: "Any greatest hits album is insignificant. By definition it contains nothing unfamiliar; and yet this very fact offers great potential beauty, for a well-made greatest hits LP might then unleash the emotion of familiarity in an artistic context. The Byrds have achieved that goal: always masters of the form, they have now taken the concept of a great hits anthology and created from it an essay into rediscovery." WCFL Beat magazine was also complimentary about the album, noting that, during the mid-1960s British Invasion, the Byrds were the only American band to "help to revolutionize the pop scene and to pave the way for the so-called psychedelic music of today." In the UK, Record Mirror gave the album a top rating of 4 stars, while commenting "This is a chronological collection of their singles and is really something. Their sound has progressed from the Dylanesque to the sound which is one of the best in the pop world." A November 1967 review of the album in Beat Instrumental declared "This is probably the best collection LP to come out of the states this year, and has songs that won't date for years to come."

In recent years, Stephen Thomas Erlewine, in his review for the AllMusic website, has described the album as "pretty close to a definitive single-disc summary of the Byrds' prime." Sarah Zupko also praised the album in her PopMatters review, noting: "The Byrds perfectly captured the mood of their time." In his review of the SACD version of the album for the Music Tap website, Robert Olsen described the album as "a compilation album featuring some of the better known recordings from the first 4 albums." Olsen went on to note that "The first album is over-represented, and there's an unwholesome emphasis on the Dylan cuts. Nevertheless, at the time the album was stunning in its breadth and provided the next generation with a good sample of the sound and direction of the group." Peter Kane found no issue with "the clarity of the originals" when reviewing the 1991 re-release for Q magazine.

The album was included in Robert Christgau's "Basic Record Library" of 1950s and 1960s recordings, published in Christgau's Record Guide: Rock Albums of the Seventies (1981). In 2003, the album was ranked at number 178 on Rolling Stone magazine's list of The 500 Greatest Albums of All Time, although it was dropped when the list when was updated in 2012.

== Track listing ==
=== Side one ===
1. "Mr. Tambourine Man" (Bob Dylan) – 2:29
2. "I'll Feel a Whole Lot Better" (Gene Clark) – 2:32
3. "The Bells of Rhymney" (Idris Davies, Pete Seeger) – 3:30
4. "Turn! Turn! Turn! (To Everything There Is a Season)" (Book of Ecclesiastes/Pete Seeger) – 3:49
5. "All I Really Want to Do" (Bob Dylan) – 2:04
6. "Chimes of Freedom" (Bob Dylan) – 3:51

=== Side two ===
1. "Eight Miles High" (Gene Clark, Jim McGuinn, David Crosby) – 3:34
2. "Mr. Spaceman" (Jim McGuinn) – 2:09
3. "5D (Fifth Dimension)" (Jim McGuinn) – 2:33
4. "So You Want to Be a Rock 'n' Roll Star" (Jim McGuinn, Chris Hillman) – 1:50
5. "My Back Pages" (Bob Dylan) – 3:08

=== 1991 reissue bonus tracks ===
12. "Jesus Is Just Alright" (Arthur Reynolds) – 2:08
13. "Chestnut Mare" (Roger McGuinn, Jacques Levy) – 5:07
14. "I Trust" (Roger McGuinn) – 3:17
15. "Lady Friend" (David Crosby) – 2:35
16. "Lay Lady Lay" (Bob Dylan) – 3:16
17. "Ballad of Easy Rider" (Roger McGuinn) – 2:02
18. "Glory, Glory" (Arthur Reynolds) – 4:03

=== 1999 reissue bonus tracks ===
12. "It Won't Be Wrong" (Jim McGuinn, Harvey Gerst) – 1:58
13. "Set You Free This Time" (Gene Clark) – 2:49
14. "Have You Seen Her Face" (Chris Hillman) – 2:40

== Personnel ==
Adapted from So You Want to Be a Rock 'n' Roll Star: The Byrds Day-By-Day (1965–1973), The Byrds: Timeless Flight Revisited, various compact disc liner notes, and other online sources:

Credits refer only to the original 11 track album.

The Byrds

- Jim McGuinn – guitar, vocals
- Gene Clark – tambourine, vocals
- David Crosby – guitar, vocals
- Chris Hillman – electric bass, vocals
- Michael Clarke – drums

Additional personnel

- Jerry Cole – rhythm guitar on "Mr. Tambourine Man"
- Larry Knechtel – electric bass on "Mr. Tambourine Man"
- Hal Blaine – drums on "Mr. Tambourine Man"
- Leon Russell – electric piano on "Mr. Tambourine Man"
- Van Dyke Parks – organ on "5D (Fifth Dimension)"
- Hugh Masekela – trumpet on "So You Want to Be a Rock 'n' Roll Star"

== Release history ==
Date	Label	Format	Country	Catalog	Notes
August 7, 1967	Columbia	LP	US	CL 2716	Original mono release.
August 7, 1967	Columbia	LP	US	CS 9516	Original stereo release.
October 20, 1967	CBS	LP	UK	BPG 63107	Original mono release.
October 20, 1967	CBS	LP	UK	SBPG 63107	Original stereo release.
1976	Embassy	LP	UK	EMB 31381	
1985	Columbia	CD	US	CK 9516	Original CD release.
1985	CBS	LP	UK	32068	
1985	CBS	CD	UK	CDCBS 32068	
1991	Columbia	CD	US	467843 2	Titled Greatest Hits: Re-Mastered with alternative cover artwork.
1991	Sony	LP	UK	COL 467843 1	Titled Greatest Hits: Re-Mastered with alternative cover artwork.
1991	Sony	CD	UK	COL 468316 2	Titled Greatest Hits: 18 Classics Remastered with alternative cover artwork and seven bonus tracks.
March 30, 1999	Columbia/Legacy	CD	US	CK 66230	Reissue containing three bonus tracks and a stereo remix of the entire album.
January 30, 2001	Columbia/Legacy	CD	US	CS 66230	SACD reissue containing three bonus tracks and a stereo remix of the entire album.
2003	Sony	CD	Japan	MHCP-107	Reissue containing three bonus tracks and a stereo remix of the album in a replica LP sleeve.
