= Ananda Shankar (album) =

Studio album by Ananda Shankar
- Released: April 1970
- Studio: Producer's home studio, Hollywood
- Genre: Raga rock
- Length: 40:35
- Label: Reprise
- Producer: Alex Hassilev

Ananda Shankar is the debut album by the Indian musician Ananda Shankar, the son of dancer and choreographer Uday Shankar and the nephew of the Indian classical musician Ravi Shankar. It was released in 1970 on the Reprise record label. The album fuses Indian music with Western rock and electronic music, and was among the first works in the rock genre by an Indian musician. Consisting mainly of instrumental recordings featuring sitar and Moog synthesizer, it includes a cover version of the Rolling Stones' 1968 hit song "Jumpin' Jack Flash" and a thirteen-minute Indian-style piece titled "Sagar (The Ocean)".

Ananda Shankar followed a series of sitar-based releases by artists hoping to capitalise on the mid-1960s raga rock trend. Initially conceived as a collaboration with guitarist Jimi Hendrix, it was instead recorded in Los Angeles by Shankar with contributors such as synthesizer exponent Paul Lewinson. In the decades since the LP's release, "Jumpin' Jack Flash" became a popular club hit, while the album has been recognised for its influence on world music fusion, particularly the East–West styles developed in the UK. It is one of the albums featured in Robert Dimery's book 1001 Albums You Must Hear Before You Die.

== Background ==
The son of Indian dance pioneer Uday Shankar, Ananda Shankar left Bombay in the late 1960s for California, where his uncle, Indian classical musician and composer Ravi Shankar, had been based since 1967. Ananda spent time in San Francisco before settling in Los Angeles, where he became immersed in the psychedelic music scene. A trained sitarist, he began playing with rock guitarist Jimi Hendrix, who suggested that they record an album together in 1968. According to Shankar, he thought about it for three days but declined Hendrix's offer, reasoning that "it wouldn't be my music. So I made the album alone."

Shankar envisioned a musical form that blended Indian classical music with Western rock and electronic styles. Although fusing rock or pop with Indian influences was common among Western artists during the psychedelic era, particularly after the Beatles had included sitar on their 1965 song "Norwegian Wood", Shankar was among the first Indian musicians to attempt it. The album was produced by Alex Hassilev, who secured the support of Reprise Records. Hassilev said he was interested in the potential of a project that combined sitar, Moog synthesizer and percussion, having produced the 1967 album The Zodiac: Cosmic Sounds, which was one of the first to feature a Moog. Shankar's main collaborator was Paul Lewinson, a keyboard player who had mastered the Moog system set up at Hassilev's home.

== Recording ==
The idea of fusing Indian music with synth was pretty noble. For Ananda to break away from the traditional use of the sitar was brave ... No one had done that in this way yet. George Harrison had introduced the rock world to the sitar and Ananda's family tree a few years earlier, and I think Ananda made a good account of himself.

– James Lowe, engineer and co-producer on Ananda Shankar

Recording for Ananda Shankar took place in the basement studio at Hassilev's house, on West Knoll Drive in Hollywood. The engineer and co-producer was James Lowe, formerly the vocalist of the psychedelic rock band the Electric Prunes. Aside from Pranish Khan on tabla, all the contributors were Western musicians playing rock instrumentation; Lowe termed them "our own 'wrecking crew'". Among the participants were Jerry Scheff, the bassist in Elvis Presley's touring band, and drummers Mike Botts and Joe Pollard. The other musicians were guitarists Drake Levin and Dick Rosmini, and bass player Mark Tulin, Lowe's former bandmate in the Electric Prunes.

The majority of the songs were co-written by Shankar and Lewinson, who was also credited as musical arranger. According to Hassilev, the potential for improvisation among the musicians was limited by the difficulties presented by the Moog synthesizer. The inclusion of cover versions of the Rolling Stones' "Jumpin' Jack Flash" and the Doors' "Light My Fire" was another compromise. These two tracks ensured that the album would have instant appeal for a rock audience in the manner of the various sitar-based LPs that had resulted from the popularity of raga rock since 1966, including Raga Rock by Harihar Rao and Big Jim Sullivan's Sitar Beat and Lord Sitar. Among the original material on Ananda Shankar, psychedelic influences were especially evident in "Snow Flower", while the thirteen-minute "Sagar (The Ocean)" was the closest to the Indian classical style. For "Raghupati", which was an adaptation of an Indian folk song, ten of Shankar's friends participated in the recording, playing and supplying the chanted chorus.

== Release ==
Ananda Shankar was released in April 1970 with the Reprise catalogue number RS-6398. A message from Shankar appeared on the front cover of the LP: "I have had a dream to try to combine Western and Indian music into a new form, a music which has no particular name but is melodious and touching, and which combines the most modern electronic devices with the old traditional instrument, the sitar." The liner notes stated that "He's as Indian as the tradition in which he received his education as a classical musician, but he's excited about Led Zeppelin and Janis Joplin and electronic music." Also in 1970, Shankar performed his first successful concert as a solo artist.

Hassilev had expected that the commercial performance of the album would be negligible, yet it was sufficient to give Shankar international renown. He followed the album with the 1975 release Ananda Shankar and His Music, which he recorded in India.

== Critical reception and legacy ==
A bizarre mash-up of go-go girls, gurgling guitar, farting Moog and Shankar's nimble sitar lines, the song ("Jumpin' Jack Flash") escaped from its '60s exotic ghetto, finding fans in artists like Beck and LCD Soundsystem's James Murphy and even winding up … on the soundtrack for Grand Theft Auto: Liberty City Stories game.

– Andy Beta of MTV.com, 2012

Writing in the 1993 book Incredibly Strange Music, Volume 1, a reviewer described Shankar's versions of "Jumpin' Jack Flash" and "Light My Fire" as "amazing … raw rockin' raga" and said that his treatment of the Rolling Stones hit liberated the song from its "revered spot" and "the rock mythos". The album was issued on CD by Reprise in 1998, by which point Shankar's work had been appropriated by DJs in London's club scene. The NME described the CD as "one of the most anticipated rereleases in recent years" and predicted that, building on his "famous" Indipop treatment of the Stones' and the Doors' tracks, "Ananda's debut should get the acclaim it deserves." The reviewer also identified Shankar's style of East–West fusion as a forerunner to the British-Asian band Cornershop's reinterpretation of "Norwegian Wood."

"Jumpin' Jack Flash" has since been included on rare groove compilations released by Rhino, including the four-disc set What It Is!, and has won the admiration of musicians such as Beck and James Murphy. In his review of the 2015 dance compilation Slip Disc, on which the song also appears, Robin Denselow of The Guardian said that the track's "furious sitar and synth treatment" serves as "a reminder that Ravi Shankar's nephew was a Rolling Stones fan who used to jam with Jimi Hendrix".

As with his uncle's international career, Shankar's perceived Westernisation of the sitar attracted criticism in India. Writing in 2012, Indian journalist and author Indrajit Hazra derided Ananda Shankar as "drivel" and "certainly 'touching' – but in a way that would put an old man in a children's park away in jail for life". While blaming the album for helping to perpetuate a cheapened cultural image of India, Hazra ridiculed other attempts at East–West fusion before writing in conclusion: "There's always soul-destroying Ananda Shankar, who never seemed to ask himself why no one ever tried to play 'Gangnam Style' on the cello."

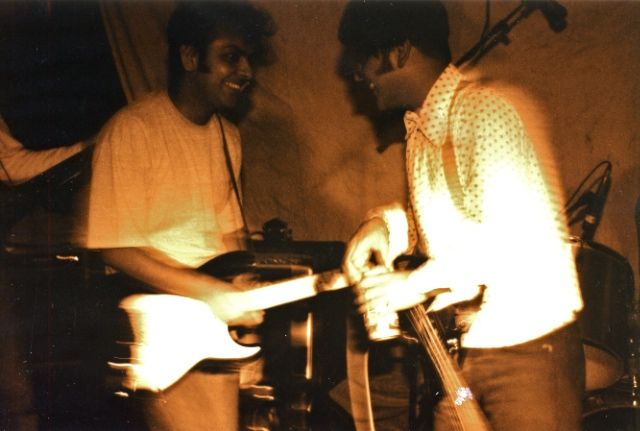
Brothers Tjinder and Avtar Singh of the indie rock band Cornershop. The album has been recognised for its influence on British-Asian musical fusions and other examples of world music.

Ananda Shankar is one of the albums featured in Robert Dimery's book 1001 Albums You Must Hear Before You Die. In his commentary there, Time Out music critic John Lewis says that Shankar's 1970 LP was the most artistically successful of all the "sitar rock" releases that began with Harihar Rao in 1966, and he writes of the album: "Ananda's Moog-fried readings of 'Jumpin' Jack Flash' and 'Light My Fire' still pack out dancefloors today. 'Snow Flower' and 'Mamata' create ambient pop, while 'Metamorphosis' moves into funkier territory. Side two moves the emphasis back toward India with the 13-minute raga-rock epic 'Sagar' and the stomping, chant-based 'Raghupati'." Lewis concludes by saying that, before his death in 1999, "Shankar's fusion style had been adopted by a whole generation of British Asians, his reputation assured."

In his review for AllMusic, Jon Pruett says that to dismiss the album as merely another mix of psychedelia and Indian sounds would be "a huge mistake". He says that over the first three tracks, "Shankar manages to bridge the gap between kitsch and fine art", and he highlights the original compositions as "equally impressive". Referring to the dominance of Western rhythms over Eastern, Pruett adds that after the more Indian-styled "Sagar", "you realize that this record could have been much more than it was." He describes "Raghupati" as "a great mixture of folk guitars that takes the focus away from the sitar for once, instead incorporating vocals and a chorus that manages to lock into a repeated chant that is the unexpected highlight of the album". AllMusic's artist biography for Shankar describes the 1970 album as "a fusion cult classic."

The album was reissued in 2005 by Collectors' Choice Music with a liner note essay by music critic Richie Unterberger. Unterberger writes: "What set Ananda Shankar aside from most such artists [during the raga-rock era] was that he was an Indian musician of distinguished pedigree approaching the East–West fusion from the Eastern direction, rather than the other way around … Ananda Shankar established a solid reputation among collectors over the next few decades, as well as being hailed as a forerunner of the world music fusions that attained global popularity from the 1980s onward."

== Track listing ==
All songs by Ananda Shankar and Paul Lewinson unless otherwise noted.

Side one

1. "Jumpin' Jack Flash" (Mick Jagger, Keith Richards) – 3:40
2. "Snow Flower" – 3:10
3. "Light My Fire" (Jim Morrison, Robbie Krieger, John Densmore, Ray Manzarek) – 3:29
4. "Mamata (Affection)" – 2:50
5. "Metamorphosis" – 6:49

Side two

1. "Sagar (The Ocean)" – 13:13
2. "Dance Indra" (traditional, arranged by Shankar and Lewinson) – 3:49
3. "Raghupati" (folk tune, arranged by Shankar and Lewinson) – 3:35

== Personnel ==
According to the 2005 CD liner notes:

- Ananda Shankar – sitar, vocal on "Raghupati"
- Paul Lewinson – Moog synthesizer, musical arrangements
- Pranish Khan – tabla
- Dick Rosmini – guitar
- Drake Levin – guitar
- Jerry Scheff – bass
- Mark Tulin – bass
- Joe Pollard – drums
- Michael Botts – drums
- uncredited – chorus vocals on "Jumpin' Jack Flash" and "Raghupati"
- uncredited – chanting on "Raghupati"

== Sources ==
- Brend, Mark (2005). Strange Sounds: Offbeat Instruments and Sonic Experiments in Pop. San Francisco, CA: Backbeat Books. ISBN 978-0-879308551.
- Dimery, Robert, ed. (2011). 1001 Albums You Must Hear Before You Die: Revised and Updated Edition. New York, NY: Quintessence. ISBN 978-0-7893-1371-3.
- Holmes, Thom (2012). Electronic and Experimental Music: Technology, Music, and Culture (4th edn). New York: Routledge. ISBN 978-0-415-89636-8.
- Lavezzoli, Peter (2006). The Dawn of Indian Music in the West. New York, NY: Continuum. ISBN 0-8264-2819-3.
- Priore, Domenic (2007). Riot on Sunset Strip: Rock'n'Roll's Last Stand in Hollywood. London: Jawbone Press. ISBN 978-1-906002-04-6.
- Shankar, Ravi (1999). Raga Mala: The Autobiography of Ravi Shankar. New York, NY: Welcome Rain. ISBN 1-56649-104-5.
- Thompson, Dave (2017). Goldmine Record Album Price Guide (9th edn). Iola, WI: Krause Publications. ISBN 978-1-4402-4776-7.
- World Music: The Rough Guide (Volume 2: Latin and North America, Caribbean, India, Asia and Pacific). London: Rough Guides/Penguin. 2000. ISBN 1-85828-636-0.
