= Why (The Byrds song) =

1966 song by the Byrds

- West German picture sleeve

Single by the Byrds
- A-side: "Eight Miles High"
- Released: March 14, 1966
- Recorded: January 24–25, 1966
- Studio: Columbia, Hollywood
- Genre: Psychedelic rock; raga rock; rhythm and blues; pop
- Length: 2:59
- Label: Columbia
- Songwriters: Jim McGuinn, David Crosby
- Producer: Allen Stanton

The Byrds singles chronology
"It Won't Be Wrong" (1966)	"Eight Miles High" / "Why" (1966)	"5D (Fifth Dimension)" (1966)

"Why"

Song by the Byrds

from the album Younger Than Yesterday
- Released: February 6, 1967
- Recorded: December 5–8, 1966
- Studio: Columbia, Hollywood
- Genre: Psychedelic rock, raga rock
- Length: 2:45
- Label: Columbia
- Songwriters: Jim McGuinn, David Crosby
- Producer: Gary Usher

"Why" is a song by the American rock band the Byrds, written by Jim McGuinn and David Crosby and first released as the B-side of the band's "Eight Miles High" single in March 1966. The song was re-recorded in December 1966 and released for a second time as part of the band's Younger Than Yesterday album.

Born from Crosby's fondness for the music of Ravi Shankar, the song was an attempt to assimilate traditional Indian music into a rock and pop format. However, rather than actually using Indian instruments on the song, the band instead used McGuinn's raga-flavored guitar playing to emulate the sound of the sitar. "Why", along with "Eight Miles High", was influential in developing the musical styles of psychedelic rock and raga rock.

== Conception ==
The song was written predominantly by David Crosby in late 1965 and was largely inspired by his love of the Indian classical music of Ravi Shankar. Crosby's affection for Indian ragas stemmed from his friendship with the session guitarist Eric Hord, who would often play in a style approximating the drone-like qualities of traditional Indian music. Crosby's love of the genre was further cemented when he was invited by the Byrds' manager, Jim Dickson, to attend a Ravi Shankar recording session at World Pacific Studios in Los Angeles. Dickson later recalled Crosby's reaction to Shankar's music: "When he saw Ravi Shankar, it blew him away. He was all excited. He gets hyper from things like that. It was fun to turn him on to stuff."

Crosby became a vocal advocate of Indian music, and Shankar in particular, often dropping the musician's name in contemporary interviews. During meetings with the Beatles in 1965, Crosby's enthusiasm for Shankar's music began to rub off on the Fab Four and in particular George Harrison, who was enthralled by Crosby's descriptions of Indian scales and the sitar. In his autobiography Long Time Gone, Crosby recalled these meetings with the Beatles and his influence on their subsequent exploration of Indian music: "there are people that tell me I turned him [Harrison] on to Indian music. I know I was turning everybody I met on to Ravi Shankar because I thought that Ravi Shankar and John Coltrane were the two greatest melodic creators on the planet and I think I was probably right."

Crosby's bandmates in the Byrds bore the brunt of his effusive enthusiasm for Indian music and were regularly exposed to Shankar's recordings as a consequence. During the band's November 1965 U.S. tour, Crosby brought a cassette recording of one of Shankar's albums along to alleviate the boredom of traveling from show to show and the music was on constant rotation on the tour bus. The influence of Shankar's music on the band, and in particular on lead guitarist Jim McGuinn, would later find full expression in the music of "Why".

== Composition and recording ==
Crosby's original lyrics for the song were a commentary on his mother's dominance during his adolescence and began with the line, "Keep saying no to me since I was a baby." Dickson expressed concern over the suitability of these lyrics, and it was McGuinn who eventually solved the problem, by suggesting that the lyrics be altered to "Keep saying no to her", thus making the song a commentary on a girl whose mother restricted her independence. Talking to the Byrds' biographer Johnny Rogan in 1989, Dickson recalled the events surrounding the lyric change: "When I heard the lyric, I thought it was atrocious. One word changed the whole thing and McGuinn thought it up. It was an inspired thought in a crisis." However, Crosby has disputed this version of events, claiming sole authorship of the song and maintaining that the song's lyrics were written entirely by him and were complete in their finished form prior to recording of the song.

A studio recording of "Why" (along with "Eight Miles High") was first attempted at RCA Studios in Los Angeles on December 22, 1965, but Columbia Records refused to release these recordings because they had not been made at a Columbia-owned studio. The RCA recordings remained unreleased for more than twenty years and were finally issued on the 1987 archival album, Never Before. They were also included on the 1996 Columbia/Legacy CD reissue of the band's Fifth Dimension album. At the insistence of Columbia Records, both "Why" and "Eight Miles High" were re-recorded at Columbia Studios, Hollywood, on January 24 and 25, 1966, under the watchful eye of producer Allen Stanton, and it was these recordings that were included on the single release.

Following its release on the B-side of the "Eight Miles High" single, Crosby chose to revive the song during recording sessions for the Byrds' fourth album, Younger Than Yesterday. Exactly why Crosby insisted on resurrecting the song when there was other, newer original material in reserve has never been adequately explained by the band themselves. However, the band's roadie Jimmi Seiter has stated in an interview that the song was re-recorded because the band were unhappy with the previously released version and because another Crosby-penned song was required in order for the guitarist to have an equal share of writing credits on the album. The group re-recorded the song between December 5 and December 8, 1966, with Gary Usher in the producer's chair. Although the song's Indian influences were still present in the re-recorded version, Rogan has commented that they were somewhat watered down when compared to the original B-side recording.

== Music ==
Musically, "Why" is highlighted by McGuinn's whining guitar sound and Chris Hillman's gulping bass guitar playing. The verses have a vaguely Motownesque feel to them, recalling "(Love Is Like a) Heat Wave" by Martha and the Vandellas, but the instrumental break features a raga-flavored lead guitar solo by McGuinn that lasts almost a full minute. Author Peter Lavezzoli has remarked that such an explicit juxtaposition of rhythm and blues and Indian modal improvisation was wholly without precedent in popular music at the time.

Although the song broke new ground in rock music with its Indian influences, it didn't actually feature the sound of a sitar. Instead, the song features raga-influenced scales played on McGuinn's twelve-string Rickenbacker guitar, which was run through a custom-made device designed to emulate the sound of a sitar. McGuinn explained this device in a 1977 interview: "We used this special gadget I had made. It was an amplifier from a Philips portable record player and a two-and-a-half inch loudspeaker from a walkie-talkie placed in a wooden cigar box which ran on batteries, and it had such a tremendous sustain that it sounded very much like a sitar."

== Release and reception ==
"Why" was released as the B-side of "Eight Miles High" on March 14, 1966, in the U.S. and May 29, 1966, in the UK. The single reached number 14 on the Billboard Hot 100 and number 24 on the UK Singles Chart. The song was released for a second time, in a completely different version, as part of the Byrds' Younger Than Yesterday album on February 6, 1967.

Along with "Eight Miles High", the song's use of Indian musical modes was immediately influential on the emerging genre of psychedelic rock. In addition, promotional press material for the single was responsible for the naming of the musical subgenre raga rock, a term which was used to describe the song's blend of western rock music and Indian ragas. Many reviews of the single made use of the phrase, but it was journalist Sally Kempton, in her review of the single for The Village Voice, who used the term "raga rock" in print for the very first time.

Although contemporary reviews for the single naturally focused on the A-side, Cash Box singled out the B-side for special praise, stating "'Why' is a pulsating tale concerning lack of personal communication between a couple who are going steady." Additionally, Richard Goldstein in his review of the Younger Than Yesterday album in The Village Voice described "Why" as "a solid hard-rocker." More recently, author Peter Lavezzoli, in his book The Dawn of Indian music in the West has commented that while the Beatles, the Yardbirds, and the Kinks had all used sitars or Indian-style drones as instrumental decoration in their songs, "Why", and to a lesser extent "Eight Miles High", were "the first example[s] of pop songs that were specifically conceived as vehicles for extended [Indian] modal improvisation." Upon the release of "Eight Miles High" and "Why", Indian-influenced, modal improvisation became open territory in rock music and the Byrds found themselves at the forefront of the burgeoning psychedelic and raga rock movements.

In 1967 "Why" was covered by the British psychedelic band Tomorrow, but their version of the song was not released until its inclusion on the 1998 compilation album 50 Minute Technicolor Dream. The song was also recorded as part of a medley with another Byrds' song, "Time Between", by the Mock Turtles for the 1989 Byrds' tribute album, Time Between – A Tribute to The Byrds.
