= Raga rock =

Microgenre of rock music

- Stylistic origins: Rock; raga; pop; Indian music
- Cultural origins: Mid-1960s, United Kingdom and United States
- Derivative forms: Indian rock; psychedelic rock; Sufi rock

Raga rock is rock or pop music with a pronounced Indian influence, either in its construction, its timbre, or its use of Indian musical instruments, such as the sitar, tambura, and tabla. The term "raga" refers to the specific melodic modes used in Indian classical music.

The style emerged as part of the psychedelic rock aesthetic in the 1960s. Most raga rock recordings originate from that decade, although there are subsequent examples of Indian-derived sounds in rock and pop music, particularly during the 1990s.

== Development ==
=== Definition ===
Ragas are specific melodic modes used in the classical music of the Indian subcontinent. The term "raga rock" originated in March 1966 as a description of rock music that featured Indian sitar styling. According to musicologist Jonathan Bellman, citing Lillian Roxon's 1969 book Rock Encyclopedia: "This catchphrase eventually came to describe any Rock song that evoked an Indian or general Oriental mood, whether by use of sitar or another instrument imitating it." Music journalist Rob Chapman says the phrase was a "catch-all term" and "something of a misnomer", since it was often applied to any piece of rock music that "used non-European instrumentation or music styles to denote its exotic qualities".

A major influence on raga rock was the music of Bengali sitarist Ravi Shankar. He himself became a pop music icon in 1966, following the rise of the raga rock trend. Rock's use of elements from the Indian classical tradition included:

- sitar (usually serving the role of an electric guitar)
- drone, provided by tambura in raga performances and by Indian harmonium in vocal pieces
- modal melodies based on Indian scales
- vocal stylings
- additive, rather than divisive, rhythms (tal)
- question-and-answer interplay (jawab-sawal) between lead instruments
- lead instruments mirroring the vocal line
- lyrical themes related to mysticism or religious symbolism.

Don Snowden of The Los Angeles Times acknowledges the 1960s raga rock movement, as well as Santana's mix of blues rock and Afro-Cuban percussion later in the decade, as parts of a broader phenomenon that would come to be known as worldbeat in the 1980s.

=== Antecedents ===
Writing for Crawdaddy! in December 1966, Sandy Pearlman traced the origins of raga rock to folk music, specifically the drone-producing guitar tunings which American folk musician Sandy Bull had been incorporating into his music since 1963. More recently, Chapman and author John Schaefer have both noted that English folk guitarist Davey Graham's raga-tinged arrangement of the Irish ballad "She Moved Through the Fair", from 1963's From a London Hootenanny EP, predated the raga rock experimentation of 1960s rock groups by two years.

== 1960s ==
=== Early examples ===
Music researcher William Echard states that "Heart Full of Soul" by the Yardbirds, which was released in June 1965, "is frequently cited as a key text in starting the trend" towards incorporating Indian-inspired elements in rock music. An Indian sitarist and a tabla player accompanied the Yardbirds on a demo recording of the song, but only the tabla part was deemed usable. Instead, Jeff Beck emulated the sitar figure, tone and accompanying drone on the electric guitar for the master recording. The song reached number 2 on the UK chart and number 9 in the US.

According to Rob Chapman, the other record "chiefly credited with introducing raga motifs into Western pop" is the Kinks' July 1965 single "See My Friends", which was another top-ten hit in the UK. Written by Ray Davies and inspired by a visit to India, the song used open-tuned guitars to imitate the drone produced by an Indian tambura. Davies' vocal affectations added to the track's Indian quality; in author Peter Lavezzoli's description, "See My Friends" was "the first pop song to evoke an Indian feel". Before either of these examples, the Beatles' April 1965 single "Ticket to Ride", which was number 1 in many countries around the world, featured a melody that author Ian MacDonald terms "raga-like" over a subtle Indian drone produced by electric guitars.

While "Heart Full of Soul" and "See My Friends" were both influential on the emerging trend, according to author Jon Savage, "the first truly mass exposure" was through the Beatles' 1965 film Help!, which included incidental music played by Indian session musicians. (Note: The film's focus on Kali and other Hindu themes anticipated the counterculture's fascination with Indian philosophy and music. These aspects were nevertheless portrayed in a largely negative and stereotypical way by director Richard Lester.) Writing in 1997, Jonathan Bellman commented that the Yardbirds and Kinks recordings were often overlooked in discussions of raga rock's origins, as history instead highlighted the Beatles' "Norwegian Wood (This Bird Has Flown)". Issued in December 1965 on the band's Rubber Soul album, the folk-styled "Norwegian Wood" was the first Western pop song to incorporate the sitar, which was played by lead guitarist George Harrison, and the first to feature Indian instrumentation played by a rock musician. The song's popularity inspired a wave of interest in the sitar and Indian sounds, a phenomenon that Shankar later called "the great sitar explosion". According to authors Nicholas Schaffner and Bernard Gendron, raga rock was inaugurated by the release of "Norwegian Wood". (Note: Writing in 1988, musicologist Gerry Farrell said the recognition afforded the Beatles for changes in the musical landscape during the 1960s was because their popularity and influence was such that they represented "a kind of spirit-level of pop music". He also wrote: "Attempts at fusions with Indian music, especially with jazz, go back to the late fifties but it took the Beatles and a media which had a seemingly insatiable hunger for all that band's activities to catapult Indian music to the forefront of public awareness and, briefly, makes the sitār a common feature of popular culture in the West.")

=== The Byrds' raga-rock press conference ===
The Byrds hosting their "raga rock" press conference for the release of "Eight Miles High" in March 1966

The Byrds' March 1966 single "Eight Miles High" and its B-side, "Why", were also influential in originating the subgenre. Whereas earlier recordings by the Kinks, the Yardbirds and the Beatles had used Indian sounds to complement standard song forms, the Byrds incorporated the improvisational technique typical of Shankar's work and of John Coltrane's jazz interpretations of ragas. In his 1968 Pop Chronicles interview, however, Byrds guitarist Roger McGuinn denied that "Eight Miles High" was raga rock; co-writer David Crosby also dismissed the term. While many listeners assumed that the lead instrument on these and other songs on the Byrds' Fifth Dimension album was a sitar, McGuinn in fact played a Rickenbacker 12-string electric guitar throughout, and had customised his guitar amplifier to achieve the sitar-like sound.

It's rock 'n' roll, it's neither jazz nor Indian music. But we listen to their music and we like it and it influences our minds and our playing ... Rock is going to keep growing. It has in it now African, South American, jazz, folk, church, Bach, Indian, Greek, country, bluegrass.

— David Crosby discussing the Byrds' raga rock sound in 1966, although he later rejected the term

The term "raga rock" was coined by the Byrds' publicist in press releases for "Eight Miles High" and was first used in print by Sally Kempton of The Village Voice in her report of the band's press conference for the single's release. The press conference was organised by former Beatles publicist Derek Taylor and took place in New York on 28 March, with a sitar symbolically placed in front of the table where the Byrds sat. Kempton wrote dismissively of the event, during which McGuinn and Crosby spoke earnestly of the group's adoption of Indian influences, with the two musicians demonstrating raga techniques on sitar and acoustic guitar, respectively, while their two bandmates appeared bored and instead read magazines. Kempton said that the message was lost on those attending the press conference, namely female reporters from teen magazines and conservative-looking representatives from the music industry.

Hit Parader reported on the Byrds demonstrating how "sitar-like sounds" could be played on guitar by tuning the standard E strings down to D; this allowed the guitarist to play in partial open tuning, whereby "the bottom three strings provide the drone sound and the upper strings are bent to play the melody." The term "raga rock" was soon adopted by British music publications such as the New Musical Express and Music Echo, and an early discussion of raga rock appeared in Melody Maker in April. According to Gendron, however, the fusion of Indian and Western sounds continued to be treated with disdain by writers from the American cultural press, who viewed the new subgenre as part of the consolidation of folk rock.

=== Peak popularity and impact ===
In May 1966, the Rolling Stones released the raga rock single "Paint It Black", which featured a sitar part played by guitarist Brian Jones and became an international number 1 hit. According to author Mark Brend, the song "spawned a whole subgenre of minor-key psychedelia". The Hollies' song "Bus Stop", released as a single in June, was another example of the style's growing popularity. William Echard identifies the song's sitar-like guitar solo as both an authentic indicator of raga rock and a device seemingly aimed at exploiting the trend.

Along with "Eight Miles High", Echard highlights the Beatles' Revolver album among the "landmark" raga rock music issued in 1966. Released in August, it included both "Love You To", written by George Harrison especially for sitar and tabla interplay, and "Tomorrow Never Knows", written by John Lennon, which featured heavy tambura drone, tape loops and psychedelic instrumentation. (Note: Echard cites "Tomorrow Never Knows" as an example of raga rock "rubb[ing] shoulders with the classical avant-garde".) The album represented pop music's most overt incorporation of Indian instruments, musical form and philosophy up to that point, with the influence also evident in the use of vocal melisma and in the Indian-inspired guitar solos on "Taxman" and "I'm Only Sleeping".

That same month, the Paul Butterfield Blues Band released the album East-West, the title track of which (originally titled "The Raga") had evolved from their live performances since February. Led by guitarist Mike Bloomfield, the 13-minute instrumental fully explored the modal improvisation introduced by McGuinn on "Eight Miles High". Bloomfield likened the Indian drone to "the sound a bee makes: a steady hum" and said that while the pattern was essentially simple, the "challenge" was in "improvis[ing] a free melody around the one basic drone". In Lavezzoli's view, Bloomfield's playing on "East-West" "opened the door to unlimited freedom of expression for all rock guitarists, from Eric Clapton and Jerry Garcia to Duane Allman and Jimi Hendrix".

During the height of the subgenre's popularity that year, Indian musicians also contributed to its development. Released on the World Pacific record label in June, the Folkswingers' Raga Rock album featured Harihar Rao, a Los Angeles-based sitarist and ethnomusicologist, accompanied by jazz musicians and members of the Wrecking Crew. (Note: Raga Rock included cover versions of "Norwegian Wood", "Paint It Black", "Eight Miles High" and the Yardbirds' "Shapes of Things", among other contemporary rock songs. Rao was a longstanding associate of Shankar and briefly taught Brian Jones the sitar.) A September 1966 issue of Life magazine reported on the growth of the raga rock trend in association with the proliferation of psychedelic-themed shops in San Francisco and New York. Acts such as Donovan, the Moody Blues, the Doors, the Pretty Things and Traffic also recorded in the raga rock style. Having been accepted as a student by Shankar in June 1966, Harrison travelled to India for intensive sitar study in September. Harrison's championing of Indian culture further popularised the trend among Western musicians and, in Schaffner's description, earned him the sobriquet "the maharaja of raga-rock". While many musicians at this time adopted the sitar as a fad, he, Jones, Shawn Phillips (Donovan's guitarist) and session player Big Jim Sullivan were among the London-based guitarists who approached the instrument with a serious interest and shared their ideas.

In his article for Crawdaddy!, Pearlman identified two categories of contemporary raga rock songs: those that merely adopted Indian sounds as an exotic feature, such as "Norwegian Wood", "Paint It Black" and Donovan's Sunshine Superman track "Three King Fishers"; and recordings that incorporated aspects of Indian music in their compositional form, such as "Eight Miles High" and Donovan's "The Trip". Davies' second raga rock song with the Kinks, "Fancy", from 1966's Face to Face album, again used chord changes minimally, but sufficient to keep the composition identifiable as Western pop. By contrast, Harrison adhered to the authentically Indian, single-chord form in "Love You To" and "Within You Without You", the latter released on Sgt. Pepper's Lonely Hearts Club Band in June 1967, and both songs were arranged in a Hindustani classical structure, with distinct alap, gat and drut gat sections. (Note: Pearlman nevertheless categorised "Love You To" among the songs in which an Indian influence was more decorative than an intrinsic part of the composition.) He also incorporated a wide range of Indian instrumentation by 1967, with sitar, tambura, tabla, dilruba and swarmandal, and later on, sarod, shehnai, bansuri and pakhavaj. Another foray into raga rock on Sgt. Pepper, John Lennon's "Lucy in the Sky with Diamonds" included tambura drone and a guitar part in which Harrison, playing in unison with Lennon's vocal, imitated the role of a sarangi player accompanying a khyal singer. (Note: During this period, the Beatles also recorded two Indian-inspired songs that Harrison performed on Hammond organ – "It's All Too Much" and "Blue Jay Way" – using the instrument to achieve a harmonised drone. In addition to borrowing from the Hindustani ragas Kosalam and Multani, "Blue Jay Way" featured a cello part played in the style of a sitar.)

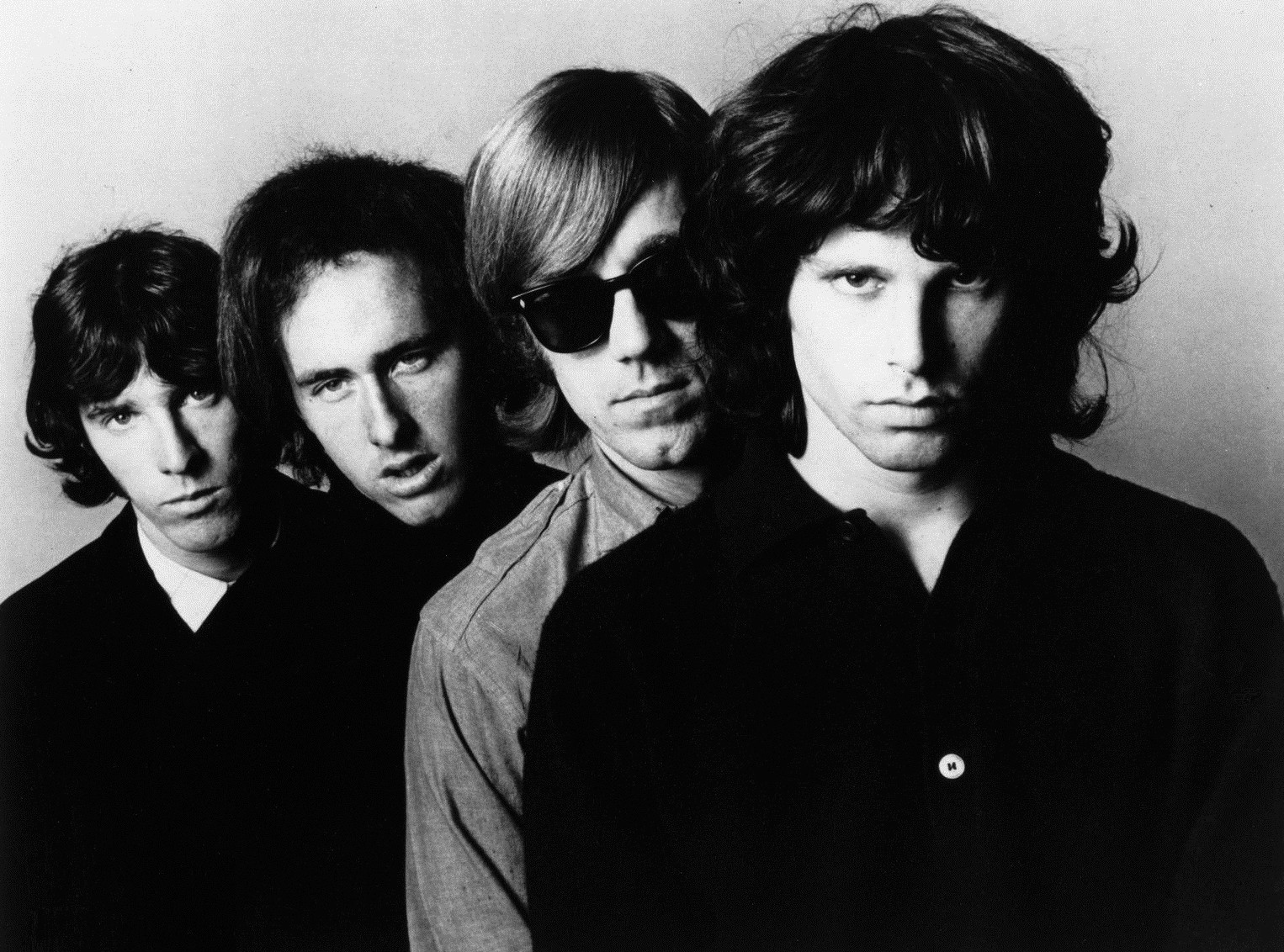
The Doors in late 1966, a few months after recording the lengthy track "The End".

One of Crosby's final songs with the Byrds, "Mind Gardens", from the 1967 album Younger Than Yesterday, incorporated drone and raga rock ambience, and vocals evoking the khyal tradition in style and ornamentation. The Doors closed their self-titled 1967 album with "The End", an 11-minute piece in the raga rock style. In Lavezzoli's description, guitarist Robby Krieger successfully conveyed "the brooding quality of the darker ragas" in his contribution to "The End", by first creating a drone on plucked open-tuned strings while also playing a motif in the manner of a sitar or veena, and then, towards the climax of the song, adopting the Indian jhala style, with rapid strumming alternating with the melody line. Lavezzoli writes that sitar sounds were becoming a "fixture in pop music" in 1967, with Dave Mason contributing sitar parts to Traffic's first two hit singles, "Paper Sun" and "Hole in My Shoe". Other acts used a Coral electric sitar, designed by American guitarist Vinnie Bell and manufactured by the Danelectro guitar company. Bell's 1967 album Pop Goes the Electric Sitar added to the collection of what Brend terms "sitarploitation" LPs – containing raga rock-style cover versions of well-known pop songs – a phenomenon that, inaugurated by Rao's Raga Rock, also included Sitar Beat and Lord Sitar by Big Jim Sullivan.

=== Consolidation and decline ===
Further examples of the subgenre in 1968 were the Rolling Stones' "Street Fighting Man", with its use of tambura and shehnai over distorted acoustic rhythm guitars, and Harrison's final Indian-style composition for the Beatles, "The Inner Light", which he recorded in January with Indian classical musicians in Bombay. (Note: Harrison continued to draw inspiration as a songwriter from Indian music, however, particularly following the Beatles' break-up in 1970. Lavezzoli describes his slide guitar approach as "unique" and highlights Harrison's evocation of an Indian sarod or veena in the instrumental "Marwa Blues", his Hawaiian-influenced adaptation of Raga Marwa.) These Bombay sessions also yielded part of Harrison's first solo album, a raga rock soundtrack to the 1968 film Wonderwall, titled Wonderwall Music. Music journalist Chris Ingham has noted Wonderwall Music's influence on the later raga rock sound of 1990s indie band Kula Shaker. In addition to using Indian elements in their single "Dark Star", Garcia's band the Grateful Dead incorporated raga rock, among several other styles, into the extended jams they performed in concert in 1968.

According to Echard, the raga rock trend was largely over by early 1968, having declined late the previous year. In Bellman's opinion, the musical exploration evident in raga rock over 1965–67 was largely replaced by a formulaic approach in 1968. He cited the Moody Blues' July 1968 release In Search of the Lost Chord as a work that combined the now-familiar sounds of sitar and tabla with an album-wide concept that reinforced the perceived connection between LSD and Transcendental Meditation (TM), following the Beatles' and Donovan's public endorsement of TM guru Maharishi Mahesh Yogi.

== 1970s and beyond ==
From 1969 and through the early 1970s, the British progressive rock band Quintessence mixed elements of Indian classical music with rock and jazz. Ananda Shankar (a nephew of Ravi Shankar) released his self-titled album in 1970, a raga rock work that blended sitar with Moog synthesizer. Later in the decade, guitarist John McLaughlin and his band Shakti introduced a jazz-influenced version of raga rock over the course of three albums.

In the 1990s, the British indie rock group Cornershop began to assimilate Asian instruments such as the sitar and dholki into their music, culminating with their 1997 album When I Was Born for the 7th Time. The album, which fused Indian music with rock, funk, hip hop and country music, featured the UK number 1 single "Brimful of Asha" (itself a tribute to Indian singer Asha Bhosle) and a cover of the Beatles' "Norwegian Wood" sung entirely in Punjabi. In 1996, the British rock group Kula Shaker had top 10 raga rock hits with "Tattva" and "Govinda", both of which included Sanskrit lyrics. The band continued to introduce raga rock material into their repertoire, including "Song of Love/Narayana", which lead singer Crispian Mills had also sung on the Prodigy's 1997 album The Fat of the Land. The Brian Jonestown Massacre released the albums Their Satanic Majesties' Second Request in 1996 and Give It Back! in 1997, both of which contained Indian and psychedelic rock influences.

Recently, a revival of sorts has been heralded by Western bands such as the Black Angels and the Brian Jonestown Massacre and Indian bands such as the Raghu Dixit Project, Agam and Swarathma, with an increasing blend of Western instruments with the traditional Indian ones – the flute and the sitar.

== Lyrical themes and Orientalism ==
Some scholars approach raga rock and other uses of non-Western musical materials in Western popular music from sociological perspectives, especially as a manifestation of Orientalism. Common lyrical themes include drug use, sexual exploration, and spirituality.

"Eight Miles High" was the subject of radio bans in the United States due to its interpretation as an LSD song in which "high" referred to drug-induced euphoria. "Love You To" reflected countercultural ideology and, according to music critic Kenneth Womack, advocated hedonistic and carnal pursuits, while Lennon's lyrics in "Tomorrow Never Knows" were taken from the book The Psychedelic Experience: A Manual Based on the Tibetan Book of the Dead by Timothy Leary, Richard Alpert and Ralph Metzner. Partly under Shankar's guidance, Harrison channelled the teachings of the Hindu Vedas into his lyrics for "Within You Without You", providing a message that also served as the ethos behind the 1967 Summer of Love. Bellman writes that "the Kinks' use of eastern musical influences to allude to personal and sexual matters is directly in keeping with historical uses of exoticism as signifier for forbidden sexuality." Bellman and other scholars suggest that, through raga rock, the Orient once again becomes a Western fantasy land, mediated to mass culture audiences of the mid- and late twentieth century through rock and roll.

== See also ==
- Indo jazz
- Psychedelic music
- Sitar in popular music
- Ten Ragas to a Disco Beat

== Sources ==
- Bellman, Jonathan (1998). The Exotic in Western Music. Lebanon, New Hampshire: UPNE. ISBN 1-55553-319-1.
- Brend, Mark (2005). Strange Sounds: Offbeat Instruments and Sonic Experiments in Pop. San Francisco, CA: Backbeat Books. ISBN 978-0-879308551.
- Chapman, Rob (2015). Psychedelia and Other Colours. London: Faber & Faber. ISBN 978-0-571-28200-5.
- Echard, William (2017). Psychedelic Popular Music: A History through Musical Topic Theory. Bloomington, Indiana: Indiana University Press. ISBN 978-0253026590.
- Everett, Walter (1999). The Beatles as Musicians: Revolver Through the Anthology. New York: Oxford University Press. ISBN 978-0-19-512941-0.
- Farrell, Gerry (May 1988). "Reflecting Surfaces: The Use of Elements of Indian Music in Popular Music and Jazz". Popular Music. 7 (2): 189–205. doi:10.1017/S0261143000002750. S2CID 194102429.
- Gendron, Bernard (2002). Between Montmartre and the Mudd Club: Popular Music and the Avant-Garde. Chicago, IL: University of Chicago Press. ISBN 978-0-226-28737-9.
- Hjort, Christopher (2008). So You Want to Be a Rock 'n' Roll Star: The Byrds Day-By-Day (1965–1973). London: Jawbone Press. ISBN 978-1-906002-15-2.
- Jackson, Andrew Grant (2015). 1965: The Most Revolutionary Year in Music. New York: Thomas Dunne Books. ISBN 978-1-250-05962-8.
- Lavezzoli, Peter (2006). The Dawn of Indian Music in the West. New York: Continuum. ISBN 0-8264-2819-3.
- Locke, Ralph P. (2011) [2009]. Musical Exoticism: Images and Reflections. Cambridge, UK: Cambridge University Press. ISBN 978-0-521-34955-0.
- MacDonald, Ian (2005). Revolution in the Head: The Beatles' Records and the Sixties. London: Pimlico. ISBN 1-84413-828-3.
- di Perna, Alan (2012). Guitar Masters: Intimate Portraits. Hal Leonard. ISBN 978-1-4803-2970-6.
- Philo, Simon (2015). British Invasion: The Crosscurrents of Musical Influence. Lanham, MD: Rowman & Littlefield. ISBN 978-0-8108-8626-1.
- Prendergast, Mark (2003). The Ambient Century: From Mahler to Moby – The Evolution of Sound in the Electronic Age. New York: Bloomsbury. ISBN 1-58234-323-3.
- Priore, Domenic (2007). Riot on Sunset Strip: Rock'n'Roll's Last Stand in Hollywood. London: Jawbone Press. ISBN 978-1-906002-04-6.
- Reck, David B. (2009). "India/South India". In Titon, Jeff Todd (ed.). Worlds of Music: An Introduction to the Music of the World's Peoples (5th edn). Belmont, CA: Schirmer Cengage Learning. ISBN 978-0-534-59539-5.
- Rogan, Johnny (1998). The Byrds: Timeless Flight Revisited. Rogan House. ISBN 0-9529540-1-X.
- Santoro, Gene (1991). Beckology (Boxed set booklet). Jeff Beck. New York City: Epic Records/Legacy Recordings. OCLC 144959074. 48661.
- Savage, Jon (2015). 1966: The Year the Decade Exploded. London: Faber & Faber. ISBN 978-0-571-27763-6.
- Schaffner, Nicholas (1978). The Beatles Forever. New York, NY: McGraw-Hill. ISBN 0-07-055087-5.
- Schaffner, Nicholas (1982). The British Invasion: From the First Wave to the New Wave. New York: McGraw-Hill. ISBN 0-07-055089-1.
- Womack, Kenneth (2007). Long and Winding Roads: The Evolving Artistry of the Beatles. New York: Continuum. ISBN 978-0-8264-1746-6.
