= Raga Rock (album) =

Studio album by the Folkswingers featuring Harihar Rao
- Released: June 10, 1966
- Studio: World Pacific, Los Angeles
- Genre: Raga rock
- Length: 29:54
- Label: World Pacific
- Producer: Richard Bock

Raga Rock is an album credited to "the Folkswingers featuring Harihar Rao", who was a Los Angeles-based Indian classical musician and ethnomusicologist. The album was released in June 1966 on the World Pacific record label. The title refers to the raga rock trend in popular music, as artists such as the Beatles, the Byrds, the Rolling Stones and the Yardbirds had all begun incorporating Indian influences into their recent work. Led by the sitar playing of Rao, a longtime associate of Ravi Shankar, the album contains instrumental versions of several of these contemporary songs, including "Norwegian Wood", "Eight Miles High" and "Paint It Black". Other members of the Folkswingers for this release included jazz musicians such as Herb Ellis and Dennis Budimir, and members of the Los Angeles pool of session musicians known as the Wrecking Crew.

While it was intended to capitalize on the raga rock trend, the album also furthered the scope of the subgenre. It was followed by a series of similar albums in which contemporary pop songs were arranged for sitar, including releases by Lord Sitar and Ananda Shankar. Raga Rock was reissued on CD in 2007 by Fallout Records.

== Background and recording ==
The Raga Rock project resurrected the "Folkswingers" moniker, which was an artist credit used by World Pacific Records for its themed albums containing instrumental versions of popular songs. The name was first used in 1963 for 12 String Guitar!, an album of folk songs recorded by guitarist Glen Campbell and members of the Dillards. This LP and its 1964 sequel were produced by Jim Dickson, later the Byrds' mentor and manager. In 1966, with pop acts such as the Beatles, the Byrds and the Rolling Stones incorporating Indian musical influences into their work, resulting in the rise of the raga rock phenomenon, World Pacific decided to create a Folkswingers album dedicated to the new trend. The featured performer, on sitar, was Harihar Rao, who was director of Indian studies at UCLA's Department of Ethnomusicology, and a pioneer in fusing Indian music and jazz through his work with Don Ellis in the Hindustani Jazz Sextet. In addition to being a protégé of Ravi Shankar since the late 1940s, Rao had recently taught Brian Jones the fundamentals of sitar playing before Jones recorded his sitar part for the Rolling Stones' raga-rock hit "Paint It Black".

The Folkswingers' ensemble included jazz guitarists Herb Ellis and Dennis Budimir, the last of whom, like Rao and producer Richard Bock, had collaborated on Shankar's Indo-jazz projects such as Improvisations. The other contributors to Raga Rock were session musicians Tommy Tedesco, Howard Roberts, Larry Knechtel, Bill Pitman, Lyle Ritz and Hal Blaine, who were all members of the Los Angeles Wrecking Crew. Rao's sitar was the only non-Western instrument used on the album.

The songs recorded by the ensemble included the Beatles' "Norwegian Wood (This Bird Has Flown)" and the Byrds' "Eight Miles High" – each of which has been recognised as representing the start of raga rock – and "Paint It Black", which the Rolling Stones issued as a single in early May. (Note: The term "raga rock" was first used in conjunction with the March 1966 release of the "Eight Miles High" single, and the Byrds are viewed as the initiators of the subgenre. However, given that it was later defined as any rock or pop music with an obvious Indian influence, the inclusion of sitar on "Norwegian Wood" (which was released in December 1965) has led to that song being cited as the birth of raga rock.) Among the other tracks were recent songs by the Yardbirds ("Shapes of Things"), Simon & Garfunkel ("Homeward Bound"), the Turtles ("Grim Reaper of Love") and Paul Revere & the Raiders ("Kicks"). The sole original composition, "Raga Rock", was credited to George Tipton, the project's musical arranger.

== Release and legacy ==
World Pacific released Raga Rock on June 10, 1966 with the catalog number WPS-1846. The album's liner notes were supplied by KHJ disc jockey Don Steele, who wrote: "Here it is at last, the first popular LP to really feature the sound of the sitar." In his review for the Los Angeles Times, Pete Johnson said of Raga Rock: "Hardly ethnomusicology material, but it all swings and the album is one of those rare records in which material of other groups is treated in an original way." High Fidelity's reviewer found the mix of Rao's sitar with guitar, organ and a jazz rhythm section "an interesting novelty" but said that the material did not allow the combination's potential to be fully realized.

Raga Rock was followed by other albums on which Indian-influenced pop and rock songs were given a more obvious Indian treatment. Author Mark Brend terms them "sitarploitation" records, of which the Folkswingers release was "the first and best". Among these albums were releases by Lord Sitar (Big Jim Sullivan), Rajput and the Sepoy Mutiny, and the Nirvana Sitar and String Group. Larry Knechtel and other members of the Wrecking Crew also recorded another Indian-themed LP, Tanyet, under the pseudonym "the Ceyleib People". According to Time Out music journalist John Lewis, the most artistically successful of all the "sitar rock" projects, including Rao's, was one by Ravi Shankar's nephew, Ananda Shankar, whose self-titled 1970 album combined East–West musical influences on Moog synthesizer and sitar. (Note: The Ananda Shankar LP included interpretations of the Rolling Stones' "Jumpin' Jack Flash" and the Doors' "Light My Fire". Shankar said that his album was initially planned as a collaboration with Jimi Hendrix.)

Rao and the Folkswingers' album was reissued on CD in 2007 by Fallout Records. In his review for AllMusic, Richie Unterberger admires the level of musicianship on Raga Rock but adds: "It still sounds like what it is: a hastily recorded cash-in album … Overall, the LP couldn't help but sound like a novelty record, albeit one with a much higher level of instrumental proficiency than the usual such project."

== Track listing ==
Side one

1. "Paint It, Black" (Mick Jagger, Keith Richard) – 2:37
2. "Eight Miles High" (Gene Clark, Roger McGuinn, David Crosby) – 2:55
3. "Dona, Dona" (Sholom Secunda, Aaron Zeitlin) – 2:11
4. "Norwegian Wood (This Bird Has Flown)" (John Lennon, Paul McCartney) – 2:08
5. "Along Comes Mary" (Tandyn Almer) – 2:47
6. "Time Won't Let Me" (Tom King, Chet Kelley) – 2:17

Side two

1. "Shapes of Things" (Jim McCarty, Keith Relf, Paul Samwell-Smith) – 2:21
2. "Hey Joe" (Dino Valenti) – 2:45
3. "Kicks" (Barry Mann, Cynthia Weil) – 2:25
4. "Homeward Bound" (Paul Simon) – 2:42
5. "Grim Reaper of Love" (Al Nichol, Chuck Portz) – 2:25
6. "Raga Rock" (George Tipton) – 2:29

== Personnel ==
According to the 2007 CD credits:

- Harihar Rao – sitar
- Dennis Budimir – electric 12-string guitar
- Tommy Tedesco – guitar
- Howard Roberts – guitar
- Herb Ellis – guitar
- Larry Knechtel – organ, electric piano
- Bill Pitman – bass
- Lyle Ritz – electric bass
- Hal Blaine – drums
- George Tipton – musical arrangements

== Sources ==
- Bellman, Jonathan (Winter 1997). "Indian Resonances in the British Invasion, 1965–1968". The Journal of Musicology. 15 (1). Oakland, CA: University of California Press: 116–36. doi:10.2307/763906. JSTOR 763906.
- Brend, Mark (2005). Strange Sounds: Offbeat Instruments and Sonic Experiments in Pop. San Francisco, CA: Backbeat Books. ISBN 978-0-879308551.
- DeCurtis, Anthony; Henke, James; George-Warren, Holly, eds. (1992). The Rolling Stone Illustrated History of Rock and Roll: The Definitive History of the Most Important Artists and Their Music. New York, NY: Straight Arrow. ISBN 978-0679737285.
- Dimery, Robert, ed. (2011). 1001 Albums You Must Hear Before You Die: Revised and Updated Edition. New York, NY: Quintessence. ISBN 978-0-7893-1371-3.
- Hjort, Christopher (2008). So You Want to Be a Rock 'n' Roll Star: The Byrds Day-By-Day (1965–1973). London: Jawbone Press. ISBN 978-1-906002-15-2.
- Lavezzoli, Peter (2006). The Dawn of Indian Music in the West. New York, NY: Continuum. ISBN 0-8264-2819-3.
- Shankar, Ravi (1999). Raga Mala: The Autobiography of Ravi Shankar. New York, NY: Welcome Rain. ISBN 1-56649-104-5.
- World Music: The Rough Guide (Volume 2: Latin and North America, Caribbean, India, Asia and Pacific). London: Rough Guides/Penguin. 2000. ISBN 1-85828-636-0.
