= Where the Girls Are (TV program) =

- Starring: Noel Harrison; Don Adams; Cher; The Association; The Byrds; Barbara McNair; Professor Irwin Corey
- Country of origin: United States
- Original language: English

Production
- Camera setup: Multiple
- Running time: 58 minutes

Original release
- Network: NBC
- Release: April 23, 1968

Where the Girls Are is a music and comedy special that aired on NBC in 1968.

Noel Harrison, fresh from his role in the NBC series Girl From U.N.C.L.E., hosted the hour-long special. Comic skits were performed by Professor Irwin Corey and Don Adams, who was starring in the NBC series Get Smart.

Musical numbers were performed by The Association, Barbara McNair, Cher and The Byrds. The "Close-Up" for the program in the April 20–26, 1968 TV Guide also notes: "The goings-on include antic camerawork and a bevy of mini-clad beauties."

Celanese Arnel was a major sponsor.

The special was broadcast on Tuesday, April 23, 1968. It pre-empted The Jerry Lewis Show on NBC's network schedule.

== Musical numbers ==
Title	Performer
"The Pied Piper"	Noel Harrison
"Flash, Bang, Wallop!"	Noel Harrison
"Where the Girls Are"	Noel Harrison
"Hello, Good-by"	Noel Harrison
"Gentle on My Mind"	Noel Harrison
"Windy"	The Association
"Everything that Touches You"	The Association
"Mr. Spaceman"	The Byrds
"Sunny"	Cher
"Don't Rain on My Parade"	Barbara McNair
"Brush Up Your Shakespeare"	Noel Harrison, Don Adams
"Let's Not"	Noel Harrison, Cher
