= Mr. Spaceman =

- West German picture sleeve

Single by the Byrds

from the album Fifth Dimension
- B-side: "What's Happening?!?!"
- Released: September 6, 1966
- Recorded: April 28–29 and May 3–6, 1966
- Studio: Columbia, Hollywood, CA
- Genre: Psychedelic rock, country rock
- Length: 2:09
- Label: Columbia
- Songwriter: Jim McGuinn
- Producer: Allen Stanton

The Byrds singles chronology
"5D (Fifth Dimension)" (1966)	"Mr. Spaceman" (1966)	"So You Want to Be a Rock 'n' Roll Star" (1967)

"Mr. Spaceman" is a song by the American rock band the Byrds and was the third track on their 1966 album, Fifth Dimension. It was released as the third single from the album in September 1966, reaching number 36 on the Billboard Hot 100, but failing to chart in the United Kingdom. Upon its release as a single, the music press coined the term "space-rock" to describe it, although since then, this term has come to refer to a genre of rock music originating from 1970s progressive and psychedelic music.

== Composition and release ==
Written in early 1966 by Byrds member Jim McGuinn, the song was—along with "5D (Fifth Dimension)"—one of two science fiction-themed songs on the Fifth Dimension album. Initially conceived as a "melodramatic screenplay", the song soon evolved into a whimsical meditation on the existence of extraterrestrial life.

Musically, "Mr. Spaceman" has a country-style backing, albeit with touches of psychedelia, and can clearly be seen as a precursor to the band's later exploration of country music on Sweetheart of the Rodeo. As such, the song has been cited by critics as one of the earliest examples of country rock. The title also recalled that of the Byrds' earlier worldwide smash hit and debut single, "Mr. Tambourine Man".

The single release of the song was accompanied by a spoof press announcement from the Byrds' co-manager, Eddie Tickner, stating that he had taken out a $1,000,000 insurance policy with Lloyd's of London against his clients being kidnapped by extraterrestrial visitors. Despite Tickner's statement being an obvious publicity stunt and the deliberately tongue-in-cheek nature of the song's lyrics, both McGuinn and fellow band member David Crosby felt hopeful about communicating with alien life forms through the medium of AM radio broadcast. In a later interview with Pete Frame for ZigZag magazine, McGuinn explained how he believed that this would have been possible: "I was interested in astronomy and the possibility of connecting with extraterrestrial life and I thought that it might work the other way round, if we tried to contact them. I thought that the song being played on the air might be a way of getting through to them. But even if there had been anybody up there listening, they wouldn't have heard because I found out later that AM airwaves diffuse in space too rapidly."

Billboard magazine described the song as "off-beat rhythm material with clever lyrics". Cash Box said that it is "a quick moving, infectious, happy-go-lucky ditty with the UFO scene as its theme," and which it expected would be a hit. Record World said it is "cute and singalongable" with a "bouncy, jaunty melody."

== Post-release ==
During the late 1960s and early 1970s, the Byrds performed the song on the television programs The Smothers Brothers Comedy Hour, Where the Girls Are, and The David Frost Show among others. Additionally, the song would go on to become a staple of the Byrds' live concert repertoire, until their final disbandment in 1973. The song was also performed live by a reformed lineup of the Byrds featuring McGuinn, Crosby, and Chris Hillman in January 1989.

In addition to its appearance on the Fifth Dimension album, "Mr. Spaceman" also appears on several Byrds' compilations, including The Byrds' Greatest Hits, History of The Byrds, The Original Singles: 1965–1967, Volume 1, The Byrds, The Very Best of The Byrds, The Essential Byrds, and There Is a Season. Live performances of the song are included on the live portion of the Byrds' (Untitled) album as well as on Live at Royal Albert Hall 1971.

"Mr. Spaceman" was broadcast as a wake-up call to the astronauts aboard the NASA Space Shuttle mission STS-41-D (the first mission of Space Shuttle Discovery) on September 2, 1984.

== Cover versions ==
"Mr. Spaceman" has been covered by a number of artists, including the Flying Burrito Brothers on their 1985 live album, Cabin Fever, Velvet Crush on their 2001 compilation album, A Single Odessey, Limbeck on their 2006 Tour EP, and Miracle Legion on the Byrds' tribute album, Time Between – A Tribute to The Byrds, In 1994, Jimmy Buffett, Gonzo, and Rizzo the Rat covered "Mr. Spaceman" on The Muppets' album Kermit Unpigged.

The song was also covered by Colombian rock band Los Speakers, as the opening track of their 1967 album Tuercas, Tornillos y Alicates. The lyrics in this version are not the original ones, but rather a Spanish adaptation of them.

"Mr. Spaceman" is also one of the songs featured in the Jukebox musical, Return to the Forbidden Planet.
