= Zhang Xingte =

Chinese singer

- 张星特
- Born: Zhang Xingte; February 11, 2003 (age 23); Kunming, Yunnan, China
- Occupations: Singer, actor, songwriter
- Years active: 2016–present
- Agent(s): Beijing Zhongshi Mingda Culture & Media Co., Ltd. Weili Culture
- Known for: Chuang 2021
- Notable work: Music: "Youthful Joy" (年少的欢喜) "Part" (部分) "Dawang Park" (大望公园) "Romantic Branch Store" (浪漫分店) "Her Story" (关于她的事) Variety Shows: "CHUANG 2021" (创造营2021)
- Website: Zhang Xingte on Weibo

Zhang Xingte (born February 11, 2003) is a male singer from Wenzhou, Zhejiang Province, born in Kunming, Yunnan Province, China. He is signed under the agency Weili Culture. On February 17, 2021, he participated in the idol survival show "CHUANG 2021" on Tencent Video.

Zhang Xingte's official fan name is "Te Xiao Yao" (Tete's Laughing Medicine), and his personal fan support colors are "Galaxy Ocean"

== Experience ==
In 2018, he released his first solo single "The Wild Goose Flying South". In 2019, he released singles such as "Starlight" and "Direction". In 2020, he released original singles like "Stay" (挽留) .

On September 4, 2020, he participated as a special guest in the autumn limited joint tour "We Wrote a Love Poem for You" with the sweet-voiced musician Huang Kun, a warm-hearted music artist. This was Zhang Xingte's first large-scale music performance.

On November 30, 2020, he sang the opening song "The Only You in the World" for the online drama "浪花男神" (浪花 Boys).

On February 17, 2021, he participated in the idol survival reality show "CHUANG 2021" on Tencent Video, marking his variety show debut. He performed songs such as "When I Met You, All the Stars Fell on My Head", "Love That Never Loses Connection", and "Lover Boy 88". He successfully advanced to the finals, eventually graduating with the 16th-place result, and continues to pursue a career as a solo singer.

On June 17, 2021, he won the "Reilee Annual Most Potential Newcomer Award" at the "潮聚東方·星勢力大賞" (Reilee x Kuaishou).

On August 14, 2021, he won the "Reilee Encounter Fashion New Species" Annual Most Breakthrough Male Singer Award.

== "CHUANG 2021" Era ==
Competition-related Information
Episode	Rank	Change	Votes (Support Value)	Rating	Remarks
Episode 2	26th	—N/a	Support value not disclosed	B → B → B → B → B → B	
Episode 3	27th	▼1	Support value not disclosed	B → B → B → B → B → B	
Episode 4	23rd	▲4	Support value not disclosed	B → B → B → B → B → B	
Episode 5	21st	▲2	5,310,719 Support Value	B → B → B → B → B → B	
Episode 6	23rd	▼2	Support value not disclosed	B → B → B → B → B → B	
Episode 7	18th	▲5	6,416,020 Support Value	B → B → B → B → B → B	
Episode 8	15th	▲3	Support value not disclosed	B → B → B → B → B → B	
Episode 9	16th	▼1	2,950,003 Support Value	B → B → B → B → B → B	
Three days before finals	16th	▬	Support value not disclosed	B → B → B → B → B → B	
One day before finals	16th	▬	Support value not disclosed	B → B → B → B → B → B	
Episode 10	16th	▬	2,572,435 Support Value	B → B → B → B → B → B	Not in the final group

== Variety Show Performances ==
=== Performances in Chuang 2021 ===
Performance Date	Song Details	Remarks
February 20, 2021	*When I Met You, All the Stars Fell on My Head*: Stage: Initial Evaluation; Original Artist: Gao Shan; Co-performers: Huang Kun, He Zhenyu; Note: Named Group Support King	Episode 1 (Part 1)
February 20, 2021	*Unbreakable Love*: Stage: Initial Evaluation Battle (Solo); Original Artist: Eric Chou; Note: Passed	Episode 1 (Part 2)
March 6, 2021	*Lover Boy 88*: Stage: First Public Performance; Original Artist: Higher Brothers & Phum Viphurit; Co-performers: Lin Mo, Zhang Jiayuan, Zhang Teng, Higumi Hiroto, Chen Junjie	Episode 3 (Part 2)
March 10, 2021	Official Theme Song Performance: *Together We Go* (Chinese), *Chuang To-Gather Go!* (English); Original Song; Co-performers: All Trainees	
March 13, 2021	*DREAM*: Stage: Remix Performance; Based on *Chuang 2021* theme song; Co-performers: Mika, Wu Yuheng, Zeng Hanjiang, He Yifan, Li Jiaxiang	Episode 4 (Part 2)
March 28, 2021	*Don't Think of Me*: Stage: Second Public Performance; Original Artist: Hebe Tien; Co-performers: Mika, Yin Haoyu/Patrick, Gao Qingchen, Yu Gengyin	Episode 6 (Part 2)
April 10, 2021	*Typing Cute on Fifth Key*: Stage: Third Public Performance; Original Song; Co-performers: Mika, Wu Yuheng, Gao Qingchen, Xue Bayi, Zeng Hanjiang; Guest Performer: Ju Jingyi	Episode 8
April 24, 2021	*Definition*: Stage: Final Dance Performance; Original Song; Co-performers: Boyuan, Gan Wangxing, Higumi Hiroto, Ren Yinpeng, Yu Gengyin, Yuto Hayuda, Zhang Xinyao	Live Finale
April 24, 2021	*If Only*: Stage: Final Solo Vocal (Group A); Original Artist: Eric Chou; Note: First time trending on Weibo at #26	Live Finale

=== Performances in Best Stage Autumn Limited ===
Performance Date	Song Details	Remarks
November 27, 2021	*Suicidal Sperm Whale*: Original Artist: Three Planks of Wood; Co-performers: Xu Ziwei, Wu Hai, Ling Chao, Hu Chunyang, Oscar, Qing Lian	Episode 1 (Part 2)
December 4, 2021	*Never Stop*: Original Artist: —; Co-performers: Xu Ziwei, Wu Hai, Ling Chao, Hu Chunyang, Oscar, Qing Lian	Episode 2 (Part 2)
December 11, 2021	*Youthful Dreams*: Original Artist: —; Co-performers: Xu Ziwei, Wu Hai, Ling Chao, Hu Chunyang, Oscar, Qing Lian	Episode 3 (Part 2)
December 18, 2021	*You Who's 105 Degrees Hot*: Original Artist: —; Co-performers: Xu Ziwei, Wu Hai, Ling Chao, Hu Chunyang, Oscar, Qing Lian	Episode 4 (Part 2)
November 16, 2021; December 25, 2021	*Three Kingdoms Love*: Original Artist: Lü Jianzhong; Co-performers: Xu Ziwei, Wu Hai, Ling Chao, Hu Chunyang, Oscar, Qing Lian	Pre-show Livestream; Episode 5 (Part 2)
November 16, 2021; December 25, 2021	*The Bugs Fly*: Original Artist: Ekin Cheng	Pre-show Livestream; Episode 5 (Part 2)

== Music Works ==
=== Charity Singles ===
Release Date	Song Title	Song Details	Remarks
July 5, 2022	*People Who Love to Smile*	Lyrics / Composer: Xu Shan; Arrangement: Qin Tian; Label: Qiu Zhen Entertainment	
July 14, 2022	*Wind Speaks to Me*	Lyrics / Composer: Hong Xi; Arrangement: Chen Su; Label: Super Brainhole	

=== Cover Singles ===
Release Date	Song Title	Song Details	Remarks
June 9, 2020	*7%*: Original Artist: XMASwu	Lyrics: XMASwu / Shiqicao; Composer: XMASwu; Arrangement: Dr. Wang	
September 1, 2021	*Let Me Sing a Song for You*: Original Artist: Zhang Han; Original Title: *Let Me Sing a Song for You*	Lyrics: Yan Yidan; Composer: Yan Yidan / Liu Jia; Arrangement: Guan Tiantian	Classic Song Remake Project
March 26, 2022	*A Smile is Alluring*: Original Artist: Silence Wang	Lyrics: Finale; Composer: Silence Wang; Arrangement: Dr. Wang	
August 23, 2022	*Orange Soda*: Original Artist: Nan Quan Mama	Lyrics: Lin Lihui; Composer: Jay Chou; Arrangement: Jiang Zhang	Youth Reset Project Vol.6 – Special Soda Edition

=== OST ===
Release Date	Song Title	Credits	Notes
2020-11-30	The Only You in the World	Lyrics/Composer: Liang Dongjiang; Arrangement: Ren Bin, Chen Yuxiao; Label: Sony Music	Opening theme of the web drama *Hello Mr. Gu*
2023-04-06	No Doubt in Us	Lyrics/Composer: Peanut, Ai Shiyu; Arrangement: Feng Fan; Label: Wisdom Big Dog × Huace Music	Ending theme of the TV drama *No Doubt in Us*
2024-03-04	Secret of Parallel Time	Lyrics: Zhang Ying; Composer: Zheng Guofeng; Arrangement: Luo Yaxin	Insert song of the web drama *Just in Time*

=== Singles ===
Release Date	Song Title	Credits	Notes
2018-08-18	Nan Fei De Yan	Lyrics: Yang Dongliang; Composer: Yang Dongliang; Arranger: Mingzi	
2019-06-26	Xing Guang	Lyrics: Lu Yifan; Composer: Lu Yifan	
2019-12-26	Fang Xiang	Lyrics: Chen Qian; Composer: Zhao Yanan; Arranger: Zhao Yanan	
2020-03-28	Wan Liu	Lyrics: Zhang Xingte; Composer: Zhang Xingte; Arranger: Dr. Wang	Original single
2020-09-04	Ni Wo Zhi Jian	Lyrics: Xiao Teng; Composer: Xiao Teng	
2020-09-12	Baltic Sea	Lyrics: CMJ; Composer: Wu Jianzhong	
2020-10-13	somebody	Lyrics: Li Tianyang; Composer: Li Tianyang	
2020-11-28	Duo Xihuan Ni	Lyrics: Hou Zhi'ao; Composer: Xiao Teng / Zheng Guofeng; Arranger: Li Linxuan	
2021-06-12	Youthful Joy	Lyrics: Tianci; Composer: Lu Yan / Zhang Xingte; Arranger: Liu Yifan	
2021-07-20	Summer Voyage	Lyrics: He Zi; Composer: Fang Kaihao; Arranger: Dr. Wang	
2021-10-18	I Know You Never Left Me	Lyrics: Zhang Xingte; Composer: Zhang Xingte; Arranger: Zhou Fujian	Original single
2021-12-12	Rain Towards the Sun	Lyrics: Lin Qiao / Ling; Composer: Ying Di; Arranger: Ying Di	
2022-05-27	Romantic Branch	Lyrics: Zhang Xingte; Composer: Zhang Xingte; Arranger: Zhang Jiejun	Original single
2022-06-20	Iced Summer	Lyrics: He Zi; Composer: He Zi; Arranger: Yu Honglong	
2022-07-15	Heartbeat Summer Panic	Lyrics: Yan Shiba; Composer: Sun Changlei; Arranger: Duomo	
2022-09-25	Dawang Park	Lyrics: Zheng Zhihuan; Composer: Xingzi; Arranger: Zhang Xiangnan	
2023-03-31	Exclusive Sign	Lyrics: Kong Baisen; Composer: Kong Baisen; Arranger: Yu Honglong	
2023-04-17	Before You Leave Me	Lyrics: Zhang Pengpeng; Composer: Dong Jiahong; Arranger: Wu Wei	
2023-05-05	Picking Flowers	Lyrics: Zhang Zaibei; Composer: Kairen Ma; Arranger: Wu Wei	
2023-05-19	Painting	Lyrics: Wang Senlong; Composer: Liu Yichen; Arranger: Orange Juice er @Yigeseiting	
2023-06-23	Racing Through the World	Lyrics: Ran Yi; Composer: Li Pengqian; Arranger: Zhang Xingte / Ice Americano Band	
2023-11-24	Four Seasons	Lyrics: Zhang Xingte / Hou Zhi'ao; Composer: Zhang Xingte / Zheng Guofeng; Arranger: Zeng Wu Qiujie	
2024-01-01	On the Day We Agreed to Meet	Lyrics: Ran Yi / Jiajia; Composer: Li Pengqian; Arranger: Ice Americano Band	
2024-01-20	A Story Still Serializing	Lyrics: Hu Qihao; Composer: Hu Qihao; Arranger: Xiao Yun	
2024-04-24	Story	Lyrics: Xia Weichun; Composer: Xia Weichun; Arranger: Park Sangsong	
2025-02-11	Love is_	Lyrics: Yue Wanqing; Composer: Chimu; Arranger: Min Chengwei	

=== EPs ===
Release Order	Album Info	Track List
1st	Letter to the Future of 18: Digital release date: 2021-08-11; Label: Beijing Zhongshi Mingda Cultural Media Co., Ltd.	1. Bufen; 2. Weidu Ni; 3. Cong Bu Ceng Likai

=== Albums ===
Release Order	Album Info	Track List
1st	Where to? What's the Dream?: Physical release: pre-sale from 2023-02-19; Label: Beijing Zhongshi Mingda Cultural Media Co., Ltd.	1. Dawang Park; 2. Iced Summer; 3. Rain Towards the Sun; 4. Romantic Branch (Original); 5. Before You Leave Me; 6. I Know You Never Left Me (Original); 7. Picking Flowers; 8. Exclusive Sign
2nd	Whispers of Flow: Physical release: TBA; Digital release: 2024-08-28; Label: Beijing Zhongshi Mingda Cultural Media Co., Ltd.	1. About Him (Original); 2. Flutter (Original); 3. Like Wind Stops at You; 4. Eternal Moment; 5. I Know You're Waiting (Original); 6. What Should Be (Original); 7. Don't Be Sad, He Never Was (Original); 8. Yan (Original)

== Filmography ==
=== Television / Web Dramas ===
Air Date	Title	Role	Platform
November 2, 2022	You Are My Delicious	Shen Xiaodi (younger brother of the female lead), cameo	iQIYI

=== Variety Shows ===
Air Date	Channel	Show Title	Notes
February 17 – April 24, 2021	Tencent Video	Produce Camp 2021	Contestant (Final ranking: 16th place)
2021 (TBA)	Tencent Video	Will Campers Become Idiots in Another Dimension? – Ep. 4	Spin-off of Produce Camp 2021
July 25, 2021	Dragon TV	Lightning Café	
November 16 – 25, 2021	Baishi TV	The Best Stage – Autumn Limited	
April 7 – 10, 2022	Tencent Video	Shining Days	Guest (Friend of Yu Gengyin)
2022	Tencent Video	Shining Days: Season 2	Guest appearance
August 31, 2022	Bilibili	Bilibili Go Forward	
September 17, 2022	Tencent Video	Taohuawu in Progress	Spin-off of Fifty Miles Taohuawu
September 16, 2022	Tencent Video	Heart-Pounding Stage	
December 22, 2022	Mango TV	100% Open Mic	
June 15, 2023	Youku	Happy Ma Hua	
August 3, 2023	Tencent Video	Energetic Summer	Previously titled Taohuawu in Progress: Season 2
August 4, 2023	Tencent Video	Voice Beyond Ordinary	Mentor
August 29, 2023	Tencent Video	Splashing Summer	
April 19, 2024	Tencent Video	Our Season: Season 2	Guardian Officer
April 26, 2024	Z Vision Media	Magical Karaoke Room	Spin-off of The Treasured Voice
May 11, 2024	Zhejiang TV	Lucky Traveler	Guest appearance
May 15, 2024	Tencent Video	100% Singer	
November 12, 2024	Tencent Video	Taohuawu in Progress: Season 3 – Wilderness Edition	

== Tours ==
No.	Date	Country/Region	City	Venue
1	June 12, 2021	China	Shanghai	BFC Bund Finance Center

=== "SPECIAL STAR" Beijing Fan Meeting ===
No.	Date	Country/Region	City	Venue
1	July 10, 2021	China	Beijing	TANGO Livehouse

=== "Zhang Xingte: Special Star System" Four-City Tour ===
No.	Date	Country/Region	City	Venue
1	September 30, 2021	China	Guangzhou	Dashijiang (Big Space)
2	October 17, 2021	China	Chengdu	Zhenghuo Art Center
3	October 23, 2021	China	Hangzhou	MAO Livehouse
4	December 12, 2021	China	Changsha	46Lifehouse

=== XT211 · Zhang Xingte Birthday Party ===
No.	Date	Country/Region	City	Venue
1	February 11, 2022	China	Nanjing	Daoxiang Music Space

=== "Zhang Xingte · Planet Tour" Ten-City Tour ===
No.	Date	Country/Region	City	Venue
1	June 19, 2022	China	Hangzhou	MAO Livehouse
2	July 2, 2022	China	Changsha	46Livehouse
3	July 17, 2022	China	Guangzhou	Space Livehouse
4	August 21, 2022	China	Chengdu	Yinpai Power
5	September 24, 2022	China	Nanjing	Daoxiang Music Space
6	November 4, 2022	China	Wenzhou	Yi Space
7	February 19, 2023	China	Xiamen	WOKESHOW Star Nest
8	February 25, 2023	China	Tianjin	Damai 66 Livehouse
9	March 10, 2023	China	Wuhan	Youka Live (relocated to Tianhan Grand Theater)
10	March 12, 2023	China	Chongqing	Yinpai Power

=== Zhang Xingte Birthday Party "Welcome to the Romantic Branch" ===
No.	Date	Country/Region	City	Venue
1	February 11, 2023	China	Shanghai	ModernSkyLAB

=== "Seasons Approaching" ===
No.	Date	Country/Region	City	Venue
1	August 25, 2023	Australia	Melbourne	Arrow On Swanston
2	August 27, 2023	Australia	Sydney	Oxford Art Factory

=== "Seasons" ===
No.	Date	Country/Region	City	Venue	Notes
1	September 24, 2023	China	Guangzhou	Dashijiang (Big Space)	
2	September 30, 2023	China	Beijing	Fulang Livehouse	
3	October 20, 2023	China	Changsha	AMO	
4	October 22, 2023	China	Chongqing	Yinpai Power	
5	November 3, 2023	China	Nanjing	Daoxiang Music Space	
6	November 11, 2023	China	Jinan	Caper Land	
7	November 18, 2023	China	Wuhan	Kanjian Performing Arts Space	
8	December 2, 2023	China	Hangzhou	Damai 66 Livehouse	
9	December 8, 2023	China	Xiamen	WOKESHOW Star Nest	Guest: Baila Jiaoye Yongquan
10	December 10, 2023	China	Shanghai	MAO	
11	December 23, 2023	China	Shenzhen	SoFun Live	
12	December 31, 2023	China	Tianjin	Damai 66 Livehouse	
13	January 6, 2024	China	Wenzhou	Yi Space	Guest: Zhao Rang
14	January 13, 2024	China	Chengdu	Zhenghuo Art Center	
15	January 20, 2024	China	Nanchang	Vas Livehouse	

=== Zhang Xingte 2024 "Escape from Nemo Point" Concert Tour ===
No.	Date	Country/Region	City	Venue	Notes
1	August 31, 2024	China	Shanghai	AIA Grand Theatre, North Bund	
2	September 21, 2024	China	Shenzhen	Shekou Fenghua Grand Theatre	
3	November 9, 2024	China	Tianjin	Jinwan Grand Theatre	
4	December 28, 2024	China	Wuhan	Han Show Theatre, Wuhan	

== Awards ==
=== Major Award Ceremonies ===
Year	Event	Award	Work
June 17, 2021	Rayli	Most Promising Newcomer	
August 14, 2021	Rayli	Breakthrough Male Singer	
August 28, 2022	Trendy Youth	Emerging Fashion Singer	
January 18, 2025	Shanghai Pop Golden Melody Carnival	Best Original New Star of the Year	

== Produce Camp 2021 Summary ==
Category	Rank/Name	Notes
Debuted in INTO1	Liu Yu, Zanduo, Lixiao, Mika, Gao Qingchen, Lin Mo, Boyuan, Zhang Jiayuan, Yin Haoyu, Zhou Keyu, Liu Zhang	
4th round Eliminated (Rank 12–25)	Qing Lian, Oscar, Gan Wangxing, Jing Ji Daxiao, Zhang Xingte, Li Luxiu, Wu Yuheng, Ren Yinpeng, Zhang Xinyao, Yu Gengyin, Fu Sichao, Hu Yetao, Yubing Tian Ju, Xue Bayi	
3rd round Eliminated (Rank 26–33)	Jing Long, Zeng Hanjiang, Xie Xingyang, Wu Hai, He Yifan, Wei Ziyue, Zhang Teng, Rongyao	
2nd round Eliminated (Rank 34–55)	Gui Shangqi, Kamihara Ichikyo, Noyan, Luoyan, Sato Eisho, Ye Haoran, Han Peiquan, Lu Dinghao, Shao Mingming, Li Luol, Yu Yang, Wang Xiaocheng, Qu Baiyu, Jiang Dunhao, Dai Shaodong, Huang Kun, Ichinose Asuka, He Zhenyu, Xu Shaolan, He Yijun, Zhang Zhang, Fan Zhen'er	
1st round Eliminated (Rank 56–89)	David, Li Zekun, Lin Yuxiu, Li Jiahao, Duzhu Xiongya, Liu Tanghui, Yi Han, Xinei Youxin, Li Jiaxiang, Lai Yaoxiang, Cao Zuo, Ling Xiao, Li Peiyang, Li Zhengting, Menkaku Shingo, Lin Dou, Yuanbu Ling, Chen Junjie, Xiao Lihuan, Liu Yan Dongji, Zheng Mingxin, Liu Cong, Tiangou Xinya, Gu Liulin, Wei Yujie, Andy, Akutsu Junli, Qian Zhengyu, Luke, Chen Ruifeng, Li Tailong, Sumida Sunping, Xu Shengzi, Wang Zehao	
Withdrawn Contestants	He Ma	
Mentors	Deng Chao, Ning Jing, Zhou Shen, Liu Yiyun, Zhou Zhennan, Zheng Naixin, Kimura Mitsuki (Special Invited Mentor), Gong Jun (Dream Facilitator)	
Third Performance Support Sisters	Liu Yiyun, Zheng Naixin, Meng Meiqi, Liu Xiening, Mao Xiaotong, Ju Jingyi	
Related Groups	WARPs UP (Japanese: ), SWIN, INTERSECTION (Japanese: ), Easy Music Society, BEST New Youth Boys, ZERO-G	
Related Articles	Tencent Video, We Are Together, Episode List	
