= 5D (Fifth Dimension) =

- West German picture sleeve

Single by the Byrds

from the album Fifth Dimension
- B-side: "Captain Soul"
- Released: June 13, 1966
- Recorded: May 24–25, 1966
- Studio: Columbia, Hollywood, California
- Genre: Folk rock, psychedelic rock
- Length: 2:33
- Label: Columbia
- Songwriter(s): Jim McGuinn
- Producer(s): Allen Stanton

The Byrds singles chronology
"Eight Miles High" (1966)	"5D (Fifth Dimension)" (1966)	"Mr. Spaceman" (1966)

"5D (Fifth Dimension)" is a song by the American rock band the Byrds, written by band member Jim McGuinn. It was released as a single in June 1966, and also included as the title track on the Byrds' third album, Fifth Dimension.

== Lyrical content ==
McGuinn has described the song's lyrics as an attempt to explain Albert Einstein's theory of relativity, and as having been directly inspired by the book 1-2-3-4, More, More, More, More by Don Landis. In a 1966 interview with Hit Parader magazine, McGuinn stated, "It's sort of weird but...what I'm talking about is the whole universe, the fifth dimension, which is height, width, depth, time and something else. But there definitely are more dimensions than five. It's infinite. The fifth dimension is the threshold of scientific knowledge." Talking to Michael Ross of Creem magazine in 1970, McGuinn further explained the song's meaning: "'5D' was an ethereal trip into metaphysics, into an almost Moslem submission to an Allah, an almighty spirit, free-floating, the fifth dimension being the 'mesh' which Einstein theorized about. He proved theoretically - but I choose to believe it."

According to the Byrds' biographer Johnny Rogan, the song's abstract lyrics were largely interpreted by the band's audience as being about an LSD trip, much to McGuinn's dismay. The notion that the song was about psychedelic drugs was given further credence when it was singled out, within a month of its release, by Variety magazine as one of a recent spate of pop songs containing references to illegal drug use. As a result of these allegations, the song was banned by some radio stations in the U.S.

== Recording and release ==
The master recording of "5D (Fifth Dimension)" was taped on May 24 and 25, 1966, during sessions for the Fifth Dimension album, with Allen Stanton serving as record producer. The song features the Bach-influenced organ and electric piano playing of Los Angeles composer, arranger, producer, and session musician, Van Dyke Parks.

The song was issued as a single on June 13, 1966, and reached number 44 on the Billboard Hot 100, but failed to chart in the United Kingdom. The song was also included on the band's third album, Fifth Dimension, which was released on July 18, 1966.

Billboard magazine described the single as an "off-beat lyric rocker with chart-topping potential". Cash Box described the song as a "rhythmic, medium-paced, blues-soaked tale of rejection about a somewhat disoriented young man." Critic Bruce Eder, writing for the AllMusic website, called the song, "the most improbable single ever issued by the Byrds", and "the most daring opening track ever on any Byrds album." He went on to note that it followed the release of the band's influential "Eight Miles High" single, although, in his opinion, "5D (Fifth Dimension)" was more challenging and arguably took the Byrds' psychedelic experimentation to further extremes." "5D (Fifth Dimension)" was a favorite of the Byrds' bass player, Chris Hillman, who described it as "one of the greatest songs McGuinn has ever written."

Following its release, "5D (Fifth Dimension)" was performed sporadically during the Byrds' 1966 live concerts, but was abandoned for most of the rest of the group's lifespan. However, the song is frequently performed by McGuinn during his solo concerts and consequently appears on his 2007 live album, Live From Spain.

In addition to its appearance on the Fifth Dimension album, "5D (Fifth Dimension)" also appears on several Byrds' compilations, including The Byrds' Greatest Hits, History of The Byrds, The Original Singles: 1965–1967, Volume 1, The Byrds, The Very Best of The Byrds, The Essential Byrds, and There Is a Season.
