= Allen Stanton =

American music executive (1924–2015)

- Born: November 23, 1924; New York City, New York, U.S.
- Died: March 11, 2015 (aged 90); Los Angeles, California, U.S.
- Genres: R&B; rock; pop
- Occupation(s): Music executive, record producer
- Years active: 1960s–1990s
- Labels: Kapp, Columbia, A&M, RCA

Allen 'Al' Stanton (November 23, 1924 – March 11, 2015) was an American music executive and record producer best known for his production work for The Byrds on their third album, Fifth Dimension (1966).

== Early career ==
Stanton was born and raised in New York City, the youngest of eight children. He began as a stock boy in a publishing house, working his way up to become general professional manager at Sheldon Music, a New York-based publishing company headed by Aaron "Goldie" Goldmark.

As a producer and A&R man for Goldmark's independent company, he worked on singles by such artists as Paul Evans ("Seven Little Girls Sitting in the Backseat") and Jimmy Jones ("Handy Man," "Good Timin'"). He often worked with composer Otis Blackwell, and he reportedly inspired the composition of "All Shook Up," a 1957 hit for Elvis Presley, by shaking a bottle of Pepsi and telling Blackwell to write a song based on the phrase "all shook up."

In 1962, Stanton was named A&R director of Kapp Records. Kapp signed an Akron, Ohio-based R&B group led by Ruby Nash, and Stanton suggested they call themselves Ruby & the Romantics. He produced several singles for Ruby & the Romantics, including their 1963 Billboard #1 hit "Our Day Will Come." Other Kapp artists produced by Stanton included Johnny Cymbal, who had a #16 hit on the Billboard pop chart in 1963, "Mr. Bass Man."

== Columbia Records ==
Stanton moved to Los Angeles in 1964 to head the West Coast A&R department of Columbia Records, joining a staff that included Edward Kleban, Terry Melcher, and Bruce Johnston. His production credits for Columbia included several albums by Doris Day: The Doris Day Christmas Album (1964), With a Smile and a Song (1964), Latin for Lovers (1965), and Doris Day's Sentimental Journey (1965). For The New Christy Minstrels he produced The New Christy Minstrels Sing and Play Cowboys and Indians (1965), and for Billy Joe Royal he supervised the album Down in the Boondocks (1965).

With Ernie Altschuler, Stanton produced Tony Bennett's "The Shadow of Your Smile (Love Theme from The Sandpiper)," introduced in the 1965 film The Sandpiper. The song would go on to win the Grammy Award for Song of the Year and the Academy Award for Best Original Song. Additional Columbia production credits included the albums Come Alive! by Joanie Sommers (1966) and Bim! Bam!! Boom!!! by Percy Faith (1966).

=== Production work for The Byrds ===
Terry Melcher, the son of Doris Day, produced the first two albums by The Byrds for Columbia, but he came into conflict with the band's manager, Jim Dickson, who hoped to produce the Byrds himself. Dickson, with the support of the Byrds, approached Columbia and insisted that Melcher be replaced. Columbia chose Stanton rather than Dickson to replace Melcher, however, because of studio regulations specifying that only in-house Columbia employees could produce records by the label's acts.

In December 1965, the Byrds entered RCA Studios in Los Angeles to record two new songs, "Eight Miles High" and "Why." Columbia refused to release either song because they had not been recorded at a Columbia-owned studio. The band was forced to re-record both songs at Columbia Studios in January 1966 with Stanton as producer. The re-recorded "Eight Miles High" (with "Why" as the B-side) was released as a single in March 1966, reaching #14 on the Billboard pop chart. Stanton went on to produce the Byrds' next single, "5D (Fifth Dimension)" (June 1966, #44 pop). Both singles were included on the album Fifth Dimension, released in July. The album generated an additional single, "Mr. Spaceman" (Sept. 1966, #36 pop).

Despite praise for the pioneering psychedelic sound of "Eight Miles High," Stanton's production work on the Fifth Dimension album has been criticized as uneven. Byrds bassist Chris Hillman later recalled, "All I remember is Allen Stanton would be over – with his shirt and tie, sleeves rolled up – reading the newspaper. Basically he was going, 'These guys know what they're doing. I'll just sort of be in here.'"

== Later career ==
Soon after the Fifth Dimension sessions, Stanton left Columbia to join the staff of A&M Records. For A&M he produced releases by Jimmie Rodgers, including his albums Child of Clay (1967) and Windmills of Your Mind (1969). Other A&M artists he produced included The Sandpipers and Brewer & Shipley.

After leaving A&M in 1969, he was vice president and general manager of MGM's Big Three Publishing. In 1974, Stanton briefly served as label manager of Warner-Spector Records, an outlet for Phil Spector productions by Warner Bros. Records. He resigned to join RCA Records as general manager of music publishing.

Stanton died in Los Angeles on March 11, 2015, at the age of 90.
