= Eight Miles High =

- U.S. picture sleeve

Single by the Byrds

from the album Fifth Dimension
- B-side: "Why"
- Released: March 14, 1966
- Recorded: January 24–25, 1966
- Studio: Columbia, Hollywood
- Genre: Psychedelic rock; raga rock; psychedelic pop
- Length: 3:33
- Label: Columbia
- Songwriters: Gene Clark; Jim McGuinn; David Crosby
- Producer: Allen Stanton

The Byrds singles chronology
"Set You Free This Time" / "It Won't Be Wrong" (1966)	"Eight Miles High" (1966)	"5D (Fifth Dimension)" (1966)

Music video
- "Eight Miles High" (audio) on YouTube

"Eight Miles High" is a song by the American rock band the Byrds, written by Gene Clark, Jim McGuinn (later known as Roger McGuinn), and David Crosby. It was first released as a single on March 14, 1966. Musically influenced by sitar player Ravi Shankar and jazz saxophonist John Coltrane, the song was influential in developing the musical styles of psychedelia and raga rock. Accordingly, critics often cite "Eight Miles High" as being the first bona fide psychedelic rock song, as well as a classic of the counterculture era.

The song was subject to a U.S. radio ban shortly after its release, following allegations published in the broadcasting trade journal the Gavin Report regarding perceived drug connotations in its lyrics. The band strenuously denied these allegations at the time, but in later years both Clark and Crosby admitted that the song was at least partly inspired by their drug use. The failure of "Eight Miles High" to reach the Billboard Top 10 is usually attributed to the broadcasting ban, but some commentators have suggested the song's complexity and uncommercial nature were greater factors.

"Eight Miles High" reached number 14 on the Billboard Hot 100 chart, number 9 on Canada's RPM chart, number 16 on the New Zealand listener chart, and number 24 on the UK Singles Chart. The song was also included on the band's third album, Fifth Dimension, which was released on July 18, 1966. "Eight Miles High" became the Byrds' third and final U.S. Top 20 hit, and was their last release before the departure of Clark, who was the band's principal songwriter at the time.

== History ==
=== Composition ===
The song's lyrics are, for the most part, about the group's flight to London in August 1965 and their accompanying English tour, as hinted at by the opening couplet: "Eight miles high and when you touch down, you'll find that it's stranger than known." Although commercial airliners fly at an altitude of six to seven miles, it was felt that "eight miles high" sounded more poetic than six and also alluded to the title of the Beatles' song "Eight Days a Week".

According to Clark, the lyrics were primarily his creation, with a minor contribution being Crosby's line, "Rain grey town, known for its sound"—a reference to London as home to the British Invasion, which was then dominating the U.S. music charts. Other lyrics in the song that explicitly refer to the Byrds' stay in England include the couplet: "Nowhere is there warmth to be found/Among those afraid of losing their ground", which is a reference to the hostile reaction of the UK music press and to the English group the Birds serving the band with a writ of copyright infringement because of the similarities in their names. In addition, "Round the squares, huddled in storms/Some laughing, some just shapeless forms" describes fans waiting for the band outside hotels, while the line "Sidewalk scenes and black limousines" refers to the excited crowds that jostled the band as they exited their chauffeur-driven cars.

Although the basic idea for the song had been discussed during the band's flight to England, it did not begin to take shape until the Byrds' November 1965 tour of the U.S. To alleviate the boredom of traveling from show to show during the tour, Crosby had brought along cassette recordings of Ravi Shankar's music and the John Coltrane albums Impressions and Africa/Brass, which were on constant rotation on the tour bus. The impact of these recordings on the band would manifest itself in the music of "Eight Miles High" and its B-side "Why"—both of which were influential in the development of the musical styles of psychedelic rock, raga rock, and psychedelic pop.

Clark began writing the song's lyrics on November 24, 1965, when he scribbled down some rough ideas for later development, after a discussion with Rolling Stones guitarist Brian Jones, before the Byrds made a concert appearance supporting that British band. Over the following days, Clark expanded this fragment into a full poem, eventually setting the words to music and giving them a melody. Clark then showed the song to McGuinn and Crosby. McGuinn suggested that the song be arranged to incorporate Coltrane's influence. Since Clark's death, however, McGuinn has contended it was he who conceived the initial idea of writing a song about an airplane ride and that he and Crosby both contributed lyrics to Clark's unfinished draft. In his book, Mr. Tambourine Man: The Life and Legacy of the Byrds' Gene Clark, author John Einarson disputes this claim and ponders whether McGuinn's story would be the same if Clark was still alive.

=== Recording ===
Eight Miles High
An excerpt from the intro of "Eight Miles High", demonstrating the John Coltrane-influenced, free form guitar playing of Roger McGuinn and the droning quality of the song's vocals.

The master recording of "Eight Miles High" was recorded on January 24 and 25, 1966, at Columbia Studios in Hollywood. Record producer Allen Stanton guided the band through the recording process. John Einarson has commented that the influence of Coltrane's saxophone playing and, in particular his song "India" from the Impressions album, can be heard clearly in "Eight Miles High"—most noticeably in McGuinn's recurring twelve-string guitar solo. In addition to this striking guitar motif, the song is also highlighted by Chris Hillman's driving and hypnotic bass line, Crosby's chunky rhythm guitar playing and the band's ethereal harmonies.

"Eight Miles High" also exhibits the influence of sitarist Ravi Shankar, particularly in the droning quality of the song's vocal melody and in McGuinn's guitar playing. However, the song does not actually feature the sound of the sitar, despite the Byrds having appeared brandishing the instrument at a contemporary press conference held to promote the single.

In a 1966 promotional interview, which was added to the expanded CD reissue of the Fifth Dimension album, Crosby said that the song's ending made him "feel like a plane landing."

An earlier version of "Eight Miles High" was recorded with Al Schmitt at RCA Studios in Los Angeles on December 22, 1965, but Columbia Records refused to release that recording because it had not been produced at a Columbia-owned studio. McGuinn has since said he believes this original version of the song to be more spontaneous sounding than the better known Columbia release. That opinion was echoed by Crosby, who commented, "It was a stunner, it was better, it was stronger. It had more flow to it. It was the way we wanted it to be." This original version of "Eight Miles High" was eventually released on the 1987 archival album Never Before and was also included as a bonus track on the 1996 Columbia/Legacy CD reissue of Fifth Dimension.

== Release and legacy ==
=== U.S. radio ban ===
"Eight Miles High" was released on March 14, 1966, in the U.S. and May 29, 1966, in the UK, reaching number 14 on the Billboard Hot 100, and number 24 on the UK Singles Chart. It also reached number 9 on Canada's RPM chart, and number 16 on the New Zealand listener chart. The song was included on the band's third album, Fifth Dimension, which was released on July 18, 1966.

Following its U.S. release, the band faced allegations of advocating the use of recreational drugs in Bill Gavin's Record Report, a weekly newsletter circulated to U.S. radio stations. This resulted in "Eight Miles High" being banned in a number of states within a week of the report being published, a factor which contributed to the single's failure to break into the Billboard Top 10. The Byrds and their publicist, Derek Taylor, countered by strenuously denying that the song was drug-related. Taylor issued an indignant press release stating unequivocally that the song was about the band's trip to England and not drug use. However, by the early 1980s, both Crosby and Clark admitted that the song was not entirely as innocent as they had originally declared. Crosby said: "Of course it was a drug song! We were stoned when we wrote it." Clark was less blunt, explaining in an interview that "it was about a lot of things. It was about the airplane trip to England, it was about drugs, it was about all that. A piece of poetry of that nature is not limited to having it have to be just about airplanes or having it have to be just about drugs. It was inclusive because during those days the new experimenting with all the drugs was a very vogue thing to do."

Research analyst Mark Teehan, writing for Popular Musicology Online, has challenged the widely held view among critics, music historians and the Byrds themselves that the U.S. radio ban hurt sales of "Eight Miles High". He points out that although the Gavin Report recommended that radio stations withdraw the single from airplay, many stations did not comply with this suggestion. In addition, he notes that the radio ban was not suggested by the Gavin Report until April 29, 1966, almost seven weeks after the single had been released—ample time for it to have made its mark on the charts. Teehan has uncovered evidence showing "Eight Miles High" was already decelerating on the national charts before the end of April 1966. Having examined the local music surveys and the Billboard regional retail sales charts as they relate to the national charting of "Eight Miles High", Teehan found that the progressive, complex and uncommercial nature of the song was a much bigger factor in its failure to reach the Billboard Top 10. Commercial radio stations were reluctant to play songs that were over two-and-a-half minutes long during the mid-1960s, and the song suffered from uncoordinated and inefficient promotion by Columbia Records. Teehan's research revealed that "Eight Miles High" failed to reach the Top Five in any of his 23 sample regional markets, and most telling, among the thirty radio stations included within this sample, it reached the Top 10 on only seven of them (23%).

=== Influence and reception ===
The Byrds at the "Eight Miles High" press conference in March 1966, posing with a sitar in order to illustrate the Indian influences present in the song.

The song's use of Indian and free-form jazz influences, along with its impressionistic lyrics, were immediately influential on the emerging genre of psychedelic rock. Accordingly, some authors and music historians, including Eric V. D. Luft, Domenic Priore, and Dwight Rounds, have described "Eight Miles High" as being the first bona fide psychedelic rock song. In his book Riot On Sunset Strip: Rock 'n' Roll's Last Stand in Hollywood, Priore cites the song as the one that kicked off the psychedelic craze, explaining "prior to 'Eight Miles High,' there were no pop records with incessant, hypnotic basslines juxtaposed by droning, trance-induced improvisational guitar."

The song was responsible for the naming of the musical subgenre raga rock, when journalist Sally Kempton, in her review of the single for The Village Voice, used the term to describe the record's experimental fusion of eastern and western music. However, although Kempton was the first person to use the term raga rock in print, she actually borrowed the phrase from the promotional material the Byrds' press office had supplied to accompany the "Eight Miles High" single release. In a 1968 interview for the Pop Chronicles radio documentary, McGuinn denied that the song was an example of raga rock, while Crosby, speaking in 1998, dismissed the term entirely, saying "they kept trying to label us; every time we turned around, they came up with a new one ... it's a bunch of bullshit." Nonetheless, the experimental nature of the song placed the Byrds firmly at the forefront of the burgeoning psychedelic movement, along with the Yardbirds, the Beatles, Donovan and the Rolling Stones, who were all exploring similar musical territory concurrently.

Contemporary reviews for the single were mostly positive, with Billboard magazine describing the song as a "Big beat rhythm rocker with soft lyric ballad vocal and off-beat instrumental backing." Cash Box described the single as a "rhythmic, shufflin’ blues-soaked affair with some real inventive riffs." Record World magazine also praised the song, commenting "It's an eerie tune with lyrics bound to hypnotize. Will climb heights." In the UK, Music Echo described the song as "wild and oriental but still beaty". The publication also suggested that with the release of "Eight Miles High" the Byrds had jumped ahead of the Beatles in terms of creativity, saying "[By] getting their single out now they've beaten the Beatles to the punch, for Paul [McCartney] admitted recently that the Liverpool foursome are working on a similar sound for their new album and single." In recent years, Richie Unterberger, writing for the Allmusic website, has described "Eight Miles High" as "one of the greatest singles of the '60s." Critics often cite "Eight Miles High" as being the first bona fide psychedelic rock song, as well as a classic of the counterculture era.

In 1999, the song was inducted into the Grammy Hall of Fame, an honor reserved for "recordings of lasting qualitative or historical significance that are at least 25 years old." In 2004, Rolling Stone magazine ranked "Eight Miles High" at number 151 on their list of The 500 Greatest Songs of All Time and in March 2005, Q magazine placed the song at number 50 on their list of the 100 Greatest Guitar Tracks.

== Post-release ==
During the same month that "Eight Miles High" was released as a single, the Byrds' primary songwriter, Gene Clark, left the band. His fear of flying was given as the official reason for his departure, but other factors, including his tendency toward anxiety and paranoia, as well as his increasing isolation within the group, were also at work. Following the release of "Eight Miles High" and Clark's departure, the Byrds never again managed to place a single in the Billboard Top 20.

The Byrds performed "Eight Miles High" on a number of television programs during the 1960s and 1970s, including Popside, Drop In, Midweek, and Beat-Club. The song became a staple of the band's live concert repertoire until their final disbandment in 1973. A sixteen-minute live version of "Eight Miles High" was included on the Byrds' (Untitled) album in 1970, and another live version was released as part of the 2008 album, Live at Royal Albert Hall 1971. The song was performed by a reformed lineup of the Byrds featuring Roger McGuinn, David Crosby, and Chris Hillman in January 1989.

The song remained a favorite of Clark's during his post-Byrds solo career and he often performed it at his concert appearances until his death, in 1991. McGuinn also continues to perform an intricate acoustic guitar rendition of the song at his concerts. Crosby has revisited "Eight Miles High" infrequently during his post-Byrds career, but it was performed during Crosby, Stills, Nash & Young's reunion tour of 2000, with Neil Young handling McGuinn's guitar solo, while the other three members sang the song's three-part harmonies. The Byrds' bass player, Chris Hillman, also recorded an acoustic version of "Eight Miles High" as part of his 2005 album, The Other Side.

In addition to its appearance on the Fifth Dimension album, "Eight Miles High" also appears on several Byrds' compilations, including: The Byrds' Greatest Hits, History of The Byrds, The Original Singles: 1965–1967, Volume 1, The Byrds, The Very Best of The Byrds, The Essential Byrds and There Is a Season.

== Cover versions and media references ==
"Eight Miles High" has been covered by many different bands and artists including: the Ventures, Leathercoated Minds, East of Eden, Lighthouse, Leo Kottke, Roxy Music, Ride, Stewart/Gaskin, Robyn Hitchcock, Rockfour, Les Fradkin, the Kennedys, the Postmarks and Steve Hunter. Hüsker Dü released the song as a single prior to the release of their Zen Arcade LP in 1984. The song was covered in 1969 by Golden Earring, who included a nineteen-minute version on their Eight Miles High album. The Emerson, Lake & Palmer spinoff group 3 recorded the song with revised lyrics on their 1988 album, To the Power of Three. Crowded House with Roger McGuinn covered the song on their I Feel Possessed EP.

Don McLean's song "American Pie" makes reference to "Eight Miles High" with the lines "The Birds [sic] flew off with a fall-out shelter / Eight miles high and falling fast." The First Edition's 1968 hit, "Just Dropped In (To See What Condition My Condition Was In)", contains a reference to the song with the line "I tripped on a cloud and fell a-eight miles high." The independent rock band Okkervil River references "Eight Miles High" in its song "Plus Ones", on the 2007 album The Stage Names. Bruce Springsteen's song "Life Itself", from his 2009 album Working on a Dream, features guitar playing and production techniques reminiscent of "Eight Miles High" by the Byrds.

The Byrds' version of "Eight Miles High" is featured in the 1983 film Purple Haze. It appears in both the "Le Voyage dans la Lune" and "The Original Wives Club" episodes of the television miniseries From the Earth to the Moon.

== Personnel ==
- Roger McGuinn – vocals, 12-string guitar
- Gene Clark – vocals
- David Crosby – vocals, guitar
- Chris Hillman – bass guitar
- Michael Clarke – drums
