= Fifth Dimension (album) =

Studio album by the Byrds
- Released: July 18, 1966
- Recorded: January 24 – May 25, 1966
- Studios: Columbia, Hollywood
- Genres: Folk rock; psychedelic rock; raga rock
- Length: 29:59
- Label: Columbia
- Producer: Allen Stanton

The Byrds chronology
Turn! Turn! Turn! (1965)	Fifth Dimension (1966)	Younger Than Yesterday (1967)

Singles from Fifth Dimension
- 1. "Eight Miles High" Released: March 14, 1966; 2. "5D (Fifth Dimension)" Released: June 13, 1966; 3. "Mr. Spaceman" Released: September 6, 1966

Fifth Dimension is the third studio album by the American rock band the Byrds, released on July 18, 1966, by Columbia Records. Most of the album was recorded following the February 1966 departure of the band's principal songwriter Gene Clark. In an attempt to compensate for Clark's absence, guitarists Jim McGuinn and David Crosby increased their songwriting output. In spite of this, the loss of Clark resulted in an album with four cover versions and an instrumental, which critics have described as "wildly uneven" and "awkward and scattered". However, it was the first Byrds album not to include any songs written by Bob Dylan, whose material had previously been a mainstay of the band's repertoire.

The album peaked at number 24 on the Billboard Top LPs chart and reached number 27 on the UK Albums Chart. Two preceding singles, "Eight Miles High" and "5D (Fifth Dimension)", were included on the album, with the former just missing the Top 10 of the Billboard singles chart. Additionally, a third single taken from the album, "Mr. Spaceman", managed to reach the U.S. Top 40. Upon release, Fifth Dimension was widely regarded as the band's most experimental album to date and is today considered by critics to be influential in originating the musical genre of psychedelic rock.

== Background ==
On December 22, 1965, shortly after the release of their second album Turn! Turn! Turn!, the Byrds entered RCA Studios in Los Angeles to record "Eight Miles High" and "Why", two new songs that they had recently composed. Both songs represented a creative leap forward for the band and were instrumental in developing the musical styles of psychedelic rock and raga rock. However, the band ran into trouble with their record company, Columbia Records, who refused to release either song because they had not been recorded at a Columbia-owned studio. As a result, the band were forced to re-record both songs in their entirety at Columbia Studios, Hollywood, and it was these re-recordings that would see release on the "Eight Miles High" single and the Fifth Dimension album.

The re-recordings of "Eight Miles High" and "Why" were produced by Allen Stanton, Columbia's West Coast Vice President, who had recently been assigned to the band following the Byrds' decision to dispense with their previous producer, Terry Melcher. Melcher had guided the Byrds through the recording of their first two folk rock albums, which had included the international hit singles "Mr. Tambourine Man" and "Turn! Turn! Turn!", both of which had reached number 1 in the U.S. charts. However, during sessions for the Turn! Turn! Turn! album, Melcher had found himself in conflict with the band's manager, Jim Dickson, who had aspirations to produce the Byrds himself. Within a month of the band's second album being released, Dickson—with the full support of the Byrds—approached Columbia and insisted that Melcher be replaced. However, any hopes that Dickson had of being allowed to produce the band himself were dashed when the record label chose Allen Stanton as the Byrds new producer. This decision was the result of Columbia studio regulations specifying that only an in-house Columbia employee could produce records by the label's acts. Stanton would work as the Byrds' producer for the duration of the Fifth Dimension recording sessions, but would leave Columbia for A&M Records shortly after the release of the album.

Following the re-recording of "Eight Miles High" in January 1966, and just prior to its release as a single in March of that year, the band's principal songwriter, Gene Clark, left the band. At the time, the official story regarding Clark's departure was that his fear of flying was preventing him from fulfilling his obligations with the group. However, it has become known in the years since then that there were other stress related factors at work, as well as resentment within the band that his songwriting income had made him the wealthiest member of the Byrds. While the songs "Eight Miles High" and "Captain Soul" featured the participation of Clark, the remaining nine tracks on the Fifth Dimension album were recorded without him.

== Music ==
The best known song on the album is the hit single "Eight Miles High", an early excursion into psychedelic rock. Musically, the song was a fusion of John Coltrane-influenced guitar playing—courtesy of lead guitarist Jim McGuinn—and raga-based musical structure and vocals, inspired by the Indian classical music of Ravi Shankar. Written mostly by Clark in November 1965, while the Byrds were on tour in the U.S., the song was pivotal in transmuting folk rock into the new musical forms of psychedelia and raga rock. Regardless of its innovative qualities, however, many radio stations in the U.S. banned the record, believing the title to be a reference to recreational drug use. Although the song's lyrics actually pertained to the approximate cruising altitude of commercial airliners, and the group's first visit to London during their 1965 English tour, both Clark and rhythm guitarist David Crosby later admitted that the song was at least partly inspired by their own drug use.

The album also included the McGuinn-penned songs "5D (Fifth Dimension)" and "Mr. Spaceman", with the latter being an early foray into country rock and a semi-serious meditation on the existence of alien life. In spite of its tongue-in-cheek lyrics, both McGuinn and Crosby were serious about the possibility of communicating with extraterrestrial lifeforms via the medium of radio broadcast. McGuinn in particular felt that if the song was played on radio there was a possibility that extraterrestrials might intercept the broadcasts and make contact. However, in later years McGuinn realized that this would've been impossible since AM radio waves disperse too rapidly in space.

"5D (Fifth Dimension)", on the other hand, was an abstract attempt to explain Einstein's theory of relativity, which was misconstrued by many as being a song about an LSD trip. In particular, Variety magazine targeted "5D (Fifth Dimension)" shortly after its release as a single, claiming that it was one of a recent spate of pop songs to include veiled drug references in its lyrics. This resulted in some radio stations in America refusing to play the song. The organ arrangement on "5D (Fifth Dimension)" was played by Van Dyke Parks.

McGuinn also penned the album's closing track, "2-4-2 Fox Trot (The Lear Jet Song)", which was an attempt to create an aural approximation of a flight in a Lear Jet. The song was inspired by the band's friendship with John Lear, son of jet manufacturer Bill Lear, and the title is a reference to the registration number of Lear's own personal jet, which was N242FT. The song makes extensive use of aviation sound effects, including an in-cockpit recitation of a pilot's pre-takeoff checklist and the sound of a jet engine starting up. While the song can be regarded as another of the Byrds' quirky album closers, like "Oh! Susannah" and "We'll Meet Again" from their previous albums, Crosby and McGuinn actually took the song very seriously, arguing that it was an innovative attempt at incorporating mechanical sounds into a pop song format.

One of Crosby's songwriting contributions to the album, "What's Happening?!?!", began his penchant for writing abstract songs asking irresoluble questions—a trend that continued throughout his career with Crosby, Stills & Nash and as a solo artist. During a 1966 interview, Crosby admitted that it was a strange song, noting, "It asks questions of what's going on here and who does it all belong to and why is it all going on. I just ask the questions because I really don't know the answers." Like "Eight Miles High", the song exhibits the strong influence of Indian classical music, with its droning guitar and melody. "What's Happening?!?!" is also notable for being the first song written solely by Crosby to appear on a Byrds' record.

Crosby and McGuinn also collaborated on the jazzy "I See You", which represented another example of abstract lyrics coupled with raga-influenced, psychedelic guitar solos. Author Johnny Rogan has commented that "I See You" was indicative of the Byrds' move away from the darkly-romantic songs of Clark towards material that examined psychological states. The album also includes the instrumental "Captain Soul", a song credited to all four band members that grew out of an in-studio jam of Lee Dorsey's "Get Out of My Life, Woman", and which features Clark playing harmonica.

The cover versions on Fifth Dimension include the Billy Roberts' song "Hey Joe (Where You Gonna Go)", which would enjoy a brief vogue during 1966, with notable versions of the song being recorded by Love, the Leaves, and the Jimi Hendrix Experience. The song was introduced to the Byrds by Crosby, who also sang lead vocals on their recording of it. Crosby, along with his friend Dino Valenti, had been instrumental in popularizing the song within the larger Los Angeles music community. Consequently, the guitarist had been wanting to record the song with the Byrds almost since the band had first formed in 1964, but the other members of the group had been unenthusiastic. During 1966, several other L.A. based bands enjoyed success with "Hey Joe", leaving Crosby angered by his bandmates' lack of faith in the song. Finally the other members of the Byrds acquiesced and allowed Crosby the chance to record the song during sessions for Fifth Dimension.

Another cover version on the album, "I Come and Stand at Every Door", has been called the most macabre song in the Byrds' oeuvre by biographer Johnny Rogan. The song's lyrics, which were adapted from a poem by Nâzım Hikmet, recount the story of a seven-year-old child who was killed in the atomic bombing of Hiroshima. The song describes how the child's spirit now walks the earth in search of peace in the nuclear age.

The two traditional folk songs included on the album, "John Riley" and "Wild Mountain Thyme", were both introduced to the band by McGuinn, who had learned them via recordings made by Joan Baez and Pete Seeger respectively. Writing for the AllMusic website, critic Richie Unterberger regarded both "John Riley" and "Wild Mountain Thyme" as "immaculate folk rock", praising the arrangements.

== Release and legacy ==
Fifth Dimension was released on July 18, 1966 in the United States (catalogue item CL 2549 in mono, CS 9349 in stereo) and September 22, 1966 in the UK (catalogue item BPG 62783 in mono, SBPG 62783 in stereo). It peaked at number 24 on the Billboard Top LPs chart, during a chart stay of 28 weeks, and reached number 27 in the United Kingdom. The album's front cover featured a photograph taken by the graphic design company Horn/Griner and also featured the first appearance of the Byrds' colorful psychedelic mosaic logo.

The preceding "Eight Miles High" single was released on March 14, 1966 in the U.S., and April 29, 1966 in the UK, reaching number 14 on the Billboard Hot 100 and number 24 on the UK Singles Chart. A second single, "5D (Fifth Dimension)", was released on June 13, 1966 in America and July 29, 1966 in the UK, peaking at number 44 on the Billboard Hot 100, but failing to chart in the UK. A third single taken from the album, "Mr. Spaceman", was issued on September 6, 1966 and reached number 36 on the Billboard Hot 100, but it too failed to chart in the UK.

=== Contemporary reception ===
Upon its release, contemporary critical reaction to Fifth Dimension was somewhat tepid, although Hit Parader described it as "the third and best album from the Byrds". The Hit Parader review also made reference to the recent controversy surrounding the album's two preceding singles by suggesting, "If your friendly neighborhood radio station banned 'Eight Miles High' and '5D' you can listen to them here and discover that there's nothing suggestive about them. The only danger in this album is that it might addict you to groovy music."

Journalist Jon Landau, writing in Crawdaddy!, was less complimentary about the album and cited the departure of Gene Clark as a contributing factor in its artistic failure. Landau concluded by saying that the album "cannot be considered up to the standards set by the Byrds' first two and basically demonstrates that they should be thinking in terms of replacing Gene Clark instead of just trying to carry on without him." In the UK, Disc magazine was also critical, bemoaning a lack of energy in the album's contents and commenting: "Here then are those Byrds with the fresh eager exciting music sounding like tired and disillusioned old men looking back on the happy days. This is a sad sound indeed."

=== Modern reception ===
Professional ratings
Review scores
Source	Rating
AllMusic	4.5/5 stars
Blender	4/5 stars
Encyclopedia of Popular Music	5/5 stars
Entertainment Weekly	B
Melody Maker	"Recommended"
MusicHound	3/5
NME	8/10
Q	4/5 stars
The Rolling Stone Album Guide	4.5/5 stars

In more recent years, Richie Unterberger, writing for the AllMusic website, has described Fifth Dimension as "wildly uneven", noting that the album's short-comings prevent it "from attaining truly classic status". Despite its inconsistency, Fifth Dimension is today regarded as a highly influential, albeit transitional, album that is musically more experimental than the band's previous recorded output. A reviewer for Entertainment Weekly wrote in 1996 that "time hasn't enhanced the group's forays into psychedelia", yet the album contains "enough keepers to make you forgive their occasional tendency to fly into walls". That same year, the NME described it as "faultless" and a work that "heralds a newly psychedelic Byrds hung up on the archetypal acid-fixation with the unknown".

Barney Hoskyns of Mojo magazine was less impressed and deemed Fifth Dimension to be a "breakthrough" work, but also one that "can't quite decide what sort of album it is". Hoskins elaborated: "Torn between the past and the future, it picks randomly from a smorgasbord of country rock ('Mr. Spaceman'), garage punk ('Hey Joe'), instrumental R&B ('Captain Soul'), folk standards ('Wild Mountain Thyme', the lovely 'John Riley'), and rallying calls to the emerging hippy youth ('What's Happening?!?!'). 'Patchy' isn't close to describing it." In 2004, Rolling Stone called it "the Byrds' most underrated album" and especially admired "Eight Miles High" as "the band's highest of highs, blending Coltrane-influenced 12-string squiggles with eerie harmonies for a truly hypnotic sound".

Author Christopher Hjort has commented that Fifth Dimension can be seen as a testament to the rapidity with which pop music was evolving during the mid-1960s. Like its predecessor, Turn! Turn! Turn!, the album was made under trying circumstances, with the band scrambling to compensate for the loss of their main songwriter in the wake of Clark's departure. This resulted in an uneven album that included a total of four cover versions and an instrumental. However, Fifth Dimension actually contained fewer covers than either of their Clark-era albums, as well as an absence of songs by Bob Dylan, whose material, along with Clark's, had dominated earlier Byrds releases.

In his 2003 book Eight Miles High: Folk-Rock's Flight from Haight-Ashbury to Woodstock, Unterberger regards the album as a pivotal moment in establishing the Byrds' status within the emerging counterculture. The author goes on to say that the album is a continuation of their folk rock sound, but clearly establishes the break away from "folk-rock into folk-rock-psychedelia". He also notes the album's influence on the Byrds' contemporaries.

The album was included in Robert Dimery's book 1001 Albums You Must Hear Before You Die. It was voted number 290 in Colin Larkin's All Time Top 1000 Albums 3rd Edition (2000). In 2003, David Keenan included Fifth Dimension in his The Best Albums Ever...Honest from the Scottish Sunday Herald.

=== CD reissues and Another Dimension ===
Fifth Dimension was remastered at 20-bit resolution and partially remixed as part of the Columbia/Legacy Byrds series. It was reissued in an expanded form on April 30, 1996, with six bonus tracks, including the RCA versions of "Why" and "Eight Miles High". The final track on the CD extends to include a hidden promotional radio interview with McGuinn and Crosby, dating from 1966. The interview is open-ended and formatted with gaps between the group's answers, whereby a disc jockey could insert himself asking scripted questions, giving the illusion that the Byrds were being interviewed in person.

On April 26, 2005, Sundazed Music issued a compilation of outtakes from the Fifth Dimension recording sessions, titled Another Dimension.

== Track listing ==
Side one

1. "5D (Fifth Dimension)" (Jim McGuinn) – 2:33
2. "Wild Mountain Thyme" (traditional, arranged Jim McGuinn, Chris Hillman, Michael Clarke, David Crosby) – 2:30
3. "Mr. Spaceman" (Jim McGuinn) – 2:09
4. "I See You" (Jim McGuinn, David Crosby) – 2:38
5. "What's Happening?!?!" (David Crosby) – 2:35
6. "I Come and Stand at Every Door" (Nâzım Hikmet) – 3:03

Side two

1. "Eight Miles High" (Gene Clark, Jim McGuinn, David Crosby) – 3:34
2. "Hey Joe (Where You Gonna Go)" (Billy Roberts) – 2:17
3. "Captain Soul" (Jim McGuinn, Chris Hillman, Michael Clarke, David Crosby) – 2:53
4. "John Riley" (traditional, arranged Jim McGuinn, Chris Hillman, Michael Clarke, David Crosby) – 2:57
5. "2-4-2 Fox Trot (The Lear Jet Song)" (Jim McGuinn) – 2:12

1996 CD reissue bonus tracks

12. "Why" [Single Version] (Jim McGuinn, David Crosby) – 2:59
13. "I Know My Rider (I Know You Rider)" (traditional, arranged Jim McGuinn, Gene Clark, David Crosby) – 2:43
14. "Psychodrama City" (David Crosby) – 3:23
15. "Eight Miles High" [Alternate RCA Version] (Gene Clark, Jim McGuinn, David Crosby) – 3:19
16. "Why" [Alternate RCA Version] (Jim McGuinn, David Crosby) – 2:40
17. "John Riley" [Instrumental] (traditional, arranged Jim McGuinn, Chris Hillman, Michael Clarke, David Crosby) – 16:53

Notes

- The album erroneously credits "John Riley" to Bob Gibson and Ricky Neff.
- The instrumental version of "John Riley" ends at 3:10; at 3:20 begins "Byrds Promotional Radio Interview"

== Personnel ==
Adapted from So You Want To Be A Rock 'n' Roll Star: The Byrds Day-By-Day (1965–1973) and the compact disc liner notes.

Credits include bonus tracks on CD and digital releases of the album.

The Byrds

- Jim McGuinn – lead guitar, vocals
- David Crosby – rhythm guitar, vocals
- Chris Hillman – electric bass, vocals
- Michael Clarke – drums
- Gene Clark – vocals, tambourine (on "Eight Miles High" and "Why" [both single and alternate RCA versions]); harmonica (on "Captain Soul")

Additional personnel

- Van Dyke Parks – organ (on "5D (Fifth Dimension)")
- Allen Stanton – string section arrangement (on "Wild Mountain Thyme" and "John Riley")

== Release history ==
Date	Label	Format	Country	Catalog	Notes
July 18, 1966	Columbia	LP	US	CL 2549	Original mono release.
July 18, 1966	Columbia	LP	US	CS 9349	Original stereo release.
September 22, 1966	CBS	LP	UK	BPG 62783	Original mono release.
September 22, 1966	CBS	LP	UK	SBPG 62783	Original stereo release.
1989	Columbia	CD	US	CK 9349	Original CD release.
1991	BGO	LP	UK	BGOLP 106	
1991	BGO	CD	UK	BGOCD 106	
1993	Columbia	CD	UK	COL 567069	
April 30, 1996	Columbia/Legacy	CD	US	CK 64847	Reissue containing six bonus tracks and a partially remixed version of the stereo album.
May 6, 1996	Columbia/Legacy	CD	UK	COL 4837072	Reissue containing six bonus tracks and a partially remixed version of the stereo album.
1999	Sundazed	LP	US	LP 5059	Reissue of the partially remixed stereo album with two bonus tracks.
1999	Simply Vinyl	LP	UK	SVLP 0047	Reissue of the partially remixed stereo album.
2003	Sony	CD	Japan	MHCP-68	Reissue containing six bonus tracks and the partially remixed stereo album in a replica LP sleeve.
2006	Sundazed	LP	US	LP 5199	Reissue of the original mono release.

=== Remix information ===
Fifth Dimension was one of four Byrds albums that were remixed as part of their re-release on Columbia/Legacy. However, unlike Mr. Tambourine Man and Turn! Turn! Turn!, which were remixed extensively, only a third of Fifth Dimension was remixed, although it is unknown exactly which tracks received this treatment. The reason for these remixes was explained by Bob Irwin (who produced these re-issues for compact disc) during an interview:

The first four Byrds albums had sold so well, and the master tapes used so much that they were at least two, if not three generations down from the original. In most cases, a first-generation master no longer existed. They were basically played to death; they were worn out, there was nothing left of them.

He further stated:

Each album is taken from the original multi-tracks, where they exist, which is in 95% of the cases. We remixed them exactly as they were, without taking any liberties, except for the occasional song appearing in stereo for the first time.

Many fans enjoy the partially remixed album because it is very close to the original mix in most cases and offers noticeably better sound quality.
