= Harihar Rao =

American academic

Harihar Rao (January 21, 1927 – January 13, 2013) was an Indian-born American musician, noted for playing tabla and sitar.

He was born into a prominent musical family in Mangalore, India. He moved to the United States in 1964, residing in Pasadena, California. Rao was a Fulbright Scholar at UCLA., He worked in the ethnomusicology department at UCLA and privately taught and mentored students of the sitar.

Rao explored a variety of fusions of Indian and western music. His Hindustani Jazz Sextet, which included the trumpeter Don Ellis, combined classical Indian rhythms and jazz forms. In 1965 Rao and Ellis co-wrote An Introduction to Indian Music for the Jazz Musician, which was printed by Jazz Magazine. The 1966 album Raga Rock combined Rao's sitar playing with the Folkswingers' western instruments to cover popular rock songs, such as "Paint It Black" and "Norwegian Wood". In 1967, Rao published the book Introduction to Sitar, which sold more than 500 copies in its first two weeks of publication, and ultimately thousands of copies in four printings. Rao was the longest-standing protégé and a close friend for more than six decades of sitar player Ravi Shankar. Rao and Shankar co-founded the Music Circle, an organization dedicated to promoting Indian classical music. He served as the artistic director of the Music Circle for 40 years.

He became a U.S. citizen in 1969. Rao attended a number of colleges and universities in southern California, including UCLA, Cal State Long Beach, Cal State Los Angeles, California Institute of the Arts, and Caltech.

== Bibliography ==
- Rao, Harihar (1967). Introduction to Sitar. Peer International.
- Rao, Harihar; Don Ellis (April 1965). "An Introduction to Indian Music for the Jazz Musician". Jazz magazine.

== Additional references ==
- "Peer Southern Increases Indian Music Collection". Billboard 81 (15): 44. April 12, 1969. Retrieved Aug 11 2011.
- "About the Music Circle". The Music Circle. Retrieved Aug 11 2011.
- Fenlon, Sean (2002). The Exotic Rhythms of Don Ellis. Baltimore, MD: The Peabody Institute of the Johns Hopkins University. pp. 6.
