= Gordon Lightfoot discography =

Cataloging of published recordings by Gordon Lightfoot

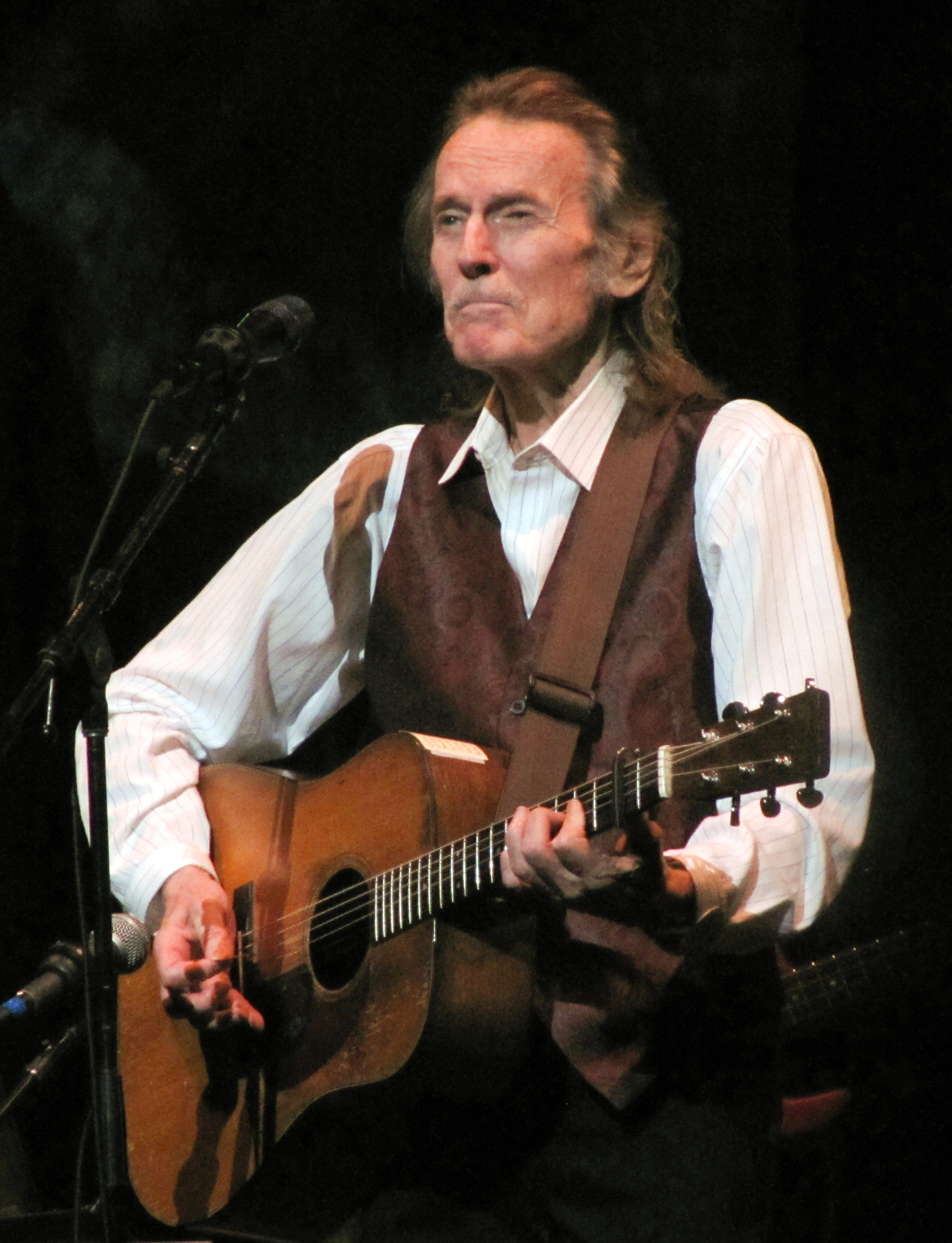
- Lightfoot performing at Interlochen, Michigan, in 2009
- Studio albums: 20
- Live albums: 3
- Compilation albums: 19
- Tribute albums: 3
- Singles: 47
- B-sides: 3
- Video albums: 5

The discography of Canadian folk and country music singer-songwriter Gordon Lightfoot consists of 20 studio albums, three live albums, 16 greatest hits albums and 46 singles. Lightfoot's songs, including "For Lovin' Me", "Early Morning Rain", "Steel Rail Blues", "Ribbon of Darkness"—a number one hit on the U.S. country chart with Marty Robbins's cover in 1965—and "Black Day in July" about the 1967 Detroit riot, brought him wide recognition in the 1960s. Canadian chart success with his own recordings began in 1962 with the No. 3 hit "(Remember Me) I'm the One", followed by recognition and charting abroad in the 1970s.

He topped the US Hot 100 and/or AC chart with the hits such as "If You Could Read My Mind" (1970), "Sundown" (1974); "Carefree Highway" (1974), "Rainy Day People" (1975), and "The Wreck of the Edmund Fitzgerald" (1976), and had many other hits that appeared within the top 40. Several of his albums achieved gold and multi-platinum status internationally.

== Studio albums ==
=== 1960s ===
Title	Details	Peak positions
Title	Details	CAN
Lightfoot!	Release date: January 1966; Label: United Artists Records	—
The Way I Feel	Release date: April 1967; Label: United Artists Records	—
Did She Mention My Name?	Release date: January 1968; Label: United Artists Records	21
Back Here on Earth	Release date: November 1968; Label: United Artists Records	21
"—" denotes releases that did not chart

=== 1970s ===
Title	Details	Peak chart positions					Certifications (sales threshold)
Title	Details	CAN	AUS	US	US Country	UK	Certifications (sales threshold)
Sit Down Young Stranger (Note: Sit Down Young Stranger was re-released as If You Could Read My Mind in 1971.)	Release date: April 1970; Label: Reprise Records	12	20	12	—	—	US: Gold; AUS: Gold
Summer Side of Life	Release date: May 1971; Label: Reprise Records	3	40	38	—	—	
Don Quixote	Release date: February 1972; Label: Reprise Records	1	—	42	—	44	
Old Dan's Records	Release date: November 1972; Label: Reprise Records	1	—	95	—	—	
Sundown	Release date: January 1974; Label: Reprise Records	1	13	1	—	45	US: Platinum; AUS: Gold
Cold on the Shoulder	Release date: February 1975; Label: Reprise Records	3	44	10	—	—	
Summertime Dream	Release date: June 1976; Label: Reprise Records	1	63	12	—	—	CAN: Platinum; US: Platinum
Endless Wire	Release date: January 1978; Label: Warner Bros. Records	2	56	22	14	—	US: Gold
"—" denotes releases that did not chart

=== 1980s ===
Title	Details	Peak chart positions					Certifications (sales threshold)
Title	Details	CAN	CAN Country	AUS	US	US Country	Certifications (sales threshold)
Dream Street Rose	Release date: 1980; Label: Warner Bros. Records	9	1	76	60	58	
Shadows	Release date: January 1982; Label: Warner Bros. Records	16	—	—	87	—	
Salute	Release date: July 1983; Label: Warner Bros. Records	59	—	—	175	—	
East of Midnight	Release date: July 1986; Label: Warner Bros. Records	37	—	—	165	—	CAN: Gold
"—" denotes releases that did not chart

=== 1990s–2020s ===
Title	Details	Peak chart positions	
Title	Details	CAN	US Indie
Waiting for You	Release date: April 13, 1993; Label: Reprise Records	24	—
A Painter Passing Through	Release date: May 1, 1998; Label: Reprise Records	92	—
Harmony	Release date: May 11, 2004; Label: Linus Entertainment	13	35
Solo	Release date: March 20, 2020; Label: Rhino Entertainment	—	—
"—" denotes releases that did not chart

== Live albums ==
Title	Details	Peak chart positions	
Title	Details	CAN	US
Two Tones at the Village Corner	Release date: 1962; Label: LMG Records	—	—
Sunday Concert	Release date: 1969; Label: United Artists Records	21	143
Live at PBS Soundstage 1979	Release date: September 8, 1979	—	—
All Live	Release date: April 17, 2012; Label: Rhino Entertainment	16	—
At Royal Albert Hall	Release date: July 14, 2023; Label: Linus Entertainment	—	—
"—" denotes releases that did not chart

== Compilation albums ==
Title	Details	Peak chart positions			Certifications (sales threshold)
Title	Details	CAN	US	US Country	Certifications (sales threshold)
Early Lightfoot (Note: Early Lightfoot is technically not a compilation album, but an album of 10 original songs that Lightfoot recorded for AME in 1962.)	Release date: 1971; Label: AME Records	69	—	—	
The Best of Gordon Lightfoot	Release date: 1970; Label: United Artists Records	—	—	—	
Classic Lightfoot: The Best of Gordon Lightfoot, Vol. 2	Release date: 1971; Label: United Artists Records	41	178	—	
A Lightfoot Collection: The Best of Gordon Lightfoot, Vol. 3	Release date: 1972; Label: United Artists Records	—	—	—	
The Very Best of Gordon Lightfoot	Release date: 1974; Label: United Artists Records	—	155	—	
The Very Best of Gordon Lightfoot, Vol. 2	Release date: 1975; Label: United Artists Records	—	—	—	
Gord's Gold	Release date: November 1975; Label: Reprise Records	6	34	15	CAN: 2× Platinum; UK: Silver; US: 2× Platinum
Early Morning Rain	Release date: 1976; Label: EMI	—	—	—	
The First Time Ever I Saw Your Face	Release date: 1979; Label: Pickwick International, Ltd.	—	—	—	
Songbook	Release date: 1985; Label: Pair Records	—	—	—	
Gord's Gold, Vol. 2	Release date: 1988; Label: Reprise Records	—	—	—	CAN: Platinum; US: Gold
The Best of Gordon Lightfoot	Release date: 1989; Label: Curb Records	—	—	—	
If You Could Read My Mind	Release date: 1990; Label: Reprise Records	—	—	—	
The Original Lightfoot	Release date: 1992; Label: United Artists Records	58	—	—	
The United Artists Collection	Release date: 1993; Label: United Artists Records	—	—	—	
Songbook	Release date: June 15, 1999; Label: Rhino Entertainment	—	—	—	
Complete Greatest Hits	Release date: 2002; Label: Rhino Entertainment	21	128	—	CAN: Gold; US: Gold
An Introduction to: Gordon Lightfoot	Release date: 2018; Label: Rhino Entertainment	—	—	—	
The Complete Singles 1970–1980 (2 CD)	Release date: 2019; Label: Real Gone Music	—	—	—	
"—" denotes releases that did not chart

== Tribute albums ==
Title	Artist	Details
Tony Rice Sings Gordon Lightfoot	Tony Rice	Release date: 1996^{[C]}; Label: Rounder
Mac Wiseman Sings Gordon Lightfoot	Mac Wiseman	Release date: 1977; Label: CMH Records
Beautiful: A Tribute to Gordon Lightfoot	Various Artists	Release date: 2003; Label: Borealis Records
The Long River: A Personal Tribute to Gordon Lightfoot	J.P. Cormier	Release date: 2005; Label: (no label)
Ladies Sing Lightfoot	Various artists^{[D]}	Release date: October 1, 2021; Label: Have Harmony Will Travel

- C Tony Rice Sings Gordon Lightfoot is a compilation of Lightfoot songs recorded by Tony Rice on a number of albums.
- D Ladies Sing Lightfoot features 14 newly recorded performances by Darling West, the Kennedys, Natalie Noone, Shawn Barton Vach, Arwen Lewis, the Textones, Susan Coswill, Ilsey Juber, Katy Moffatt, Sarah Kramer, Kristi Callan, Shayna Adler and Carla Olson.

== Singles ==
=== 1960s ===
Year	Title	Peak chart positions			Album
Year	Title	CAN CHUM	CAN RPM	CAN Country	Album
1962	"(Remember Me) I'm the One" (Note: Credited to Gord Lightfoot. Canada did not have a national singles chart at the time of release—these chart figures are from Toronto's CHUM Chart. All other Canadian chart figures from RPM magazine.)	3	—	—	Non-LP singles
1962	"It's Too Late, He Wins" / "Negotiations"	27; 27	— —	— —	Non-LP singles
1963	"I'll Meet You In Michoacan" (a.k.a. "Adios, Adios")	—	—	—	Non-LP singles
1963	"Day Before Yesterday"	—	—	—	Non-LP singles
1965	"I'm Not Sayin'"	17	12	2	Lightfoot!
1965	"Ribbon of Darkness" / "Just Like Tom Thumb's Blues"	— 8	— 3	— —	A-side: Lightfoot! B-side: Non-LP
1966	"Spin Spin"	6	7	—	Non-LP single
1966	"Go-Go Round"	6	27	—	The Way I Feel
1967	"The Way I Feel"	21	36	—	The Way I Feel
1968	"Black Day in July"	17	68	—	Did She Mention My Name?
1968	"Bitter Green"	—	44	—	Back Here on Earth
1969	"The Circle Is Small" (U.K. release only)	—	—	—	Back Here on Earth
"—" denotes releases that did not chart

=== 1970s ===
Year	Title	Peak chart positions								Certifications (sales threshold)	Album
Year	Title	CAN	CAN AC	CAN Country	US	US AC	US Country	UK	AUS	Certifications (sales threshold)	Album
1970	"Me and Bobby McGee"	13	—	1	—	—	—	—	—		Sit Down Young Stranger
1970	"Approaching Lavender"	—	20	—	—	—	—	—	—		Sit Down Young Stranger
1970	"If You Could Read My Mind"	1	1	—	5	1	—	30	27	UK: Gold	Sit Down Young Stranger
1971	"This Is My Song"	66	—	—	—	—	—	—	—		Early Lightfoot
1971	"If I Could"	—	—	—	—	—	—	—	—		Back Here on Earth
1971	"Talking in Your Sleep"	19	2	—	64	11	—	—	—		Summer Side of Life
1971	"Summer Side of Life"	21	4	—	98	—	—	—	—		Summer Side of Life
1972	"Beautiful"	13	1	—	58	30	—	—	—		Don Quixote
1972	"Alberta Bound"	—	—	—	—	—	—	—	—		Don Quixote
1972	"You Are What I Am"	3	1	1	—	32	—	—	37		Old Dan's Records
1973	"Can't Depend on Love"	27	—	—	—	—	—	—	—		Old Dan's Records
1974	"Sundown"	1	2	4	1	1	13	33	4	US: Gold	Sundown
1974	"Carefree Highway"	11	1	1	10	1	81	—	74		Sundown
1975	"Rainy Day People"	10	1	—	26	1	47	—	—		Cold on the Shoulder
1976	"The Wreck of the Edmund Fitzgerald"	1	1	1	2	9	50	40	46		Summertime Dream
1976	"Race Among the Ruins"	30	11	14	65	13	—	—	—		Summertime Dream
1977	"The Circle Is Small (I Can See It in Your Eyes)"	6	1	9	33	3	92	—	—		Endless Wire
1978	"Daylight Katy"	44	25	—	—	16	—	41	—		Endless Wire
1978	"Dreamland"	—	24	—	—	—	100	—	—		Endless Wire
"—" denotes releases that did not chart

=== 1980s ===
Year	Title	Peak chart positions						Album
Year	Title	CAN	CAN AC	CAN Country	US	US AC	US Country	Album
1980	"Dream Street Rose"	—	1	8	—	25	80	Dream Street Rose
1980	"If You Need Me"	—	5	21	—	—	—	Dream Street Rose
1982	"Baby Step Back"	—	6	—	50	17	—	Shadows
1982	"Blackberry Wine"	—	15	—	—	—	—	Shadows
1982	"In My Fashion"	—	—	—	—	—	—	Shadows
1983	"Salute (A Lot More Livin' to Do)"	—	—	—	—	—	—	Salute
1983	"Without You"	—	—	—	—	—	—	Salute
1986	"Anything for Love"	39	14	—	—	13	71	East of Midnight
1986	"Stay Loose"	86	10	—	—	—	—	East of Midnight
1987	"East of Midnight"	—	11	—	—	—	—	East of Midnight
1987	"Ecstasy Made Easy"	—	—	—	—	—	—	East of Midnight
"—" denotes releases that did not chart

=== 1990s–2010s ===
Year	Title	Peak positions	Album
Year	Title	CAN AC	Album
1993	"I'll Prove My Love"	—	Waiting for You
1993	"Waiting for You"	—	Waiting for You
1998	"A Painter Passing Through"	47	A Painter Passing Through
2004	"Inspiration Lady"	—	Harmony
2016	"Plans of My Own"	—	
"—" denotes releases that did not chart

== Charted B-sides ==
Year	Title	Peak chart positions				Original A-side
Year	Title	CAN	CAN AC	CAN Country	US	Original A-side
1965	"Just Like Tom Thumb's Blues"	3	9	—	—	"Ribbon of Darkness"
1972	"That Same Old Obsession"	3	1	—	101	"You Are What I Am"
1973	"It's Worth Believin'"	—	—	12	—	"Can't Depend on Love"
"—" denotes releases that did not chart

== Music videos ==
Year	Album	Video
2004	Harmony	"Inspiration Lady"
1982	Shadows	"Shadows"
1982	Shadows	"Baby Step Back"
1982	Shadows	"In My Fashion"
1982	Shadows	"Blackberry Wine"

== Video albums and documentaries ==
- Tears Are Not Enough (w/ Northern Lights) (1985)
- Live in Reno (2000)
- Greatest Hits Live (2003)
- Gordon Lightfoot: If You Could Read My Mind (2019)
- Lightheaded (2022)
