= Gord's Gold =

- CD cover. The vinyl issue does not include the headline.

Greatest hits album by Gordon Lightfoot
- Released: November 1975
- Recorded: September 1969–July 1975, various studios
- Genres: Folk, folk rock, country folk
- Length: 73:43
- Label: Reprise
- Producers: Lenny Waronker & Joe Wissert

Professional ratings
Review scores
Source	Rating
Allmusic	3.5/5 stars

Gord's Gold is a compilation album released by Canadian singer-songwriter Gordon Lightfoot in 1975. Originally a vinyl double album, it was reissued on CD in 1987 with one track, "Affair on 8th Avenue", omitted to allow the collection to fit onto a single disc. However, the track is included for digital downloads.

The first Lightfoot compilation to feature music from his 1970s Reprise Records albums, Gord's Gold also includes re-recorded versions of several songs from his 1960s United Artists output (Sides 1 and 2). Lightfoot's reasons for re-recording the United Artists tracks were explained in the liner notes as being because "he doesn't like listening to his early work".

Despite covering only the first decade of his career (and lacking one of his biggest hit singles, "The Wreck of the Edmund Fitzgerald", which was recorded at the end of the year), Gord's Gold has remained the most commercially popular Lightfoot compilation. Of note, a stereo mix of the mono DJ 45 of "If You Could Read My Mind" (with double-tracked vocals not on the album version) appears here. In 1988 Lightfoot released a second volume, Gord's Gold, Vol. 2, which also featured re-recordings of earlier hits.

== Track listing ==
All tracks written by Gordon Lightfoot; all tracks produced by Lenny Waronker, except where noted.

Side 1
No.	Title	Original album of original version	Length
1.	"I'm Not Sayin'/Ribbon of Darkness" (re-recording)	Lightfoot!, 1966 (Both songs)	3:06
2.	"Song for a Winter's Night" (re-recording)	The Way I Feel, 1967	3:02
3.	"Canadian Railroad Trilogy" (re-recording)	The Way I Feel	7:05
4.	"Softly" (re-recording)	The Way I Feel	2:39
5.	"For Lovin' Me/Did She Mention My Name" (re-recording)	Lightfoot! / Did She Mention My Name?, 1968	3:29

Side 2
No.	Title	Original album of original version	Length
1.	"Affair on 8th Avenue" (re-recording)	Back Here on Earth, 1968	3:45
2.	"Steel Rail Blues" (re-recording)	Lightfoot!	2:49
3.	"Wherefore and Why" (re-recording)	Did She Mention My Name?	2:48
4.	"Bitter Green" (re-recording)	Back Here on Earth	2:46
5.	"Early Morning Rain" (re-recording)	Lightfoot!	3:18

Side 3
No.	Title	Original album	Length
1.	"Minstrel of the Dawn" (Waronker and Joe Wissert)	Sit Down Young Stranger, 1970	3:27
2.	"Sundown"	Sundown, 1974	3:36
3.	"Beautiful"	Don Quixote, 1972	3:32
4.	"Summer Side of Life" (Wissert)	Summer Side of Life, 1971	4:05
5.	"Rainy Day People"	Cold on the Shoulder, 1975	2:49
6.	"Cotton Jenny" (Wissert)	Summer Side of Life	3:26

Side 4
No.	Title	Original album	Length
1.	"Don Quixote"	Don Quixote	3:40
2.	"Circle of Steel"	Sundown	2:48
3.	"Old Dan's Records"	Old Dan's Records, 1972	3:05
4.	"If You Could Read My Mind" (Waronker and Wissert)	Sit Down Young Stranger	3:49
5.	"Cold on the Shoulder"	Cold on the Shoulder	3:01
6.	"Carefree Highway"	Sundown	3:41

Notes

- "Affair on 8th Avenue" is excluded in the CD release but is included with the digital download.

== Personnel ==
- Guitar: Gordon Lightfoot, Red Shea, Terry Clements
- Bass: Rick Haynes, John Stockfish
- Steel Guitar: Pee Wee Charles (aka Ed Ringwald)
- Drums: Jim Gordon, Barry Keane
- String arrangements: Nick DeCaro and Lee Holdridge

== Charts ==
Chart performance for Gord's Gold
Chart (1976)	Peak position
Canada Top Albums/CDs (RPM)	6

Chart performance for Gord's Gold
Chart (2023)	Peak position
Canadian Albums (Billboard)	6

== Certifications ==
Region	Certification	Certified units/sales
Canada (Music Canada)	2× Platinum	200,000^{^}
United Kingdom (BPI)	Silver	60,000^{^}
United States (RIAA)	2× Platinum	2,000,000^{^}
^{^} Shipments figures based on certification alone.
