= Songbook (Gordon Lightfoot album) =

1999 box set by Gordon Lightfoot

Box set by Gordon Lightfoot
- Released: June 15, 1999
- Recorded: 1962–1998
- Genre: Folk, soft rock
- Length: 302:03
- Label: Rhino
- Producer: Gordon Lightfoot, Elliot Mazer, John Simon, Russ Titelman, Lenny Waronker, Joseph Wissert, Patrick Milligan, Thane Leith George Tierney

Professional ratings
Review scores
Source	Rating
Allmusic	4.5/5 stars

Songbook is a career retrospective album released by Canadian singer Gordon Lightfoot on the Rhino label in 1999. The album contains 88 songs on four CDs covering Lightfoot's career, and includes 16 previously unreleased tracks. The only material not covered are the albums Harmony and Solo, which were released after Songbook.

== Track listing ==
All compositions by Gordon Lightfoot.

=== Disc 1 ===
1. (Remember Me) I'm the One**
2. It's Too Late, He Wins**
3. For Lovin' Me
4. Early Morning Rain
5. The Way I Feel
6. Steel Rail Blues
7. A Message to the Wind*
8. Song For a Winter's Night
9. Canadian Railroad Trilogy
10. Go-Go Round
11. Crossroads
12. You'll Still Be Needing Me*
13. The Mountains And Maryann
14. The Last Time I Saw Her
15. Did She Mention My Name
16. Pussywillows Cat-Tails
17. Boss Man
18. Something Very Special
19. Bitter Green
20. Affair on Eighth Avenue
21. I'm Not Sayin'/Ribbon of Darkness
22. Softly
23. Mama Said*
24. Station Master*

=== Disc 2 ===
1. Sit Down Young Stranger
2. If You Could Read My Mind
3. Poor Little Allison
4. The Pony Man
5. Cobwebs And Dust
6. Too Much to Lose*
7. Summer Side of Life
8. Cotton Jenny
9. Ten Degrees And Getting Colder
10. Nous Vivons Ensemble
11. Same Old Loverman
12. Heaven Don't Deserve Me*
13. Don Quixote
14. Alberta Bound
15. Beautiful
16. Ode to Big Blue
17. Stone Cold Sober*
18. Old Dan's Records
19. That Same Old Obsession
20. Lazy Morning
21. Hi'way Songs
22. Can't Depend on Love

=== Disc 3 ===
1. Sundown
2. Carefree Highway
3. Seven Island Suite
4. Borderstone*
5. Cold on the Shoulder
6. Now and Then
7. Rainy Day People
8. Fine as Fine Can Be
9. All the Lovely Ladies
10. Summertime Dream
11. The Wreck of the Edmund Fitzgerald
12. Never Too Close
13. Betty Called Me In*
14. Endless Wire
15. The Circle is Small
16. Sea of Tranquility
17. Make Way For the Lady
18. Dream Street Rose
19. Ghosts of Cape Horn
20. Keepin' On Yearnin'*
21. Canary Yellow Canoe*

=== Disc 4 ===
1. Shadows
2. She's Not the Same
3. 14 Karat Gold
4. Baby Step Back
5. In My Fashion
6. Never Say Trust Me*
7. Why Should I Feel Blue*
8. Someone to Believe In
9. Romance
10. Broken Dreams
11. Always on the Bright Side*
12. Forgive Me Lord*
13. Lifeline*
14. East of Midnight
15. Morning Glory
16. A Lesson In Love
17. A Passing Ship
18. Waiting For You
19. Drink Yer Glasses Empty
20. I'll Prove My Love
21. A Painter Passing Through

*Indicates previously unreleased track. **Indicates a track that was previously only available on a 45 RPM vinyl single.
