= Gord's Gold Volume II =

Greatest hits album by Gordon Lightfoot
- Released: October 11, 1988
- Recorded: Various
- Genres: Folk, Adult contemporary, Country folk
- Length: 64:38
- Label: Warner Bros.
- Producer: Various

Professional ratings
Review scores
Source	Rating
Allmusic	2/5 stars

Gord's Gold Volume II is a compilation album released by Canadian singer Gordon Lightfoot in 1988.

Like the first Gord's Gold collection, Volume II features re-recordings of earlier hits alongside the contemporary material. On Gord's Gold only the early songs that didn't match Lightfoot's 1970s sound (and whose original masters were owned by Lightfoot's former label, United Artists) were re-recorded. However, on Volume II all tracks, apart from "Make Way (For the Lady)," "Ghosts of Cape Horn," Baby Step Back," and "It's Worth Believin'" were re-recorded.

"Ghosts of Cape Horn" and "It's Worth Believin'" did not appear on the vinyl release.

== Track listing ==
All compositions by Lightfoot:
(† Re-recording / ‡ New song)

1. "If It Should Please You"‡ – 2:50
2. "Endless Wire"† – 4:14 (Original version from Endless Wire)
3. "Hangdog Hotel Room"† – 2:47 (Original version from Endless Wire)
4. "I'm Not Supposed To Care"† – 3:18 (Original version from Summertime Dream)
5. "High and Dry"† – 2:26 (Original version from Sundown)
6. "The Wreck of the Edmund Fitzgerald"† – 6:14 (Original version from Summertime Dream)
7. "The Pony Man"† – 3:33 (Original version from Sit Down Young Stranger)
8. "Race Among the Ruins"† – 3:23 (Original version from Summertime Dream)
9. "Christian Island"† – 3:12 (Original version from Don Quixote)
10. "All the Lovely Ladies"† – 2:48 (Original version from Cold on the Shoulder)
11. "Alberta Bound"† – 2:58 (Original version from Don Quixote)
12. "Cherokee Bend"† – 4:57 (Original version from Cold on the Shoulder)
13. "Triangle"† – 3:53 (Original version from Shadows)
14. "Shadows"† – 2:59 (Original version from Shadows)
15. "Make Way (For the Lady)" – 3:40 (from Dream Street Rose)
16. "Ghosts of Cape Horn" – 4:06 (from Dream Street Rose)
17. "Baby Step Back" – 3:55 (from Shadows)
18. "It's Worth Believin'" – 3:25 (from Old Dan's Records)

== Session personnel ==
- Guitar: Gordon Lightfoot, Terry Clements, Red Shea, Dean Parks
- Bass: Rick Haynes, Tom Szczesniak
- Steel Guitar: Pee Wee Charles
- Piano: Mike Heffernan, Michael Omartian
- Drums: Barry Keane
- Strings: Nick DeCaro

== Certifications ==
Region	Certification	Certified units/sales
Canada (Music Canada)	Platinum	100,000^{^}
United States (RIAA)	Gold	500,000^{^}
^{^} Shipments figures based on certification alone.
