= All Live =

Live album by Gordon Lightfoot
- Released: April 17, 2012
- Recorded: 1998–2001
- Venues: Massey Hall Toronto, Ontario, Canada
- Genres: Folk, Pop/Rock
- Length: 69:14
- Label: Rhino
- Producer: Gordon Lightfoot

Gordon Lightfoot chronology
Harmony (2004)	All Live (2012)	Solo (2020)

Professional ratings
Review scores
Source	Rating
allmusic	3/5 stars

All Live is a live album by Gordon Lightfoot, It was recorded at the historic Massey Hall. The album was released on April 17, 2012, through Rhino Records. It is a collection of live concert recordings that span 1998 to 2001; all of the recordings are in untouched condition (directly from the mixing board), and include music from Lightfoot's entire career.

== Track listing ==
All tracks composed by Gordon Lightfoot

1. "14 Karat Gold"
2. "If You Could Read My Mind"
3. "Fine as Fine Can Be"
4. "Baby Step Back"
5. "Early Morning Rain"
6. "Restless"
7. "A Painter Passing Through"
8. "Rainy Day People"
9. "Ringneck Loon"
10. "Shadows"
11. "Sundown"
12. "Carefree Highway"
13. "Christian Island"
14. "The Wreck of the Edmund Fitzgerald"
15. "Canadian Railroad Trilogy"
16. "Let It Ride"
17. "Blackberry Wine"
18. "Song for a Winter's Night"
19. "Old Dan's Records"

== Personnel ==
- Gordon Lightfoot – vocals, guitar
- Michael Heffernan – keyboards
- Rick Haynes – bass guitar
- Barry Keane – drums, percussion
- Terry Clements – guitar
