= Couchiching =

Couchiching may refer to:

- Couchiching First Nation, Rainy River District, Ontario, Canada
- Lake Couchiching, Simcoe County, Ontario, Canada
- "Couchiching", a song from Gordon Lightfoot's album Harmony

== See also ==
- Couchiching Institute on Public Affairs, an annual conference held on Lake Couchiching
- Couchiching Terriers, a defunct junior hockey team
