= Regency Records =

Regency Records may refer to:

- Regency Records (Canada), Toronto-based Canadian record label that was active from 1956 to 1966
- Regency Records (United States), Los Angeles-based American record label that was active from 1979 to c. 1983
