= Endless Wire (Gordon Lightfoot album) =

Studio album by Gordon Lightfoot
- Released: January 1978
- Recorded: August, November 1977
- Studios: Eastern Sound Studios, Toronto
- Genres: Folk, soft rock
- Length: 35:36
- Label: Warner Bros.
- Producers: Lenny Waronker, Gordon Lightfoot

Gordon Lightfoot chronology
Summertime Dream (1976)	Endless Wire (1978)	Dream Street Rose (1980)

Endless Wire is the Canadian singer Gordon Lightfoot's twelfth studio album, released in 1978 on Warner Bros. Records (#3149).

The closing track, "The Circle Is Small", was a re-recording of a song from Lightfoot's 1968 album, Back Here on Earth.

== Commercial performance ==
In the USA, Endless Wire peaked at #22 on Billboard 200 chart and #14 on the country album chart. In Canada it reached #2 on the RPM album chart, while in Australia it reached #56 on the Kent Music Report.

Three singles were released from the album. In the US, "The Circle Is Small" peaked at #3 on the adult contemporary chart, #33 on the pop chart and #92 on the country chart. In Canada, it reached #1 on the adult contemporary chart, #6 on the pop chart, and #9 on the country. "Dreamland" peaked at #100 on the US country chart and #24 on the Canadian adult contemporary chart. "Daylight Katy" reached #16 on the US adult contemporary chart, #25 on the Canadian adult contemporary chart, #44 on the Canadian pop chart, and #41 on the UK pop chart.

== Critical reception ==
Professional ratings
Review scores
Source	Rating
AllMusic	2/5 stars
Rolling Stone	(not rated)

The Globe and Mail called the album "a collection of soft melodies, impeccably sung and harmonized and backed up with only the most tasteful instrumentation."

In a 1993 interview with Billboard, Lightfoot stated that some of the stuff on Endless Wire should have "been done over again."

== Track listing ==
All songs composed by Gordon Lightfoot

1. "Daylight Katy" – 4:18
2. "Sweet Guinevere" – 3:16
3. "Hangdog Hotel Room" – 2:35
4. "If There's a Reason" – 4:52
5. "Endless Wire" – 4:07
6. "Dreamland" – 2:53
7. "Songs the Minstrel Sang" – 2:49
8. "Sometimes I Don't Mind" – 2:53
9. "If Children Had Wings" – 3:50
10. "The Circle Is Small (I Can See It in Your Eyes)" – 4:03

== Chart performance ==
=== Weekly charts ===
Chart (1978)	Peak position
Australia (Kent Music Report)	56
Canada Top Albums/CDs (RPM)	2
US Billboard 200	22

=== Year-end charts ===
Chart (1978)	Position
Canada Top Albums/CDs (RPM)	11

== Personnel ==
- Gordon Lightfoot - vocals, six and twelve-string guitar, high-string guitar, electric guitar
- Terry Clements - lead guitar
- Rick Haynes - bass guitar
- Tom Szczesniak - bass guitar
- Pee Wee Charles - steel guitar
- Red Shea - guitar
- Barry Keane - drums, percussion
- Doug Riley - orchestration, piano
- Jack Zaza - alto saxophone, tenor saxophone, shakers, baritone sax, bass clarinet, English horn, alto flute, harmonica, harmonium
- Mitch Clarke - bassoon
