= Sunday Concert =

Live album by Gordon Lightfoot
- Released: October 1969
- Recorded: March 1969
- Venue: Massey Hall, Toronto
- Genre: Folk, live
- Length: 40:36
- Label: United Artists
- Producer: Elliot Mazer

Gordon Lightfoot chronology
Back Here on Earth (1968)	Sunday Concert (1969)	Sit Down Young Stranger (1970)

Sunday Concert is Canadian singer Gordon Lightfoot's first solo live album, released in 1969 on the United Artists label. Lightfoot's last recording for United Artists, it was also his first live album and until the release of a live DVD in 2002 remained Lightfoot's only officially released live recording. The album was recorded at Massey Hall in Toronto.

The album is notable as it includes performances of five previously unreleased tracks. It also contains the first recording of Lightfoot's hits "I'm Not Sayin'" and "Ribbon of Darkness" together as a medley. This medley would later feature on Gord's Gold and would become a concert staple. "Ballad of Yarmouth Castle" chronicles the fate of the SS Yarmouth Castle which caught fire and sank off the Bahamas in November, 1965.

A 1993 CD reissue on Bear Family Records includes five studio recordings as bonus tracks.

== Reception ==
Professional ratings
Review scores
Source	Rating
Allmusic	3.5/5 stars

In his Allmusic review, critic Richie Unterberger praised the album, writing "These then-new songs aren't among his classics, but are up to the general high standard of his '60s work, with the socially conscious "The Lost Children" and the poetic "Leaves of Grass" standing out as lyrical highlights."

== Track listing ==
All songs written by Gordon Lightfoot, except where noted.

Side one

1. "In a Windowpane" – 3:11
2. "The Lost Children" – 2:47
3. "Leaves of Grass" – 3:43
4. "I'm Not Sayin'/Ribbon of Darkness" – 2:54
5. "Apology" – 4:33
6. "Bitter Green" – 2:43

Side two

1. "Ballad of Yarmouth Castle" – 5:18
2. "Softly" – 3:16
3. "Boss Man" – 2:26
4. "Pussy Willows, Cat-Tails" – 2:53
5. "Canadian Railroad Trilogy" – 6:41

== Personnel ==
- Gordon Lightfoot - vocals, acoustic guitar, piano
- Red Shea - lead guitar
- Rick Haynes - bass

Technical

- Elliot Mazer - producer
- Lee Hulko - mastering engineer
- Adam Mitchell - production assistant
- Bob Cato - design
- Jim Marshall - photography
