= Don Quixote (album) =

Studio album by Gordon Lightfoot
- Released: February 1972
- Recorded: December 1971 to January 1972
- Studio: Amigo Studios (North Hollywood, California)
- Genre: Folk
- Length: 41:41
- Label: Reprise
- Producer: Lenny Waronker

Gordon Lightfoot chronology
Summer Side of Life (1971)	Don Quixote (1972)	Old Dan's Records (1972)

Professional ratings
Review scores
Source	Rating
Allmusic	3/5 stars

Don Quixote is Canadian singer Gordon Lightfoot's seventh studio album, released in 1972 on the Reprise Records Label. The album reached #42 on the Billboard album chart.

The album contains little innovation on Lightfoot's trademark folk sound, although it is notable for containing Lightfoot's third and fourth seafaring songs, "Christian Island (Georgian Bay)" and "Ode to Big Blue" (his first two being "Marie Christine" from Back Here on Earth and "Ballad of Yarmouth Castle" from Sunday Concert). Lightfoot would continually revisit nautical themes over the next ten years. Don Quixote also contains a rare Lightfoot foray into the protest song genre in the form of the longest track on the album, "The Patriot's Dream", a ballad describing the enthusiasm of soldiers on a troop train "riding off to glory in the spring of their years", followed by the pathos of a woman receiving news that her husband's aircraft had been shot down in combat. The title track is a lyrical paean to Cervantes’ half-mad hero.

"Beautiful" was released as a single and peaked at #13 in Canada and #58 on the Billboard singles chart. The album itself was on the Canadian charts from March 11, 1972, to January 27, 1973.

On February 13, 1988, Lightfoot performed "Alberta Bound" in McMahon Stadium during the Opening Ceremonies for the 1988 Winter Olympics held in Calgary, Alberta, with Ian and Sylvia.

== Track listing ==
All compositions by Gordon except as indicated. Lightfoot was 34 at the time of the release.

=== Side 1 ===
1. "Don Quixote" – 3:41
2. "Christian Island (Georgian Bay)" – 4:02
3. "Alberta Bound" – 3:07
4. "Looking at the Rain" – 3:40
5. "Ordinary Man" – 3:19
6. "Brave Mountaineers" – 3:36

=== Side 2 ===
1. "Ode to Big Blue" – 4:48
2. "Second Cup of Coffee" – 3:03
3. "Beautiful" – 3:23
4. "On Susan's Floor" (Shel Silverstein, Vince Matthews) – 2:58
5. "The Patriot's Dream" – 6:04

== Personnel ==
- Gordon Lightfoot – 6- & 12-string guitar
- Red Shea – hi-string guitar, classical guitar, dobro
- Terry Clements – lead acoustic guitar
- Rick Haynes – bass
- Ry Cooder – mandolin
- Bob Thompson – string arrangements "Don Quixote" and "The Patriot's Dream"
- Nick DeCaro – all other string arrangements

== Chart positions ==
Year	Chart	Position
1972	Canadian RPM 100	1
1972	US Billboard 200	42
1972	UK	44
