= Bitter Green =

Single by Gordon Lightfoot

from the album Back Here on Earth
- B-side: "Does Your Mother Know"
- Released: September 1968
- Genre: Folk
- Length: 2:42
- Label: United Artists
- Songwriter(s): Gordon Lightfoot
- Producer(s): Elliot Mazer

Gordon Lightfoot singles chronology
"Black Day in July" (1968)	"Bitter Green" (1968)	"Me and Bobby McGee" (1970)

"Bitter Green" is a song by Gordon Lightfoot, first released in 1968 on his album Back Here on Earth. The single reached #44 in Canada.

Lightfoot also included the song on his 1969 live album Sunday Concert, and recorded a second studio version for his 1975 compilation album Gord's Gold. A cover version by Ronnie Hawkins reached #36 in 1970. The Idle Race recorded a version of the song on their 1971 album Time Is.

== Content ==
The song is a ballad about a woman who roams the hillsides above the town for years waiting for her lover to come home:

"Waiting for her master to kiss away her tears"

No one knows the identity or fate of her lover, but the woman is well known and loved. Years later, on one cold autumn day, a stranger walks into town and weeps at the churchyard where his beloved lies buried.

Townspeople speculate as to who the mystery man is:

"Some say he was a sailor who died away at sea

Some say he was a prisoner who never was set free
Lost upon the ocean, he died there in the mist
Dreaming of her kiss"

Her lover finally returns, too late, as the woman has died:

"But now the bitter green is gone, the hills have turned to rust
There comes a weary stranger, his tears fall in the dust
Kneeling by the churchyard in the autumn mist
Dreaming of her kiss"

== Chart performance ==
Chart (1968)	Peak position
Canadian RPM Top Singles	44
