= The Way I Feel (Gordon Lightfoot album) =

Studio album by Gordon Lightfoot
- Released: April 1967
- Recorded: 1966
- Studio: Columbia Studio A (Nashville, Tennessee)
- Genre: Folk
- Length: 38:21
- Label: United Artists
- Producer: John Court

Gordon Lightfoot chronology
Lightfoot! (1966)	The Way I Feel (1967)	Did She Mention My Name? (1968)

The Way I Feel is the second studio album by Canadian singer-songwriter Gordon Lightfoot, originally released in 1967 on the United Artists label.

== Reception ==
Professional ratings
Review scores
Source	Rating
Allmusic	4.5/5 stars

In his Allmusic review, critic Richie Unterberger praised the album, writing "The songs weren't quite as impressive as his first batch, but they were still very good, highlighted by the epic "Canadian Railroad Trilogy" and an electrified remake of "The Way I Feel" (#36 Canada). "Go-Go Round" reached #27. A cover of "Home From the Forest" by Ronnie Hawkins reached #60 in Canada, February 3, 1968. A cover of "The Way I Feel" by Fotheringay reached #71 in Canada, April 24, 1971.

== Track listing ==
All tracks are written by Gordon Lightfoot.

Side one
No.	Title	Length
1.	"Walls"	2:53
2.	"If You Got It"	2:31
3.	"Softly"	3:26
4.	"Crossroads"	2:58
5.	"A Minor Ballad"	3:15
6.	"Go-Go Round"	2:40

Side two
No.	Title	Length
1.	"Rosanna"	2:42
2.	"Home from the Forest"	3:04
3.	"I'll Be Alright"	2:27
4.	"Song for a Winter's Night"	3:01
5.	"Canadian Railroad Trilogy"	6:22
6.	"The Way I Feel"	3:02

== Personnel ==
- Gordon Lightfoot – guitar, piano, vocals
- Red Shea – lead guitar
- John Stockfish – bass
- Ken Buttrey – percussion
- Charles McCoy – 3rd guitar, harmonica, celeste, bells

Cover photography by Barry Feinstein
Cover notes by Robert Markle
