= Solo (Gordon Lightfoot album) =

Studio album by Gordon Lightfoot
- Released: March 20, 2020
- Recorded: 2019
- Studio: Grant Avenue (Hamilton, Canada)
- Genre: Folk
- Length: 33:01
- Language: English
- Label: Warner Music Canada
- Producer: Gordon Lightfoot

Gordon Lightfoot chronology
All Live (2012)	Solo (2020)	At Royal Albert Hall (2023)

Solo is the 20th and final studio album by Canadian folk singer-songwriter Gordon Lightfoot, released on March 20, 2020, three years before his death on May 1, 2023.

== Recording and release ==
Lightfoot had only recorded one album of new material in 20 years prior to this release and the songs are made up from demos that Lightfoot discovered from 2001 and 2002 that he wanted to put to record (with the exception of "Easy Flo," which was recorded in early 2020). After initially trying to orchestrate the songs and re-write several of them, he decided that they were fine as they were and set about to record his first solo album in his decades-long career.

== Reception ==
Solo ratings
Review scores
Source	Rating
AllMusic	3.5/5 stars
Exclaim!	7/10
The Young Folks	7/10

AllMusic Guide critic Mark Deming compared the album favorably to the artist's first recordings in the 1960s and noted that the stripped down recordings were a wise choice: "he may sound weaker than he used to, but he's also not fighting a band for attention, and the sly rounder that populated many of his early tunes is still faintly audible on Solo". In Exclaim!, Ian Gormley concurred that the sparse production techniques complement Lightfoot's softer vocals and opined, "the record showcases what Lightfoot has always done and always excelled at: songwriting".

== Track listing ==
All songs written by Gordon Lightfoot.

1. "Oh So Sweet" – 3:04
2. "E-Motion" – 3:15
3. "Better Off" – 3:04
4. "Return into Dust" – 3:05
5. "Do You Walk, Do You Talk" – 3:05
6. "Just a Little Bit" – 3:47
7. "Easy Flo" – 2:58
8. "Dreamdrift" – 3:46
9. "The Laughter We Seek" – 3:37
10. "Why Not Give It a Try" – 3:20

== Personnel ==
- Gordon Lightfoot – vocals, guitar, production
- Bob Doidge – recording, mixing
- Patrick Duffy – design
- Carl Dunn – photography
- Amy King – mastering at GZ Media, Czechia

== See also ==
- List of 2020 albums
