= Summer Side of Life =

Studio album by Gordon Lightfoot
- Released: May 1971
- Recorded: December 1970 – April 1971
- Studios: Woodland (Nashville, Tennessee)
- Genre: Folk
- Length: 38:21
- Label: Reprise
- Producer: Joseph Wissert

Gordon Lightfoot chronology
| Sit Down Young Stranger (1970) | Summer Side of Life (1971) | Don Quixote (1972) |

Singles from Summer Side Of Life
- 1. "Talking In Your Sleep" Released: June 1971; 2. "Summer Side Of Life" Released: September 1971

Summer Side of Life is Canadian singer-songwriter Gordon Lightfoot's sixth studio album. It was released in 1971 on the Reprise Records Label. The album marked a departure from the sound Lightfoot had established on Sit Down Young Stranger in its use of drums and electric instrumentation, to which he would later return in the second half of the decade. "Redwood Hill" contains elements of bluegrass music.

The album reached #38 on the pop chart. "Summer Side of Life" peaked at #98 on the pop singles chart while "Talking in Your Sleep" peaked at #64. The singles reached #21 and #19 respectively in Canada.

The track "Cotton Jenny" would later be covered by Anne Murray, for whom it would provide a top-twenty single on the U.S. country singles chart. The song "Love and Maple Syrup" was covered by Taylor Mitchell in 2009. Nanci Griffith covered "10 Degrees and Getting Colder" on her 1993 album, Other Voices, Other Rooms. The song had previously been recorded by J. D. Crowe & The New South on their eponymous album in 1975.

Professional ratings
Review scores
| Source | Rating |
|---|---|
| Allmusic | 3/5 stars |
| Rolling Stone | (not rated) |

== Track listing ==
All compositions by Gordon Lightfoot.

=== Side 1 ===
1. "10 Degrees and Getting Colder" – 2:43
2. "Miguel" – 4:12
3. "Go My Way" – 2:13
4. "Summer Side of Life" – 4:05
5. "Cotton Jenny" – 3:26
6. "Talking in Your Sleep" – 2:56

=== Side 2 ===
1. "Nous Vivons Ensemble" – 3:45
2. "Same Old Loverman" – 3:21
3. "Redwood Hill" – 2:48
4. "Love and Maple Syrup" – 3:13
5. "Cabaret" – 5:49

== Chart performance ==
| Chart (1971) | Peak position |
|---|---|
| Australia (Kent Music Report) | 40 |
| Canada Top Albums/CDs (RPM) | 3 |
| US Billboard 200 | 38 |

== Personnel ==
- Gordon Lightfoot - guitar, piano, vocals
- Red Shea - guitar
- Jerry Shook - guitar
- Chip Young - guitar
- Rick Haynes - bass guitar
- Roy M. "Junior" Huskey - acoustic bass
- James Rolleston - bass guitar
- Henry Strzelecki - bass guitar
- Kenneth A. Buttrey - drums
- Buddy Harman - drums
- Jimmy Isbell - drums
- David Brown - percussion
- Farrell Morris - percussion
- Vassar Clements - violin
- Charlie McCoy - harmonica
- Hargus "Pig" Robbins - piano
- The Jordanaires (Gordon Stoker, Neal Matthews, Hoyt Hawkins, Ray Walker) - backing vocals

Technical

- Rick Horton - engineer, remixing
- Harry Kemball - cover photography
