= Canadian Railroad Trilogy =

Single by Gordon Lightfoot

from the album The Way I Feel
- B-side: "It's My Time"
- Released: 1967
- Recorded: 1966 (rerecorded 1975)
- Genre: Folk
- Length: 6:22 (rerecorded 7:04)
- Label: United Artists
- Songwriter: Gordon Lightfoot

Gordon Lightfoot singles chronology
"The Way I Feel" (1967)	"Canadian Railroad Trilogy" (1967)	"Black Day in July" (1968)

"Canadian Railroad Trilogy" is a story song that was written, composed, and first performed in 1966 by Canadian singer-songwriter Gordon Lightfoot, who released his original recording of it in 1967. The song was commissioned by the Canadian Broadcasting Corporation (CBC) to celebrate the Canadian Centennial in 1967. "Canadian Railroad Trilogy" describes the building of the trans-Canada Canadian Pacific Railway, the construction work on which was completed in 1885. The CPR was incorporated in 1881 and merged with the Kansas City Southern Railway in 2023 to form the Canadian Pacific Kansas City.

== Background ==
This song was commissioned from Lightfoot by the CBC for a special broadcast on January 1, 1967, to start Canada's Centennial year. Writing and composing it took him three days. It appeared on Lightfoot's album The Way I Feel later in the same year along with the song "Crossroads", a shorter song of similar theme. The structure of the song, with a slow tempo section in the middle and faster paced sections at the beginning and end, was patterned more or less opposite to Bob Gibson's and Hamilton Camp's "Civil War Trilogy", famously recorded by The Limeliters on the 1963 live album Our Men In San Francisco. In the first section, the song picks up speed like a locomotive building up a head of steam.

While Lightfoot's song echoes the optimism of the railroad age, it also chronicles the cost in sweat and blood of building "an iron road runnin' from the sea to the sea". The slow middle section of the song is especially poignant, vividly describing the efforts and sorrows of the nameless and forgotten "navvies", whose manual labour actually built the railway.

Session personnel for the 1967 recording were these: Gordon Lightfoot on 12-string acoustic guitar, Red Shea on lead acoustic guitar, John Stockfish on Fender bass guitar, and Charlie McCoy on harmonica.

== Legacy ==
Lightfoot re-recorded the track on his 1975 compilation album, Gord's Gold, this time with full orchestration that Lee Holdridge arranged. A live version also appears on two of his live albums, first on his 1969 album Sunday Concert and again on the 2012 release All Live, which consists of songs recorded during the live concerts Lightfoot gave at Toronto's Massey Hall between 1998 and 2001.

According to Lightfoot, Pierre Berton, author of The Last Spike, once said "You did more good with your damn song than I did with my entire book on the same subject." In an interview with The Telegraph, Lightfoot indicated that upon meeting Queen Elizabeth II, she had told him how much she enjoyed the song.

In 2001, Gordon Lightfoot's "Canadian Railroad Trilogy" was honoured as one of the Canadian MasterWorks by the Audio-Visual Preservation Trust of Canada.

The song has been covered by John Mellencamp and George Hamilton IV (#3Can), among others. James Keelaghan performed the song on the Lightfoot tribute album, Beautiful. In the summer of 2004, the song was performed by that year's Canadian Idol Top 6.

The song was the inspiration for the song "Canadian Snacktime Trilogy" on the Barenaked Ladies children's album Snacktime!. The song features many celebrities sharing their favorite snacks, including Geddy Lee, Janeane Garofalo, Mike Smith (as Bubbles), Sarah McLachlan, "Weird Al" Yankovic, and Lightfoot himself, who states his favorite snack is pasta.

"Canadian Railroad Trilogy" has become one of Lightfoot's signature songs, and for years he concluded many, though not all, of his concerts by performing it.

== See also ==
- Canadian patriotic music
- List of train songs
