= Dream Street Rose =

Studio album by Gordon Lightfoot
- Released: 1980
- Recorded: November 1979
- Studio: WB Recording, Los Angeles, CA
- Genre: Folk, Country folk
- Length: 33:44
- Label: Warner Bros.
- Producer: Gordon Lightfoot, Lenny Waronker & Russ Titelman

Gordon Lightfoot chronology
Endless Wire (1978)	Dream Street Rose (1980)	Shadows (1982)

Singles from Dream Street Rose
- 1. "Dream Street Rose" Released: May 1980; 2. "If You Need Me" Released: Jul 1980

Professional ratings
Review scores
Source	Rating
Allmusic	2.5/5 stars

Dream Street Rose is Canadian singer Gordon Lightfoot's thirteenth studio album, released in 1980 on the Warner Brothers Records label (#3426). The album peaked at #58 on the country chart and at #60 on the pop chart. It was the last album that would see Lightfoot collaborate with long-time producer Lenny Waronker.

The album continues in the style of Summertime Dream (1976) and Endless Wire (1978), with a mix of faster-paced, country-style songs, and introspective folk ballads. Lightfoot's penchant for seafaring songs was again evident with three songs featuring an ocean theme.

== Track listing ==
All composition by Gordon Lightfoot; except as indicated

1. "Sea of Tranquility" – 3:17
2. "Ghosts of Cape Horn" – 4:09
3. "Dream Street Rose" – 2:58
4. "On the High Seas" – 3:18
5. "Whisper My Name" – 3:12
6. "If You Need Me" – 2:50
7. "Hey You" – 2:53
8. "Make Way for the Lady" – 3:43
9. "Mister Rock of Ages" – 3:33
10. "The Auctioneer" (Leroy Van Dyke, Buddy Black) – 3:51

== Personnel ==
- Gordon Lightfoot - vocals, guitar
- Terry Clements - lead guitar
- Rick Haynes - bass
- Pee Wee Charles - pedal steel guitar
- Barry Keane - drums and percussion
- Michael Omartian - piano, keyboards

== Chart performance ==
Chart (1980)	Peak position
Australia (Kent Music Report)	76
Canadian RPM Country Albums	1
Canadian RPM Top Albums	9
U.S. Billboard Top Country Albums	58
U.S. Billboard 200	60
