= Salute (Gordon Lightfoot album) =

Studio album by Gordon Lightfoot
- Released: July 1983
- Recorded: December 1982–February 1983
- Studio: Eastern Sound, Toronto, Ontario, Canada
- Genre: Folk
- Length: 36:16
- Label: Warner Bros.
- Producer: Dean Parks, Gordon Lightfoot

Gordon Lightfoot chronology
Shadows (1982)	Salute (1983)	East of Midnight (1986)

Singles from Salute
- 1. "Salute (A Lot More Livin' to Do)" Released: August 1983; 2. "Without You" Released: November 1983; 3. "Whispers of the North" Released: 1983

Salute is the fifteenth studio album by Canadian musician Gordon Lightfoot, released in 1983 by Warner Brothers Records. It barely registered on the charts (#175) and is one of his least-known recordings. Consequently, songs from the album were rarely featured in Lightfoot's live performances.

The album completed Lightfoot's shift from acoustic folk/country compositions to a more sleek adult contemporary sound, a shift he had begun on Shadows. However, he had never wholly abandoned his folk roots, as "Whispers of the North," "Knotty Pine," and "Tattoo" show.

The album was generally more upbeat than its introspective predecessor and made greater use of electric guitar licks and synthesizers.

Professional ratings
Review scores
Source	Rating
AllMusic	3/5 stars

== Track listing ==
All compositions by Gordon Lightfoot

1. "Salute (A Lot More Livin' to Do)" - 4:24
2. "Gotta Get Away" - 2:54
3. "Whispers of the North" - 3:20
4. "Someone to Believe In" - 3:32
5. "Romance" - 3:31
6. "Knotty Pine" - 4:00
7. "Biscuit City" - 2:55
8. "Without You" - 3:07
9. "Tattoo" - 4:28
10. "Broken Dreams" - 4:05

== Personnel ==
- Gordon Lightfoot - vocals, rhythm guitar
- Terry Clements - lead guitar
- Dean Parks - lead guitar, synthesizer
- Pee Wee Charles - steel guitar
- Hadley Hockensmith - bass guitar, hi-string bass
- Rick Haynes - bass guitar
- Mike Heffernan - piano, electric piano
- Harlan Rodgers - piano
- Carol Parks - harmony vocals
- Barry Keane - drums, percussion
