= A Painter Passing Through =

Studio album by Gordon Lightfoot
- Released: May 1, 1998
- Recorded: 1996–1997
- Studio: Grant Avenue (Hamilton, Canada)
- Genre: Folk
- Length: 37:28
- Label: Reprise
- Producers: Bob Doidge, Gordon Lightfoot

Gordon Lightfoot chronology
Waiting for You (1993)	A Painter Passing Through (1998)	Harmony (2004)

A Painter Passing Through is the eighteenth studio album by Canadian singer Gordon Lightfoot, released in 1998 on Reprise Records. It was his first album of original music in five years after Waiting for You, which had been his first since 1986's East of Midnight. Well-known record producer Daniel Lanois makes a guest appearance on the album. A Painter Passing Through is a live studio album.

The song "Drifters" was performed by Ron Sexsmith on the album, Beautiful: A Tribute to Gordon Lightfoot, in 2003.

Professional ratings
Review scores
Source	Rating
Allmusic	link
Starpulse	3.5/5 stars

== Track listing ==
All compositions by Gordon Lightfoot, except where noted

1. "Drifters" - 3:27
2. "My Little Love" - 4:08
3. "Ringneck Loon" - 4:14
4. "I Used to Be a Country Singer" (Steve McEown) - 3:16
5. "Boathouse" - 4:13
6. "Much to My Surprise" - 3:42
7. "A Painter Passing Through" - 3:55
8. "On Yonge Street" - 4:27
9. "Red Velvet" (Ian Tyson) - 2:37
10. "Uncle Toad Said" - 3:29

== Personnel ==
- Gordon Lightfoot – vocals, six, twelve and high-string guitars
- Terry Clements – acoustic and electric guitars
- Daniel Lanois – electric and mando-guitars on (5, 8)
- Bill Dillon – electric guitar on (1, 2), guitorgan on (3)
- Wendell Ferguson – electric guitar on (4, 9)
- John Lewis – electric guitar on (6)
- Doug Johnson – steel guitar on (9), dobro on (9)
- Pee Wee Charles – pedal steel guitar on (6)
- Rick Haynes – bass guitar
- Mike Heffernan – synthesizer, keyboards
- Barry Keane – drums, percussion
- Lisa Logan on (4, 7, 9), Lisa Winn on (4), Bob Doidge on (4, 5, 7) – backing vocals
- Willie P. Bennett – harmonica on (10)
