= Song for a Winter's Night =

Song by Gordon Lightfoot

from the album The Way I Feel
- Released: 1967
- Genre: Folk
- Length: 3:01
- Label: United Artists
- Songwriter: Gordon Lightfoot
- Producer: John Court

"Song for a Winter's Night" is a song written by Gordon Lightfoot, and first recorded for his album The Way I Feel (1967). Lightfoot recorded another version of the song for Gord's Gold (1975), a greatest hits compilation on which other re-recordings also appeared.

== Background ==
The song was written on a hot summer night in Cleveland while Lightfoot was performing there. He was missing his wife of the time, Brita Ingegerd Olaisson, and his thoughts turned to winter.

== Covers ==
Sarah McLachlan covered the song for the soundtrack to the 1994 film Miracle on 34th Street; her rendition also appears on her 1996 compilation album Rarities, B-Sides and Other Stuff, on her 2006 Christmas album Wintersong, and in the soundtrack for the TV series Due South.

Other artists who have covered the song include:

Artist	Album	Date	Notes
The Raftsmen	On Target	1967	retitled "The Hands I Love"
Harry Belafonte	Belafonte on Campus	1967	retitled "The Hands I Love"
Kenny Rankin	Mind-Dusters	1967	
Catherine McKinnon	Everybody's Talkin'	1969	
Tony Rice	Me & My Guitar	1986	
Schooner Fare	Home for the Holidays	1987	
Sarah McLachlan	Miracle on 34th Street	1994	film soundtrack
Sarah McLachlan	Due South	1994–1999	TV series soundtrack
Sarah McLachlan	Rarities, B-Sides and Other Stuff	1996	compilation
Sarah McLachlan	Wintersong	2006	Christmas album
Quartette	Beautiful: A Tribute to Gordon Lightfoot	2003	
Tommy Fleming	Song for a Winter's Night	2009	
Reid Jamieson	Songs for a Winter's Night	2012	
Sanna Nielsen	Min jul	2013	
Blue Rodeo	A Merrie Christmas to You	2014	
Goodnight Sunrise	Single	2018	
Glass Tiger	"Songs For A Winter's Night"	2020	
Bedford Bells	Single	December 2023	
