= Waiting for You (Gordon Lightfoot album) =

Waiting For You

Studio album by Gordon Lightfoot
- Released: April 13, 1993
- Recorded: March 1992
- Studios: Eastern Sound, Toronto, Ontario, Canada
- Genre: Folk
- Length: 36:04
- Label: Reprise
- Producer: Gordon Lightfoot

Gordon Lightfoot chronology
East of Midnight (1986)	Waiting For You (1993)	A Painter Passing Through (1998)

Professional ratings
Review scores
Source	Rating
Allmusic	3/5 stars
Starpulse	3.5/5 stars

Waiting for You is Canadian singer Gordon Lightfoot's seventeenth studio album, released in 1993 on the Reprise Records label.

It was his first album since 1986 and represented a comeback of sorts, since he had stated that East of Midnight would be his last. The album is dedicated to his wife Elizabeth and son Miles. Lightfoot produced the album himself.

It is considered a return to form after his previous two or three outings which had moved more into the adult contemporary genre with greater use of electric guitar and synthesizers.

Commenting on the album, Lightfoot has stated that he didn't want to be "quite so serious" making it as he had been in past years and that he was pleased with the album.

== Track listing ==
All compositions by Gordon Lightfoot except as indicated

1. "Restless" – 3:36
2. "Ring Them Bells" – 2:56 (Bob Dylan)
3. "Fading Away" – 3:10
4. "Only Love Would Know" – 4:18
5. "Welcome to Try" – 4:03
6. "I'll Prove My Love" – 3:10
7. "Waiting for You" – 3:35
8. "Wild Strawberries" – 4:17
9. "I'd Rather Press On" – 3:43
10. "Drink Yer Glasses Empty" – 3:16

== Personnel ==
- Gordon Lightfoot - vocals, guitar
- Terry Clements - lead guitar
- Rick Haynes - bass
- Mike Heffernan - keyboards
- Barry Keane - drums, percussion
