= Did She Mention My Name? =

Studio album by Gordon Lightfoot
- Released: January 1968
- Recorded: December 1967
- Genre: Folk
- Length: 36:42
- Label: United Artists
- Producer: John Simon

Gordon Lightfoot chronology
The Way I Feel (1967)	Did She Mention My Name? (1968)	Back Here on Earth (1968)

Did She Mention My Name? is the third studio album by Canadian singer Gordon Lightfoot, released in 1968 on the United Artists label. The album marked Lightfoot's first use of orchestration.

== Songs ==
"Black Day in July" was written by Lightfoot about the 1967 Detroit riot to inform people about racial strife in the United States. Lightfoot stated that he wrote the song "as a newspaper man would write an article." The song was covered by The Tragically Hip for the 2003 Lightfoot tribute album, Beautiful: A Tribute to Gordon Lightfoot.

== Reception ==
Professional ratings
Review scores
Source	Rating
AllMusic	4.5/5 stars

In his AllMusic review, critic Richie Unterberger praised the album, writing "Though a tad more erratic than his earlier efforts, his songwriting remained remarkably consistent. His characteristically bright, uplifting outlook became more diverse as well ..."

== Track listing ==
All songs written by Gordon Lightfoot.

Side one

1. "Wherefore and Why" – 2:51
2. "The Last Time I Saw Her" – 5:10
3. "Black Day in July" – 4:10
4. "May I" – 2:19
5. "Magnificent Outpouring" – 2:20
6. "Does Your Mother Know" – 3:33

Side two

1. "The Mountain and Maryann" – 3:35
2. "Pussywillows, Cat-Tails" – 2:48
3. "I Want to Hear It From You" – 2:22
4. "Something Very Special" – 3:19
5. "Boss Man" – 2:10
6. "Did She Mention My Name?" – 2:27

== Personnel ==
- Gordon Lightfoot — 6 & 12 string acoustic guitars, vocals
- Herbie Lovelle — drums, percussion
- Hugh McCracken — electric guitar
- Red Shea — lead acoustic guitar
- John Simon — string arrangements
- John Stockfish — bass

Technical

- Tim Lewis — cover design
- Charles Steiner, Daniel Kramer — photography
