= Regency Records (Canada) =

Regency Records (RR) was a Canadian record label that was active from 1956 to 1966. Based in Toronto, it was initially led by Don McKim, who was a former disc jockey in that city. It was created by Phonodisc Records of Scarborough, Ontario to serve as a Canadian outlet for American recordings. In its first year songs released in Canada on the label included The Chips's recording of "Rubber Biscuit" and Earl Bostic's rendition of "Harlem Nocturne". Some later releases on the label in the 1950s included Little Richard's "Keep A-Knockin'" (1957) and "Can't Believe You Wanna Leave" (1957); "The Whole Town Knows" / "Loads Of Love" by The 4 Emcees and Sheila Guthrie (1958); Red and Les Trio's "Marlene" (1958); "Oo-Clazy!" / "Chicky-Cha" by The Dazzlers (1958); and Eddy Clermont "My Love" (1959); the latter of which was a top 10 hit on the CHUM Chart. RR releases in the 1960s included Larry Meadows's "Such A Lonely Boy" / "Don't Hide Your Love" (1962); and The Townsmen's version of "The Lion Sleeps Tonight" (1966) which was issued in its final year of operation.
