= Ribbon of Darkness =

1965 single by Gordon Lightfoot

Single by Gordon Lightfoot
- B-side: "Just Like Tom Thumb's Blues"
- Released: 1965
- Label: United Artists
- Songwriter: Gordon Lightfoot

Gordon Lightfoot singles chronology
"I'm Not Sayin'" (1965)	"Ribbon of Darkness" (1965)	"For Loving Me" (1966)

"Ribbon of Darkness"

Single by Marty Robbins
- B-side: "Little Robin"
- Released: March 22, 1965
- Genre: Country
- Length: 2:30
- Label: Columbia 4-43258
- Songwriter: Gordon Lightfoot

Marty Robbins singles chronology
"Turn the Lights Down Low" (1965)	"Ribbon of Darkness" (1965)	"Old Red" (1965)

"Ribbon of Darkness" is a song written by Gordon Lightfoot that was released in 1965 as a single by Marty Robbins. The song was Robbins' eleventh number one on the U.S. country singles chart, where it spent one week at the top and a total of nineteen weeks on the chart.

Lightfoot's own version was released as single in 1965 and included in his 1966 debut album Lightfoot! and again for his 1975 compilation album Gord's Gold. The latter recording features the song in a medley with "I'm Not Sayin'", as does the live recording from Lightfoot's 1969 Sunday Concert album.

== Other cover versions ==
- In 1969, Connie Smith made the top 20 on the country chart with her version, peaking at #13.
- Crystal Gayle sang the song in her first television appearance. Video on YouTube and she released as the first single from her twenty sixth studio album You Don't Know Me: Classic Country in 2019. Her first single in 16 years.
- Jack Scott, 1950s rock 'n' roll legend, recorded the song for his 2015 release Way to Survive.
- Canadian singer-songwriter Bruce Cockburn contributed a cover of the song to the 2003 tribute album Beautiful: A Tribute to Gordon Lightfoot.

Conway Twitty covered Ribbon of Darkness on his 1966 album Conway Twitty Sings, as did Don McLean on his 2001 album Don McLean Sings Marty Robbins.

== Chart performance ==
=== Marty Robbins ===
Chart (1965)	Peak position
US Hot Country Songs (Billboard)	1
US Bubbling Under Hot 100 (Billboard)	3

=== Connie Smith ===
Chart (1969)	Peak position
US Hot Country Songs (Billboard)	13
Canada Country Singles (RPM)	1
