= Cold on the Shoulder (Gordon Lightfoot album) =

Studio album by Gordon Lightfoot
- Released: February 1975
- Recorded: September–December 1974
- Studios: Eastern Sound, Toronto, Ontario, Canada
- Genre: Folk
- Length: 43:12
- Label: Reprise
- Producer: Lenny Waronker

Gordon Lightfoot chronology
| Sundown (1974) | Cold on the Shoulder (1975) | Summertime Dream (1976) |

Professional ratings
Review scores
| Source | Rating |
|---|---|
| AllMusic | 3/5 stars |
| Rolling Stone | (not rated) |

Cold on the Shoulder is Canadian singer Gordon Lightfoot's tenth studio album, released in 1975 on the Reprise Records label.

== Track listing ==
All compositions by Gordon Lightfoot

Side 1

1. "Bend in the Water" – 2:59
2. "Rainy Day People" – 2:48
3. "Cold on the Shoulder" – 3:00
4. "The Soul Is the Rock" – 5:49
5. "Bells of the Evening" – 3:56
6. "Rainbow Trout" – 2:51

Side 2

1. "A Tree Too Weak to Stand" – 3:22
2. "All the Lovely Ladies" – 3:35
3. "Fine as Fine Can Be" – 2:58
4. "Cherokee Bend" – 5:02
5. "Now and Then" – 3:09
6. "Slide on Over" – 3:43

== Chart performance ==
=== Weekly charts ===
| Chart (1975) | Peak position |
|---|---|
| Australia (Kent Music Report) | 44 |
| Canada Top Albums/CDs (RPM) | 3 |
| US Billboard 200 | 10 |

=== Year-end charts ===
| Chart (1975) | Position |
|---|---|
| Canada Top Albums/CDs (RPM) | 22 |

== Personnel ==
- Gordon Lightfoot - main performer, 6- and 12-string acoustic guitars, piano, vocals
- Terry Clements - acoustic guitar
- Red Shea - classical guitar, acoustic guitar
- Pee Wee Charles - steel guitar
- Rick Haynes - bass
- John Stockfish - bass
- Jim Gordon - drums, percussion
- Milt Holland - percussion
- Nick DeCaro - accordion, celesta, orchestral arrangements
- Jack Zaza - wind
- Suzie McCune - vocals
- Jackie Ward Singers - vocals
