= Shadows (Gordon Lightfoot album) =

Studio album by Gordon Lightfoot
- Released: January 1982
- Recorded: March – April, June 1981
- Studios: Eastern Sound, Toronto
- Genre: Folk
- Length: 37:23
- Label: Warner Bros.
- Producers: Gordon Lightfoot, Ken Friesen

Gordon Lightfoot chronology
Dream Street Rose (1980)	Shadows (1982)	Salute (1983)

Shadows is Canadian singer Gordon Lightfoot's fourteenth studio album, released in 1982 on the Warner Bros. Records label. It peaked at #87 on the Billboard charts.

The album marked another significant turning point in Lightfoot's musical evolution. He moves further away from his acoustic roots through greater use of synthesizers and electric organ.

The album is softer in composition than its immediate predecessors with a return to slower, more introspective ballads as compared to the faster, country style of Lightfoot's mid-1970s albums.

Although a commercial failure (Lightfoot referred to it as "the music industry's best-kept secret"), the critical reception of the album was positive.

"Baby Step Back" peaked at number 17 on the US Adult Contemporary chart and #50 on the Billboard Hot 100. It also reached number six on the Canadian Adult Contemporary chart.

Professional ratings
Review scores
Source	Rating
AllMusic	4/5 stars

== Track listing ==
All songs composed by Gordon Lightfoot

1. "14 Karat Gold" – 3:56
2. "In My Fashion" – 3:05
3. "Shadows" – 3:02
4. "Blackberry Wine" – 3:05
5. "Heaven Help the Devil" – 3:14
6. "Thank You For the Promises" – 2:53
7. "Baby Step Back" – 3:59
8. "All I'm After" – 3:23
9. "Triangle" – 4:10
10. "I'll Do Anything" – 3:25
11. "She's Not the Same" – 3:11

== Personnel ==
- Gordon Lightfoot – vocals, harmony vocals, rhythm guitar
- Rick Haynes – bass guitar
- Terry Clements – lead guitar
- Barry Keane – drums, percussion
- Michael Heffernan – keyboards, synthesizer
- Pee Wee Charles – steel guitar, dobro
- Dean Parks – electric guitar
- Dennis Pendrith – bass guitar
- Robbie Buchanan – synthesizer
- Victor Feldman – percussion
- Herb Pedersen – harmony vocals
- Patrick Miles – electric guitar
