= I'm Not Sayin' =

1965 single by Gordon Lightfoot

Single by Gordon Lightfoot
- B-side: "For Loving Me"
- Released: 1965
- Recorded: December 1964
- Label: WB Records
- Songwriter: Gordon Lightfoot

Gordon Lightfoot singles chronology
"Day Before Yesterday" (1963)	"I'm Not Sayin'" (1965)	"Ribbon of Darkness" (1965)

"I'm Not Sayin'" is a song written by Gordon Lightfoot. It was recorded in December 1964 and released as a single A-side in 1965 and on his 1966 debut album Lightfoot! The lyrics detail the singer's promise: not that he can necessarily love the subject, or be true to the subject, but only that he can try to do so. The single peaked at #12 in Canada in June 1965. Cash Box described it as "a rhythmic, folkish ode about a guy who refuses to make any romantic promises to his girlfriend."

In late May 1965, Nico recorded a version released on Immediate Records. The single had limited success. This version of the song features Jimmy Page, then a studio musician, on the 12-string guitar. Nico's version was produced by Page as well, and the promo film was shot at West India Docks in London.

Other artists who have recorded this song include Norman Blake & Tony Rice, James Booker, Turley Richards, Ian Campbell Folk Group, and the Replacements.

On Lightfoot's 1975 platinum compilation LP Gord's Gold, the song appears in a re-recorded medley with "Ribbon of Darkness". Lightfoot's 1969 live album Sunday Concert also features a medley of the two songs.

Nico's version was one of the Desert Island Discs chosen by former Smiths frontman Morrissey on the show broadcast 29 November 2009 on BBC Radio Four.

The reformed Replacements recorded a version for their 2013 release, Songs for Slim, to benefit their former guitarist, Slim Dunlap.
