= Sundown (Gordon Lightfoot album) =

Studio album by Gordon Lightfoot
- Released: January 18, 1974
- Recorded: November 1973
- Studio: Eastern Sound Studios (Toronto)
- Genre: Folk
- Length: 36:12
- Label: Reprise
- Producer: Lenny Waronker

Gordon Lightfoot chronology
Old Dan's Records (1972)	Sundown (1974)	Cold on the Shoulder (1975)

Singles from Sundown
- 1. "Sundown" Released: March 25, 1974; 2. "Carefree Highway" Released: August 1974

Sundown is the ninth studio album by Canadian singer Gordon Lightfoot, released in 1974 on Reprise Records. It was the only Lightfoot album to reach No. 1 on the pop chart in the US. In his native Canada, it topped the RPM 100 for five consecutive weeks, first hitting No. 1 on June 22, 1974, the same day it reached the top of the chart south of the border.

The album marked the pinnacle of Lightfoot's acoustic folk-country blend before he embarked on an increasing use of electric instruments, although he did include some electric guitar, notably on the title track.

As for singles, the title track reached No. 1 on the pop and adult contemporary charts as well as #13 on the country chart, while "Carefree Highway" reached No. 10 on the pop chart, No. 1 on the AC chart and No. 81 on the country chart.

Professional ratings
Review scores
Source	Rating
Allmusic	4.5/5 stars
Christgau's Record Guide	B−
Rolling Stone	(favorable)

== Original LP release ==
All tracks are written by Gordon Lightfoot.

Side 1 (LP)
No.	Title	Length
1.	"Somewhere U.S.A."	2:50
2.	"High and Dry"	2:12
3.	"Seven Island Suite"	6:00
4.	"Circle of Steel"	2:45
5.	"Is There Anyone Home"	3:15

Side 2 (LP)
No.	Title	Length
6.	"The Watchman's Gone"	4:25
7.	"Sundown"	3:45
8.	"Carefree Highway"	3:45
9.	"The List"	3:00
10.	"Too Late for Prayin'"	4:15

== Compact cassette (rep ms 2177) ==
Side 1 (Cassette, TT: 18:43)
No.	Title	Length
1.	"Sundown"	3:45
2.	"Somewhere U.S.A."	2:50
3.	"Seven Island Suite"	6:00
4.	"Circle of Steel"	2:45
5.	"Is There Anyone Home"	3:15

Side 2 (Cassette, TT: 17:50)
No.	Title	Length
6.	"High and Dry"	2:12
7.	"The Watchman's Gone"	4:25
8.	"Carefree Highway"	3:45
9.	"The List"	3:00
10.	"Too Late for Prayin'"	4:15

== Chart performance ==
=== Weekly charts ===
Chart (1974)	Peak position
Australia (Kent Music Report)	13
Canada Top Albums/CDs (RPM)	1
US Billboard 200	1

=== Year-end charts ===
Chart (1974)	Position
Canada Top Albums/CDs (RPM)	3
US Billboard 200	14

== Certifications ==
Region	Certification	Certified units/sales
Australia (ARIA)	Gold	20,000^{^}
^{^} Shipments figures based on certification alone.

== Personnel ==
- Gordon Lightfoot – lead and backing vocals, 6- and 12-string acoustic guitars, high-strung guitar Nashville tuning, chimes, bells
- Red Shea – electric, acoustic and classical guitars, dobro, slide dobro (tracks 1–5, 7, 9, 10)
- Terry Clements – acoustic guitar (tracks 1, 3–10)
- Rick Haynes – bass guitar (tracks 1, 4, 8, 9)
- John Stockfish – bass guitar (tracks 2, 3, 5–7, 10)
- Jim Gordon – drums, percussion (tracks 1–3, 5–9)
- Milt Holland – percussion, congas (tracks 1, 5, 6, 9)
- Nick De Caro – accordion, horns, orchestration, piano, strings (tracks 3, 5, 6, 8, 10)
- Gene Martynec – Moog synthesizer (tracks 3, 5)
- Jack Zaza – English horn, recorder (track 4)
- Catherine Smith – harmony vocals (track 2)
