= East of Midnight =

Studio album by Gordon Lightfoot
- Released: July 1986
- Recorded: January, June, December 1985 and March 1986
- Studio: Eastern Sound, Toronto, Canada; Lion Share, Los Angeles; Lighthouse Recorders, Los Angeles
- Genre: Folk, Adult Contemporary
- Length: 37:25
- Label: Warner Bros.
- Producer: Gordon Lightfoot, David Foster ("Anything for Love" only)

Gordon Lightfoot chronology
Salute (1983)	East of Midnight (1986)	Waiting for You (1993)

Professional ratings
Review scores
Source	Rating
Allmusic	2/5 stars

East of Midnight is Canadian musician Gordon Lightfoot's sixteenth studio album, released in 1986 on the Warner Bros. Records label. The album reached #165 on the Billboard 200.

Lightfoot enlisted keyboardist and producer David Foster on the song "Anything for Love", which reached #13 on the Adult Contemporary chart and #71 on the Country chart.

== Track listing ==
All compositions by Gordon Lightfoot, except as indicated

1. "Stay Loose" – 3:53
2. "Morning Glory" – 3:24
3. "East of Midnight" – 3:58
4. "A Lesson in Love" – 4:05
5. "Anything for Love" – 3:43 (Lightfoot, David Foster)
6. "Let it Ride" – 3:40
7. "Ecstasy Made Easy" – 4:05
8. "You Just Gotta Be" – 3:34
9. "A Passing Ship" – 3:55
10. "I'll Tag Along" – 3:08

== Personnel ==
- Gordon Lightfoot - vocals, guitar
- Bob Mann - guitar, rhythm guitar
- Michael Landau - guitar
- Tom Szczesniak - bass, keyboards, synthesizer
- David Foster - keyboards, synthesizer
- James Newton Howard - keyboards, synthesizer, percussion
- Mike Heffernan - keyboards
- Lou Pomanti - Hammond organ
- Vern Dorge - alto saxophone, tenor saxophone
- Sheree Jeacocke - harmony vocals
- Richard Marx - harmony vocals
- Vesta Williams - harmony vocals
- Barry Keane - drums, percussion
- Lenny Castro - percussion

== Certifications ==
Region	Certification	Certified units/sales
Canada (Music Canada)	Gold	50,000^{^}
^{^} Shipments figures based on certification alone.
