= Back Here on Earth =

Studio album by Gordon Lightfoot
- Released: November 1968
- Recorded: September 1968
- Studios: Bradley's Barn, Mount Juliet, Tennessee
- Genre: Folk
- Length: 35:06
- Label: United Artists
- Producer: Elliot Mazer

Gordon Lightfoot chronology
Did She Mention My Name (1968)	Back Here on Earth (1968)	Sunday Concert (1969)

Back Here On Earth is Canadian singer Gordon Lightfoot's fourth studio album, released in 1968 on the United Artists label.

Apart from his eponymous debut album and final album (Solo), it is Lightfoot's only studio album not to derive its title from a song on the album. Back Here on Earth was Lightfoot's last studio recording on the United Artists label which he left after releasing the live album Sunday Concert in 1969.

Bear Family Records reissued Lightfoot's previous album, Did She Mention My Name, together with this album, Back Here on Earth, as a 2-in-1 CD in 1993. It included as a bonus track a recording of "Spin, Spin" which did not appear on any of Lightfoot's original studio albums, though a John Court production of it was released as a single in 1966. The version on the Bear Family Records reissue is tagged (New York remake version) and was produced by John Simon.

== Reception ==
Professional ratings
Review scores
Source	Rating
Allmusic	3/5 stars

In his Allmusic review, critic Richie Unterberger wrote of the album "It's not quite as outstanding as his first three albums, lacking highlights on the order of "Early Mornin' Rain" or "Black Day in July." Lightfoot never offered weak material on his United Artists efforts, however, and Back Here on Earth is still a very solid set, certainly worth acquiring if you like his other LPs for this label."

== Track listing ==
All songs written by Gordon Lightfoot.

Side one

1. "Long Way Back Home" – 3:02
2. "Unsettled Ways" – 1:51
3. "Long Thin Dawn" – 2:57
4. "Bitter Green" – 2:42
5. "The Circle Is Small (I Can See It in Your Eyes)" – 3:26
6. "Marie Christine" – 2:54

Side two

1. "Cold Hands from New York" – 5:16
2. "Affair on 8th Avenue" – 3:25
3. "Don't Beat Me Down" – 3:16
4. "The Gypsy" – 2:45
5. "If I Could" – 4:02

== Personnel ==
- Gordon Lightfoot - 6 & 12 string acoustic guitar, vocals
- Red Shea - lead acoustic guitar
- John Stockfish - bass

Technical

- Elliot Mazer - producer
- Bill Blachly, Charlie Tallent - engineer
- Harry Kemball - photography
