= Sit Down Young Stranger =

Studio album by Gordon Lightfoot
- Released: April 1970
- Recorded: Early 1970
- Genre: Folk
- Length: 36:44
- Label: Reprise
- Producer: Lenny Waronker, Joseph Wissert

Gordon Lightfoot chronology
| Sunday Concert (1969) | Sit Down Young Stranger (1970) | Summer Side of Life (1971) |

Singles from Sit Down Young Stranger
- 1. "Me And Bobby McGee" Released: June 1970; 2. "Approaching Lavender" Released: 1970; 3. "If You Could Read My Mind" Released: December 1970

Sit Down Young Stranger is Canadian singer Gordon Lightfoot's fifth original album and his best-selling original album. Shortly after its 1970 release on the Reprise Records label, it was renamed If You Could Read My Mind when the song of that title reached #1 on the RPM Top Singles chart in Canada and #5 on the Billboard Hot 100 in the US. The album itself reached #12 on the Billboard 200 chart. In Canada, the album was on the charts from April 18, 1970, to November 27, 1971. It peaked at #8 on March 13, 1971 after an earlier peak at #12 on June 20, 1970. Its last 24 weeks were spent in the 90s, except for two appearances at #88 and one at #100.

== History ==
Sit Down Young Stranger was Lightfoot's first recording for his new label, Reprise Records. He had left United Artists because he believed they did not adequately promote his albums.

On this album, Lightfoot included more orchestration, particularly evident on "If You Could Read My Mind". It was also the first studio album to feature long-time Lightfoot bassist Rick Haynes. The orchestrations on "Minstrel of the Dawn" and "Approaching Lavender" were arranged by Randy Newman.

The album contained one of the first recorded versions of Kris Kristofferson and Fred Foster's "Me and Bobby McGee", which had previously been a country hit for Roger Miller and would later become a hit for Janis Joplin.

A small number of vinyl copies of the album contain no title on the front cover. This is because the cover was originally supposed to be just a picture of Lightfoot, but Reprise executives thought that stating the title would increase the album's sales. The untitled copies did have a small sticker on the cellophane wrap bearing the album's title.

One rarity of note is "The Pony Man" appears on the Warner Brothers loss leader Schlagers! without the harmonica overdub.

== Reception ==
Professional ratings
Review scores
| Source | Rating |
|---|---|
| Allmusic | 4.5/5 stars |

In his retrospective Allmusic review, critic Jim Newsom praised the album, writing "While future albums would begin to drift away from the folky acoustic timbres of this one, the beauty and simplicity of Sit Down Young Stranger make it a timeless recording."

== Track listing ==
All songs written by Gordon Lightfoot, except "Me and Bobby McGee" by Kris Kristofferson and Fred Foster.

Side one

1. "Minstrel of the Dawn" – 3:26
2. "Me and Bobby McGee" – 3:38
3. "Approaching Lavender" – 2:56
4. "Saturday Clothes" – 3:20
5. "Cobwebs & Dust" – 3:20
6. "Poor Little Allison" – 2:30

Side two

1. "Sit Down Young Stranger" – 3:26
2. "If You Could Read My Mind" – 3:48
3. "Baby It's Allright" – 2:58
4. "Your Love's Return (Song for Stephen Foster)" – 3:55
5. "The Pony Man" – 3:27

== Chart performance ==
| Chart (1971) | Peak position |
|---|---|
| Australia (Kent Music Report) | 20 |
| Canadian RPM Top Albums | 8 |
| U.S. Billboard 200 | 12 |

== Certifications ==
| Region | Certification | Certified units/sales |
|---|---|---|
| Canada (Music Canada) | Gold | 50,000^{^} |
| United States (RIAA) | Gold | 500,000^{^} |
^{^} Shipments figures based on certification alone.

== Personnel ==
- Gordon Lightfoot - guitar, piano, vocals
- Red Shea - guitar
- Rick Haynes - bass

with:

- Ry Cooder - slide guitar on "Me and Bobby McGee", mandolin on "Cobwebs and Dust"
- Van Dyke Parks - harmonium on "Cobwebs and Dust"
- John Sebastian - electric guitar on "Baby It's Allright", autoharp on "Saturday Clothes", harmonica on "The Pony Man"
- Nick DeCaro - string arrangements on "Poor Little Allison", "If You Could Read My Mind" and "Your Love's Return"
- Randy Newman - string arrangement on "Minstrel of the Dawn" and "Approaching Lavender"
- Kris Kristofferson was rumored to have provided harmony vocals on "Me and Bobby McGee"

Technical

- Gary Brandt, Lee Herschberg - engineer
- Barry Feinstein, Tom Wilkes - design, photography
