= Early Morning Rain =

1965 single by Peter, Paul and Mary

Song by Gordon Lightfoot

from the album Lightfoot!
- Released: 1966
- Songwriter: Gordon Lightfoot

"Early Morning Rain", sometimes styled as "Early Mornin' Rain", is a song written, composed, and recorded by Canadian singer-songwriter Gordon Lightfoot. The song appears on his 1966 debut album Lightfoot! and, in a re-recorded version, on the 1975 compilation Gord's Gold.

== Background ==
Lightfoot wrote and composed the song in 1964, but its genesis took root during his 1960 sojourn in Westlake, Los Angeles. Throughout this time, Lightfoot sometimes became homesick and would go out to the Los Angeles International Airport on rainy days to watch the approaching aircraft. The imagery of the flights taking off into the overcast sky was still with him when, in 1964, he was caring for his 5-month-old baby son and he thought, "I'll put him over here in his crib, and I'll write myself a tune." "Early Morning Rain" was the result.

The lyrics describe someone down on his luck, standing at an airport fence and observing the thunderous takeoff of a Boeing 707 jet airliner. The general narrative of the song can be taken as a jet-age musical allegory to a hobo of yesteryear lurking around a railroad yard attempting to surreptitiously board and ride a freight train to get home. The song ends with the lyrics, "You can't jump a jet plane like you can a freight train", leaving this jet-age downtrodden man unable to get home.

== Notable recordings and performances ==
"Early Morning Rain"

Single by Peter, Paul & Mary
- B-side: "The Rising of the Moon"
- Released: September 1965
- Length: 3:02
- Label: Warner Bros.
- Songwriter: Gordon Lightfoot

The version by Ian & Sylvia reached No. 1 on the Canadian AC charts, August 2, 1965. Peter Paul and Mary's version of the song was recorded in August 1965, reaching No. 39 in Canada, and No. 91 on the Billboard Hot 100. The next year, George Hamilton IV's version hit No. 9 on the US country chart In April 1971, Oliver's version hit No. 38 on the US adult contemporary chart. Paul Weller took the song to No. 40 in the United Kingdom in 2005. Notably, Elvis Presley recorded and played the song live dozens of times. A French cover of this song, "Dans la brume du matin" (in the morning mist), was a hit in France for Joe Dassin. Bob Dylan covered the song in his 1970 album Self Portrait. The Warlocks (the precursor to the Grateful Dead) recorded "Early Morning Rain" during a studio session on November 3, 1965, at Golden State Recorders in San Francisco.
