= Beautiful (Gordon Lightfoot song) =

Single by Gordon Lightfoot

from the album Don Quixote
- B-side: "Don Quixote"
- Released: May 1972
- Genre: Soft rock, folk rock
- Label: Reprise
- Songwriter: Gordon Lightfoot
- Producer: Lenny Waronker

Gordon Lightfoot singles chronology
"Summer Side of Life" (1971)	"Beautiful" (1972)	"Alberta Bound" (1972)

"Beautiful" is a song by Canadian singer-songwriter Gordon Lightfoot. The song first appeared on Lightfoot's 1972 album Don Quixote, and was the first of two singles released. The album's title track appeared on the B-side.

== Reception ==
It reached number 13 in Canada. It peaked at number 58 on the U.S. Billboard Hot 100 and number 67 on the Cash Box Top 100 in July, 1972. The song also hit number 1 on the Canadian Adult Contemporary chart, his second of seven to do so, and number 30 on the U.S. Easy Listening chart.

=== Chart performance ===
Chart (1972)	Peak position
Canadian RPM Top Singles	13
Canadian RPM Adult Contemporary	1
US Billboard Easy Listening	30
US Billboard Hot 100	58

== In popular culture ==
In Vincent Gallo's 2003 film The Brown Bunny, the song is featured in a scene where Gallo's character Bud Clay is shown driving through a series of highways.
