= Summertime Dream =

Studio album by Gordon Lightfoot
- Released: June 1976
- Recorded: December 1975 – January 1976
- Studios: Eastern Sound Studios, Toronto
- Genre: Progressive folk
- Length: 37:26
- Label: Reprise
- Producers: Lenny Waronker, Gordon Lightfoot

Gordon Lightfoot chronology
Cold on the Shoulder (1975)	Summertime Dream (1976)	Endless Wire (1978)

Singles from Summertime Dream
- 1. "Summertime Dream" Released: July 1976; 2. "The Wreck of the Edmund Fitzgerald" Released: August 1976; 3. "Race Among the Ruins" Released: February 1977

Summertime Dream is Canadian singer Gordon Lightfoot's eleventh studio album, released on the Reprise Records label in 1976. It peaked at #1 on the Canadian RPM national album chart, and #12 on the US Billboard pop chart.

The album marked Lightfoot's commercial zenith in a remarkable period of popularity which had begun with the 1970 hit, "If You Could Read My Mind". He would not achieve the same level of commercial success through to his death in 2023.

The album shot to popularity on the back of the haunting ballad, "The Wreck of the Edmund Fitzgerald", which told the story of the final hours of the iron ore freighter SS Edmund Fitzgerald which had sunk on Lake Superior in November 1975. The song remains popular to this day and has been credited with making the sinking of Edmund Fitzgerald the most famous maritime incident in the history of the Great Lakes.

"The Wreck of the Edmund Fitzgerald" reached #1 in Canada on November 20, 1976. In the US, it peaked at #2 on the pop chart and #50 on the country chart while "Race Among the Ruins" peaked at #65 on the pop chart.

Professional ratings
Review scores
Source	Rating
Allmusic	link
Rolling Stone	(not rated) link

== Track listing ==
All songs composed by Gordon Lightfoot

=== Side 1 ===
1. "Race Among the Ruins" – 3:21
2. "The Wreck of the Edmund Fitzgerald" – 6:30
3. "I'm Not Supposed to Care" – 3:31
4. "I'd Do It Again" – 3:14
5. "Never Too Close" – 3:04
6. "Betty Called Me In" – 2:39 (1999 release only)

=== Side 2 ===
1. "Protocol" – 4:02
2. "The House You Live In" – 2:55
3. "Summertime Dream" – 2:30
4. "Spanish Moss" – 3:51
5. "Too Many Clues in This Room" – 4:49

== Chart performance ==
=== Weekly charts ===
Chart (1976)	Peak position
Australian Albums (Kent Music Report)	63
Canada Top Albums/CDs (RPM)	1
US Billboard 200	12

=== Year-end charts ===
Chart (1976)	Position
Canada Top Albums/CDs (RPM)	7

== Personnel ==
- Gordon Lightfoot - vocals, 6- and 12-string guitars
- Terry Clements - lead acoustic and electric guitars
- Pee Wee Charles - pedal steel guitar
- Rick Haynes - bass guitar
- Barry Keane - drums, percussion

Additional personnel

- Gene Martynec - Moog synthesizer
- Jim Gordon - drums on "The House You Live In"
