= Rainy Day People =

Single by Gordon Lightfoot

from the album Cold on the Shoulder
- B-side: "Cherokee Bend"
- Released: March 1975
- Genre: Folk
- Length: 2:48
- Label: Reprise
- Songwriter: Gordon Lightfoot
- Producer: Lenny Waronker

Gordon Lightfoot singles chronology
"Carefree Highway" (1974)	"Rainy Day People" (1975)	"The Wreck of the Edmund Fitzgerald" (1976)

"Rainy Day People" is a song written and recorded by Gordon Lightfoot, released on his 1975 album, Cold on the Shoulder, and also as a single. "Rainy Day People" went to number 26 on the Billboard Hot 100. It was Lightfoot's last of four songs to reach number one on the Easy Listening chart, spending one week at number one in May 1975.

== Personnel ==
- Gordon Lightfoot – vocal, acoustic guitar
- Terry Clements – acoustic guitar
- Red Shea – acoustic guitar
- Rick Haynes – bass
- Pee Wee Charles – pedal steel guitar
- Nick DeCaro – piano, string arrangement
- Jim Gordon – drums

== Chart performance ==
Chart (1975)	Peak position
Canadian RPM Top Singles	10
Canadian RPM Adult Contemporary	1
U.S. Billboard Hot 100	26
U.S. Billboard Easy Listening	1
U.S. Billboard Hot Country Singles	47

== See also ==
- List of number-one adult contemporary singles of 1975 (U.S.)
