= Lightfoot! =

Studio album by Gordon Lightfoot
- Released: January 1966
- Recorded: December 1964; New York City
- Genre: Folk
- Length: 38:13
- Label: United Artists
- Producer: John Court

Gordon Lightfoot chronology
Lightfoot! (1966)	The Way I Feel (1967)

Professional ratings
Review scores
Source	Rating
Allmusic	4.5/5 stars

Lightfoot! is the debut album by Canadian singer-songwriter Gordon Lightfoot. Although it was recorded in December 1964, the album was not released until January 1966 on the United Artists label.

At the 2017 Polaris Music Prize, the album won the public vote for the Heritage Prize in the 1960–1975 category.

== Track listing ==
All tracks are written by Gordon Lightfoot, except where noted.

Side one
No.	Title	Writer(s)	Length
1.	"Rich Man's Spiritual"		2:44
2.	"Long River"		2:46
3.	"The Way I Feel"		3:43
4.	"For Lovin' Me"		2:25
5.	"The First Time Ever I Saw Your Face"	Ewan MacColl	3:10
6.	"Changes"	Phil Ochs	2:30
7.	"Early Morning Rain"		3:04

Side two
No.	Title	Writer(s)	Length
1.	"Steel Rail Blues"		2:48
2.	"Sixteen Miles (To Seven Lakes)"		2:05
3.	"I'm Not Sayin'"		2:28
4.	"Pride of Man"	Hamilton Camp	2:41
5.	"Ribbon of Darkness"		2:39
6.	"Oh, Linda"		3:09
7.	"Peaceful Waters"		2:01

== Personnel ==
- Gordon Lightfoot - guitar, piano, vocals
- David Rea - second guitar
- Bruce Langhorne - second guitar ("Long River" and "Peaceful Waters")
- Bill Lee - bass

Cover photography by Barry Feinstein
