= Carefree Highway =

Single by Gordon Lightfoot

from the album Sundown
- B-side: "Seven Island Suite"
- Released: August 1974
- Recorded: November 1973
- Studio: Eastern Sound, Toronto
- Genre: Folk, country rock
- Length: 3:45
- Label: Reprise
- Songwriter: Gordon Lightfoot
- Producer: Lenny Waronker

Gordon Lightfoot singles chronology
"Sundown" (1974)	"Carefree Highway" (1974)	"Rainy Day People" (1975)

Audio
- "Carefree Highway" on YouTube

"Carefree Highway" is a song written by Gordon Lightfoot and was the second single release from his 1974 album, Sundown. It peaked at No. 10 on the Billboard Hot 100 and spent one week at No. 1 on the Easy Listening chart in October 1974.

The title comes from a section of Arizona State Route 74 in north Phoenix. He was driving from Flagstaff to Phoenix and saw a sign with those words pointing to the town of Carefree. Said Lightfoot, "I thought it would make a good title for a song. I wrote it down, put it in my suitcase and it stayed there for eight months." The song employs "Carefree Highway" as a metaphor for the state of mind where the singer seeks escape from his ruminations over a long ago failed affair with a woman named Ann. Lightfoot has stated that Ann actually was the name of a woman Lightfoot romanced when he was age 22: "It [was] one of those situations where you meet that one woman who knocks you out and then leaves you standing there and says she's on her way."

The song, however, is addressed to a personified "carefree highway," the highway to which the "old flame" mentioned in the song refers, which the singer has "got to see," and when he says, "I wonder if the years have closed her mind," he is wondering not about Ann, whom he can scarcely remember, but whether he is still capable of feeling the same elation he used to experience on the road — the road on which he now wants to "slip away." When the singer says "I guess it must be wanderlust or tryin' to get free," he is trying to explain to himself the attraction of the solitary nomadic life that used to give him, ironically, a "good old faithful feelin'."

== Chart performance ==
=== Weekly charts ===
Chart (1974)	Peak position
Australian KMR	74
Canadian RPM Top Singles	11
Canadian RPM Adult Contemporary	1
Canadian RPM Country Tracks	1
U.S. Billboard Hot 100	10
U.S. Billboard Easy Listening	1
U.S. Billboard Hot Country Singles	81

=== Year-end charts ===
Chart (1974)	Rank
Canada	121
U.S. (Joel Whitburn's Pop Annual)	102
