= Gordon Lightfoot =

Canadian singer-songwriter (1938–2023)

Gordon Lightfoot CC OOnt
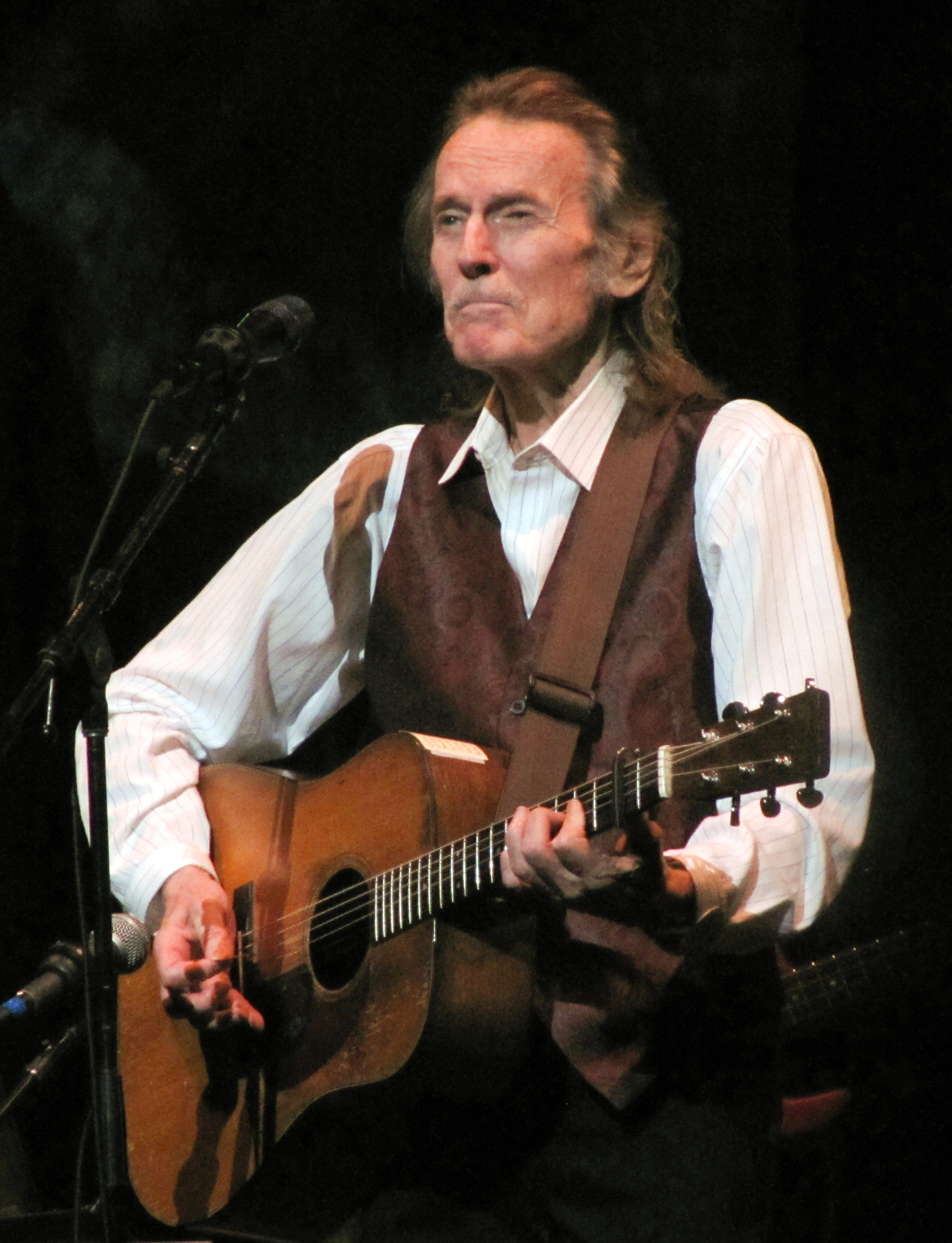
- Lightfoot performing in Interlochen, Michigan, in 2009

Background information
- Born: Gordon Meredith Lightfoot Jr. November 17, 1938; Orillia, Ontario, Canada
- Died: May 1, 2023 (aged 84) Toronto, Ontario, Canada
- Genres: Folk; soft rock; country; folk rock
- Occupations: Singer-songwriter; guitarist
- Instruments: Vocals; guitar; piano; percussion
- Years active: 1958–2022
- Labels: United Artists; Reprise; Warner Bros.; Linus; True North
- Formerly of: The Two-Tones

Gordon Meredith Lightfoot Jr. (November 17, 1938 – May 1, 2023) was a Canadian singer-songwriter who achieved worldwide success and helped define the singer-songwriter era of the 1970s. Widely considered one of Canada's greatest songwriters, he had numerous Gold and Platinum albums, and his songs have been covered by many of the world's most renowned musical artists. Lightfoot's biographer Nicholas Jennings wrote, "His name is synonymous with timeless songs about trains and shipwrecks, rivers and highways, lovers and loneliness."

Covers of Lightfoot's songs by other acts, including "For Lovin' Me", "Early Morning Rain", "Steel Rail Blues", "Home From The Forest", and "Ribbon of Darkness", a number one hit on the U.S. country chart for Marty Robbins, brought him recognition from the mid-1960s. Chart success with his own recordings began in Canada in 1962 with the No. 3 hit "(Remember Me) I'm the One" and led to a series of major hits at home and abroad throughout the 1970s. He topped the US Hot 100 or Adult Contemporary (AC) chart with "If You Could Read My Mind" (1970), "Sundown" (1974); "Carefree Highway" (1974), "Rainy Day People" (1975), and "The Wreck of the Edmund Fitzgerald" (1976).

Robbie Robertson of the Band described Lightfoot as "a national treasure". Bob Dylan said, "I can't think of any Gordon Lightfoot song I don't like. Every time I hear a song of his, it's like I wish it would last forever." Lightfoot was the featured musical performer at the opening ceremonies of the 1988 Winter Olympics and received numerous honours and awards during his career.

== Early life, family and education ==
Lightfoot was born in Orillia, Ontario, on November 17, 1938, to Jessie Vick Trill Lightfoot and Gordon Lightfoot Sr., who owned a local dry cleaning business. He was of Scottish descent. He had an older sister, Beverley (1935–2017). His mother recognized Lightfoot's musical talent early on and schooled him to become a successful child performer. He first performed publicly in grade four, singing the Irish-American lullaby "Too Ra Loo Ra Loo Ral", which was broadcast over his school's public address system during a parents' day event.

As a youth, he sang in the choir of Orillia's St. Paul's United Church under the direction of choirmaster Ray Williams. Lightfoot credited Williams with teaching him to sing with emotion and to have confidence in his voice. Lightfoot was a boy soprano; he appeared periodically on local Orillia radio, performed in local operettas and oratorios, and gained exposure through various Kiwanis music festivals. At the age of twelve, after winning a competition for boys whose voices had not yet changed, he made his first appearance at Massey Hall in Toronto, a venue he would ultimately play over 170 more times throughout his career.

As a teenager, Lightfoot learned piano and taught himself to play drums and percussion. He performed live in Muskoka, a resort area north of Orillia, singing "for a couple of beers". Lightfoot performed extensively throughout high school, Orillia District Collegiate & Vocational Institute (ODCVI), and taught himself to play folk guitar. A formative influence on his music at this time was 19th-century master American songwriter Stephen Foster.

Lightfoot relocated to Los Angeles in 1958 to study jazz composition and orchestration for two years at the Westlake College of Music.

== Career ==
=== Beginnings ===
To support himself while in California, Lightfoot sang on demonstration records and wrote, arranged, and produced commercial jingles. Among his influences was the folk music of Pete Seeger, Bob Gibson, Ian & Sylvia Tyson, and The Weavers. Homesick for Toronto, he returned there in 1960 and lived in Canada thereafter, though some of his recording and much of his touring were done in the United States.

After his return to Canada, Lightfoot performed with the Singin' Swingin' Eight, a group featured on the CBC's Country Hoedown TV series, and with the Gino Silvi Singers. He soon became known at Toronto folk-oriented coffee houses. In 1961, Lightfoot released two singles, both recorded at RCA in Nashville and produced by Louis Innis and Art Snider, that were local hits in Toronto and received some airplay elsewhere in Canada and the northeastern United States. "(Remember Me) I'm the One" reached No. 3 on CHUM radio in Toronto in July 1962 and was a top 20 hit on Montreal's CKGM, then an influential Canadian Top 40 station. The follow-up single was "Negotiations"/"It's Too Late, He Wins"; it reached No. 27 on CHUM in December. He sang with Terry Whelan in a duo called the Two-Tones/Two-Timers. They recorded a live album, released in 1962, Two-Tones at the Village Corner (1962, Chateau CLP-1012).

In 1963, Lightfoot travelled in Europe and for one year in the UK hosted the BBC's Country and Western Show TV series before returning to Canada in 1964. He appeared at the Mariposa Folk Festival and started to develop his reputation as a songwriter. Ian and Sylvia Tyson recorded "Early Mornin' Rain" and "For Lovin' Me"; a year later both songs were recorded by Peter, Paul and Mary. Other performers covering one or both of these songs included Elvis Presley, Bob Dylan, Chad & Jeremy, George Hamilton IV, the Clancy Brothers, The Grateful Dead and the Johnny Mann Singers. Established recording artists such as Marty Robbins ("Ribbon of Darkness"), Judy Collins ("Early Morning Rain"), Richie Havens and Spyder Turner ("I Can't Make It Anymore"), and the Kingston Trio ("Early Morning Rain") all achieved chart success with Lightfoot's material.

=== 1960s ===
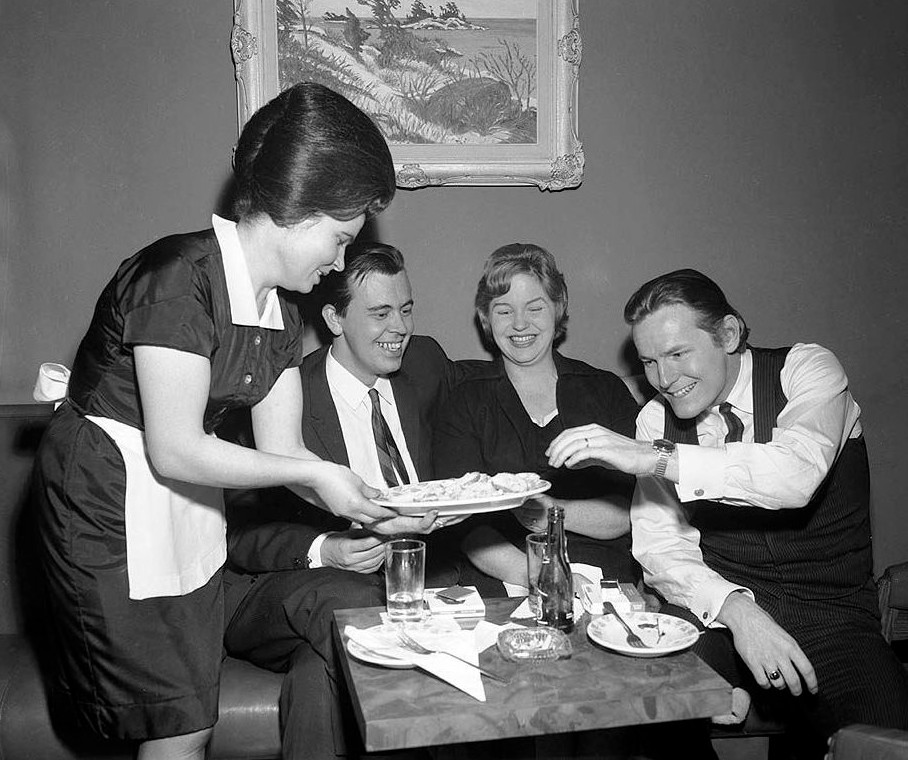
Lightfoot, right, at a music industry function in Toronto in 1965

In 1965, Lightfoot signed a management contract with Albert Grossman, who also represented many prominent American folk performers, and signed a recording contract with United Artists who released his version of "I'm Not Sayin'" as a single. Appearances at the Newport Folk Festival, The Tonight Show starring Johnny Carson, and New York's Town Hall increased his following and bolstered his reputation. 1966 marked the release of his debut album Lightfoot!, which was recorded in New York City and brought him greater exposure as both a singer and a songwriter. The album featured many now-famous songs, including "For Lovin' Me", "Early Mornin' Rain", "Steel Rail Blues", and "Ribbon of Darkness". On the strength of the Lightfoot! album, blending Canadian and universal themes, Lightfoot became one of the first Canadian singers to achieve definitive home-grown stardom without having to move permanently to the United States to develop it. Lightfoot also recorded in Nashville at Forest Hills Music Studio ("Bradley's Barn") run by Owen Bradley and his son Jerry during the 1960s.

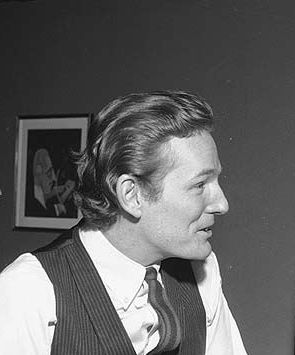
Lightfoot, 1965

To kick off Canada's Centennial year, the CBC commissioned Lightfoot to write the "Canadian Railroad Trilogy" for a special broadcast on January 1, 1967. Between 1966 and 1969, Lightfoot recorded four additional albums at United Artists: The Way I Feel (1967), Did She Mention My Name? (1968), Back Here on Earth (1968), and the live Sunday Concert (1969), and consistently placed singles in the Canadian top 40, including "Go-Go Round", "Spin, Spin", and "The Way I Feel". His biggest hit of the era was a cover of Bob Dylan's "Just Like Tom Thumb's Blues", which peaked at No. 3 on the Canadian charts in December 1965. Did She Mention My Name? featured "Black Day in July" about the 1967 Detroit riot. Weeks later, upon the assassination of Martin Luther King Jr. on April 4, radio stations in thirty states pulled the song for "fanning the flames", even though the song was a plea for racial harmony. Lightfoot stated at the time radio station owners cared more about playing songs "that make people happy" and not those "that make people think."

Unhappy at a lack of support from United Artists, he moved to Warner Bros. Records, scoring his first major international hit early in 1971 with "If You Could Read My Mind". Lightfoot's albums prior to this were well received abroad but did not produce hit singles outside Canada. Until 1971, he was better known in the US as a songwriter than a performer but was to find commercial success there before being fully appreciated in his home country.

Lightfoot's success as a live performer continued to grow throughout the late 1960s. He embarked on his first Canadian national tour in 1967 and went on to tour Europe in addition to his North American dates through the mid-70s. He was also well-received on two tours of Australia.

=== 1970s ===
"If You Could Read My Mind" sold over a million copies and was awarded a gold record. It had originally appeared on the 1970 album Sit Down Young Stranger. After the song's success, the album was reissued under the new title If You Could Read My Mind. It then reached No. 5 in the US and represented the turning point in Lightfoot's career. The album also featured his version of "Me and Bobby McGee", as well as "The Pony Man" and "Minstrel of the Dawn".

Over the next seven years, he recorded a series of albums that established him as a major singer-songwriter:

- Summer Side of Life (1971), with the title track, "Ten Degrees and Getting Colder", "Cotton Jenny", "Talking in Your Sleep", and a re-working of one of his early 1960s songs, "Cabaret"
- Don Quixote (1972), with "Beautiful", "Looking at the Rain", "Christian Island (Georgian Bay)", and the title track
- Old Dan's Records (1972), his first frontline album to be recorded in Toronto, with the title track, "That Same Old Obsession", "You Are What I Am", "It's Worth Believin'" and "Can't Depend on Love"
- Sundown (1974), known for the title track and "Carefree Highway", plus "The Watchman's Gone", "High and Dry", "Circle of Steel", and "Too Late for Prayin'"
- Cold on the Shoulder (1975), with the title track, "All the Lovely Ladies", "Fine as Fine Can Be", "Cherokee Bend", and "Rainy Day People"
- The double compilation Gord's Gold (1975) containing his major Reprise hits to that point and twelve new versions of his most popular songs from his United Artists era (as UA released compilation albums in light of his success at Warner)
- Summertime Dream (1976) including "The Wreck of the Edmund Fitzgerald" and "I'm Not Supposed to Care", "Race Among the Ruins", "Spanish Moss", and "Never Too Close"
- Endless Wire (1978) with "Daylight Katy", "Dreamland", a new version of "The Circle Is Small", and the title track

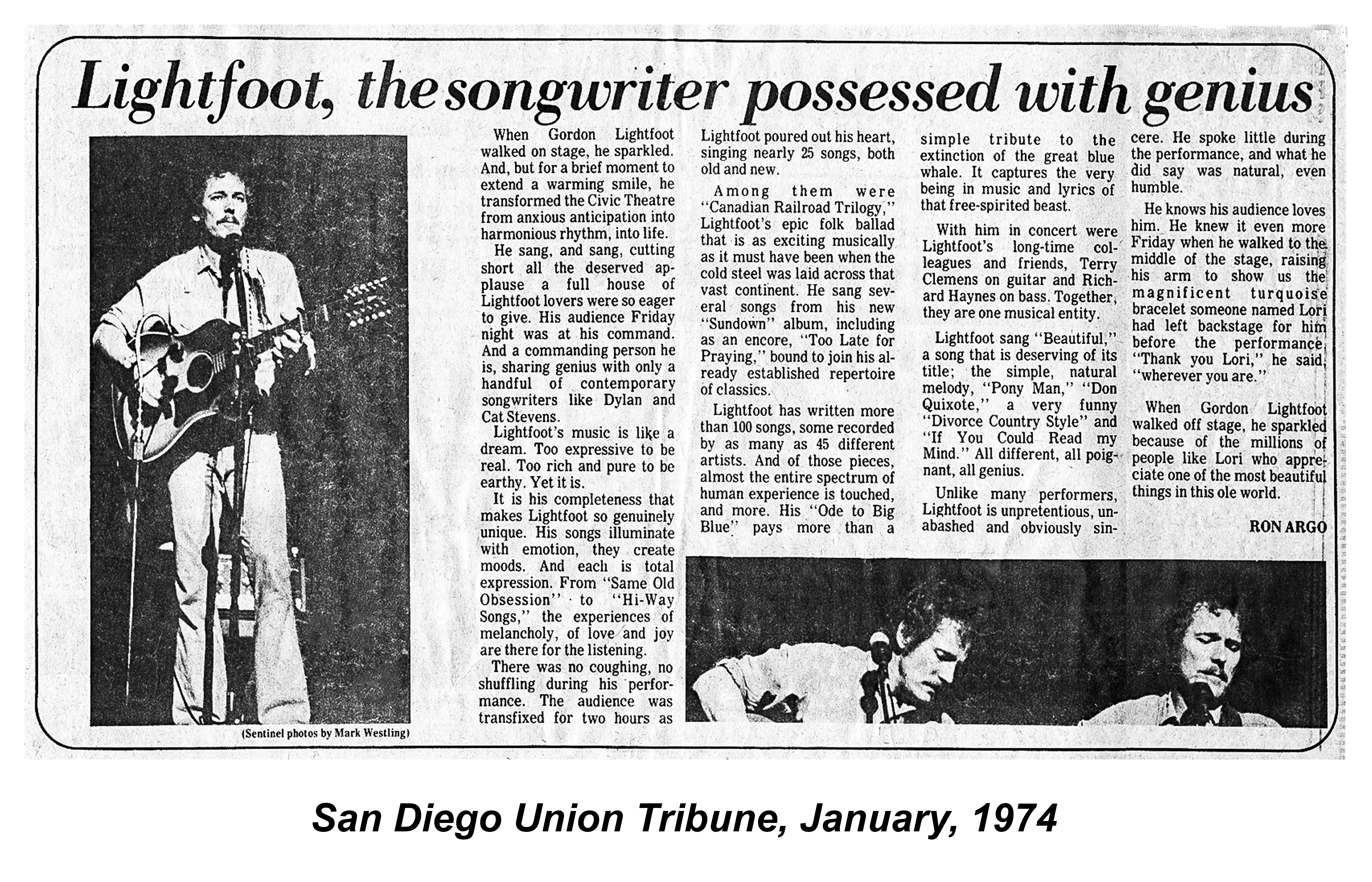
Gordon Lightfoot in concert in San Diego in 1974

During the 1970s, Lightfoot's songs covered a wide range of subjects, including "Don Quixote", referencing Cervantes' famous literary character, "Ode to Big Blue", about the widespread killing of whales, "Carefree Highway", about the freedom of the open road, "Protocol", about the futility of war, and "Alberta Bound".

In 1972, Lightfoot contracted Bell's palsy, a condition that left his face partially paralysed for a time. The affliction curtailed his touring schedule but Lightfoot nevertheless continued to deliver major hits: in June 1974 his classic single "Sundown" went to No.1 on the American and Canadian charts. It would be his only number one hit in the United States. He performed it twice on NBC's The Midnight Special. The follow-up "Carefree Highway" (inspired by Arizona State Route 74 in Phoenix, Arizona) also charted Top 10 in both countries.

In 1974, Lightfoot's longtime business manager Al Mair set up Attic Records, which would become the largest and most influential Canadian independent record label.

Late in 1975, Lightfoot read a Newsweek magazine article reporting on the loss of the SS Edmund Fitzgerald, which sank on November 10, 1975, on Lake Superior during a severe storm with the loss of all 29 crew members. The lyrics he wrote for "The Wreck of the Edmund Fitzgerald", released the following year, were substantially based on facts found in the article and elsewhere. It reached number two on the United States Billboard chart and hit number one in Canada. Lightfoot appeared at several 25th anniversary memorial services of the sinking and stayed in personal contact with the family members of the men who died.

In 1978, Lightfoot had a top 40 hit in the United States with "The Circle Is Small", which reached the top 5 on the adult contemporary chart. It was his last major hit.

=== 1980s and 1990s ===
During the 1980s and the 1990s, Lightfoot recorded six more original albums: Dream Street Rose (1980), Shadows (1982), Salute (1983), East of Midnight (1986), Waiting for You (1993), and A Painter Passing Through (1998).

With the title cut a middling hit on the AC chart, Dream Street Rose continues the folk-pop sound Lightfoot established during the previous decade. It also includes "Ghosts of Cape Horn" and the Leroy Van Dyke standard "The Auctioneer" that was a concert staple for Lightfoot from the mid-1960s to the 1980s. Shadows represents a departure from the acoustic sound of his guitar playing in the 1970s and emphasizes an adult-contemporary sound. The title track, "Heaven Help the Devil", "Thank You for the Promises", "She's Not The Same", and "I'll Do Anything" suggest an underlying sadness and resignation. The 1982 single "Baby Step Back" marked his last time in the US top 50.

After overcoming a long-standing problem with alcohol, Lightfoot released the mostly electric Salute in 1983. It yielded no hit songs and unlike his previous efforts sold poorly. The 1986 follow-up, East of Midnight, emphasized adult contemporary songs, and the lead single, "Anything for Love", was a hit on Billboard's Adult Contemporary chart and also made the Pop and Country charts.

In April 1987, Lightfoot filed a lawsuit against composer Michael Masser, claiming that Masser's melody for the song "The Greatest Love of All", versions of which were recorded and released by George Benson in 1977 and Whitney Houston in 1985, had stolen 24 bars from Lightfoot's 1971 hit song "If You Could Read My Mind". The transitional section that begins "I decided long ago never to walk in anyone's shadow" of the Masser song has the same melody as "I never thought I could feel this way and I got to say that I just don't get it; I don't know where we went wrong but the feeling's gone and I just can't get it back" of Lightfoot's song. Lightfoot later stated that he did not want people thinking that he had stolen his melody from Masser. The case was settled out of court and Masser issued a public apology.

Lightfoot concluded the 1980s with Gord's Gold Volume II, made up mostly of new versions of songs that were not part of the first Gord's Gold project in 1975. Though commercially successful, the contrast between his vocals on the re-recorded tracks and the originals dramatically underscored just how much thinner his voice had become in the years since his radio peak. Lightfoot performed with Ian Tyson at the opening ceremonies of the 1988 Winter Olympics at McMahon Stadium in Calgary that same year.

During the 1990s, Lightfoot returned to his acoustic roots and recorded two albums. Waiting for You (1993) includes songs such as "Restless", "I'd Rather Press On", and a cover of Bob Dylan's "Ring Them Bells". 1998's A Painter Passing Through continued in a style more reminiscent of his early recordings, although his voice was not strong and he relied more on outside material (Ian Tyson's "Red Velvet" and a new song written for him, "I Used to Be a Country Singer"). Throughout the decade, Lightfoot played between 50 and 75 concerts each year. In 1999 Rhino Records released Songbook, a four-CD boxed set of Lightfoot recordings with rare and unreleased tracks from the 1960s, 1970s, 1980s, and 1990s plus a small hardback booklet describing how he wrote his songs with facts about his career as well.

=== 2000s ===
In April 2000, Lightfoot taped a live concert in Reno, Nevada; an edited one-hour version was broadcast by the CBC in October, and on PBS across the United States. PBS stations offered a videotape of the concert as a pledge gift, and a DVD was released in 2001 in Europe and North America, making it the first Lightfoot concert video released. In April 2001, he closed the Tin Pan South Legends concert at Ryman Auditorium in Nashville. In May, he performed "Ring Them Bells" at Massey Hall in honour of Dylan's 60th birthday.

By January 2002, Lightfoot had written 30 new songs for his next album. He recorded guitar and vocal demos of some of these new songs. In September, before the second concert of a two-night stand in Orillia, Lightfoot suffered severe stomach pain and was airlifted to McMaster University Medical Centre in Hamilton. He underwent emergency vascular surgery for a ruptured abdominal aortic aneurysm, and he remained in serious condition in the Intensive Care Unit (ICU). Lightfoot endured a six-week coma and a tracheotomy and underwent four surgeries. His remaining 2002 concert dates were cancelled. More than three months after being taken to McMaster, Lightfoot was released in December to continue his recovery at home.

In 2003, Lightfoot underwent follow-up surgery to continue the treatment of his abdominal condition. In November he signed a new recording contract with Linus Entertainment and began rehearsing with his band for the first time since his illness. Also in 2003, Borealis Records, a label related to Linus Entertainment, released Beautiful: A Tribute to Gordon Lightfoot. On this album, various artists, including The Cowboy Junkies, Bruce Cockburn, Jesse Winchester, Maria Muldaur, and The Tragically Hip interpreted Lightfoot's songs. The final track on the album, "Lightfoot", was the only song not previously released by Lightfoot. It was composed and performed by Aengus Finnan.

In January 2004, Lightfoot completed work on Harmony, which he had mostly recorded prior to his illness. It was his 19th original album and included a single and video of "Inspiration Lady". Other notable entries are "Clouds of Loneliness", "Sometimes I Wish", "Flyin' Blind", and "No Mistake About It". The album also contains the upbeat yet reflective track, "End of All Time". In July 2004, he made a surprise comeback performance, his first since falling ill, at Mariposa in Orillia, performing "I'll Tag Along" solo. In August he performed a five-song solo set in Peterborough, Ontario, at a flood relief benefit. In November Lightfoot made his long-awaited return to the concert stage with two sold-out benefit shows in Hamilton. Lightfoot returned to the music business with his new album selling well and an appearance on Canadian Idol, where the six top contestants each performed a song of his, culminating in a group performance with their own instruments of his Canadian Railroad Trilogy. He returned to the road in 2005 on his Better Late Than Never Tour.

In July 2005 Lightfoot performed at the Canadian Live 8 concert in Barrie, Ontario.

On September 14, 2006, during a performance in Harris, Michigan, Lightfoot suffered a minor stroke that temporarily left him without the use of the middle and ring fingers on his right hand. He returned to performing nine days later and briefly used a substitute guitarist for more difficult guitar work. Full recovery took longer, and Lightfoot noted "I fought my way back in seven or eight months". By 2007, Lightfoot had full use of his right hand and played all of the guitar parts in concert as he originally wrote them.

=== 2010s and final work ===
In February 2010, Lightfoot was the victim of a death hoax originating on Twitter, when then-CTV journalist David Akin posted on Twitter and Facebook that Lightfoot had died. Lightfoot was at a dental appointment at the time the rumours spread and found out when listening to the radio on his drive home. Lightfoot dispelled those rumours by phoning Charles Adler of CJOB live on-air, and made clear that he was alive and well.

Lightfoot performed at the 100th Grey Cup at Rogers Centre in November 2012, performing "Canadian Railroad Trilogy", and was extremely well received. Lightfoot made his first tour of the United Kingdom in almost forty years in 2016, playing eleven dates across England, Scotland, and Ireland. In a 2016 interview with The Canadian Press Lightfoot said: "At this age, my challenge is doing the best show I can ... I'm very much improved from where I was and the seriousness with which I take it."

Lightfoot played at Canada's 150th birthday celebration on Parliament Hill, July 1, 2017, introduced by Prime Minister Justin Trudeau. The Prime Minister mentioned that Lightfoot had played the same stage exactly 50 years earlier, for Canada's 100th birthday. Lightfoot's 2019 tour was interrupted when he was injured while working out in a gym. In March 2020 his concert schedule was delayed by governmental restrictions during the coronavirus pandemic.

Lightfoot had said in 2016 that he would not return to songwriting late in life as it was "such an isolating thing" earlier in his career, affecting his family life. However, in 2020 Lightfoot released his 20th studio album, Solo, unaccompanied by other musicians, 54 years after his debut album. It was put out by Warner Music Canada, marking Lightfoot's return to Warner.

Two weeks after his death in 2023, it was announced that his 2016 concert performance at Royal Albert Hall would be released in July 2023 as the live album At Royal Albert Hall.

== Sound and legacy ==
Lightfoot's sound, in the studio and on tour, was centred on his baritone voice and folk-based twelve-string acoustic guitar. From 1965 to 1970, lead guitarist Red Shea was an important supporting player, with bassists Paul Wideman and John Stockfish filling out the arrangements.

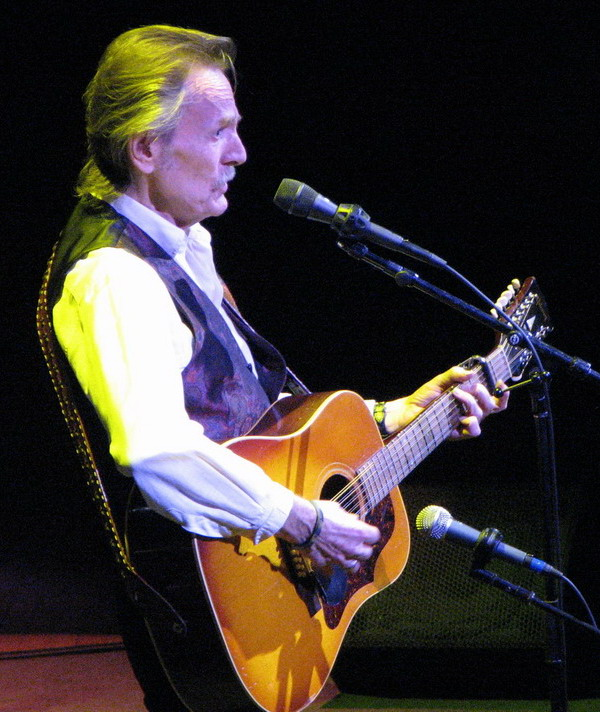
Performing in Toronto, 2008, playing his twelve-string guitar

In 1968 bassist Rick Haynes joined the band, and lead guitarist Terry Clements signed on three years later. After Shea left the band, he continued to appear on the albums and played on several of Lightfoot's hits. Shea also hosted a CBC variety show, worked with Ian Tyson, and became band leader for Tommy Hunter's TV show in the 1980s on CBC. Haynes and Clements remained with Lightfoot and made up the core of his band.

In 1975, Ed Ringwald (billed by Lightfoot as Pee Wee Charles) added pedal steel guitar to the band, and drummer Barry Keane joined that same year. In 1981, keyboardist Mike Heffernan completed the ensemble. This five-piece backup band remained intact until 1987, when Charles left to operate a radio station in Southern Ontario.

Three former members of Lightfoot's band died over the years: Red Shea in 2008, Clements at 63 in 2011, and John Stockfish in 2012.

Haynes, Keane, and Heffernan continued touring and recording with Lightfoot, with Carter Lancaster replacing Clements in 2011.

Alexander Carpenter, professor of musicology at the University of Alberta, noted the number of tributes to Lightfoot in the media that held him as "quintessentially Canadian" and questioned whether this nationalist and nostalgic view [blurred] "the reality that Lightfoot was a musician who had a much wider influence on the popular music scene of the 1970s, well beyond Canada’s borders". Carpenter contended that Lightfoot both romanticized Canadian history and looked more deeply into the country's past – an aspect of his music that has been "largely lost in the effusive eulogies in the media". Lightfoot's gentle, sentimental delivery was noted by Carpenter as evoking nostalgia, but that this was not necessarily a "compelling or accurate portrait of Canada", with the article concluding: "Simply casting Lightfoot as an exemplar of Canadian-ness overshadows Lightfoot's legacy. He was a songsmith and a musician who toiled for his entire career – spanning nearly six decades – to bring words and music together in meaningful and enduring ways."

In 2025, the City of Pickering commissioned sculptor Geordie Lishman to create Gordon’s Guitar, an interactive 12-string guitar sculpture installed in Ernie Stroud Park as a permanent memorial.

== Personal life and death ==
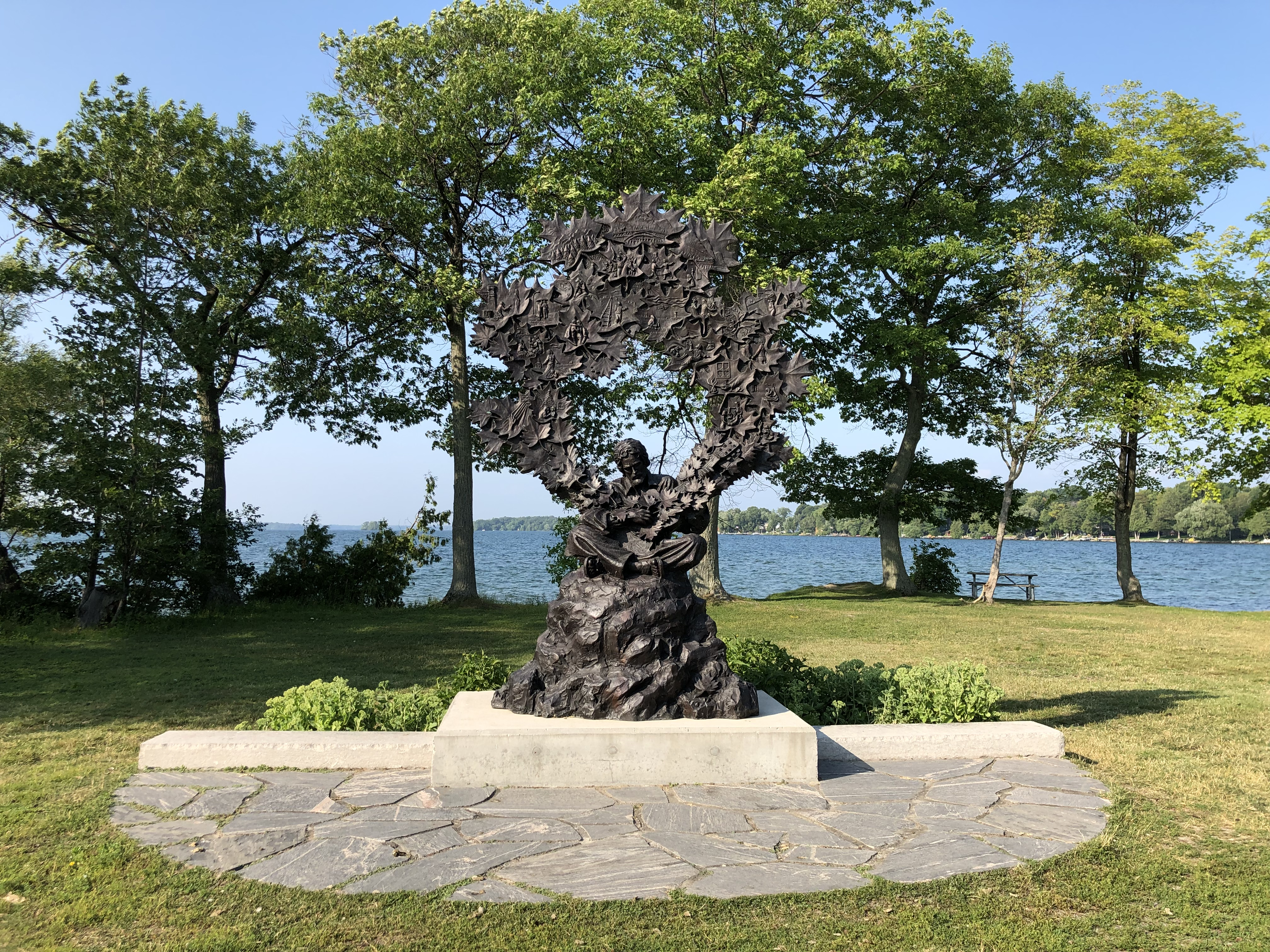
"Golden leaves" monument for Lightfoot, Orillia

Lightfoot was married three times. His first marriage in 1963 was to Brita Ingegerd Olaisson, a Swede, with whom he had two children. They divorced in 1973, the marriage ending in part because of his infidelity. Lightfoot acknowledged that he found fidelity difficult in a long-distance relationship brought on by touring, which contributed to the failure of at least two relationships.

"If You Could Read My Mind" was written in reflection upon his disintegrating marriage. At the request of his daughter, he performed the lyrics with a slight change: the line "I'm just trying to understand the feelings that you lack" is altered to "I'm just trying to understand the feelings that we lack." He said in an interview that the difficulty with writing songs inspired by personal stories is that there is not always the emotional distance and clarity to make lyrical improvements such as the one his daughter suggested.

Lightfoot was unmarried for 16 years and had two other children from relationships between his first and second marriages.

In the early 1970s, Lightfoot was involved with Cathy Smith; their volatile relationship inspired "Sundown" and "Rainy Day People" among others. "Cathy was a great lady," Lightfoot told The Globe and Mail after her death. "Men were drawn to her, and she used to make me jealous. But I don't have a bad thing to say about her." Smith later became notorious as the person who injected John Belushi with a fatal speedball.

In 1989, he married Elizabeth Moon. They had two children. They divorced in 2011 after a separation of nine years.

Lightfoot married for a third time in 2014 at Toronto's Rosedale United Church, to Kim Hasse.

To stay in shape to meet the demands of touring and public performing, Lightfoot worked out in a gym six days per week but declared in 2012 that he was "fully prepared to go whenever I'm taken." He calmly stated, "I've been almost dead a couple times, once almost for real ... I have more incentive to continue now because I feel I'm on borrowed time, in terms of age."

Lightfoot's band members remained loyal to him as both musicians and friends, recording and performing with him for as long as 55 years.

Lightfoot was a long-time resident of Toronto, having settled in the Rosedale neighbourhood in the 1970s, which once hosted an infamous after-party following a Maple Leaf Gardens date on Bob Dylan's Rolling Thunder Revue tour. In 1999, he purchased his final home in the Bridle Path neighbourhood, where he would eventually live across the street from fellow musician Drake who purchased property in the mid-2010s, and at various times down the street from both Mick Jagger and Prince.

Lightfoot was a lifelong fan of the Toronto Maple Leafs and was made an honorary captain of the team for the 1991–92 season.

In his last two years of touring, Lightfoot shortened his show to one hour, and remained seated for the last few dates he performed. He played what turned out to be his final concert on October 30, 2022, in Winnipeg. Remaining dates were postponed to 2023, but as his health declined, there were further postponements. While hospitalized in April, Lightfoot cancelled his entire 2023 tour. Lightfoot died of natural causes two weeks later at Sunnybrook Health Sciences Centre in Toronto on May 1, 2023, at the age of 84.

The Mariners' Church in Detroit (the "Maritime Sailors' Cathedral" mentioned in "The Wreck of the Edmund Fitzgerald") honoured Lightfoot the day after his death by ringing its bell a total of 30 times, 29 for each of the crewmen lost on the Edmund Fitzgerald and the final time for Lightfoot himself. Additionally, the Split Rock Lighthouse, which overlooks Lake Superior in Minnesota, shone its light in honour of Lightfoot on May 3.

In the days after his death, a series of tribute concerts took place in his hometown of Orillia, one of them previously planned. On May 6, the local opera house hosted Leisa Way & the Wayward Wind Band, a previously planned show that paid tribute to Lightfoot that became a memorial show of sorts. It sold out following his death. A day later, a public visitation was held at St. Paul's United Church that drew more than 2,400 people. On May 8, 2023, a private funeral was held for Lightfoot at St. Paul's United Church. His body was later cremated, and his ashes were buried next to his parents at St. Andrew's and St. James' Cemetery in Orillia.

A tribute concert took place at Massey Hall on May 23, 2024, featuring performances of Lightfoot songs performed by his band, who continue to tour as The Lightfoot Band, and Blue Rodeo, City and Colour, Julian Taylor, Kathleen Edwards, Murray McLauchlan, Serena Ryder, Tom Wilson, Allison Russell, Burton Cummings, Tom Cochrane, Aysanabee, William Prince, Sylvia Tyson, Geddy Lee and Alex Lifeson, and The Good Brothers.

== Honours and awards ==
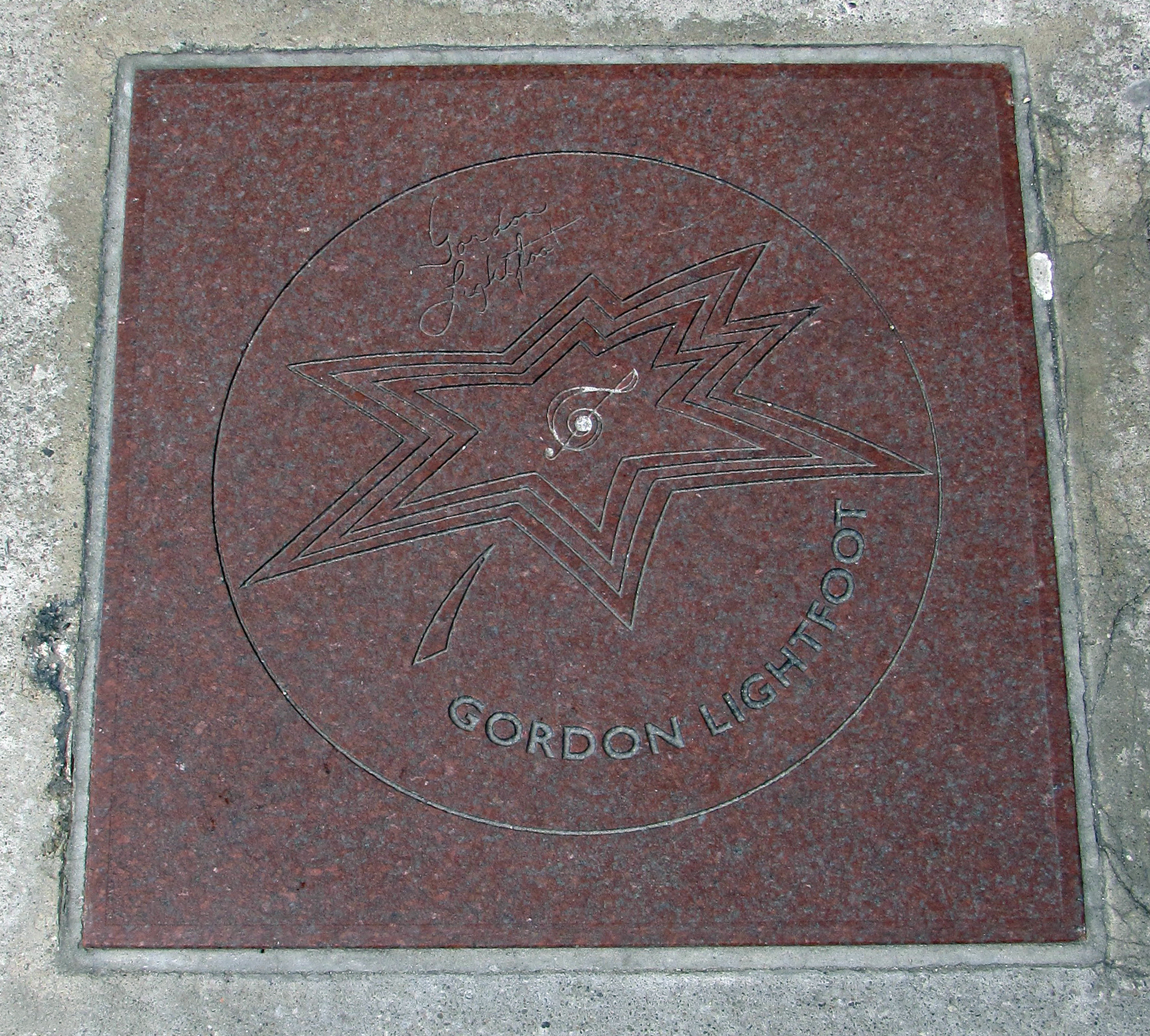
Lightfoot's star on Canada's Walk of Fame

As an individual, apart from various awards associated with his albums and singles, Gordon Lightfoot received sixteen Juno Awards—for top folk singer in 1965, 1966, 1968, 1969, 1973, 1974, 1975, 1976, and 1977, for top male vocalist in 1967, 1970, 1971, 1972, and 1973, and as composer of the year in 1972 and 1976. He received ASCAP awards for songwriting in 1971, 1974, 1976, and 1977 and was nominated for five Grammy Awards. In 1974 Lightfoot's song "Sundown" was named pop record of the year by the Music Operators of America. In 1980 he was named Canadian male recording artist of the decade for his work during the 1970s.

Lightfoot was celebrated in song by fellow Canadians The Guess Who on their 1968 album Wheatfield Soul with the track "Lightfoot." The opening verse mentions John Stockfish and Red Shea leaving no doubt about the identity of this Lightfoot who "is an artist painting Sistine masterpieces." The track also interjects titles of some of Lightfoot's songs in a line of its lyrics, such as "... the 'Go-Go (girl went) Round', and our heads were in a spin, I thought about the 'Crossroads', in the 'Early Morning Rain', and 'Rosanna'".

Lightfoot was chosen as the celebrity captain of the Toronto Maple Leafs for the NHL's 75th anniversary season in 1991–1992.

Lightfoot was inducted into the Canadian Music Hall of Fame in 1986 and the Canadian Country Music Hall of Fame in 2001. He was inducted into Canada's Walk of Fame in 1998. In May 2003, he was made a Companion of the Order of Canada. Lightfoot was a member of the Order of Ontario, the highest honour in the province of Ontario. In 1977, he received the Vanier Award from the Canadian Jaycees. In 2007, Canada Post honoured Lightfoot and three other Canadian music artists (Paul Anka, Joni Mitchell, and Anne Murray) with postage stamps highlighting their names and images. On June 24, 2012, Lightfoot was inducted into the Songwriters Hall of Fame in a New York City ceremony, along with Bob Seger.

Lightfoot received an honorary Doctor of Laws degree from Trent University in spring 1979 and on June 6, 2015, Lightfoot received an honorary doctorate of music in his hometown of Orillia from Lakehead University.

In November 1997, the Governor General's Performing Arts Award, Canada's highest honour in the performing arts, was bestowed on Lightfoot. On February 6, 2012, Lightfoot was presented with the Queen Elizabeth II Diamond Jubilee Medal by the Lieutenant Governor of Ontario.

Between 1986 and 1988, Lightfoot's friend, the realist painter Ken Danby (1940–2007), worked on a large (60 × 48 inches) portrait of Lightfoot dressed in the white suit he wore on the cover of the album East of Midnight. The picture is backlit by the sun, creating a visually attractive image of the singer.

On June 16, 2014, Lightfoot received a Lifetime Achievement Award by SOCAN at the 2014 SOCAN Awards in Toronto.

On October 23, 2015, Lightfoot was honoured with a 4-metre tall bronze sculpture created by Timothy Schmalz in his hometown of Orillia, Ontario. The sculpture, called Golden Leaves—A Tribute to Gordon Lightfoot, features Lightfoot sitting cross-legged, playing an acoustic guitar underneath an arch of golden maple leaves. Many of the leaves allude to scenes from Lightfoot's 1975 greatest hits album, Gord's Gold.

In 2017, Lightfoot rated fifth in the CBC's list of the 25 best Canadian songwriters ever, and musician Ronnie Hawkins called Lightfoot the greatest songwriter in the world. That same year, Penguin Random House Canada published the Gordon Lightfoot biography, Lightfoot, written by journalist Nicholas Jennings and it topped the national bestseller lists. Lightfoot was awarded the Gold Medal of the Royal Canadian Geographical Society.

He was the subject of the 2019 documentary Gordon Lightfoot: If You Could Read My Mind.

In 2022, Lightfoot received the Golden Plate Award of the American Academy of Achievement.

== Discography ==
- Lightfoot! (1966)
- The Way I Feel (1967)
- Did She Mention My Name? (1968)
- Back Here on Earth (1968)
- Sunday Concert (1969)
- Sit Down Young Stranger (aka If You Could Read My Mind) (1970)
- Summer Side of Life (1971)
- Don Quixote (1972)
- Old Dan's Records (1972)
- Sundown (1974)
- Cold on the Shoulder (1975)
- Summertime Dream (1976)
- Endless Wire (1978)
- Dream Street Rose (1980)
- Shadows (1982)
- Salute (1983)
- East of Midnight (1986)
- Waiting for You (1993)
- A Painter Passing Through (1998)
- Harmony (2004)
- Solo (2020)

== See also ==
- Canadian rock
- Music of Canada
