= Red Shea (guitarist) =

Canadian folk guitarist (1938–2008)

Red Shea (born Laurice Milton Pouliot; May 9, 1938–June 10, 2008) was a renowned Canadian folk guitarist. Over his career, he helped define the sounds of artists such as Gordon Lightfoot and Ian and Sylvia Tyson, and was a regular on the television show of Canadian Country music singer Tommy Hunter. In 1965, he began working in the studio with Gordon Lightfoot, and toured with him until 1971, when he left the touring band to focus on his family. He continued working with Lightfoot in the studio and briefly toured with Lightfoot and his band during his 1975 tour. The same year, he left and began working with Ian Tyson. Later on, he hosted his own Canadian variety show and became the band leader for Tommy Hunter's television show in the early 1980s. Red Shea died of pancreatic cancer on June 10, 2008, just a month after his 70th birthday.

== Career ==
Shea was a self-taught musician. In Saskatchewan in the late 1950s, Shea formed the Red and Les Trio with his brother Les and bassist Bill Gibbs, making appearances on Country Hoedown, a CBC Musical variety show. The trio recorded "Marlene" (1958) with the Regency Records label. Later, Shea played backup guitar with the Bluegrass band The Good Brothers, who were from Richmond Hill, Ontario.

On the folk circuit, Shea befriended Gordon Lightfoot, for whom he played lead guitar between 1965 and 1975. Shea was a "pivotal figure" in Lightfoot's early career, according to music journalist Jerry LeBlanc. His guitar solo in a live performance recording of "Canadian Railroad Trilogy" at Massey Hall in 1969 is particularly notable.

Shea appears on several of Lightfoot's records, including The Way I Feel, Did She Mention My Name, Sit Down Young Stranger, Summer Side of Life, Sundown, Cold on the Shoulder and Gord’s Gold.

Shea later joined the Ian and Sylvia Tyson's band The Great Speckled Bird, becoming musical director of the Ian Tyson Show in the 1970s. In the 1980s, Shea became band leader on the Tommy Hunter show, which ran until 1992.

== Influence ==
Folk-rock artists such as Dan Fogelberg and Randy Bachman have cited Shea as a major influence, with Bachman remarking that "Red Shea was the ultimate extra guitar on Gordon Lightfoot's records and stage performances. He augmented every song with some sparkle and magic and made Gordon sound and look good".
