= Tony Rice discography =

- Studio albums: 37
- Compilation albums: 5

This article presents the discography of influential guitar player and vocalist Tony Rice.

== Solo albums ==
- Guitar (1973)
- California Autumn (1975)
- Tony Rice (1977)
- Church Street Blues (1983)
- Cold on the Shoulder (1984)
- Me & My Guitar (1986)
- Native American (1988)
- Tony Rice Plays and Sings Bluegrass (1993)
- Crossings (1994)
- Tony Rice Sings Gordon Lightfoot (1996)
- 58957:The Bluegrass Guitar Collection (2003)
- Night Flyer: The Singer Songwriter Collection (2008)

== As Tony Rice Unit ==
- Acoustics (1978)
- Manzanita (1979)
- Mar West (1980)
- Still Inside (1981)
- Backwaters (1982)
- Devlin (1987)
- Unit of Measure (2000)

== With David Grisman Quintet ==
- The David Grisman Quintet (1977)
- Hot Dawg (1979)
- Mondo Mando (1981)
- DGQ-20 (1996)

== With Bluegrass Album Band ==
- The Bluegrass Album (1981)
- Bluegrass Album, Vol. 2 (1982)
- Bluegrass Album, Vol. 3 - California Connection (1983)
- Bluegrass Album, Vol. 4 (1984)
- Bluegrass Album, Vol. 5 - Sweet Sunny South (1989)
- Bluegrass Album, Vol. 6 - Bluegrass Instrumentals (1996)

== With Norman Blake ==
- Blake & Rice (1987)
- Norman Blake and Tony Rice 2 (1990)

== As Rice Brothers ==
- The Rice Brothers (1989)
- The Rice Brothers 2 (1994)

== With Peter Rowan ==
- You Were There For Me (2004)
- Quartet (2007)

== As Rice, Rice, Hillman & Pedersen ==
- Out Of The Woodwork (1997)
- Rice, Rice, Hillman & Pedersen (1999)
- Runnin' Wild (2001)

== With J.D. Crowe & the New South ==
- Bluegrass Evolution (1973)
- J.D. Crowe & The New South (1975)

== Collaboration with other artists ==
- Skaggs & Rice (1980) with Ricky Skaggs
- Clawgrass Mark Johnson with the Rice Brothers and Friends (1994) with Mark Johnson
- Tone Poems (1994) with David Grisman
- River Suite for Two Guitars (1995) with John Carlini
- The Pizza Tapes (2000) with David Grisman & Jerry Garcia
- Hartford Rice and Clements (2011) with John Hartford & Vassar Clements

== As session musician ==
- The David Grisman Rounder Record (1976) for David Grisman
- Something Auld, Something Newgrass, Something Borrowed, Something Bluegrass (1976) for Bill Keith
- Catfish for Supper (1979) for Jon Sholle
- Eric Thompson's Bluegrass Guitar (1979) for Eric Thompson
- Roses in the Snow (1980) for Emmylou Harris
- Fiddlistics (1981) for Darol Anger
- Released (1984) for Todd Phillips (musician)
- Double Time (1984) for Béla Fleck
- Hometown Girl (1987) for Mary Chapin Carpenter
- Drive (1988) for Béla Fleck
- Pete Kennedy Highway 10 (1990): Tony Rice played guitar on the song "Highway 10"
- When It Rains (1991) for Lou Reid
- Pete Kennedy Shearwater: The Art Of The Unplugged Guitar (1993): Tony Rice is credited as a featured artist
- Cold Virginia Night (1994) for Ronnie Bowman
- Tales from the Acoustic Planet (1995) for Béla Fleck
- Leading Roll (1997) for Sammy Shelor
- The Bluegrass Sessions: Tales from the Acoustic Planet, Vol. 2 (1999) for Béla Fleck
- Fair Weather (2000) for Alison Brown
- In the Blue Room (2000) for Alan Bibey
- Don't Fret It (2002) for Rickie Simpkins
- Starting Over (2002) for Ronnie Bowman
- Carry Me Across the Mountain (2003) for Dan Tyminski
- The Bluegrass Fiddle Album (2003) for Aubrey Haynie
- Not Too Far From The Tree (2006) for Bryan Sutton
- Gaining Wisdom (2007) for Donna Hughes
- Secrets (2008) for Sierra Hull
- Almost Live (2009) for Bryan Sutton

== Chronological discography ==
=== Pre-1970 ===
- 1968 Session: Bobby Atkins, Frank Poindexter, and Tony Rice (1968 - Album apparently not released until 1981)) OLD HOMESTEAD 126

=== 1970 - 1980 ===
- Guitar (1973)
- Bluegrass Evolution (1973)
- J.D. Crowe & The New South (1975)
- California Autumn (1975)
- Tony Rice (1977)
- The David Grisman Quintet (1977)
- Hot Dawg (1979)
- Acoustics (1979)
- Manzanita (1979)
- Mar West (1980)
- Skaggs & Rice (1980)

=== 1981 - 1990 ===
- Still Inside (1981)
- Mondo Mando (1981)
- The Bluegrass Album (1981)
- Backwaters (1982)
- Bluegrass Album, Vol. 2 (1982)
- Bluegrass Album, Vol. 3 - California Connection (1983)
- Church Street Blues (1983)
- Bluegrass Album, Vol. 4 (1984)
- Cold on the Shoulder (1984)
- Me & My Guitar (1986)
- Blake & Rice (1987)
- Native American (1988)
- Bluegrass Album, Vol. 5 - Sweet Sunny South (1989)
- The Rice Brothers (1989)
- Norman Blake and Tony Rice 2 (1990)
- Devlin (1990)

=== 1991 - 2000 ===
- Tony Rice Plays and Sings Bluegrass (1993)
- The Rice Brothers 2 (1994)
- Crossings (1994)
- Tone Poems (1994)
- River Suite for Two Guitars (1995)
- Bluegrass Album, Vol. 6 - Bluegrass Instrumentals (1996)
- DGQ-20 (1996)
- Tony Rice Sings Gordon Lightfoot (1996)
- Out Of The Woodwork (1997)
- Rice, Rice, Hillman & Pedersen (1999)
- Unit of Measure (2000)
- The Pizza Tapes (2000)

=== 2001 - 2011 ===
- Runnin' Wild (2001)
- 58957:The Bluegrass Guitar Collection (2003)
- You Were There For Me (2004)
- Quartet (2007)
- Night Flyer: The Singer Songwriter Collection (2008)
- Tony Rice - The Bill Monroe Collection (Rounder Records compilation) (2011)
