= Bluegrass Album, Vol. 3 – California Connection =

Bluegrass Album, Vol. 3 - California Connection

Studio album by Bluegrass Album Band
- Released: 1983
- Genre: Bluegrass
- Label: Rounder
- Producer: Tony Rice

Bluegrass Album Band chronology
Bluegrass Album, Vol. 2 (1982)	Bluegrass Album, Vol. 3 - California Connection (1983)	Bluegrass Album, Vol. 4 (1984)

Tony Rice chronology
Bluegrass Album, Vol. 2 (1982)	Bluegrass Album, Vol. 3 - California Connection (1983)	Church Street Blues (1983)

Professional ratings
Review scores
Source	Rating
Allmusic	4.5/5 stars

Bluegrass Album, Vol. 3 — California Connection is a third album by bluegrass supergroup, Bluegrass Album Band, released in 1983. Dobroist Jerry Douglas is added to the line-up and the band includes some more country-rock to the mix, but the most part of the album consists of classics by Bill Monroe, Lester Flatt and Earl Scruggs.

== Track listing ==
1. "Devil In Disguise" (Chris Hillman, Gram Parsons) 3:20
2. "Letter From My Darling" (Bill Monroe) 3:00
3. "A Hundred Years From Now" (Lester Flatt) 2:15
4. "Unfaithful One" (Sid Campbell) 2:56
5. "Down The Road" (Lester Flatt, Earl Scruggs) 2:15
6. "I'd Rather Be Alone" (Lester Flatt) 3:07
7. "Big Spike Hammer" (Pete Goble, Bobby Osborne) 3:00
8. "Please Search Your Heart" (Pete Goble, Doyle Lawson) 2:29
9. "Hey Lonesome" (Sam Humphrey, Jimmy Martin) 2:05
10. "I'm Waiting To Hear You Call Me Darlin'" (Lester Flatt) 2:33
11. "Wall Around Your Heart" (Don Reno, Red Smiley, Buddy Smith) 2:42
12. "Come Back Darling" (Lester Flatt) 2:25

== Personnel ==
- Tony Rice - guitar, vocals
- J.D. Crowe - banjo, vocals
- Doyle Lawson - mandolin, vocals
- Bobby Hicks - fiddle
- Jerry Douglas - Dobro, vocals
- Todd Philips - bass
