= Bluegrass Album, Vol. 4 =

Studio album by Bluegrass Album Band
- Released: 1984
- Genre: Bluegrass
- Label: Rounder

Bluegrass Album Band chronology
| Bluegrass Album, Vol. 3 (1983) | Bluegrass Album, Vol. 4 (1984) | Bluegrass Album, Vol. 5 (1989) |

Tony Rice chronology
| Cold on the Shoulder (1984) | Bluegrass Album, Vol. 4 (1984) | Me & My Guitar (1986) |

Bluegrass Album, Vol. 4 is a fourth album by bluegrass supergroup, Bluegrass Album Band, released in 1984.

== Track listing ==
1. "Age" (Jim Croce) – 3:25
2. "Cheyenne" (Bobby Hicks, Bill Monroe) – 3:24
3. "Cora Is Gone" (Odell McLeod) – 3:05
4. "Old Home Town" (Lester Flatt) – 3:00
5. "Talk It Over With Him" (T.C. Neal) – 3:05
6. "Head Over Heels" (Lester Flatt) – 2:33
7. "Nobody Loves Me" (Zeke Clements) – 2:55
8. "When You Are Lonely" (Lester Flatt, Bill Monroe) – 2:35
9. "I Might Take You Back Again" (Josh Graves, Leroy Mack) – 1:50
10. "Lonesome Wind Blues" (Wayne Raney) – 3:07
11. "Somehow Tonight" (Earl Scruggs) – 3:02

== Personnel ==
- Tony Rice – guitar, vocals
- J.D. Crowe – banjo, vocals
- Doyle Lawson – mandolin, vocals
- Bobby Hicks – fiddle
- Jerry Douglas – Dobro, vocals
- Todd Philips – bass
