= The Bluegrass Album =

Studio album by Bluegrass Album Band
- Released: 1981
- Recorded: September 22–24, 1980; 1750 Arch Studios, Berkeley, California
- Genre: Bluegrass
- Label: Rounder
- Producer: Tony Rice

Bluegrass Album Band chronology
| The Bluegrass Album (1981) | Bluegrass Album, Vol. 2 (1982) |

Tony Rice chronology
| Mondo Mando (1981) | The Bluegrass Album (1981) | Backwaters (1982) |

The Bluegrass Album is the debut album by bluegrass supergroup, Bluegrass Album Band, released in 1981. It's a collection of bluegrass standards by Lester Flatt, Bill Monroe, Earl Scruggs, Ralph Stanley and others. Ultimately, six volumes were released, recorded between 1980 and 1996.

The Bluegrass Compact Disc [Rounder CD 11502, c. 1986] is a 20-song release drawn from volumes 1-4 of The Bluegrass Album.

== "Album" Track listing ==
1. Blue Ridge Cabin Home (Louise Certain, Gladys Stacey)
2. We Can't Be Darlings Anymore (Lester Flatt, John Ray "Curly" Seckler)
3. Molly And Tenbrooks (Bill Monroe)
4. I Believe In You Darling (Bill Monroe)
5. Model Church (Traditional)
6. On My Way Back To The Old Home (Bill Monroe)
7. Gonna Settle Down (Lester Flatt)
8. Toy Heart (Bill Monroe)
9. Pain In My Heart (Larry Richardson, Bobby Osborne)
10. Chalk Up Another One (H. Winston & Wilmer Neal)
11. River Of Death (Bill Monroe)

== Personnel ==
- Tony Rice - guitar, vocals
- J.D. Crowe - banjo, vocals
- Doyle Lawson - mandolin, vocals
- Bobby Hicks - fiddle, vocals
- Todd Philips - bass
