= Bluegrass Album, Vol. 2 =

The Bluegrass Album, Vol. 2

Studio album by Bluegrass Album Band
- Released: 1982
- Recorded: October 19–22, 1981
- Studio: 1750 Arch Studios, Berkeley, California
- Genre: Bluegrass
- Label: Rounder
- Producer: Tony Rice

Bluegrass Album Band chronology
The Bluegrass Album (1981)	The Bluegrass Album, Vol. 2 (1982)	Bluegrass Album, Vol. 3 (1983)

Tony Rice chronology
Backwaters (1982)	Bluegrass Album, Vol. 2 (1982)	Bluegrass Album, Vol. 3 (1983)

Professional ratings
Review scores
Source	Rating
Allmusic	4/5 stars

Bluegrass Album, Vol. 2 is a follow-up album by bluegrass supergroup, Bluegrass Album Band, released in 1982. As all the members already had their own duties in their groups, they originally intended to release only one album and disband. However, they continued with this volume plus four more and set the standards of the bluegrass music on a very high level.

== Track listing ==
1. "Your Love Is Like A Flower" (Lester Flatt, Everett Lilly, Earl Scruggs) 2:59
2. "We May Meet Again Someday" (Traditional) 2:51
3. "Take Me In The Lifeboat" (Frank Southern) 2:43
4. "Sitting Alone In The Moonlight" (Bill Monroe) 2:50
5. "Back to the Cross" (Jessie Mae Martin) 2:50
6. "Just When I Needed You" (Jack Anglin, Clyde Baum, Johnnie Wright) 2:34
7. "One Tear" (Judy Osborne) 2:20
8. "Ocean Of Diamonds" (Cliff Carnahan) 2:41
9. "Is It Too Late Now" (Lester Flatt) 2:43
10. "So Happy I'll Be" (Lester Flatt, Earl Scruggs) 2:38
11. "Don't This Road Look Rough And Rocky" (Lester Flatt, Earl Scruggs) 2:50
12. "I'll Never Shed Another Tear" (Lester Flatt) 3:03

== Personnel ==
- Tony Rice - guitar, vocals
- J.D. Crowe - banjo, lead guitar track 10, vocals
- Doyle Lawson - mandolin, vocals
- Bobby Hicks - fiddle
- Todd Philips - bass
