= Tony Rice Sings Gordon Lightfoot =

Compilation album by Tony Rice
- Released: May 28, 1996
- Genre: Americana, folk
- Length: 52:52
- Label: Rounder
- Producer: Tony Rice, Bill Wolf

Tony Rice chronology
DGQ-20 (1996)	Tony Rice Sings Gordon Lightfoot (1996)	Out Of The Woodwork (1997)

Professional ratings
Review scores
Source	Rating
Allmusic	4.5/5 stars

Tony Rice Sings Gordon Lightfoot is a compilation album by American guitarist Tony Rice, released in 1996. It contains tracks written by Gordon Lightfoot and previously recorded by Rice, plus a previously unreleased track, "Whispers of the North".

== Track listing ==
All songs by Gordon Lightfoot

1. "Go My Way" – 2:48
2. "Home from the Forest" – 4:17
3. "Fine as Fine Can Be" – 3:24
4. "Let It Ride" – 2:59
5. "I'm Not Sayin'" – 2:15
6. "Bitter Green" – 2:43
7. "You Are What I Am" – 2:22
8. "Shadows" – 3:43
9. "Walls" – 1:59
10. "Whispers of the North" – 4:17
11. "Ten Degrees (Getting Colder)" – 2:18
12. "The Wreck of the Edmund Fitzgerald" – 4:59
13. "Early Morning Rain" – 3:04
14. "Whisper My Name" – 3:19
15. "Sixteen Miles" – 2:45
16. "Cold on the Shoulder" – 2:34
17. "Song for a Winter's Night" – 3:09

== Personnel ==
- Tony Rice – guitar, vocals
- Sam Bush – mandolin, violin, background vocals
- Norman Blake – guitar, mandolin, vocals
- Cole Burgess – saxophone
- Kathy Chiavola – harmony vocals
- Vassar Clements – fiddle
- J. D. Crowe – banjo, vocals
- Jerry Douglas – dobro
- Bill Emerson – banjo, vocals
- Béla Fleck – banjo
- Jimmy Gaudreau – mandolin, vocals
- Bobby Hicks – violin
- Frank Poindexter – dobro
- Ron Rice – bass
- Wyatt Rice – guitar
- Mark Schatz – bass
- Rickie Simpkins – fiddle, viola
- Ricky Skaggs – vocals, fiddle, mandolin, trombone, viola
- Bobby Slone – bass
- Bill Wolf – piano
- Larry Rice – mandolin, background vocals
- Kate Wolf – background vocals
- Todd Phillips – bass
