= Bluegrass Album, Vol. 6 – Bluegrass Instrumentals =

Bluegrass Album, Vol. 6 - Bluegrass Instrumentals

Studio album by Bluegrass Album Band
- Released: 1996
- Genre: Bluegrass
- Label: Rounder
- Producer: Tony Rice

Bluegrass Album Band chronology
Bluegrass Album, Vol. 5 (1985)	Bluegrass Album, Vol. 6 - Bluegrass Instrumentals (1996)

Tony Rice chronology
River Suite for Two Guitars (1995)	Bluegrass Album, Vol. 6 (1996)	DGQ-20 (1995)

Professional ratings
Review scores
Source	Rating
Allmusic	4/5 stars

Bluegrass Album, Vol. 6 – Bluegrass Instrumentals is the sixth and final album by bluegrass supergroup, Bluegrass Album Band, released in 1996. Violinist Bobby Hicks and bassist Todd Philips reunite with the group, while Vassar Clements remains in the lineup for this ultimate recording to produce a fantastic double-fiddle sound together with Hicks.

Most of the songs are classics by Bill Monroe, two are delivered by the band's mandolinist, Doyle Lawson.

== Track listing ==
1. "Wheel Hoss" (Bill Monroe) – 2:38
2. "Misty Morning" (Doyle Lawson) – 3:43
3. "Ground Speed" (Earl Scruggs) – 2:12
4. "Stoney Lonesome" (Bill Monroe) – 2:32
5. "Lonesome Moonlight Waltz" (Bill Monroe) – 3:52
6. "Brown County Breakdown" (Bill Monroe) – 2:42
7. "Tall Timber" (Bill Monroe) – 2:15
8. "North Country Waltz" (Doyle Lawson) – 3:49
9. "Foggy Mountain Chimes" (Earl Scruggs) – 2:57
10. "Monroe's Hornpipe" (Bill Monroe) – 2:47
11. "Home Sweet Home" (Traditional) – 3:26
12. "Roanoke" (Joe Ahr) – 2:13

== Personnel ==
- Tony Rice - guitar
- J.D. Crowe - banjo
- Doyle Lawson - mandolin
- Vassar Clements - fiddle
- Bobby Hicks - fiddle
- Jerry Douglas - Dobro
- Todd Philips - bass
