= Tony Rice (album) =

Studio album by Tony Rice
- Released: 1977
- Genres: Americana, bluegrass, folk
- Length: 41:37
- Label: Rounder
- Producer: Tony Rice

Tony Rice chronology
California Autumn (1975)	Tony Rice (1977)	Acoustics (1979)

Professional ratings
Review scores
Source	Rating
Allmusic	4/5 stars

Tony Rice is an album by American guitarist Tony Rice, released in 1977.

== Track listing ==
1. "Banks of the Ohio" (Traditional) – 4:10
2. "Rattlesnake" (David Grisman) – 4:26
3. "Mr. Engineer" (Jimmy Martin, Paul Williams – 3:03
4. "Plastic Banana" (David Nichtern) – 2:52
5. "Don't Give Your Heart to a Rambler" (Jimmie Skinner) – 3:47
6. "Farewell Blues" (Paul Mares, Leon Roppolo, Elmer Schoebel) – 3:10
7. "Way Downtown" (Traditional) – 3:29
8. "Stoney Creek" (Jesse McReynolds) – 2:33
9. "Hills of Roane County" (Traditional) – 6:04
10. "Eighth of January" (Jimmie Driftwood) – 2:35
11. "Big Mon" (Bill Monroe) – 2:52
12. "Temperance Reel" (Traditional) – 2:36

== Personnel ==
- Tony Rice – guitar, vocals
- Darol Anger – violin
- Richard Greene – violin
- J. D. Crowe – banjo, vocals
- David Grisman – mandolin
- Larry Rice – mandolin
- Jerry Douglas – dobro
- Todd Phillips – bass

Production notes

- Tony Rice – producer, mixing
- Bob Shumaker – engineer, mixing
- Susan Marsh – design
