= Bluegrass Album, Vol. 5 – Sweet Sunny South =

Bluegrass Album, Vol. 5 - Sweet Sunny South

Studio album by Bluegrass Album Band
- Released: 1989
- Genre: Bluegrass
- Label: Rounder

Bluegrass Album Band chronology
Bluegrass Album, Vol. 4 (1984)	Bluegrass Album, Vol. 5 - Sweet Sunny South (1989)	Bluegrass Album, Vol. 6 (1996)

Tony Rice chronology
Native American (1992)	Bluegrass Album, Vol. 5 - Sweet Sunny South (1985)	Blake & Rice 2 (1990)

Professional ratings
Review scores
Source	Rating
Allmusic	3/5 stars

Bluegrass Album, Vol. 5 - —Sweet Sunny South is a fifth album by bluegrass supergroup, Bluegrass Album Band, released in 1989. Violinist Vassar Clements is on this album replacing Bobby Hicks, and bass duties are taken over by Mark Schatz (instead of Todd Philips, who otherwise plays on all Bluegrass Album Band albums.

== Track listing ==
1. "Rock Hearts" (Bill Otis) 2:37
2. "Big Black Train" (Stanley Johnson, George Sherry) 3:01
3. "Thinking About You" (Lester Flatt, Earl Scruggs) 3:18
4. "Out In The Cold World" (Traditional) 3:09
5. "On The Old Kentucky Shore" (Bill Monroe) 3:52
6. "Preaching, Praying, Singing" (E.C. McCarty) 2:33
7. "Someone Took My Place With You" (Lester Flatt, Tom Gurney, Earl Scruggs) 2:47
8. "Foggy Mountain Rock" (Louise Certain, Lester Flatt, Josh Graves) 3:58
9. "My Home's Across The Blue Ridge Mountains" (Traditional) 2:42
10. "Along About Daybreak" (Bill Monroe) 3:49
11. "Sweet Sunny South "(Traditional) 3:27

== Personnel ==
- Tony Rice - guitar, vocals
- J.D. Crowe - banjo, lead guitar track 6, vocals
- Doyle Lawson - mandolin, vocals
- Vassar Clements - fiddle
- Jerry Douglas - Dobro, vocals
- Mark Schatz - bass
