= 58957: The Bluegrass Guitar Collection =

Compilation album by Tony Rice
- Released: November 11, 2003
- Genre: Americana, bluegrass, folk
- Label: Rounder

Tony Rice chronology
Runnin' Wild (2001)	58957: The Bluegrass Guitar Collection (2003)	You Were There For Me (2004)

58957: The Bluegrass Guitar Collection is a compilation album by American guitarist Tony Rice, released in 2003. The title is derived from the serial number of a 1935 Martin D-28 guitar previously owned by the seminal bluegrass guitarist Clarence White and now owned by Rice.

== Track listing ==
1. "Tipper" (Tony Rice) – 3:38
2. "Monroe's Hornpipe" (Bill Monroe) – 3:00
3. "Jerusalem Ridge" (Monroe) – 6:36
4. "New Chance Blues" (Norman Blake) – 2:15
5. "Blackberry Blossom" (Traditional) – 2:36
6. "Medley: Fiddler's Dram/Whiskey Before Breakfast" (Traditional) – 4:41
7. "Whitewater" (Béla Fleck) – 3:10
8. "Lost Indian" (Ed Haley) – 3:08
9. "Stoney Point" (Traditional) – 2:45
10. "Misty Morning" (Doyle Lawson) – 3:43
11. "Gold Rush" (Monroe) – 3:02
12. "Foggy Mountain Rock" (Louise Certain, Buck Graves, Gladys Stacey) – 3:53
13. "Stoney Creek" (Jim McReynolds, Jesse McReynolds) – 2:33
14. "Home Sweet Home" (Traditional) – 3:27
15. "Bill Cheatham" (Traditional) – 2:09
16. "Stoney Lonesome" (Monroe) – 2:33
17. "Soldier's Joy" (Traditional) – 1:34
18. "Cheyenne" (Monroe) – 3:30
19. "Big Mon" (Monroe) – 2:52
20. "Birdland Breakdown" (John Reischman) – 3:29
21. "Port Tobacco" (Rice) – 4:44

== Personnel ==
- Tony Rice – guitar
- Doc Watson – guitar
- Sam Bush – mandolin, violin
- Norman Blake – guitar, mandolin
- Darol Anger – fiddle
- Fred Carpenter – fiddle
- Vassar Clements – fiddle
- J. D. Crowe – banjo
- Jerry Douglas – dobro
- Béla Fleck – banjo
- Stuart Duncan – fiddle
- Jimmy Gaudreau – mandolin
- David Grisman – mandolin
- Bobby Hicks – fiddle
- Richard Greene – fiddle
- Beryl Marriott – fiddle
- Todd Phillips – bass
- Wyatt Rice – guitar
- Larry Rice – mandolin
- Mark Schatz – bass
- Doyle Lawson – mandolin
- John Reischman – mandolin
- Rickie Simpkins – fiddle, bass
