= Guitar (Tony Rice album) =

Studio album by Tony Rice
- Released: 1973
- Recorded: Lemco Studio, Lexington, Kentucky
- Genres: Americana, bluegrass, folk
- Length: 33:23
- Label: King Records
- Producers: Tony Rice, Sab Watanabe

Tony Rice chronology
Guitar (1973)	J.D. Crowe & The New South (1974)

Professional ratings
Review scores
Source	Rating
Allmusic	3/5 stars

Guitar is the first album by American guitarist Tony Rice, released in 1973. At first, this album was issued by Red Clay Records, Japanese bluegrass album label, entitled "got me a martin guitar" in 1973.

== Track listing ==
1. "Freeborn Man" (Keith Allison, Mark Lindsay) 2:49
2. "Faded Love" (Bob Wills) 6:30
3. "Salt Creek" (Traditional) 3:45
4. "Doing My Time" (Jimmie Skinner) 4:06
5. "Windy And Warm" (John D. Loudermilk) 1:31
6. "John Hardy" (Traditional) 3:29
7. "Nine Pound Hammer" (Merle Travis) 2:17
8. "Lonesome Reuben" (Traditional) 8:56

== Personnel ==
- Tony Rice – guitar, vocals
- Larry Rice – mandolin, vocals
- Bobby Slone – bass, violin
- J.D. Crowe – banjo, vocals
