= Wild Mustang (disambiguation) =

A wild mustang is a free-roaming horse of the Western United States.

Wild Mustang may also refer to:

- Wild Mustang (film), a 1935 American Western film
- "Wild Mustang", a song on the Blood for Mercy album by Dutch electronic music ensemble Yellow Claw
- "Wild Mustang", a song on the 2004 You Were There for Me album by Peter Rowan and Tony Rice
