= The Rice Brothers =

Studio album by The Rice Brothers
- Released: 1989
- Genre: Americana, bluegrass, folk
- Length: 35:38
- Label: Rounder
- Producer: Tony Rice

Tony Rice chronology
Bluegrass Album, Vol. 5 – Sweet Sunny South (1989)	The Rice Brothers (1989)	"Norman Blake and Tony Rice 2"

Professional ratings
Review scores
Source	Rating
Allmusic	4.5/5 stars

The Rice Brothers is album recorded by guitarist Tony Rice and his brothers Ron, Larry, and Wyatt.

== Track listing ==
1. "Grapes on the Vine" (Steve Gillette and Charles John Quarto)
2. "This Old House" (Craig Bickhardt / Thom Schuyler)
3. "Original Untitled" (Wyatt Rice)
4. "Teardrops in My Eyes" (Red Allen (bluegrass) / Tommy Sutton)
5. "You're Drifting Away" (Bill Monroe)
6. "Don't Think Twice" (Bob Dylan)
7. "Let It Ride" (Gordon Lightfoot)
8. "Keep the Lamp on Sadie" (Larry Rice)
9. "Soldier's Joy" (Traditional)
10. "Whisper My Name" (Gordon Lightfoot)
11. "Life Is Like a Mountain Railway" (M. E. Abbey and Charles Davis Tillman)

== Personnel ==
- Tony Rice – guitar, vocals
- Wyatt Rice – guitar
- Larry Rice – mandolin, vocals
- Ron Rice – bass
- Bill Emerson – banjo, vocals
- Frank Poindexter – Dobro
- Jerry Douglas – Dobro
- Rickie Simpkins – violin, viola
- Jon Carroll – piano, vocals
