= Cold on the Shoulder =

Cold on the Shoulder may refer to:

- Cold on the Shoulder (Gordon Lightfoot album), 1975
- Cold on the Shoulder (Tony Rice album), 1983
