= The David Grisman Rounder Record =

Studio album by David Grisman
- Released: 1976
- Recorded: Starday Studios, Nashville, TN
- Genre: Americana, bluegrass, folk
- Length: 39:24
- Label: Rounder
- Producer: David Grisman

David Grisman chronology
Old & In the Way (1975)	The David Grisman Rounder Record (1976)	The David Grisman Quintet (album) (1977)

Professional ratings
Review scores
Source	Rating
Allmusic	4/5 stars

The David Grisman Rounder Record is an album by American musician David Grisman, released in 1976.

== Track listing ==
All songs by David Grisman unless otherwise noted.

1. "Hello" – :22
2. "Sawing On The Strings" (Lewis Compton) – 3:17
3. "Waiting On Vassar" – 5:00
4. "I Ain't Broke But I'm Badly Bent" (Public Domain) – 1:55
5. "Opus 38" – 3:15
6. "Hold To God's Unchanging Hand" (Public Domain) – 3:35
7. "Boston Boy" (Traditional) – 2:27
8. "Cheyenne" (Bill Monroe) – 4:45
9. "'Til The End Of The World Rolls 'Round" (Newton Thomas) – 2:55
10. "You'll Find Her Name Written There" (Harold Hensley) – 2:55
11. "On And On" (Bill Monroe) – 3:43
12. "Bob's Brewin'" – 4:57
13. "So Long" – :18

== Personnel ==
- David Grisman – mandolin, mandola, mandocello, vocals
- Tony Rice – guitar, vocals
- Vassar Clements – violin
- Jerry Douglas – dobro
- Bill Keith – banjo
- Ricky Skaggs – violin, vocals
- Tony Trischka – banjo
- Buck White – mandolin
- Todd Phillips – bass

Production notes:

- David Grisman – producer, engineer, mixing
- Dana Thomas – engineer
- Bob Ludwig – mastering
- Todd Phillips – cover photo
