= Bluegrass Album Band =

Bluegrass supergroup

- Genres: Bluegrass, folk
- Years active: 1980–1996
- Labels: Rounder
- Past members: Tony Rice – guitar, vocals J. D. Crowe – banjo, vocals Doyle Lawson – mandolin, vocals Bobby Hicks – fiddle Jerry Douglas – Dobro, vocals Vassar Clements – fiddle Todd Philips – bass Mark Schatz – bass

Bluegrass Album Band was a bluegrass supergroup, founded by Tony Rice and J. D. Crowe in 1980. Originally, there was no intention to build a permanent group and the main reason for the collaboration was to record a solo album for Tony Rice. They found that this cooperation could work and the result was an album called The Bluegrass Album, released in 1981, with 5 more volumes of music to follow. On September 5, 2012, they announced a reunion show that was held at Bluegrass First Class in Asheville, NC on February 16, 2013. This event reunited the Bluegrass Album Band with their former manager and promoter, Milton Harkey.

== Discography ==
- The Bluegrass Album (1981)
- Bluegrass Album, Vol. 2 (1982)
- Bluegrass Album, Vol. 3 - California Connection (1983)
- Bluegrass Album, Vol. 4 (1984)
- Bluegrass Album, Vol. 5 - Sweet Sunny South (1989)
- Bluegrass Album, Vol. 6 - Bluegrass Instrumentals (1996)
- Lonesome Moonlight: Bluegrass Songs Of Bill Monroe (2001; compilation)
- Down the Road: Songs of Flatt and Scruggs (2002; compilation)
