= Cold on the Shoulder (Tony Rice album) =

Studio album by Tony Rice
- Released: 1984
- Genre: Americana, bluegrass, folk
- Length: 35:41
- Label: Rounder
- Producer: Tony Rice

Tony Rice chronology
Church Street Blues (1983)	Cold on the Shoulder (1984)	Bluegrass Album, Vol. 4 (1984)

Professional ratings
Review scores
Source	Rating
Allmusic	4/5 stars

Cold on the Shoulder is an album by American guitarist Tony Rice, released in 1984. Originally intended as a follow-up of the 1979 album Manzanita, which doesn't include 5-string banjo, Rice decided to add it to this album for some of the tracks.

== Track listing ==
1. "Cold on the Shoulder" (Gordon Lightfoot) – 2:33
2. "Wayfaring Stranger" (Traditional) – 5:21
3. "John Hardy" (Traditional) – 3:27
4. "Fare Thee Well" (Bob Dylan) – 3:19
5. "Bitter Green" (Gordon Lightfoot) – 2:43
6. "Mule Skinner Blues" (Jimmie Rodgers) – 4:20
7. "Song for Life" (Rodney Crowell) – 2:58
8. "Why Don't You Tell Me So" (Lester Flatt) – 3:09
9. "If You Only Knew" (Larry Rice) – 2:14
10. "Likes of Me" (Jerry Reed) – 2:58
11. "I Think It's Going to Rain Today" (Randy Newman) – 2:39

== Personnel ==
- Tony Rice – guitar, vocals
- Sam Bush – mandolin
- Vassar Clements – fiddle
- J. D. Crowe – banjo, background vocals
- Jerry Douglas – dobro
- Béla Fleck – banjo
- Bobby Hicks – fiddle
- Larry Rice – mandolin, background vocals
- Kate Wolf – background vocals
- Todd Phillips – bass

Production notes:

- Tony Rice – producer
- Bill Wolf – engineer, mixing
- George Horn – mastering
- Elizabeth Weil – design
