= Acoustics (Tony Rice album) =

Studio album by Tony Rice
- Released: 1979
- Genre: Americana, bluegrass, folk
- Length: 33:20
- Label: Kaleidoscope Records
- Producer: Tony Rice

Tony Rice chronology
Tony Rice (1977)	Acoustics (1979)	Manzanita (1979)

Professional ratings
Review scores
Source	Rating
Allmusic	4/5 stars

Acoustics is an album by American guitarist Tony Rice, originally released on November 30, 1978. The album was recorded soon after Rice left the David Grisman Quintet to pursue his own music. On Acoustics, he merges genres such as jazz, bluegrass, and folk, to create a new genre which would later come to be known as "new acoustic music."

== Track listing ==
All songs by Tony Rice unless otherwise noted.

1. "Gasology" – 5:15
2. "Blues for Paradise" – 3:43
3. "Old Gray Coat" – 3:53
4. "Four on Six" (Wes Montgomery) – 3:41
5. "So Much" – 5:09
6. "Swing '51" – 3:10
7. "New Waltz" (Rice, Mike Marshall) – 5:10
8. "Fast Floyd" – 3:19

== Personnel ==
- Tony Rice – guitar, vocals
- Richard Greene – violin
- Sam Bush – mandolin
- David Grisman – mandolin
- Mike Marshall – mandolin
- Todd Phillips – bass

Production notes

- Tony Rice – producer
- Bill Wolf – engineer
