= Unit of measure (disambiguation) =

Unit of measure most commonly refers to units of measurement in weights and measures.

Unit of measure may also refer to:

- Unit of account, a monetary unit of measure in economics
- Unit of Measure (album), a 2000 album by Tony Rice
