= Quartet (Tony Rice and Peter Rowan album) =

Studio album by Tony Rice, Peter Rowan
- Released: 2007
- Genre: Americana, bluegrass, folk
- Label: Rounder Records
- Producer: Tony Rice, Peter Rowan

Tony Rice, Peter Rowan chronology
You Were There For Me (2004)	Quartet (2007)

Tony Rice chronology
You Were There For Me (2004)	Quartet (2007)	Night Flyer: The Singer Songwriter Collection (2008)

Peter Rowan chronology
Crucial Country (2006)	Quartet (2007)	Live at the Boarding House (2008)

Professional ratings
Review scores
Source	Rating
Allmusic	3.5/5 stars

Quartet is a second collaboration album of guitarists Peter Rowan and Tony Rice. On this record, the duo becomes a quartet with the addition of mandolinist Sharon Gilchrist and bassist Bryn Davies, both of whom sing as well. The band continues to deliver intimate, bluegrass-folk style music on a very high level.

== Track listing ==
1. "Dust Bowl Children" (Rowan) 4:45
2. "To Live Is to Fly" (Van Zandt) 3:47
3. "The Walls of Time" (Monroe, Rowan) 5:46
4. "Shady Grove" (trad.) 4:15
5. "Moonlight, Midnight" (Rowan) 7:40
6. "Trespasses" (Daugherty, Smith) 5:06
7. "The Sunny Side of the Mountain" (Gregory, McAuliffe) 3:42
8. "Cold Rain and Snow" (trad.) 6:14
9. "Guardian Angels" (Pons) 3:24
10. "Let the Harvest Go to Seed" (Rowan) 4:56
11. "Perfection" (Rowan) 2:41

== Personnel ==
- Tony Rice – guitar
- Peter Rowan – guitar, vocals
- Bryn Davies – bass, vocals
- Sharon Gilchrist – mandolin, vocals
