= Still Inside =

Studio album by Tony Rice
- Released: 1981
- Genre: Americana, bluegrass, folk
- Label: Rounder

Tony Rice chronology
Skaggs & Rice (1980)	Still Inside (1981)	Mondo Mando (1982)

Professional ratings
Review scores
Source	Rating
Allmusic	4.5/5 stars

Still Inside is an album by American guitarist Tony Rice, released in 1981. It is credited to The Tony Rice Unit.

Still Inside was issued in its entirely only on cassette and vinyl LP. A portion of the album was reissued on CD in 1987 along with part of the album Mar West as the compilation Devlin. This compilation omits the songs "Mister Diffenbach" and "Tzigani", which remain unissued on CD.

== Track listing ==
All songs by Tony Rice unless otherwise noted.

1. "Within Specs"
2. "Devlin"
3. "Mister Diffenbach"
4. "Night Coach"
5. "Vonetta" (Earl Klugh)
6. "Tzigani" (David Grisman)
7. "EBA" (Jon Sholle)
8. "Moses Sole"
9. "Birdland Breakdown" (John Reischman)
10. "Makers Mark"

== Personnel ==
- Tony Rice – guitar, vocals
- John Reischman – mandolin
- Fred Carpenter – violin
- Todd Phillips – bass
