= The David Grisman Quintet (album) =

Studio album by David Grisman Quintet
- Released: 1977
- Genre: Americana, progressive bluegrass, folk
- Label: Kaleidoscope, Acoustic Disc (reissue)
- Producer: David Grisman

David Grisman chronology
The David Grisman Rounder Record (1976)	The David Grisman Quintet (1977)	Hot Dawg (1978)

David Grisman Quintet chronology
The David Grisman Quintet (1977)	Hot Dawg (1978)

Professional ratings
Review scores
Source	Rating
Allmusic	4/5 stars
Christgau's Record Guide	B+

The David Grisman Quintet is the debut album by the David Grisman Quintet, recorded in 1976 and released in 1977.

== Cover ==
The instruments pictured on the cover are David's 1927 Gibson F-5 Mandolin, Darol's 1856 Guisepe Marconcine "Ferrara" Violin, Tony's 1935 Martin D-28 Guitar, Todd's 1924 Loar Gibson F-5 Mandolin, on loan, and Bill's 1875 Czech Flatback Bass.

== Track listing ==
All songs by David Grisman unless otherwise noted.

1. "E.M.D." – 2:37
2. "Swing 51" (Tony Rice) – 4:25
3. "Opus 57" – 2:56
4. "Blue Midnite" – 3:40
5. "Pneumonia" – 4:31
6. "Fish Scale" (Artie Traum) – 7:30
7. "Richochet" (Grisman, Richard Somers) – 2:05
8. "Dawg's Rag" – 9:04

added on CD

1. "Minor Swing" (Stephane Grappelli, Django Reinhardt) – 2:59
2. "16-16" – 5:35

== Personnel ==
- David Grisman – mandolin, vocals
- Tony Rice – guitar, vocals
- Darol Anger – fiddle, mandolin, violectra, vocals
- Bill Amatneek – bass
- Todd Phillips – mandolin

Production notes:

- David Grisman – producer
- Bill Wolf – engineer
- Bob Shumaker – mixing
- Ted Sharpe – design
- Robert Schleifer – photography
