= Mar West =

Studio album by Tony Rice Unit
- Released: 1980
- Genres: Bluegrass, jazz
- Length: 34:28
- Label: Rounder
- Producer: Tony Rice

Tony Rice chronology
Manzanita (1979)	Mar West (1980)	Skaggs & Rice (1980)

Mar West is an album by American guitarist Tony Rice, released in 1980. It is credited to the Tony Rice Unit.

Mar West was reissued in 1987 along with Still Inside as Devlin, minus the song "Mar East".

== Critical reception ==
Professional ratings
Review scores
Source	Rating
AllMusic	3/5 stars

The Florida Times-Union deemed the album "jazz-heavy spacegrass."

== Track listing ==
All songs by Tony Rice unless otherwise indicated.

1. "Mar West" – 5:31
2. "Nardis" (Miles Davis) – 3:47
3. "Waltz for Indira" – 3:21
4. "Neon Tetra" – 4:25
5. "Is That So" – 4:26
6. "Whoa Baby, Every Day I Wake Up with the Blues" – 3:56
7. "Mar East" – 4:38
8. "Untitled as of Yet" – 4:24

== Personnel ==
- Tony Rice – guitar, vocals
- Sam Bush – mandolin
- Richard Greene – violin
- Mike Marshall – mandolin
- Todd Phillips – bass

Production

- Tony Rice – producer
- Bill Wolf – engineer
- Greg Fulginiti – mastering
