= Sab Watanabe =

- Born: Saburo Watanabe Inoue; December 3, 1949; Takarazuka, Hyōgo, Japan
- Origin: Kobe, Japan
- Died: November 22, 2019 (aged 69)
- Genre: Bluegrass
- Occupations: Musician, producer, magazine publisher, promoter
- Instrument: Banjo
- Years active: 1967–2019
- Label: Red Clay Records
- Website: https://bluegrass45.com

Saburo "Sab" Watanabe Inoue (December 3, 1949 – November 22, 2019) was a Japanese bluegrass musician who was a founding member and banjo player for the group Bluegrass 45. He is known for helping popularize the genre in Japan.

== Career ==
Watanabe was born on December 3, 1949, in Takarazuka, Japan. In the early 1960s, Watanabe was exposed to bluegrass music for the first time. He took up banjo playing with American Earl Scruggs serving as his primary influence.

At the age of 17 in 1966, Watanabe started attending the Lost City Coffee House in Kobe, Japan with his older brother, Toshio Watanabe. The cafe was modeled after similar cafes in New York City and was described as a "bluegrass paradise" with live bands, records on request, and a guitar and banjo hanging on the wall. It was there, in the spring of 1967, that Watanabe and his brother participated in forming the group Bluegrass 45 along with four other college students. At the time, Watanabe was still in high school and would take a 45-minute train ride to Kobe on the weekends to play with the band.

Watanabe and Bluegrass 45 would hone their craft by playing bluegrass live at Lost City. Often, their audience would be filled with American soldiers on leave from the war in Vietnam. Watanabe recalled that "young soldiers cried when we play old Appalachian songs and tunes." The band would advertise to U.S. sailors handing out flyers at the piers where U.S. Navy ships docked reading "Live Country music – come on in and have a ball at Lost City."

In 1968, Earl Scruggs's band, Flatt and Scruggs, toured Japan and Watanabe described seeing the band saying "I thought I was a pretty good player at age 18. But ... when I saw Earl. His fingers changed my life." In the 1972 film Bluegrass Country Soul, Watanabe is documented playing Foggy Mountain Breakdown alongside Scruggs, his role model.

In 1970 Bluegrass 45 performed at the Japanese Expo '70 and proceeded to be the first Japanese Bluegrass band to tour in the United States in 1971. The band released three LPs under Rebel Records and toured the U.S. once more in 1972 before their disbandment that same year.

After Bluegrass 45, Watanabe began a career as a producer, magazine publisher, and promoter continuing to popularize bluegrass in Japan.

Alongside his brother, Toshio, Watanabe founded Red Clay Records in 1972 releasing bluegrass and old-time music. Through Red Clay, Watanabe produced and issued Tony Rice's first album Guitar in 1973. Watanabe and Toshio also founded B.O.M., a music distributing company selling bluegrass CDs in Japan.

In 1983 as part of B.O.M., Watanabe founded MoonShiner, the only Bluegrass magazine in Japanese. Watanabe served as the magazine's publisher and, beginning in 1991, it's editor as well. In 1998, Watanabe was named Print Media Person of the Year by the International Bluegrass Music Association.

Watanabe and Toshio founded the Takarazuka Bluegrass Festival in 1972 taking place at the Hazu Hachiman Shrine in the mountains of Takarazuka. Watanabe served as the festival's director for over forty years until his death. In 2022, the festival had its 50th iteration making it the third oldest bluegrass festival in the world (the other two being American festivals).

Watanabe died on November 22, 2019.
