= Larry Rice (musician) =

American musician (1949–2006)

- Rice in 1996

Background information
- Born: Larry Prentis Rice; April 24, 1949; Danville, Virginia, U.S.
- Died: May 13, 2006 (aged 57) Inverness, Florida, U.S.
- Genres: Bluegrass music
- Occupation: Musician
- Instruments: Mandolin; vocals
- Years active: 1969–2006
- Labels: King Bluegrass; Rebel
- Formerly of: The Rice Brothers

Larry Prentis Rice (April 24, 1949 – May 13, 2006) was an American mandolinist, singer, songwriter, and band leader in the bluegrass tradition. He is known for his solo albums and for his unique syncopated mandolin picking style.

== Biography ==
=== Early years ===
Rice was born in Danville, Virginia, but grew up in California, the oldest of the Rice brothers (Tony, Ronnie, and Wyatt). His father Herb started the Golden State Boys bluegrass band along with Hal and Leon Poindexter. While playing in the Golden State Boys, Rice befriended Chris Hillman.

Inspired by brothers Roland and Clarence White of the California-based Kentucky Colonels Rice and his brothers Tony (guitar) and Ronnie (bass) performed as The Haphazards and in other configurations, including Aunt Dinah's Quilting Party.

=== J. D. Crowe ===
In 1969, Rice moved to Kentucky and began his professional career in the Kentucky Mountain Boys, J. D. Crowe's first band. Rice also helped form Crowe's next band the New South. Other members included Doyle Lawson, Red Allen, and Bobby Slone.

=== Dickey Betts ===
Rice was a member of the Dickey Betts Band in 1975 when Betts toured to support his Highway Call album. Vassar Clements and Rice's uncle Frank Poindexter were also members of the band.

=== Solo recordings ===
In 1975, Rice recorded his first solo album Mr. Poverty on the King Bluegrass label. Starting in 1979, Rice retired from music for several years. Rice's next solo album Hurricanes and Daydreams (1985) was followed by Time Machine (1987).

Recorded in 1989 and released in 1990, Artesia found Rice helped out instrumentally by Rickie Simpkins (vocals, fiddle), Clay Jones, Tony Rice, Wyatt Rice (guitar), Steve Wilson (resonator guitar), Sammy Shelor (banjo), Jon Carroll (piano), Ronnie Simpkins (bass), and Robbie Magruder (drums). Mary Chapin Carpenter was guest vocalist.

Notions and Novelties was released in 1996, featuring Gabe Valla and Tony Rice (guitar), James Tucker and Frank Poindexter (resonator guitar), Mark Johnson and Wynn Osborne (banjo), Rickie Simpkins (fiddle), and Tracy Collins (piano, drums).

=== Rice, Rice, Hillman and Pedersen ===
In 1989, Rice recorded the album The Rice Brothers for Rounder Records with his three brothers Tony, Ron, and Wyatt. They followed up with The Rice Brothers 2 in 1994.

In the 1990s, Rice recorded and performed with his brother Tony, Chris Hillman, and Herb Pedersen as Rice, Rice, Hillman and Pedersen.

=== Later career ===
Rice released his final solo album Clouds Over Carolina in 2005. Joining him were Ronnie Simpkins (bass), Jeff Parker (background vocals); Tony Rice and Wyatt Rice (guitar), Frank Poindexter (resonator guitar); Sammy Shelor (banjo), and Rickie Simpkins (fiddle).

Rice died from mesothelioma cancer in Inverness, Florida, on May 13, 2006, at the age of 57.

In 2014, Rebel Records released the 16-track retrospective album If You Only Knew: The Best of Larry Rice.

== Discography ==
=== Solo albums ===
- 1975: Mr. Poverty (King Bluegrass)
- 1986: Hurricanes and Daydreams (Rebel)
- 1987: Time Machine (Rebel)
- 1990: Artesia (Rebel)
- 1996: Notions and Novelties (Rebel)
- 2005: Clouds over Carolina (Rebel)
- 2014: If You Only Knew: The Best of Larry Rice (Rebel) compilation

=== With J. D. Crowe ===
- 1971: The Model Church (Lemco)
- 1973: Ramblin' Boy (King Bluegrass) with the Kentucky Mountain Boys
- 1973: Bluegrass Evolution (Starday) with the New South
- 1977: J. D. Crowe & The New South (Starday)
- 1978: Blackjack (Rebel) (a reissue of 1973's "Ramblin' Boy" with same songs but different song order)

=== With Tony Rice ===
- 1973: Guitar (Rebel)
- 1975: California Autumn (Rebel)
- 1977: Tony Rice (Rounder)
- 1984: Cold on the Shoulder (Rounder)
- 1993: Tony Rice Plays and Sings Bluegrass (Rounder)
- 1996: Tony Rice Sings Gordon Lightfoot (Rounder)
- 2003: 58957:The Bluegrass Guitar Collection (Rounder)

=== Larry Rice and Niles Hokkanen ===
- 1982: Larry Rice & Niles Hokkanen (self-released) cassette-only release with tablature book

=== The Rice Brothers ===
- 1989: The Rice Brothers (Rounder)
- 1994: The Rice Brothers 2 (Rounder)

=== With Rice, Rice, Hillman, and Pedersen ===
- 1997: Out of the Woodwork (Rounder)
- 1999: Rice, Rice, Hillman & Pedersen (Rounder)
- 2001: Runnin' Wild (Rounder)

=== As composer ===
- 1999: J. D. Crowe - Come on Down to My World (Rounder) - track 2, "Come on Down to My World"
- 2005: Ronnie Bowman - It's Gettin' Better All the Time (Koch Records) - track 5, "Four Wheel Drive"

=== Also appears on ===
- 1995: Mark Johnson and Clawgrass - Clawgrass (Bangtown)
- 1997: Mark Johnson and Clawgrass - Bridging the Gap (Pinecastle)
- 2001: Candlewyck - Candlewyck (Votive Records)
- 2005: Frank Poindexter - It's The Music (Dex) with the Rice Brothers
