= Runnin' Wild (Tony Rice album) =

Running Wild

Studio album by Rice, Rice, Hillman & Pedersen
- Released: 2001
- Genre: Americana, folk, progressive bluegrass
- Label: Rounder
- Producer: Rice, Rice, Hillman & Pedersen

Rice, Rice, Hillman & Pedersen chronology
| Rice, Rice, Hillman & Pedersen (1999) | Running Wild (2001) |

Tony Rice chronology
| Pizza Tapes (2000) | Runnin' Wild (1999) | 58957:The Bluegrass Guitar Collection (2003) |

Professional ratings
Review scores
| Source | Rating |
|---|---|
| Allmusic | 2.5/5 stars |

Running Wild is a collaboration album by American guitarist Tony Rice, mandolinist Larry Rice, guitar and banjo player Herb Pedersen and guitar/bass player Chris Hillman. This "Anti-supergroup", as they call themselves, has already issued three volumes of music together. They blend folk music, progressive bluegrass and contemporary country and this album contains both original songs as well as country classics.

== Track listing ==
1. "San Antone" (Hillman) 2:35
2. "You're Running Wild" (Edenton, Winters) 2:03
3. "Things We Said Today" (Lennon, McCartney) 2:52
4. "4+20" (Stills) 3:12
5. "Two of a Kind" (Ims) 3:06
6. "Just Passin' Through" (Hillman) 2:41
7. "The Mystery That Won't Go Away" (Rice) 3:12
8. "Take Me Back Again" (Owens) 2:43
9. "Maybe She'll Get Lucky" (Hillman) 2:42
10. "Hard Hearted" (Mc Reynolds) 2:56
11. "It's A Long Way to the Top of the World" (Wayne) 3:05
12. "About Love" (Rice) 4:15

== Personnel ==
- Tony Rice – guitar
- Larry Rice – mandolin, vocals
- Chris Hillman – mandolin, bass, vocals
- Herb Pedersen – banjo, guitar, vocals

with

- Fred Travers – Dobro
- Bob Warford – electric guitar
- Jay Dee Maness – steel guitar
- Ronnie Simpkins – bass
- Rickie Simpkins – violin
