= Burden Bearer =

Studio album by Doyle Lawson
- Released: July 8, 2016
- Recorded: January 2016
- Genres: Bluegrass music, gospel music
- Length: 63:09
- Label: Mountain Home Records
- Producers: Doyle Lawson & Quicksilver

Doyle Lawson chronology
In Session (2015)	Burden Bearer (2016)

Burden Bearer is a bluegrass gospel album by Doyle Lawson and Quicksilver, released on July 8, 2016. The album was nominated for a Grammy Award for Best Bluegrass Album in December 2016.

== Critical reception ==
John Lawless of Bluegrass Today says the album may be "the definitive album in [the bluegrass gospel] genre" and believes the performances sets it apart more than the songs themselves.

== Track listing ==
No.	Title	Writer(s)	Length
1.	"Burden Bearer"	Tammy Jones Robinette	2:30
2.	"Best Friends"	Robinette	3:59
3.	"Brother Have You Heard"	Doyle Lawson & Quicksilver	2:13
4.	"He'll Care for You"		3:18
5.	"No Storms That We Must Fear"	Steve Watts	3:39
6.	"You Were Right"	Randy Swift	3:46
7.	"Rejoicing All the Way"		1:59
8.	"The Touch of His Gentle Hand"	Albert E. Brumley Sr.	4:22
9.	"Another Day"	Watts	2:28
10.	"He's Everywhere"	Arthur Smith	3:32
11.	"Get Right with God"	Lawson, Quicksilver	2:41
12.	"Passed All Sorrow"	Watts	2:38
13.	"God Gave Noah the Rainbow Sign"	A. P. Carter	3:20
14.	"By the Marks in His Hands"	Watts	2:56
15.	"The Cross in the Garden"	Eubert M. Baygent, Walter H. Howell	3:52
16.	"Sailing on the Waves of Glory"	Luther G. Presley	2:12
17.	"Wonderful Day"	James Dean Bilbrey, Ronald Bilbrey	3:17
18.	"Wrastlin' Jacob"		2:03
19.	"Songs I Heard My Mama Sing"		3:36
20.	"How Great Thou Art"	Stuart K. Hine	4:48

== Personnel ==
- Doyle Lawson – baritone, guitar, mandolin, tenor, vocals (baritone, tenor)
- Stephen Burwell – fiddle, fiddle harmonics
- Joe Dean – banjo, guitar
- Eli Johnston – bass, guitar, vocals (baritone)
- Dustin Pyrtle – guitar, vocals (tenor)
- Josh Swift – guitar (resonator, rhythm), percussion, piano, vocals (bass)
