= Out of the Woodwork =

Studio album by Rice, Rice, Hillman & Pedersen
- Released: 1997
- Genre: Americana, folk, progressive bluegrass
- Label: Rounder
- Producer: Tony Rice

Rice, Rice, Hillman & Pedersen album chronology
Out of the Woodwork (1997)	Rice, Rice, Hillman & Pedersen (1999)

Tony Rice chronology
Tony Rice Sings Gordon Lightfoot (1996)	Out Of The Woodwork (1997)	Rice, Rice, Hillman & Pedersen (1999)

Professional ratings
Review scores
Source	Rating
AllMusic	3/5 stars
Cross Rhythms	9/10
The Encyclopedia of Popular Music	4/5 stars
MusicHound Folk: The Essential Album Guide	4/5 stars

Out of the Woodwork is a collaboration album by American guitarist Tony Rice, his brother, mandolinist Larry Rice, guitar and banjo player Herb Pedersen and guitar/bass player Chris Hillman.

== Critical reception ==
Entertainment Weekly wrote that "instead of showing off their hot licks [Rice, Rice, Hillman & Pedersen] opt for tight vocal harmonies and canny song choices like a country waltz version of Aretha’s 'Do Right Woman' and a breathtaking pass at Richard Thompson’s 'Dimming of the Day.'" MusicHound Folk: The Essential Album Guide called Out of the Woodwork "a marvelously crafted album."

== Track listing ==
1. Hard Times 4:14
2. Lord Won't You Help Me 1:55
3. Somewhere on the Road Tonight 3:47
4. No One Else 3:12
5. Streetcorner Stranger 3:47
6. So Begins the Task 2:37
7. Dimming of the Day 3:10
8. Just Me and You 3:32
9. Do Right Woman 3:43
10. Change Coming Down 2:29
11. Story of Love 2:26
12. Only Passing Through 3:54

== Personnel ==
- Tony Rice – guitar
- Larry Rice – mandolin, vocals
- Chris Hillman – bass, guitar, vocals
- Herb Pedersen – banjo, guitar, vocals

with

- Jerry Douglas – Dobro
- Mike Auldridge – Dobro
- Ronnie Simpkins – bass
- Rickie Simpkins – violin
