= River Suite for Two Guitars =

Studio album by Tony Rice, John Carlini
- Released: 1995
- Genre: [New Acoustic music, Jazz ]]
- Label: Sugar Hill
- Producer: Tony Rice, John Carlini

Tony Rice chronology
Tone Poems (1994)	River Suite for Two Guitars (1995)	Bluegrass Album, Vol. 6 (1996)

Professional ratings
Review scores
Source	Rating
Allmusic	3/5 stars

River Suite for Two Guitars is a collaboration album of guitarists Tony Rice and John Carlini, who both previously performed with the David Grisman Quintet.

== Track listing ==
1. "Banister River" (John Carlini, Tony Rice) 2:25
2. "Send in the Clowns" (Stephen Sondheim) 3:06
3. "Innocenti" (Ralph Towner) 3:56
4. "So It Goes" (Carlini) 3:36
5. "Nardis" (Miles Davis) 3:36
6. "Unknown Emotion/Hidden Place" (Matt Maher) 3:34
7. "Fish Scale" (Artie Traum) 2:36
8. "Night Coach" (Rice) 2:32
9. "Big Mang" (Carlini) 1:52
10. "Summertime" (George Gershwin, DuBose Heyward) 4:10
11. "It Takes a Thief" (Dave Grusin) 3.05
12. "Devlin" (Rice) 4:46

== Personnel ==
- Tony Rice - guitar
- John Carlini - guitar
