= Phil Leadbetter =

American resonator guitar player (1962–2021)

- Born: March 31, 1962; Knoxville, Tennessee, U.S.
- Died: October 14, 2021 (aged 59) Knoxville, Tennessee, U.S.
- Genres: Bluegrass
- Occupation: Musician
- Instrument: Resonator guitar
- Website: unclephilonline.com

Phil Leadbetter (March 31, 1962 – October 14, 2021) was an American resonator guitar player.

== Life ==
Born in Knoxville, Tennessee, Leadbetter began playing the resonator guitar at age 12. He was a 1980 graduate of Gibbs High School in Corryton, Tennessee.

In April 2011, Leadbetter was diagnosed with Hodgkins Lymphoma, a form of cancer that attacks the lymph nodes. After return of cancer two more times, Leadbetter was diagnosed for a fifth time in June 2019, and in September 2019 became a five-time survivor on the new drug Opdivo. This is the same drug that Leadbetter had been given during clinical trials.

Leadbetter died in October 2021, after having contracted COVID-19 the previous month.

=== Career ===
A summary of Leadbetter's professional career:

- 1988: The Grandpa Jones Show
- 1989: The Vern Gosdin Band
- 1990–2001: J. D. Crowe and the New South
- 2002–2006: Wildfire (founding member)
- 2007–2010: Grasstowne (founding member)
- 2010–2011: The Whites
- 2013–2016: The Dale Ann Bradley Band
- 2016–2017: Flashback (founding member)
- 2017–2021: Phil Leadbetter And The All-Stars Of Bluegrass

Leadbetter returned to performing in February 2013 as a member of Dale Ann Bradley's band after nearly 2 years away from the music business. He released a solo CD The Next Move in the fall of 2015.

In March 2016, Leadbetter left the Dale Ann Bradley band to help form the bluegrass group Flashback. The members of Flashback were in the original Grammy nominated J. D Crowe And the New South band from 1994. Flashback and Crowe toured during 2015 on a 20-year reunion tour.

At the end of 2015, Crowe retired from music, but the band continued to perform under the name "Flashback". Leadbetter departed the band in November 2017 to start a new musical direction with his new band Phil Leadbetter And The All-Stars Of Bluegrass.

=== Awards and recognition ===
In 1994, Leadbetter received a Grammy Nomination for "Best Bluegrass Album" at the 37th Annual Grammy Awards for his work with J. D. Crowe and the New South on the album Flashback.

In 2005, 2014, and 2019, he was voted International Bluegrass Music Association "Dobro Player Of The Year". He also won the 2005 "Instrumental Album Of The Year" for his CD Slide Effects.

His song "California Cottonfields" held the #1 spot on the National Bluegrass Chart for two consecutive months in 2005.

In 2015, Leadbetter was awarded "Dobro Player Of The Year" at The International Bluegrass Music Awards. This was his second time winning this award. One of only three dobro players to ever win that award.

Leadbetter was inducted into The Atlanta Country Music Hall Of Fame on November 28, 2015.

The 'Phil Leadbetter Signature Dobro' manufactured by the Gibson Guitar Corporation featured a square neck for steel guitar playing and a single inverted-cone resonator. The guitar also featured solid wood construction. It was the only guitar being made at that time which bore the name "Dobro". After the shut down of the Gibson Acoustic division, Leadbetter moved over to The Recording King Company, and a new line of resonator guitars were released bearing his name in late 2018.

== Discography ==
=== Solo albums ===
- 1999: Philibuster (Rounder)
- 2005: Slide Effects (Pinecastle)
- 2014: The Next Move (Pinecastle)

=== As a member of J. D. Crowe and The New South ===
- 1994: Flashback (Rounder)
- 1999: Come On Down to My World (Rounder)

=== As a member of Wildfire ===
- 2001: Uncontained (Pinecastle)
- 2003: Where Roads Divide (Pinecastle)
- 2005: Rattle The Chains (Pinecastle)

=== As a member of Grasstowne ===
- 2007: The Road Headin' Home (Thirty Tigers)
- 2009: The Other Side of Town (Pinecastle)

=== As a member of Flashback ===
- 2017: Foxhounds & Fiddles (Pinecastle)

=== As a member of Phil Leadbetter And The All-Stars Of Bluegrass ===
- 2020 Swing For The Fences (Pinecastle)

=== As primary artist/contributor ===
- 1999: various artists - Christmas in the Smokies (Evening Star) - track 2, "Jingle Bells"
- 2010: various artists - Southern Filibuster: A Tribute to Tut Taylor (Entertainment One) - track 11, "Acoustic Toothpick" (with Jerry Douglas)

=== Also appears on ===
- 1994: Doyle Lawson & Quicksilver - Flashback (Sugar Hill)
- 1995: Doyle Lawson & Quicksilver - Never Walk Away (Sugar Hill)
- 2005: Michelle Nixon and Drive - What More Should I Say? (Pinecastle)
- 2005: Darrell Webb - Behind The Scenes (Lonesome Day)
- 2006: Emmaus Road - Transformed (self-released)
- 2007: The Special Consensus - The Trail of Aching Hearts (Pinecastle)
- 2014: Steve Gulley - Family, Friends & Fellowship (Rural Rhythm)
- 2015: Dale Ann Bradley - Pocket Full of Keys (Pinecastle)
- 2015: Steve Gulley and New Pinnacle - Steve Gulley & New Pinnacle (Rural Rhythm)
- 2016: Stuart Wyrick - East Tennessee Sunrise (Rural Rhythm)
