= Me & My Guitar (Tony Rice album) =

Studio album by Tony Rice
- Released: 1986
- Genre: Americana, bluegrass, folk
- Length: 42:37
- Label: Rounder
- Producer: Tony Rice, Bill Wolf

Tony Rice chronology
Cold on the Shoulder (1983)	Me & My Guitar (1986)	Blake & Rice (1987)

Professional ratings
Review scores
Source	Rating
Allmusic	2/5 stars

Me & My Guitar is an album by American guitarist Tony Rice, released in 1986.

== Track listing ==
1. "Me and My Guitar" (James Taylor) – 3:55
2. "Four Strong Winds" (Ian Tyson) – 4:00
3. "Walls" (Gordon Lightfoot) – 1:58
4. "Greenlight on the Southern" (Norman Blake) – 3:24
5. "Port Tobacco" (Tony Rice) – 4:45
6. "Early Morning Rain" (Lightfoot) – 3:02
7. "Sixteen Miles" (Lightfoot) – 2:39
8. "Hard Love" (Bob Franke) – 4:19
9. "Tipper" (Rice) – 3:36
10. "Song for a Winter's Night" (Lightfoot) – 3:08
11. "Sweetheart Like You" (Bob Dylan) – 4:28
12. "Fine as Fine Can Be" (Lightfoot) – 3:23

== Personnel ==
- Tony Rice – guitar, vocals
- Vassar Clements – violin, background vocals
- Jerry Douglas – dobro
- Wyatt Rice – guitar
- Bill Wolf – piano
- Todd Phillips – bass
- Larry Atamanuik – drums, percussion
- Cole Burgess – saxophone
- Sam Bush – mandolin
- Bob "Barbecue Bob" Hicks – fiddle, harmony vocals
- Kathy Chiavola – harmony vocals
- Jimmy Gaudreau – mandolin, harmony vocals
- Mark Schatz – bass, background vocals

Production notes:

- Tony Rice – producer
- Bill Wolf – producer, engineer, mixing, mastering
- George Horn – mastering
