= Norman Blake and Tony Rice 2 =

Studio album by Norman Blake, Tony Rice
- Released: 1988
- Genre: Americana, bluegrass, folk
- Length: 42:33
- Label: Rounder
- Producer: Norman Blake, Tony Rice

Norman Blake chronology
Blind Dog (1988)	Norman Blake and Tony Rice 2 (1988)	The Fields of November/Old and New (1992)

Tony Rice chronology
Bluegrass Album, Vol. 5 (1988)	Norman Blake and Tony Rice 2 (1990)	Devlin (Tony Rice album) (1992)

Professional ratings
Review scores
Source	Rating
Allmusic	4/5 stars

Norman Blake and Tony Rice 2 is an album by American guitarists Norman Blake and Tony Rice, released in 1990. It is their second album together. They previously released Blake & Rice in 1987. Doc Watson appears as a guest.

== Track listing ==
1. "It's Raining Here This Morning" (Grandpa Jones) – 3:37
2. "Lost Indian" (Traditional) – 3:06
3. "Georgie" (Traditional) – 2:49
4. "Father's Hall" (Nancy Blake) – 2:17
5. "The Two Soldiers" (Traditional) – 4:35
6. "Blackberry Blossom" (Traditional) – 3:14
7. "Eight More Miles to Louisville" (Grandpa Jones) – 2:46
8. "Lincoln's Funeral Train (The Sad Journey to Springfield)" (Norman Blake) – 4:14
9. "Molly Bloom" (Alan Mundel) – 2:39
10. "D-18 Song (Thank You, Mr. Martin)" (Jerry Faires) – 3:58
11. "Back in Yonder's World" (Norman Blake) – 3:54
12. "Bright Days" (Norman Blake) – 2:14
13. "Salt Creek" (Traditional) – 3:10

== Personnel ==
- Norman Blake – guitar, mandolin, vocals
- Tony Rice – guitar, vocals
- Nancy Blake – mandolin, cello, vocals
- Mark Schatz – bass
- Doc Watson – guitar

Production notes

- Bill Wolf – engineer, editing, executive producer, photography
- David Glasser – editing
- George Horn – mastering
- Nancy Jean Anderson – design
