= You Were There for Me =

Studio album by Peter Rowan and Tony Rice
- Released: September 28, 2004
- Genre: Americana, bluegrass, folk
- Length: 43:36
- Label: Rounder
- Producer: Peter Rowan and Tony Rice

Peter Rowan and Tony Rice chronology
You Were There for Me (2004)	Quartet (2007)

Peter Rowan chronology
Crazy People (2003)	You Were There for Me (2004)	Crucial Country (2006)

Tony Rice chronology
58957:The Bluegrass Guitar Collection (2003)	You Were There for Me (2004)	Night Flyer: The Singer Songwriter Collection (2008)

Professional ratings
Review scores
Source	Rating
Allmusic	4.5/5 stars

You Were There for Me is a collaboration studio album of Peter Rowan and Tony Rice. The record marks their first full-fledged cooperation, though they had previously appeared on several albums together.

== Track listing ==
No.	Title	Lyrics	Length
1.	"You Were There for Me"	Peter Rowan	3:08
2.	"Tin Roof Shack"	Rowan	3:25
3.	"Shirt Off My Back"	Rowan	3:48
4.	"Cowboys and Indians"	Rowan, Lorin Rowan	2:04
5.	"Miss Liberty"	Rowan	5:36
6.	"Ahmed the Beggar Boy"	Rowan	4:49
7.	"Angel Island"	Rowan	6:50
8.	"Ain't That Just Like You"	Rowan	5:04
9.	"Come Back to Old Santa Fé"	Rowan	4:09
10.	"Wild Mustang"	Rowan	4:43
Total length:			43:36

== Personnel ==
- Tony Rice — guitar
- Peter Rowan — vocals, guitar, mandola
- Bryn Davies — double bass, background vocals
- Larry Atamanuik — drums
- Billy Bright — mandola, mandolin
- Tony Garnier — double bass
- Robert Emery — background vocals
