= Devlin (album) =

Compilation album by Tony Rice Unit
- Released: 1987
- Recorded: 1987
- Genre: Americana, bluegrass, folk
- Length: 63:52
- Label: Rounder
- Producer: Tony Rice

Tony Rice chronology
Blake & Rice (1987)	Devlin (1987)	Native American (1992)

Professional ratings
Review scores
Source	Rating
Allmusic	4.5/5 stars

Devlin is a compilation album by American guitarist Tony Rice, originally released in 1987. It contains tracks included on Rice's previous albums Mar West and Still Inside. Both albums were credited to The Tony Rice Unit. The reissue does not include the songs "Mar East", "Mister Diffenbach" and "Tzigani".

== Track listing ==
All songs by Tony Rice unless otherwise noted.

1. "Devlin" – 5:20
2. "Is That So" – 4:26
3. "Waltz for Indira" – 3:21
4. "Within Specs" – 3:47
5. "Untitled as of Yet" – 4:24
6. "Neon Tetra" – 4:25
7. "Night Coach" – 4:14
8. "Nardis" (Miles Davis) – 3:47
9. "EBA" (Jon Sholle) – 3:23
10. "Mar West" – 5:31
11. "Moses Sole" – 4:58
12. "Birdland Breakdown" (John Reischman) – 3:29
13. "Whoa Baby, Every Day I Wake up With the Blues" – 3:56
14. "Vonetta" (Earl Klugh) – 3:28
15. "Makers Mark" – 5:23

== Personnel ==
- Tony Rice – guitar
- John Reischman – mandolin
- Fred Carpenter – violin
- Todd Phillips – bass
- Sam Bush – mandolin
- Richard Greene – violin
- Mike Marshall – mandolin
