= Blake & Rice =

Studio album by Norman Blake, Tony Rice
- Released: 1987
- Genre: Americana, bluegrass, folk
- Length: 43:52
- Label: Rounder
- Producer: Norman Blake, Tony Rice

Norman Blake chronology
Slow Train through Georgia (1987)	Blake & Rice (1987)	Blind Dog (1988)

Tony Rice chronology
Me & My Guitar (1986)	Blake & Rice (1987)	Devlin (1990)

Blake & Rice is an album by American guitarists Norman Blake and Tony Rice, released in 1987. They later teamed up again for Norman Blake and Tony Rice 2.

== Reception ==
Professional ratings
Review scores
Source	Rating
Allmusic	4/5 stars

In his AllMusic review, critic Jim Smith wrote of the album "There is some exceptional flatpicking here, but even the more manic passages are tempered by a softness that is striking, and perhaps even a little disappointing, in its modesty. Once the listener gets past the desire to hear hardcore chops, though, the album reveals its full beauty..."

== Track listing ==
1. "New Chance Blues" (Norman Blake) – 2:15
2. "Greenlight on the Southern" (Blake) – 3:43
3. "I'm Not Sayin'" (Gordon Lightfoot) – 2:16
4. "Texas Gales" (Traditional) – 3:38
5. "Ridge Road Gravel" (Blake) – 2:25
6. "Monroe's Hornpipe" (Bill Monroe) – 2:14
7. "Last Train From Poor Valley" (Blake) – 3:32
8. "New River Train" (Monroe) – 3:25
9. "Stoney Point" (Traditional) – 2:11
10. "Gonna Lay Down My Old Guitar" (Alton Delmore, Rabon Delmore) – 3:32
11. "Little Beggarman/Gilderoy" (Traditional) – 3:05
12. "The Shipyard Apprentice" (Norman Buchan, R. Campbell, Archie Fisher) – 4:13
13. "Medley: Fiddler's Dream/Whiskey Before Breakfast" (Traditional) – 4:40
14. "I'm Coming Back (But I Don't Know When)" (Traditional) – 2:43

== Personnel ==
- Norman Blake – guitar, mandolin, vocals
- Tony Rice – guitar, vocals

Production notes

- George Horn – mastering
- Bill Wolf – engineer, photography
