= Blind Dog =

Studio album by Norman Blake
- Released: 1988
- Genre: Americana, bluegrass, folk
- Length: 40:17
- Label: Rounder
- Producer: Norman Blake

Norman Blake chronology
Blake & Rice (1987)	Blind Dog (1988)	Norman Blake and Tony Rice 2 (1990)

Blind Dog is an album of American guitarist Norman Blake, released in 1988.

== Reception ==
Professional ratings
Review scores
Source	Rating
Allmusic	4/5 stars

In his Allmusic review, critic Jason Ankeny called the album "a fine summation of bluegrass guitarist's Norman Blake's career and aesthetics, a largely instrumental collection of favorites from his own catalog as well as from his influences."

== Track listing ==
1. "Little Stream of Whiskey" (Traditional) – 3:29
2. "Grand Coulee Dam" (Woody Guthrie) – 3:43
3. "Prettiest Little Girl in the Country" (Traditional) – 2:19
4. "Billy Gray" (Blake) – 4:08
5. "Otto Wood the Bandit" (Traditional) – 2:43
6. "Blind Dog" (Blake) – 2:54
7. "Everybody Works But Father" (Traditional) – 3:28
8. "Fifty Miles of Elbow Room" (A. P. Carter) – 3:49
9. "Shallegra" (Blake) – 2:56
10. "Old Time Farmer" (Blake) – 4:37
11. "Wreck of the Old '97" (Norman Blake, Johnny Cash, Bob Johnson) – 3:46
12. "Black Mountain Rag" (Traditional) – 2:25

== Personnel ==
- Norman Blake – guitar, fiddle, vocals
- Nancy Blake – guitar, cello, vocals

Production notes

- Bill Wolf – engineer
- Edd Miller – assistant engineer
- Susan Marsh – design
- Senor McGuire – photography
