= Backwaters (album) =

Studio album by Tony Rice Unit
- Released: 1982
- Genre: Americana, bluegrass, folk
- Label: Rounder

Tony Rice chronology
The Bluegrass Album (1981)	Backwaters (1982)	Bluegrass Album, Vol. 2 (1982)

Professional ratings
Review scores
Source	Rating
AllMusic	5/5 stars

Backwaters is an album by American guitarist Tony Rice, released in 1982. It is credited to The Tony Rice Unit.

== Track listing ==
1. "Common Ground" (Tony Rice) – 7:39
2. "Just Some Bar In The French Quarters" (Rice) – 3:02
3. "Backwaters" (Rice) – 6:08
4. "My Favorite Things" (Oscar Hammerstein II, Richard Rodgers) – 5:14
5. "A Child is Born" (Dave Grusin) – 3:34
6. "On Green Dolphin Street" (Bronisław Kaper, Ned Washington) – 3:33
7. "Mobius Mambo" (Rice) – 5:27

== Personnel ==
- Tony Rice – guitar
- Wyatt Rice – guitar
- John Reischman – mandolin
- Fred Carpenter – violin
- Richard Greene – violin
- Todd Phillips – bass

== Production notes ==
- Producer – Anthony Rice
- Recording Engineer – Bob Shumaker
- Recording Studio – 1750 Arch Studios, Berkeley, CA
- Recorded – March 1982
