= Crossings (Tony Rice album) =

Studio album by Tony Rice
- Released: December 6, 1994
- Genre: Americana, bluegrass, folk, gospel
- Length: Tim Surrett, David Johnson
- Label: Mountain Home Records
- Producer: Tony Rice, Bill Wolf

Tony Rice chronology
The Rice Brothers 2 (1993)	Crossings (1994)	Tone Poems (1994)

Professional ratings
Review scores
Source	Rating
AllMusic	4/5 stars

Crossings is a gospel album by American guitarist Tony Rice, released in 1994.

== Track listing ==
1. "In the Sweet By and By" (Traditional, Joseph P. Webster)
2. "I Have Decided to Follow Jesus"
3. "Swing Low, Sweet Chariot" (Traditional)
4. "Holy, Holy, Holy"
5. "Living by Faith"
6. "Amazing Grace" (John Newton)
7. "Victory in Jesus"
8. "Sweet Hour of Prayer" (Traditional)
9. "I Feel Like Traveling On"
10. "Just as I Am" (Charlotte Elliott)
11. "Are You Washed in the Blood?" (Traditional)
12. "Doxology"

== Personnel ==
- Tony Rice – guitar, vocals
- David Johnson – banjo, fiddle, guitar, harmonica, mandolin, viola, banjolin, dobro
- Tim Surrett – Bass
- Ben Isaacs – Bass
- Tony Creasman – drums, percussion

Production notes:

- David Johnson – producer, arranger
- Tim Surrett – producer
- Mickey Gamble – executive producer
- Tony Rice – mixing
- Eddie Swan – engineer, mixing
- Kevin Ward – assistant engineer
- Laura Carroll – cover design
- Jeff Collins – cover design
- John Miller – photography
