= Kent Stage =

Theater in Kent, Ohio

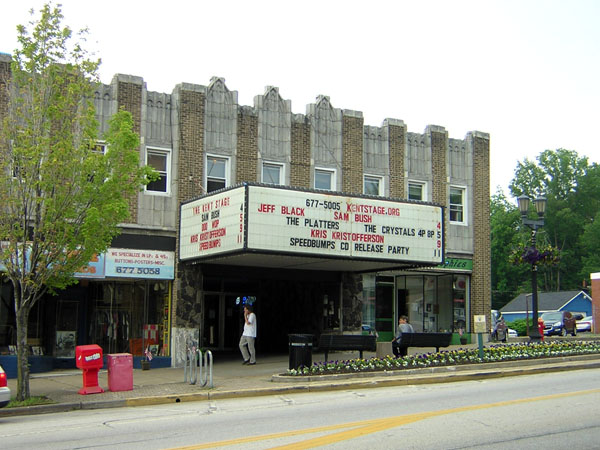
- Interactive map of Kent Stage
- Location: 175 East Main Street; Kent, Ohio, USA
- Coordinates: 41°9′14.12″N 81°21′23.83″W
- Owner: Western Reserve Folk Arts Association
- Capacity: 642 (since 2002)
- Type: performance hall

Construction
- Built: 1927
- Opened: 1927 as Flannigan and Steele Theater; 2002 as Kent Stage

Website
- www.kentstage.org

The Kent Stage is a 642-seat theater that was built in 1927 in Kent, Ohio, United States. Since 2002, it has been used as a performance venue for music, plays and film.

== History ==
In 1927, it opened as the Flannigan and Steele Theater, a movie theater, and has been a place for entertainment in Kent since then. The Western Reserve Folk Arts Association, a non-profit organization, opened the Kent Stage in 2002, primarily holding various musical performances by nationally known performers at the venue.

Many well-known artists have performed at the Kent Stage, including such names as Bo Diddley, Joan Baez, Stephen Stills, Kris Kristofferson, Ani DiFranco, Tom Paxton, Richie Havens, The Avett Brothers, Old Crow Medicine Show, Janis Ian, Peter Rowan and Tony Rice, Melanie, Loudon Wainwright III, The Kingston Trio, Leo Kottke, John Gorka, Leon Redbone, Al Stewart, Pete Best, Ralph Stanley and the Clinch Mountain Boys, Sam Bush, John Cowan, Vassar Clements, Rosanne Cash, The Wailers, Little Feat, Nickel Creek, India Arie, Machine Gun Kelly, Tim O'Brien, Justin Hayward, and many others. The venue has also hosted the Children's Musical Theater of Kent, the Kent Blues Festival, Up From The River Music Festival, and since 2002 the Kent State Folk Festival.
