= Unit of Measure (album) =

Studio album by Tony Rice Unit
- Released: October 31, 2000
- Genre: Americana, bluegrass, folk
- Label: Rounder
- Producer: Tony Rice, Bill Wolf

Tony Rice chronology
Rice, Rice, Hillman & Pedersen (1999)	Unit of Measure (2000)	Pizza Tapes (2000)

Professional ratings
Review scores
Source	Rating
Allmusic	3/5 stars

Unit of Measure is an album by American guitarist Tony Rice, released in 2000. It is credited to The Tony Rice Unit.

== Track listing ==
1. "Manzanita" (Tony Rice) – 3:53
2. "House of the Rising Sun" (Traditional) – 5:26
3. "Shenandoah" (Traditional) – 4:40
4. "Gold Rush" (Bill Monroe) – 3:02
5. "Jerusalem Ridge" (Monroe) – 6:38
6. "High Noon (Do Not Forsake Me)" (Dimitri Tiomkin, Ned Washington) – 3:44
7. "Beaumont Rag" (Traditional) – 3:37
8. "Swing '42" (Django Reinhardt) – 1:56
9. "An Olde Irish Aire (Danny Boy)" (Traditional) – 2:07
10. "Sally Goodin'" (Traditional) – 8:31

== Personnel ==
- Tony Rice – guitar
- Wyatt Rice – guitar
- Jimmy Gaudreau – mandolin
- Rickie Simpkins – fiddle
- Ronnie Simpkins – bass

Production notes:

- Tony Rice – producer, engineer, song notes
- Bill Wolf – producer, engineer, mixing, mastering, photography
- Buck Parker – engineer, mixing, photography
- Scott Alarik – liner notes
