= Night Flyer: The Singer Songwriter Collection =

Compilation album by Tony Rice
- Released: July 29, 2008
- Genre: Americana, bluegrass, folk
- Label: Rounder

Tony Rice chronology
58957:The Bluegrass Guitar Collection (2003)	Night Flyer: The Singer Songwriter Collection (2008)

Professional ratings
Review scores
Source	Rating
Allmusic	3.5/5 stars

Night Flyer: The Singer Songwriter Collection is a compilation album by American guitarist Tony Rice, released in 2008.

Previously unreleased tracks include "Pony", "Never Meant to Be", and "About Love".

== Track listing ==
1. "Never Meant to Be" (Tony Rice) – 4:08
2. "Urge for Going" (Joni Mitchell) – 5:50
3. "Me and My Guitar" (James Taylor) – 3:59
4. "St. James Hospital" (James Baker) – 5:00
5. "John Wilkes Booth" (Mary Chapin Carpenter) – 3:54
6. "Four Strong Winds" (Ian Tyson) – 4:00
7. "Night Flyer" (John Mayall) – 4:01
8. "He Rode All the Way to Texas" (John Starling) – 3:32
9. "About Love" (Rice) – 3:43
10. "Changes" (Phil Ochs) – 2:21
11. "Sweetheart Like You" (Bob Dylan) – 4:33
12. "Green Light on the Southern" (Norman Blake) – 3:24
13. "Hard Love" (Bob Franke) – 4:23
14. "Why You Been Gone So Long" (Mickey Newbury) – 3:21
15. "Wayfaring Stranger" (Traditional) – 5:22
16. "Likes of Me" (Jerry Reed) – 2:53
17. "Pony" (Tom Waits) – 4:23
