= Skaggs & Rice =

Studio album by Ricky Skaggs, Tony Rice
- Released: 1980 (original); 2012 (reissue)
- Studios: Arch St. Studios (Berkeley, California); Studio By The Pond (Hendersonville, Tennessee)
- Genres: Americana, bluegrass, folk
- Length: 27:35
- Label: Sugar Hill

Tony Rice chronology
Mar West (1980)	Skaggs & Rice (1980)	Still Inside (1981)

Ricky Skaggs chronology
Sweet Temptation (1979)	Skaggs & Rice (1980)	Waitin' for the Sun to Shine (1981)

Professional ratings
Review scores
Source	Rating
Allmusic	4.5/5 stars

Skaggs & Rice is an album by American guitarist Tony Rice and multi-instrumentalist Ricky Skaggs, released in 1980. The album was reissued in April 2012.

== Track listing ==
1. "Bury Me Beneath the Willow" (Traditional) – 2:43
2. "Mansions For Me" (Bill Monroe) – 3:39
3. "There's More Pretty Girls Than One" (Traditional) – 2:58
4. "Memories Of Mother And Dad" (Albert Price) – 2:28
5. "Where The Soul Of Man Never Dies" (Traditional) – 2:27
6. "Talk About Suffering" (Traditional) – 2:10
7. "Will The Roses Bloom (Where She Lies Sleeping)" (Bevins Brothers) – 2:47
8. "Tennessee Blues" (Bill Monroe) – 2:49
9. "The Old Crossroads" (Charlie Monroe) – 2:42
10. "Have You Someone (In Heaven Awaiting)" (Carter Stanley, Ralph Stanley) – 2:52

== Personnel ==
- Tony Rice – guitar, vocals
- Ricky Skaggs – mandolin, vocals

Production

- Richard Adler – engineer
- Donivan Cowart – remix engineer (3, 10)
- Connie Potter – assistant engineer
- Jim Lloyd – digital mastering at Masterfonics (Nashville, Tennessee)
- Raymond Simone – jacket design, illustrations
- Lee Poole – layout
- Jon Sievert – CD photography
