= The Pizza Tapes =

Studio album by Jerry Garcia, David Grisman, Tony Rice
- Released: April 25, 2000
- Recorded: February 4–5, 1993
- Studio: Dawg Studios
- Genres: Folk, bluegrass
- Length: 73:58
- Label: Acoustic Disc
- Producer: David Grisman

Jerry Garcia and David Grisman chronology
| So What (1998) | The Pizza Tapes (2000) | Grateful Dawg (2001) |

Jerry Garcia chronology
| Mother McCree's Uptown Jug Champions (1999) | The Pizza Tapes (2000) | Don't Let Go (2001) |

David Grisman chronology
| Tone Poems 3 (1999) | The Pizza Tapes (2000) | Grateful Dawg (2000) |

Tony Rice chronology
| Unit of Measure (2000) | The Pizza Tapes (2000) | Runnin' Wild (2001) |

Professional ratings
Review scores
| Source | Rating |
|---|---|
| AllMusic | 3/5 stars |
| The Music Box | 4/5 stars |
| Salon | (favorable) |

The Pizza Tapes is an album by Jerry Garcia (acoustic guitar, vocals), David Grisman (mandolin), and Tony Rice (acoustic guitar). It was recorded at Grisman's studio on two evenings in 1993, and features unrehearsed performances of folk and bluegrass songs. It was released on the Acoustic Disc label on April 25, 2000.

== History ==
The long-standing musical relationship between Garcia and Grisman began with Grisman's mandolin work on select tracks on the American Beauty album as well as a collaboration with Peter Rowan, John Kahn, and Vassar Clements in the bluegrass band Old & In the Way. Rice's work with Grisman on their joint album Tone Poems would earn him a place in these historic recordings with Garcia.

In February 1993, Grisman was playing with Rice and invited Garcia to his studio. Over the nights of February 4 and February 5, the trio recorded what would be known as The Pizza Tapes.

Garcia's copy was supposedly given to a pizza delivery person as a tip and, not long after, Grisman heard a song on the radio in New York City. Fans started bringing tapes to Grateful Dead shows for autographs, and shortly after, the band confiscated a box of bootleg CDs of the session.

Grisman said, "[a]fter several years of being pissed off (about their illegal release), I decided to bury the hatchet...and make these tapes available...." The tapes were released (seven years later), after the album with the songs in the order recorded, with a few mistakes, false starts, and some talking between musicians.

The Pizza Tapes contains the only known version of Garcia performing "Amazing Grace", which was played only after Pam Rice, Tony Rice's wife, requested it.

Rice gave credit to the late Garcia and wrote, "I wish there were words that would express my gratitude for being a part of it. Perhaps just knowing that Garcia might be smiling somewhere saying, 'Dawg can we hear that take again?' will suffice."

In 2010, Grisman's online label Acoustic Oasis released The Pizza Tapes: Extra Large Edition offering 170 minutes of music, including 16 previously unissued alternate takes in addition to the original master takes in their original sequence. In addition to new music, the expanded edition also features more of the personal repartee that characterized the initial release.

== Track listing ==
1. "Appetizer" – 0:13
2. "Man of Constant Sorrow" (traditional) – 5:06
3. "Appetizer" – 0:29
4. "Louis Collins" (Mississippi John Hurt) – 5:57
5. "Shady Jam" (Jerry Garcia, David Grisman, Tony Rice) – 3:41
6. "Shady Grove" (trad.) – 4:45
7. "Always Late" (Lefty Frizzell, Blackie Crawford) – 0:54
8. "Guitar Space" (Garcia, Rice) / "Summertime" (George Gershwin, Ira Gershwin, Dubose Heyward) – 8:41
9. "Appetizer" – 0:26
10. "Long Black Veil" (Danny Dill, Marijohn Wilkin) – 4:30
11. "Rosa Lee McFall" (trad.) – 3:12
12. "Appetizer" – 1:13
13. "Drifting Too Far From The Shore" (Charles Moody) – 4:54
14. "Amazing Grace" (trad.) – 4:54
15. "Little Sadie" (trad.) – 3:13
16. "Knockin' on Heaven's Door" (Bob Dylan) – 5:47
17. "Space Jam" – 0:59
18. "So What" (Miles Davis) – 6:28
19. "Appetizer" – 0:22
20. "House of the Rising Sun" (trad.) – 8:05

== Personnel ==
- Jerry Garcia – guitar, vocals
- David Grisman – mandolin
- Tony Rice – guitar

== Production ==
- Producer – David Grisman
- Executive producer – Craig Miller
- Recording, mixing – David Dennison
- Mastering – Paul Stubblebine
- Production assistant – Rob Bleetstein
- Photography – Pamela Rice, Dexter Johnson
- Design, layout – D. Brent Hauseman
- Liner notes – David Grisman, Tony Rice

== Samples ==
Always Late
"Always Late" from The Pizza Tapes
