= Manzanita (Tony Rice album) =

Studio album by Tony Rice Unit
- Released: 1979
- Genre: Americana, bluegrass, folk
- Length: 37:35
- Label: Rounder
- Producer: Tony Rice

Tony Rice chronology
Acoustics (1977)	Manzanita (1979)	Mar West (1980)

Professional ratings
Review scores
Source	Rating
Allmusic	4.5/5 stars

Manzanita is an album by American guitarist Tony Rice, released in 1979. It is credited to the Tony Rice Unit.

Manzanita is considered a breakthrough album that combines traditional bluegrass and folk songs with more progressive playing. It shows not only Tony Rice's instrumental and vocal talent, but also his strong all-star back-up band, consisting of Sam Bush, Ricky Skaggs, Jerry Douglas, David Grisman, Darol Anger and Todd Phillips.

== Track listing ==
1. "Old Train" (Herb Pedersen) – 2:08
2. "Manzanita" (Tony Rice) – 4:46
3. "Little Sadie" (Traditional) – 2:45
4. "Blackberry Blossom" (Traditional) – 2:36
5. "Nine Pound Hammer" (Merle Travis) – 2:36
6. "Hold Whatcha Got" (Jimmy Martin) – 2:45
7. "Blue Railroad Train" (Alton Delmore, Rabon Delmore) – 3:18
8. "Ginseng Sullivan" (Norman Blake) – 3:05
9. "Midnight On The Stormy Deep" (Traditional) – 4:05
10. "I Hope You Have Learned" (James Baker, Bill Carrigan) – 2:33
11. "Stony Point" (Traditional) – 2:48
12. "Home from the Forest" (Gordon Lightfoot) – 4:10

== Personnel ==
- Tony Rice – guitar, vocals
- Darol Anger – violin
- Sam Bush – mandolin, violin, vocals
- David Grisman – mandolin
- Jerry Douglas – dobro
- Ricky Skaggs – mandolin, violin, vocals
- Todd Phillips – bass

Production notes

- Tony Rice – producer
- Bill Wolf – engineer, mixing
