= New South (band) =

American bluegrass band

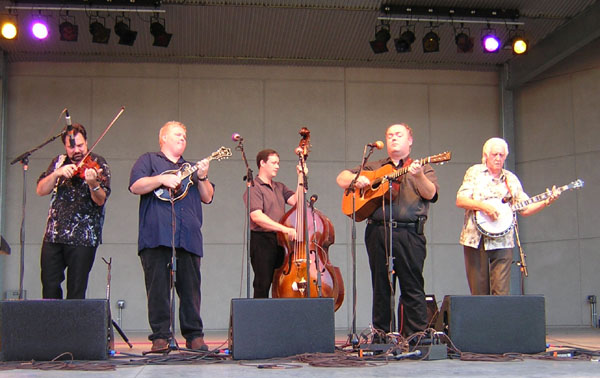
- The New South performing with J. D. Crowe on August 8, 2008.

Background information
- Origin: Kentucky, United States
- Genres: Bluegrass
- Years active: 1973–present
- Labels: Rounder, Starday
- Members: Rickey Wasson; Dwight McCall; John Bowman; Steve Thomas
- Past members: Doyle Lawson; Tony Rice; Larry Rice; Bobby Slone; Ricky Skaggs; Jerry Douglas; Keith Whitley; Glenn Lawson; Jimmy Gaudreau; Mike Gregory; Steve Bryant; Tony King; Phil Leadbetter; Richard Bennett; Robert Hale; Randy Hayes; Paul Adkins; Darrell Webb; Curt Chapman; Barry Crabtree; Harold Nixon; Ron Stewart; Scott Risner

The New South is a bluegrass band formed in 1971 by banjo player J. D. Crowe. Their first two albums, Bluegrass Evolution and the eponymous record known by the album number, "Rounder 0044", established them as a dominant force in bluegrass, though the two albums are wildly different.

== Band members ==
The New South have recorded and toured with a variety of different lineups. One of the most notable lineup changes came in 2002 when the entire band quit out of desire for a more active performing schedule, forming the band Wildfire. Crowe quickly found replacements (rehiring mandolinist/vocalist Dwight McCall and guitarist/ vocalist Rickey Wasson who had both been members previously) and the New South has continued a moderate performance schedule.

Current and past members include: J.D. Crowe, Doyle Lawson, Tony Rice, Larry Rice, Bobby Slone, Ricky Skaggs, Jerry Douglas, Keith Whitley, Jimmy Gaudreau, Mike Gregory, Steve Bryant, Paul Adkins, Tony King, Phil Leadbetter, Richard Bennett, Don Rigsby, Robert Hale, Darrell Webb, Curt Chapman, Dwight McCall, Rickey Wasson, Wayne Fields, Harold Nixon, Randy Hayes, and Ron Stewart.

== Key recordings ==
=== The Kentucky Mountain Boys ===
J.D. Crowe formed the prototype for the New South, the Kentucky Mountain Boys, around 1964. Members of the line-up included Red Allen, Larry Rice, Bobby Slone, and Doyle Lawson. The group recorded three albums on Lemco Records: Bluegrass Holiday, Ramblin' Boy, and a gospel album, The Model Church. Lawson left the group in 1971 to join the Country Gentlemen, and was replaced by Larry Rice's younger brother, Tony Rice, a guitar prodigy and student of Clarence White.

=== Bluegrass Evolution ===
The first album recorded as the "New South" was Bluegrass Evolution. This album seems to have been influenced by the Osborne Brothers and by more mainstream country music; it incorporates drums, pedal steel and electric instruments to a far greater degree than most bluegrass bands of the period.

=== J.D. Crowe & The New South ("Rounder 0044") ===
After Bluegrass Evolution, Larry Rice left the band. A young Ricky Skaggs replaced him, and Jerry Douglas also joined the group for this 1975 eponymously titled album, more commonly known by its Rounder Records catalogue number ("Rounder 0044"). Stylistically, this album marked a sharp turn from Bluegrass Evolution, while still experimenting with pedal steel, percussion and a piano on the tracks "You Are What I Am" and "Cryin' Holy", the majority of the album featured songs played with traditional bluegrass instrumentation (although on the slower numbers, Skaggs doubled his fiddle with a viola) by up-and-coming singer songwriters such as Gordon Lightfoot, Utah Phillips and Rodney Crowell, as well as incorporating more traditional songs such as "Old Home Place", "Some Old Day", and "Sally Goodin". This one album changed the nature and direction of bluegrass music to a large extent.

=== The Keith Whitley Years ===
Not long after Rounder 0044's release, Tony Rice departed the band to join David Grisman's band. Skaggs and Douglas soon followed suit, forming their own band, Boone Creek. After experimenting with a few lineups, Crowe hired bassist Steve Bryant, mandolinist Jimmy Gadreau, as well as former Ralph Stanley guitarist Keith Whitley. This band produced three albums: My Home Ain't In the Hall of Fame, Live in Japan, and Somewhere Between. All three of these albums saw the band returning toward the sound of the Bluegrass Evolution album, incorporating more country elements, with Crowe even playing electric guitar more than banjo on "Somewhere Between".

== Discography ==
- Bluegrass Evolution (Starday SLP 489, recorded 1973, released 1977)
- J.D. Crowe & the New South (Rounder 0044, 1975)
- You Can Share My Blanket (Rounder 0096, 1977)
- My Home Ain't In The Hall of Fame (Rounder, 1978)
- Somewhere Between (Rounder, 1981)
- Live In Japan (Rounder, 1982)
- Straight Ahead (Rounder, 1986)
- Flashback (Rounder, 1994)
- Come On Down To My World (Rounder, 1999)
- At Bean Blossom: Uncle Pen Days (2000)
- Lefty's Old Guitar (Rounder, 2006)
