= Rice, Rice, Hillman & Pedersen =

Studio album by Rice, Rice, Hillman & Pedersen
- Released: 1999
- Genre: Americana, folk, progressive bluegrass
- Label: Rounder
- Producer: Rice, Rice, Hillman & Pedersen

Rice, Rice, Hillman & Pedersen chronology
Out of the Woodwork (1997)	Rice, Rice, Hillman & Pedersen (1999)	Runnin' Wild (2001)

Tony Rice chronology
Out Of The Woodwork (1997)	Rice, Rice, Hillman & Pedersen (1999)	Unit of Measure (2000)

Professional ratings
Review scores
Source	Rating
Allmusic	4/5 stars

Rice, Rice, Hillman & Pedersen is a collaboration album by American guitarist Tony Rice, his brother, mandolinist Larry Rice, guitar and banjo player Herb Pedersen and guitar/bass player Chris Hillman, founding member of famous folk-rock band from the late 1960s, the Byrds. It is their follow-up on the first album they made together in 1997, Out Of The Woodwork.

== Track listing ==
1. "Doesn't Mean That Much Anymore" (Hillman) 2:33
2. "Side Effects of Love" (Rice) 2:24
3. "One of These Days" (Montgomery) 2:40
4. "Never Ending Song of Love" (Bramlett) 3:07
5. "Friend of the Devil" (Dawson, Garcia, Hunter) 3:16
6. "Out Among the Stars" (Mitchell) 4:14
7. "Moonshine" (Buchanan) 3:37
8. "Moment of Glory" (Hillman) 3:21
9. "The Year of El Nino" (Rice) 4:34
10. "Hearts Overflowing" (Brewer) 4:17
11. "I Will" (Hillman) 2:45
12. "The Walkin' Blues" (Hillman) 2:33
13. "I'll Be On That Good Road Someday" (Phillips) 3:00

== Personnel ==
- Tony Rice – guitar
- Larry Rice – mandolin, vocals
- Chris Hillman – bass, guitar, vocals
- Herb Pedersen – banjo, guitar, vocals

with

- Fred Travers – Dobro
- Ronnie Simpkins – bass
- Rickie Simpkins – violin
