= Native American (album) =

Studio album by Tony Rice
- Released: 1988
- Genre: Americana, bluegrass, folk
- Length: 42:28
- Label: Rounder
- Producer: Tony Rice, John Jennings, Bill Wolf

Tony Rice chronology
Devlin (1990)	Native American (1988)	Bluegrass Album, Vol. 5 - Sweet Sunny South (1989)

Professional ratings
Review scores
Source	Rating
Allmusic	2/5 stars

Native American is an album by the American guitarist Tony Rice, released in 1988.

== Track listing ==
1. "Shadows" (Gordon Lightfoot) – 3:43
2. "St. James Hospital" (James Baker) – 4:59
3. "Night Flyer" (John Mayall) – 4:00
4. "Why Have You Been Gone So Long" (Mickey Newbury) – 3:22
5. "Urge for Going" (Joni Mitchell) – 5:51
6. "Go My Way" (Lightfoot) – 2:48
7. "Nothin' Like a Hundred Miles" (James Taylor) – 4:21
8. "Changes" (Phil Ochs) – 2:21
9. "Brother to the Wind" (Craig Bickhardt, F.C. Collins) – 3:28
10. "John Wilkes Booth" (Mary Chapin Carpenter) – 3:52
11. "Summer Wages" (Ian Tyson) – 4:03

== Personnel ==
- Tony Rice – guitar, vocals
- Vassar Clements – fiddle
- Jerry Douglas – dobro
- Robbie Magruder – drums
- Mark Schatz – bass
- Rico Petrucelli – bass
- Wyatt Rice – guitar
- John Jennings – guitar
- John Edwards – harmonica, background vocals
- Jimmy Gaudreau – mandolin
- Mary Chapin Carpenter – harmony vocals, background vocals
- Jon Carroll – piano, keyboards, background vocals

Production notes

- Tony Rice – producer
- John Jennings – producer
- Bill Wolf – producer, engineer, mixing
- Joanna Bodenweber – design
- Mark Farris – photography
