= Church Street Blues =

Studio album by Tony Rice
- Released: 1983
- Genre: Americana, bluegrass, folk
- Length: 37:19
- Label: Sugar Hill
- Producer: Tony Rice

Tony Rice chronology
Backwaters (1982)	Church Street Blues (1983)	Cold on the Shoulder (1984)

Professional ratings
Review scores
Source	Rating
Allmusic	4.5/5 stars

Church Street Blues is an album by American guitarist Tony Rice, released in 1983. It is a folk oriented album, featuring only Tony Rice on guitar and vocals, except for four songs with his brother, Wyatt Rice on rhythm guitar. Should be noted, the album is named after the first track, written by Norman Blake - "Church Street Blues".

== Track listing ==
1. "Church Street Blues" (Norman Blake) – 3:08
2. "Cattle in the Cane" (Traditional) – 1:56
3. "Streets of London" (Ralph McTell) – 4:00
4. "One More Night" (Bob Dylan) – 2:14
5. "The Gold Rush" (Bill Monroe, Byron Berline) – 2:18
6. "Any Old Time" (Jimmie Rodgers) – 2:39
7. "Orphan Annie" (Blake) – 2:50
8. "House Carpenter" (Traditional) – 4:27
9. "Jerusalem Ridge" (Monroe) – 3:27
10. "Last Thing on My Mind" (Tom Paxton) – 3:18
11. "Pride of Man" (Hamilton Camp) – 2:22
12. "The Wreck of the Edmund Fitzgerald" (Gordon Lightfoot) – 4:59

== Personnel ==
- Tony Rice – guitar, vocals
- Wyatt Rice – guitar

Production notes:

- Tony Rice – producer
- Bill Wolf – engineer
- Bob Shumaker – engineer, mixing
- Jim Lloyd – mastering
