= J. D. Crowe & The New South =

Studio album by J. D. Crowe
- Released: 1975
- Genre: Progressive bluegrass, country
- Length: 31:03
- Label: Rounder
- Producer: J. D. Crowe

J. D. Crowe chronology
Bluegrass Evolution (1973)	J. D. Crowe & The New South (1975)	You Can Share My Blanket (1977)

Tony Rice chronology
Bluegrass Evolution (1973)	J. D. Crowe & The New South (1975)	California Autumn (1975)

Professional ratings
Review scores
Source	Rating
AllMusic	5/5 stars

J. D. Crowe & The New South is an album by American banjo player J. D. Crowe and the New South, released in 1975. It was reissued on CD in 1992.

== Background ==
After Bluegrass Evolution, Ricky Skaggs replaced Larry Rice and Jerry Douglas joined the group for this eponymously titled album, more commonly known by its Rounder Records catalogue number ("Rounder 0044"). Stylistically, this album marked a sharp turn from Bluegrass Evolution as the majority of the album includes traditional bluegrass instrumentation on songs by up-and-coming singer-songwriters such as Gordon Lightfoot, Utah Phillips and Rodney Crowell, as well as incorporating traditional songs.

== Legacy ==
In 2024, the album was selected to the National Recording Registry by the Library of Congress as being "culturally, historically, and/or aesthetically significant".

== Track listing ==
1. "Old Home Place" (Mitch Jayne, Dean Webb) – 2:42
2. "Some Old Day" (Louise Certain, Gladys Stacey) – 2:25
3. "Rock Salt and Nails" (Bruce Phillips) – 2:58
4. "Sally Goodin'" (Traditional) – 3:11
5. "Ten Degrees And Getting Colder" (Gordon Lightfoot) – 2:13
6. "Nashville Blues" (Earl Scruggs) – 3:23
7. "You Are What I Am" (Lightfoot) – 2:17
8. "Summer Wages" (Ian Tyson) – 4:21
9. "I'm Walkin'" (Fats Domino, Dave Bartholomew) – 2:05
10. "Home Sweet Home Revisited" (Rodney Crowell) – 3:17
11. "Cryin' Holy" (Traditional) – 2:11
