= J. D. Crowe =

American musician and band leader (1937–2021)

J.D. Crowe
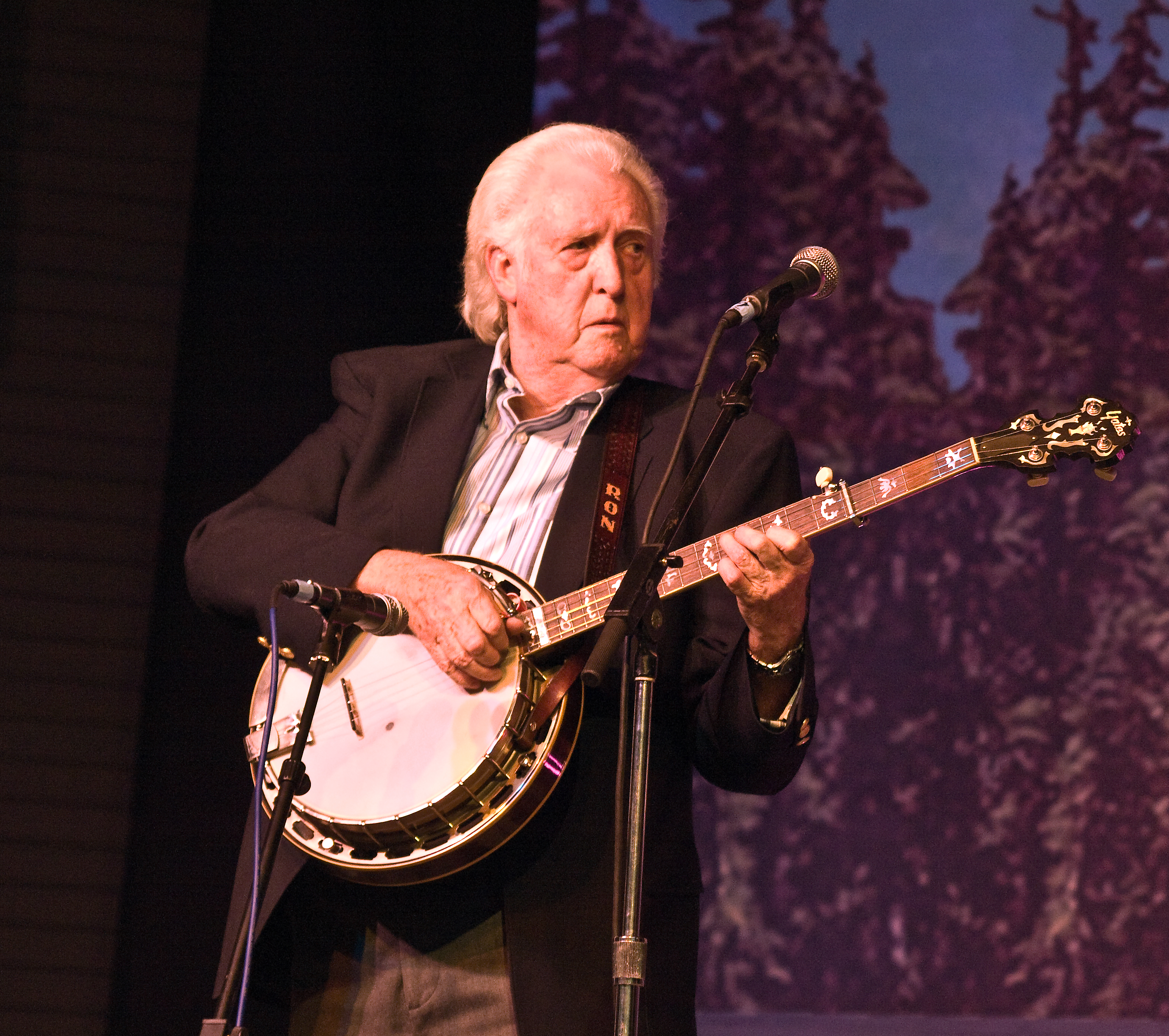
- Crowe performing in 2009

Background information
- Born: James Dee Crowe; August 27, 1937; Lexington, Kentucky, U.S.
- Died: December 24, 2021 (aged 84) Nicholasville, Kentucky, U.S.
- Genres: Bluegrass, progressive bluegrass
- Occupation: Musician
- Instruments: Banjo, vocals, guitar
- Years active: 1956–2015
- Labels: Rounder, Starday, Rebel, Lemco, King Bluegrass

James Dee Crowe (August 27, 1937 – December 24, 2021) was an American banjo player and bluegrass band leader. He first became known during his four-year stint with Jimmy Martin in the 1950s. Crowe led the bluegrass group New South from 1971 until his death in 2021.

== Life and career ==
James Dee Crowe was born on August 27, 1937, in Lexington, Kentucky. He began playing the banjo early on and was offered a job with Jimmy Martin's Sunny Mountain Boys, a backup group in 1954. Before starting in Martin's band, Crowe played with Pee Wee Lambert and Curly Parker.

Crowe recorded with Martin between 1956 and 1960. In 1961, he formed the Kentucky Mountain Boys, principally performing in the Lexington region.

In 1971, Crowe changed the band's name to The New South. As of 1975, the New South began to add jazz and rock influences to its bluegrass repertoire, as well as country and folk elements drawn from the work of Gram Parsons and Gordon Lightfoot, respectively.

Crowe stopped releasing new records between the late 1980s and 1992, when he founded a new band.

Kentucky Educational Television in 2008 aired a biography of James Dee Crowe, A Kentucky Treasure: The James Dee Crowe Story, produced by H. Russell Farmer.

Crowe received the Bluegrass Star Award, presented by the Bluegrass Heritage Foundation of Dallas, Texas, on October 15, 2011. The award is bestowed upon bluegrass artists who do an exemplary job of advancing traditional bluegrass music and bringing it to new audiences while preserving its character and heritage.

He died from pneumonia on December 24, 2021, in Nicholasville, Kentucky, at the age of 84.

== Discography ==
=== At first: J.D. Crowe with Jimmy Martin & the Sunny Mountain Boys ===
J.D. Crowe has recorded 42 studio tracks with Jimmy Martin from late 1956 to August 1960, then in September 1963 and November 1966. A part of these corresponding works has been released in the following LPs (among others):

- 1960: Good 'N Country (Decca DL7-4016 : tracks: A1-B1, B3-B6, with Paul Williams: Mandolin, except A5)
- 1964: WidowmakerWidowmaker Decca DL 4536)
- 1966: Big and Country Instrumentals, (Decca DL7-4891, tracks: A1-A4 and B2, with Vernon Derrick: mandolin, Buddy Spicher: fiddle, Bill Yates (bass) - B5: recorded in 1963, with Bill Torbert: mandolin, Tater Tate: fiddle]))
- J.D. Crowe recorded 42 studio tracks with Jimmy Martin, all of which appear in chronological order on the 5CD box-set : Jimmy Martin And Sunny Mountain Boys 1954-1974 (Bear Family BCD-15705); tracks 11–43, 73–76, 107–111)
- 1984 Big Jam Session Recorded Live in 1959 at Johnny Sanders house, Lubbock, TX], with Paul Williams: mandolin and Terry Smith: bass (Old Homestead OH-159).

=== J.D. Crowe and the Kentucky Mountain Boys ===
- 1968: Bluegrass Holiday (with Red Allen (guitar), Doyle Lawson (mandolin), Bobby Slone (bass) (Lemco LP-609, reissued in 1981 on Rebel REB-1598.
- 1970: Ramblin' Boy (Lemco LP-610 – reissued as Blackjack in 1978: Rebel SLP-1583)(Doyle Lawson (guitar, vocal), Larry Rice (mandolin), Bobby Slone (bass)).
- 1971: The Model Church (Lemco LP-reissued in 1978: Rebel SLP-1585)(Doyle Lawson (guitar, vocal), Larry Rice (mandolin), Bobby Slone (bass))
- 1973: Bluegrass Evolution(with Tony Rice: (guitar Lead Vocals) & Larry Rice: (Mandolin)) (recorded by Starday, April 1973; released in 1978 by Gusto GT-0010)

=== J.D. Crowe and the New South ===
- 1975: J. D. Crowe & The New South (Rounder 0044) (with Tony Rice (guitar, lead Vocals), Jerry Douglas (Resonator Guitar), Ricky Skaggs (Fiddle, Viola, Mandolin), Bobby Slone (bass).
- 1978: You Can Share My Blanket (Rounder 0096) (with Glenn Lawson (guitar, lead Vocals), Jimmy Gaudreau (mandolin), Bobby Slone (fiddle), Randy Best (e-bass); guests: Jim Murphy (Steel Guitar, Dobro), Charlie McCoy (Harmonica), Karl Himmel (drums).
- 1980: My Home Ain't in the Hall of Fame (Rounder 0103) (with Keith Whitley, (guitar, lead vocals), Jimmy Gaudreau, (mandolin), Bobby Slone (fiddle), Steve Bryant, (e-bass) guests: Doug Jernigan (steel guitar, dobro), Jimmy Ashby (drums).
- 1982: Somewhere Between (Rounder 0153) (with Keith Whitley, (guitar, lead vocals), Wendy Miller (mandolin), Bobby Slone (fiddle), Steve Bryant (e-bass), guests: Doug Jernigan (steel guitar, dobro), Kenny Malone (drums), Pete Wade (e-guitar), The Jordanaires (Harmony Vocals))
- 1982: Live in Japan (Rounder 0159) recorded in Tokyo, 11-1979 (with Keith Whitley (guitar, lead vocals), Jimmy Gaudreau (mandolin), Bobby Slone (fiddle), Steve Bryant (e-bass))
- 1986: Straight Ahead (Rounder 0202) (with Tony King (guitar, lead vocals), Wendy Miller, Sam Bush (mandolin), Bobby Slone (fiddle), Jerry Douglas (Resonator Guitar), Randy Hayes (bass, drums)
- 1994: Flashback (Rounder CD 0322) (Richard Bennett (guitar, lead vocals), Don Rigsby (mandolin), Phil Leadbetter (Resonator Guitar), Randy Howard (Fiddle), Curt Chapman (bass)).
- 1999: Come On Down to My World (Rounder 0422) (Greg Luc (Guitar, Lead Vocals), Buddy Spicher, Glen Duncan (Fiddle), Dwight McCall (mandolin), Phil Leadbetter (Resonator Guitar, Rickey Wasson (guitar), Curt Chapman (bass)
- 2006: Lefty's Old Guitar (Rounder 0512) (Rickey Wasson (Guitar, Lead Vocals), Dwight McCall (mandolin), Ron Stewart (fiddle), Harold Nixon (bass))

=== The Bluegrass Album Band ===
Bluegrass Album Band band members: Tony Rice (guitar), J.D. Crowe (banjo), Doyle Lawson (mandolin), Bobby Hicks (Fiddle), Todd Phillips, except 1989: Mark Schatz (bass); additional member - since 1983 (Vol 5 & 6): Jerry Douglas - since 1989 (Vol 6): Vassar Clements

- 1980: The Bluegrass Album (Rounder 0140)
- 1982: The Bluegrass Album, Vol.2 (Rounder 0164)
- 1983: The Bluegrass Album, Vol.3: California Connection (Rounder 0180)
- 1984: The Bluegrass Album, Vol.4 (Rounder 0210)
- 1989: The Bluegrass Album, Vol.5: Sweet Sunny South (Rounder 0240)
- 1996: The Bluegrass Album, Vol.6: Bluegrass Instrumentals (Rounder 0330)

=== Crowe, Lawson & Williams ===
- 2010: Old Friends Get Together (Mountain Home MH 1292)
- 2014: Standing Tall And Tough Mountain Home MH 1502)

=== J.D. Crowe, Rickey Wasson ===
- 2018: Hats Off To Haggard (Truegrass Entertainment CDTGE90444)
- 2021: Crowe & Wasson (Truegrass Entertainment TG-9584-1)

=== As session musician ===
- 1963: Charlie Monroe – Bluegrass Sound (REM LP-1003, reissued in 1982 as: Songs He Made Famous by Old Homestead OHCS 304) (feat. J.D. Crowe (banjo), B. Joslin (fiddle), E. Stacy (bass)
- 1965: Charlie Monroe – Lord build me a cabin (REM RL 1010) (feat. J.D. Crowe (banjo), B. Lucas, Paul Mullins (fiddle), K. Whalen, B. Wassumm K. O. Durham, (guitar, T. Sharp (bass)).
- 1969: Joe Green – Joe Greene's Fiddle Album (County 722) (feat. J.D. Crowe (banjo), Roland White (mandolin), Chubby Wise (guitar), Benny Williams (bass))
- 1970: Dan & Louise Brock – Kentucky Songbag (Donerail 201) feat. J.D. Crowe (banjo), Doyle Lawson (guitar), Bobby Slone (fiddle)).
- 1974: Tony Rice – Freeborn Man (King Bluegrass KB 529) (J.D. Crowe, Larry Rice, Bobby Slone)
- 1975: Larry Rice – Mr. Poverty (King Bluegrass KB-543) (feat. J.D. Crowe (banjo), Tony Rice (guitar), Ricky Skaggs (fiddle), Jerry Douglas (Resonator Guitar), Bobby Slone (bass), producer : Tony Rice)
- 1977: Doyle Lawson – Tennessee Dream (County 766, reed.2002, Rebel CD-1778) (feat. J.D. Crowe (banjo), James Bailey (guitar, banjo), Kenny Baker (fiddle), Jerry Douglas (Resonator Guitar), Bobby Slone (bass))
- 1977: Tony Rice – Tony Rice (Rounder 0085)
- 1988: David Grisman – Home Is Where The Heart Is (Rounder CD0251/0252) (5 tracks, feat. J.D. Crowe (banjo), Tony Rice (guitar))
- 1991: Vassar Clements – Grass Routes (Rounder CD0287) (feat. J.D. Crowe (bjo), Jesse McReynolds (mando), Buddy Spicher(2° fiddle), David Grier (gtr), Roy Huskey Jr. (bass))
- 2000: Keith Whitley Sad Songs and Waltzes (Rounder CD 0399 included 6-tracks from – New South album: Somewhere Between, Rounder 0153) Produced by J.D. Crowe and Don Gant

Others sessions, among others, with: Red Allen, Ronnie Bowman, Sam Bush, Jerry Douglas, Jimmy Gaudreau, Richard Greene, Tom T. Hall, Michael Johnathon, Phil Leadbetter, Don Rigsby, Ricky Skaggs...

== Sources ==
- Godbey, Marty (2011). Crowe on the Banjo: The Music Life of J.D. Crowe. University of Illinois Press. ISBN 978-0-252-09353-1. OCLC 759907747.
