= Bobby Hicks =

- Born: Robert Caldwell Hicks; July 21, 1933; Newton, North Carolina, U.S.
- Died: August 16, 2024 (aged 91)
- Occupations: Fiddler, musician
- Instruments: Fiddle, banjo, acoustic guitar
- Years active: 1953–2024

Robert Caldwell Hicks (July 21, 1933 – August 16, 2024) was a Grammy Award-winning American bluegrass fiddler and musician with more than fifty years of experience. He was inducted into the International Bluegrass Music Hall of Fame in 2017.

== Life and career ==
Hicks was born in Newton, North Carolina, and learned to play the fiddle before he was 9 years old. He attended several fiddlers conventions and at the age of eleven, he won the North Carolina State Championship playing the tune "Black Mountain Rag". He joined Jim Eanes's band in the early 1950s.

In 1953, bluegrass festival organizer Carlton Haney introduced Hicks to Bill Monroe, who hired him as a bass player. He first recorded with the Bluegrass Boys on December 31, 1954, by which time he had switched to fiddle. During this period, he learned to play "Nashville swing" by the session fiddler Dale Potter, a style Hicks often used when playing with Bill Monroe on the road. Monroe dubbed Hicks "the truest fiddler he had ever heard". He recorded seven tunes with Monroe but left in 1956 to join the army. In 1958, after his discharge, he rejoined the Bluegrass Boys, recording ten more songs. He left in 1959 to join Porter Wagoner. Later in 1963, he moved to Las Vegas, Nevada and became a fixture on the Judy Lynn Show for the next seven years. In 1981, he joined Ricky Skaggs, a stint that would last for 23 years.

In the mid and late 1980s, he frequently performed with Bill Monroe on stage and on records. He was inducted into the Fiddlers Hall of Fame in 2002. He appeared as a member of Jesse McReynolds and the Virginia Boys in 2003. The next year, he performed with Hazel Creek.

In 2004, he celebrated 50 years at the Grand Ole Opry. Bobby Hicks is a 10 time Grammy winner and 7 time nominee. His discography includes over 10 albums as a leader or co-leader. In 2017, he was inducted into the Bluegrass Music Hall of Fame.

Hicks died from complications of heart disease on August 16, 2024, at the age of 91.
