= Todd Phillips (musician) =

American musician (born 1953)

- Born: April 21, 1953 (age 73); San Jose, California, United States
- Genres: Bluegrass, jazz
- Occupations: Musician, composer, producer
- Instruments: Bass, mandolin
- Label: Rounder Records
- Website: www.toddphillipsmusic.com

Todd Phillips (born April 21, 1953) is an American double bassist. He has appeared on a number of acoustic instrumental and bluegrass recordings made since the mid-1970s. A two-time Grammy Award winner and founding member of the original David Grisman Quintet, Phillips has made a career of performing and recording with acoustic music artists.

== Career ==
Along with Tony Rice and Darol Anger, Phillips was a founding member of the original David Grisman Quintet. He spent five years playing rhythm mandolin and bass with the group. He then spent another five years with Rice in The Tony Rice Unit. Rice and Phillips also worked together with J. D. Crowe, Doyle Lawson, Bobby Hicks and Jerry Douglas in the now classic bluegrass recording group, the Bluegrass Album Band, producing six albums over fifteen years. Since then, Phillips has had the opportunity to work with a virtual "who's who" of acoustic music's finest, including Vassar Clements, Ricky Skaggs, Sam Bush, Stephane Grapelli, Taj Mahal, John Hartford, Jerry Douglas, Alison Brown, Mike Marshall, Stuart Duncan, Tim O'Brien, Bryan Sutton, Chris Thile, Del McCoury, Natalie McMaster, Darrell Scott, and Larry Campbell.

In 1983 Phillips received his first Grammy Award for his work with The New South (Crowe, Skaggs, Rice, and Douglas) in a live concert recording, Bluegrass – The Greatest Show on Earth. That year, he also finished his critically acclaimed first solo recording, Released (Varrick Records), featuring Tony Rice and Darol Anger. Throughout the 1980s, Frets Magazine readers chose Phillips in five Readers Poll Awards for "best jazz" and "best bluegrass bassist".

Phillips has recorded much since then as producer, engineer and artist. In 1993 he produced Kathy Kallick's Matters of the Heart, and in 1995 he released his traditional "old-time" bluegrass instrumental CD, In the Pines (Gourd Music), and another CD of all-original, jazz-influenced compositions Timeframe (with Paul McCandless, Compass Records). Phillips' second Grammy Award came in 1997 as producer of True Life Blues – The Songs of Bill Monroe. The album received three Grammy nominations and won Bluegrass Album of the Year. The project also received two IBMA Awards (International Bluegrass Music Association).

Throughout the 1990s Phillips toured and recorded with PsychoGrass (Anger, Marshall, Grier, Trischka, Phillips), The Laurie Lewis Band, NewGrange (O'Brien, Anger, Marshall, Brown, Aaberg, Phillips), The Tim O'Brien Band w/Darrel Scott, and Phillips, Grier & Flinner, among others.

Phillips has produced recordings for guitar great David Grier (Panorama), and two projects for mandolinist Matt Flinner (The View From Here and Latitude), which led to the formation of the innovative instrumental trio Phillips, Grier & Flinner, and their two highly acclaimed CDs, Phillips, Grier & Flinner, released in 1999, and Looking Back, released in 2002 (Compass Records). These two CDs are unique in the world of bluegrass or jazz-based instrumental music, successfully featuring only acoustic guitar, bass and mandolin as the complete ensemble.

Phillips has taught at several music camps, and in 2001 he completed an instructional video/DVD series for Homespun Tapes, Essential Techniques for Acoustic Bass, I&II.

Recently he has produced and engineered projects at his home studio, including for Noam Pikelny, Bearfoot Bluegrass, and PsychoGrass. He mixed (and played on) the latest Laurie Lewis Band CD, The Golden West. Phillips' most recent effort is a tribute recording project for Rounder Records, featuring the songs of Hazel Dickens performed by a host of legendary artists including Joan Osborne, Linda Ronstadt, and Emmylou Harris. In November 2006 he appeared on the Late Show with David Letterman with Elvis Costello and Rosanne Cash during a trip to New York to record them both for the Dickens tribute project.

He currently tours with Phillips, Grier & Flinner; PsychoGrass; and Laurie Lewis. Along with John Doyle and Dirk Powell he forms the band for Joan Baez.
