= Tony Rice =

American bluegrass musician (1951–2020)

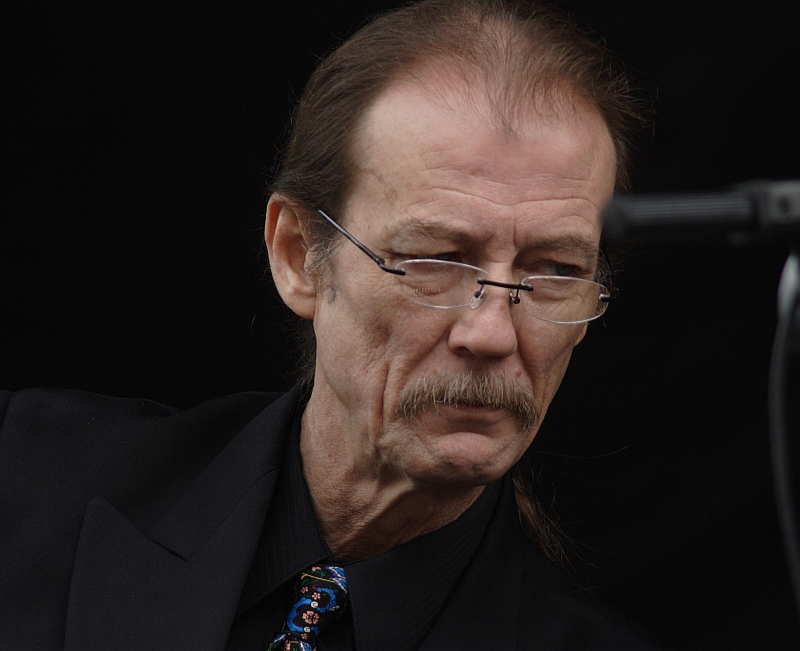
- Rice in 2006

Background information
- Born: David Anthony Rice; June 8, 1951; Danville, Virginia, U.S.
- Origin: Los Angeles, California, U.S.
- Died: December 25, 2020 (aged 69) Reidsville, North Carolina, U.S.
- Genres: Americana; bluegrass; folk; jazz
- Occupations: Musician; songwriter
- Instrument: Guitar
- Years active: 1970–2013
- Labels: Rounder; Sugar Hill; Acoustic Disc; Mountain Home
- Formerly of: The David Grisman Quintet; Bluegrass Album Band
- Relatives: Larry Rice (brother); Wyatt Rice (brother)

David Anthony Rice (June 8, 1951 – December 25, 2020) was an American bluegrass guitarist and singer. He was an influential acoustic guitar player in bluegrass, progressive bluegrass, newgrass and acoustic jazz. He was inducted into the International Bluegrass Music Hall of Fame in 2013.

Rice's music spans the range of acoustic music from traditional bluegrass to jazz influenced, New Acoustic music to songwriter-oriented folk. Over the course of his career, he played alongside J. D. Crowe and the New South, David Grisman (during the formation of Dawg Music) and Jerry Garcia, led his own band, the Tony Rice Unit, collaborated with Norman Blake, recorded with his brothers Wyatt, Ron, and Larry, and co-founded the Bluegrass Album Band. Over the course of his career, he recorded with drums, piano and soprano sax as well as with traditional bluegrass instruments.

== Early years ==
Rice was born in Danville, Virginia, Growing up, he had somewhat of a nomadic childhood. In search of work, his family moved around a lot living in several states, including Florida, Georgia, Texas, and North Carolina. They settled in Los Angeles, California, where his father, Herb Rice, introduced him to bluegrass music. Herb was a mandolin player and taught each of his four sons how to play. Tony and Wyatt were taught guitar, Larry the mandolin, and Ronnie the upright bass. Rice and his brothers learned the fundamentals of bluegrass and country music from L.A. musicians like the Kentucky Colonels, led by Roland and Clarence White. When the Rice family moved to California, Herb joined the Golden State Boys, which was a group inspired by the Kentucky Colonels. In 1960, when Rice was nine years old, he met Clarence White, his all-time favorite guitarist, at a show. Rice was so enamored that White allowed him to try out his 1935 D-28 Martin. This guitar was famous for having an enlarged sound hole. Rice never forgot this moment. So much so that in 1975, Rice purchased this guitar. This guitar “became iconic in his hands” and became famously known by its serial number, 58957. Clarence White's guitar playing in particular was a huge influence on Rice, adding elements beyond those of Doc Watson's adventurous, fiddle influenced style. Crossing paths with fellow enthusiasts like Ry Cooder, Herb Pedersen and Chris Hillman reinforced the strength of the music he had learned from his father.

In 1971, Rice met Kate Freeman, whom he married in a Lexington church a year later. The couple moved to California when Rice joined David Grisman in creating Grisman's Dawg, a newly imagined form of acoustic music. Rice and Kate ended things in 1979. Tony later married Pam Rice with whom he remained until his death in 2020.

== Groups ==
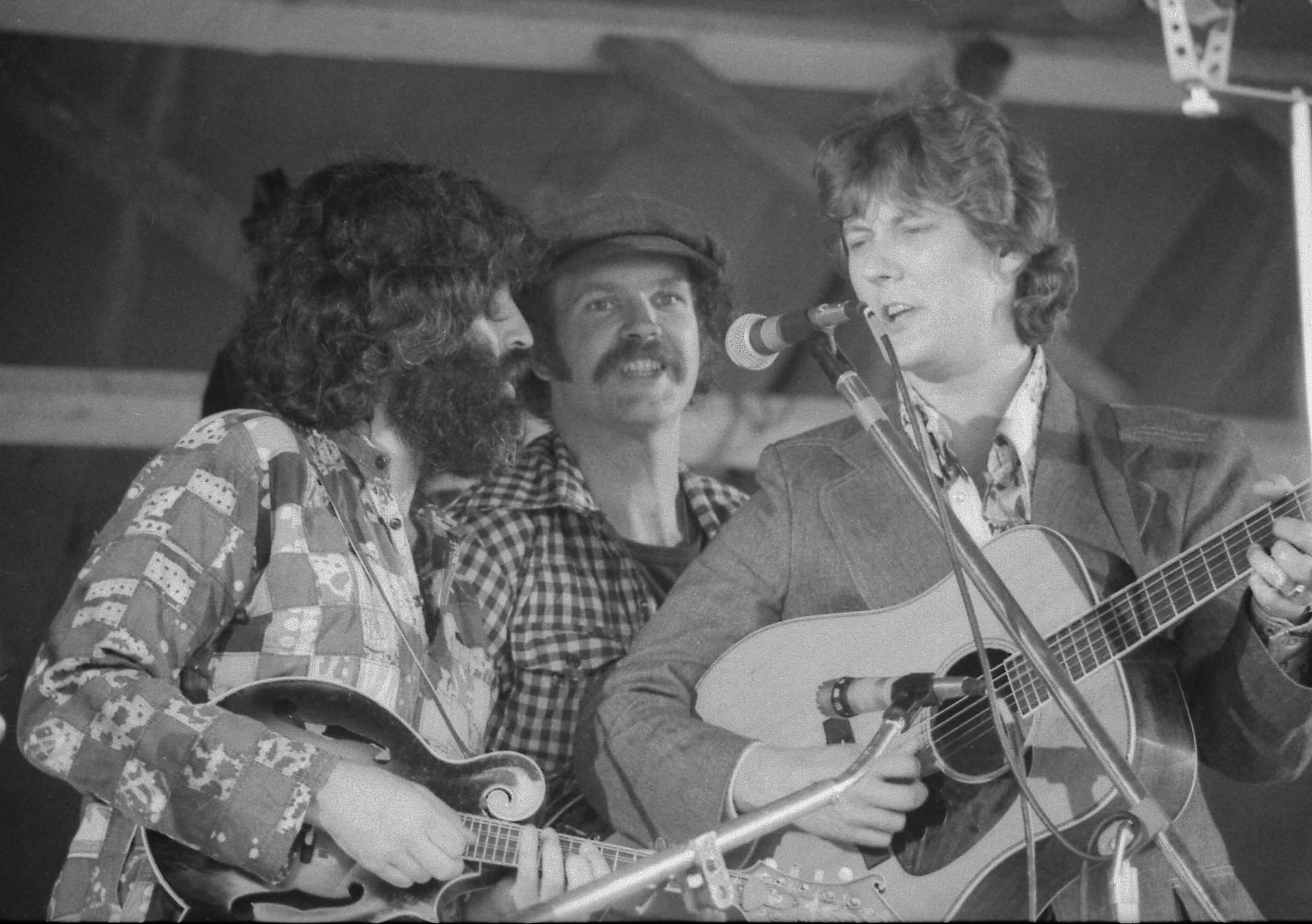
Rice with David Grisman (mandolin) and Bill Keith (banjo) at the Courville sur Eure Folk festival, France in 1977

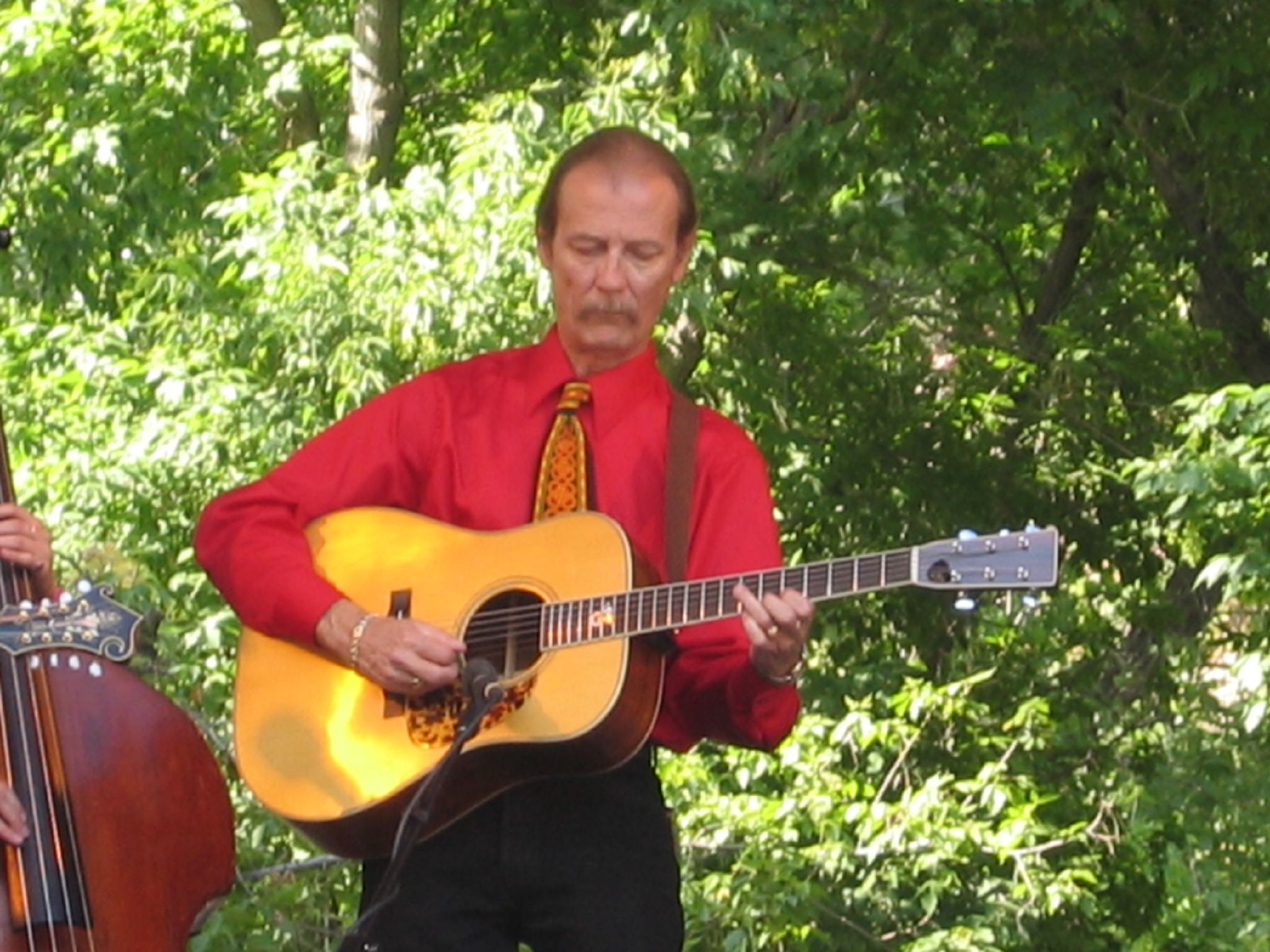
Rice at RockyGrass 2005

Mandolinist and fiddler Sam Bush tells the story about first hearing Rice in 1970 at a campfire at Carlton Haney's bluegrass festival in Reidsville, North Carolina. Bush, who at the time was playing guitar in the Bluegrass Alliance after Dan Crary left, brought Rice to the group.

That year, Rice moved to Louisville, Kentucky, playing with the Bluegrass Alliance and shortly thereafter with J.D. Crowe's New South. The New South was known as one of the best and most progressive bluegrass groups, eventually adding drums and electric instruments to Rice's displeasure. When Ricky Skaggs joined them in 1974, however, the band recorded J. D. Crowe & the New South, an acoustic album that became Rounder Records' top seller up to that time. At that point, the group was Rice on guitar and lead vocals, J.D. on banjo and vocals, Jerry Douglas on Dobro, Skaggs on fiddle, mandolin, and tenor vocals, and Bobby Slone on bass and fiddle.

Around this time, Rice met mandolinist David Grisman while recording for Bill Keith's first album with Rounder Records called Something Auld, Something Newgrass, Something Borrowed, Something Bluegrass. Grisman played with Red Allen and the Kentuckians during the 1960s after Frank Wakefield left and who was now working on original material that blended jazz, bluegrass, and classical music. Rice left the New South and moved to California to join Grisman's all-instrumental group, the David Grisman Quintet. In order to broaden his expertise and make himself more marketable, Rice studied chord theory, learned to read charts, and began to expand his playing beyond bluegrass. Guitarist John Carlini came in to teach Rice music theory, and Carlini helped him learn the intricacies of jazz playing and musical improvisation in general. The David Grisman Quintet's 1977 debut recording is considered a landmark of acoustic string band music.

In 1980, Rice, Crowe, fiddler Bobby Hicks, mandolinist Doyle Lawson and bassist Todd Phillips formed the Bluegrass Album Band and recorded several successful albums for Rounder Records from 1980 to 1996.

Following that with the Tony Rice Unit, he pursued experimental "spacegrass" music on the Mar West, Still Inside, and Backwaters albums. Members of the Unit included Jimmy Gaudreau (mandolin), Wyatt Rice (guitar), Ronnie Simpkins (bass), John Reischman (mandolin), and Rickie Simpkins (fiddle). In the late 1980s, Alison Krauss regularly played with the group in concert for about a year though she never recorded with them. Alison Brown also guested with the group during that time.

== Collaborations ==
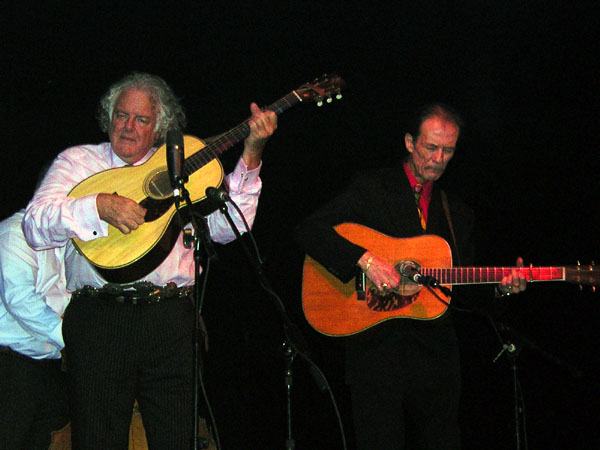
Rice (right) performing with Peter Rowan at the Kent Stage in Kent, Ohio in 2008

In 1980, he recorded a successful album of traditional old-time duets with Ricky Skaggs called Skaggs & Rice. He followed that with two albums alongside traditional instrumentalist and songwriter Norman Blake both well received and two Rice Brothers albums (1992 and 1994) that featured him teamed with his late elder brother, Larry, and younger brothers, Wyatt and Ronnie.

Beginning in 1984, Rice collaborated on four albums with bluegrass banjo player Béla Fleck – Double Time (1984), Drive (1988), Tales from the Acoustic Planet (1995), and The Bluegrass Sessions: Tales from the Acoustic Planet, Vol. 2 (1999).

Rice joined David Grisman and Jerry Garcia in 1993 to record The Pizza Tapes. In 1994, Rice and Grisman recorded Tone Poems, an original collection of material where they used historical, vintage mandolins and guitars, different ones for each track.

In 1994, Rice joined Mark Johnson to record Clawgrass, Mark Johnson with the Rice Brothers and Friends which featured Tony and his brothers Larry Rice, Wyatt and Ronnie.

In 1995, Rice recorded a duo album with John Carlini who also played with the David Grisman Quintet.

In 1997, Rice, his brother Larry, Chris Hillman (formerly of the Flying Burrito Brothers and the Byrds) and banjoist Herb Pedersen founded the so-called anti-supergroup Rice, Rice, Hillman & Pedersen and produced three albums between 1997 and 2001.

In the 2000s and 2010s, he performed in a quartet with guitarist/singer-songwriter Peter Rowan, bassist Bryn Bright (later known as Bryn Davies), and mandolinist Billy Bright (replaced by Sharon Gilchrist).

== Solo career ==
In 1979, Rice left Grisman's group to record Acoustics, a jazz inspired album followed by Manzanita, a bluegrass and folk album. On albums that followed, Church Street Blues, Cold on the Shoulder, Me & My Guitar, and Native American, he combined bluegrass, jazzy guitar work and the songwriting of Ian Tyson, Joni Mitchell, Phil Ochs, Tom Paxton, Bob Dylan, Gordon Lightfoot and Mary Chapin Carpenter.

Rice's singing voice was a rich, distinctive baritone. In 1994, he was diagnosed with a disorder known as muscle tension dysphonia and as a result was forced to stop singing in live performance. A 2014 diagnosis of lateral epicondylitis ("tennis elbow") made guitar playing painful and his last performance playing guitar live was when he was inducted into the International Bluegrass Music Hall of Fame in 2013. In 2015, he said "I am not going to go back out into the public eye until I can be the musician that I was, where I left off or better. I have been blessed with a very devout audience all these years and I am certainly not going to let anybody down. I am not going to risk going out there and performing in front of people again until I can entertain them in a way that takes away from them the rigors and the dust, the bumps in the road of everyday life."

The authorized biography of Tony Rice, called Still Inside: The Tony Rice Story, written by Tim Stafford and Hawaii-based journalist Caroline Wright, was published by Word of Mouth Press in Kingsport, Tennessee, United States in 2010. The book's official release was at Merlefest in North Carolina that year.

== Death ==
Rice died at his home in Reidsville, North Carolina, on December 25, 2020, at age 69.

== Influence ==
Tony Rice "redefined bluegrass guitar playing and left a lasting imprint on the genre." David Grisman called Rice "a complete musician of the highest caliber" and Ricky Skaggs said he was "the single most influential acoustic guitar player in the last 50 years."

Although Rice's guitar playing was colorful and recognizable, flash was not his aim. His rhythm playing was driving and clear, while his solos were strategic and melodic. Rice stepped outside of what any other guitarist was doing at the time. Doing this, he raised the bar of what a bluegrass guitar player could do. Tony Rice was one of the most influential bluegrass guitar players of all time.

In a lesson exploring Rice's style, guitarist Molly Tuttle said "the beauty of Tony's playing is that there's something for everyone to learn from. I've been playing guitar for a long time and I still go back to this and just want to listen to him strum the guitar." Rice was a big influence on the bluegrass band Punch Brothers who devoted their album Hell on Church Street as a tribute to Rice and to his 1983 album Church Street Blues. Members of the Punch Brothers band said that Rice's earlier albums had a huge impact on their music. In addition, guitarist Chris Eldridge was a student of Rice's. The group had intended that their album be a surprise gift to Rice but he died before they could finish it.

== Awards ==
=== Grammy ===
- Best Country Instrumental Performance: The New South, Fireball (1983)

=== IBMA ===
- Instrumental Group of the Year: Bluegrass Album Band (1990)
- Instrumental Performer of the Year, Guitar (1990, 1991, 1994, 1996, 1997, 2007)
- Instrumental Group of the Year: The Tony Rice Unit (1991, 1995)
- Instrumental Album of the Year: Bluegrass Instrumentals, Volume 6 (Rounder); Bluegrass Album Band (1997)
- Hall of Fame Inductee, 2013
