= Ricky Skaggs discography =

Cataloging of published recordings by Ricky Skaggs

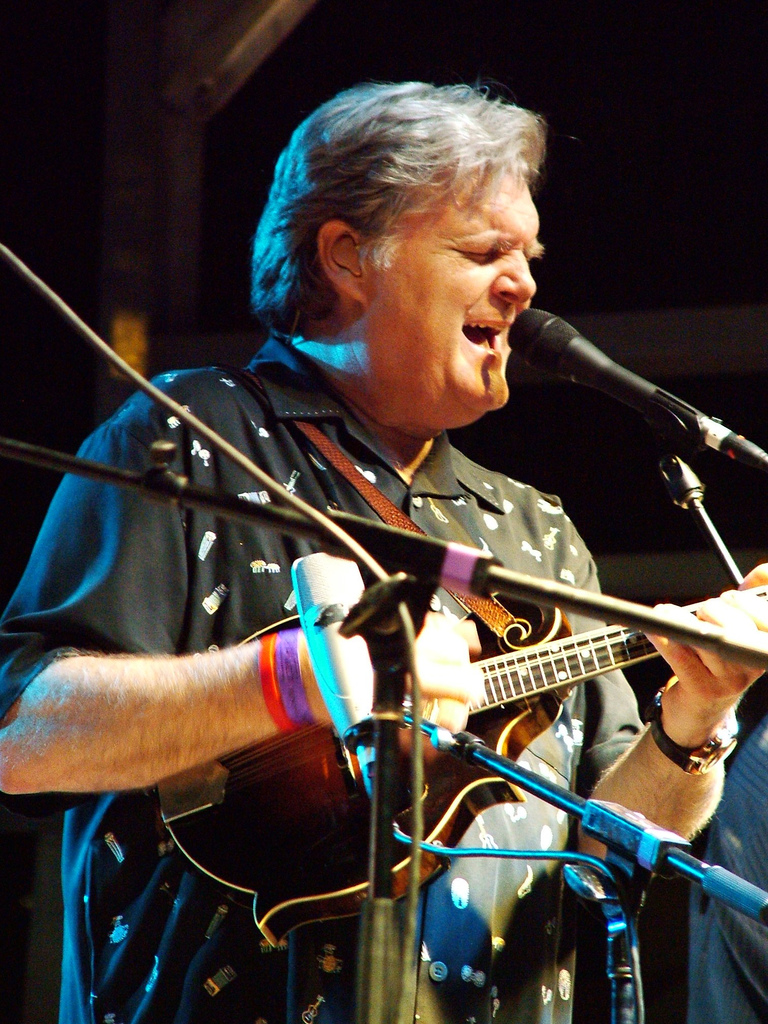
- Ricky Skaggs in 2007
- Studio albums: 32
- Live albums: 3
- Compilation albums: 1
- Singles: 42
- Music videos: 16
- No.1 Single: 11

Ricky Skaggs is an American country music and bluegrass singer, musician, producer and composer. He primarily plays mandolin; however, he also plays fiddle, guitar, mandocaster and banjo.

== Studio albums ==
=== 1970s–1980s ===
Title	Album details	Peak chart positions				Certifications (sales thresholds)
Title	Album details	US Country	US	CAN Country	CAN	Certifications (sales thresholds)
That's It!	Release date: 1975; Label: Rebel Records	—	—	—	—	
Sweet Temptation	Release date: 1979; Label: Sugar Hill Records	—	—	—	—	
Waitin' for the Sun to Shine	Release date: May 1981; Label: Sugar Hill/Epic Records	2	77	—	—	US: Gold; CAN: Platinum
Family & Friends	Release date: June 1982; Label: Rounder Records	52	—	—	—	
Highways & Heartaches	Release date: September 1982; Label: Sugar Hill/Epic Records	1	61	—	—	US: Platinum; CAN: Platinum
Don't Cheat in Our Hometown	Release date: October 1983; Label: Sugar Hill/Epic Records	1	—	1	87	US: Gold; CAN: Platinum
Country Boy	Release date: October 1984; Label: Epic Records	1	180	—	—	US: Gold; CAN: Gold
Love's Gonna Get Ya!	Release date: October 1986; Label: Epic Records	3	—	—	—	
Comin' Home to Stay	Release date: March 28, 1988; Label: Epic Records	12	—	—	—	
Kentucky Thunder	Release date: May 26, 1989; Label: Epic Records	18	—	27	—	
"—" denotes releases that did not chart

=== 1990s–2010s ===
Title	Album details	Peak chart positions		
Title	Album details	US Country	US Grass	US Indie
My Father's Son	Release date: September 10, 1991; Label: Epic Records	68	—	—
Solid Ground^{[A]}	Release date: November 7, 1995; Label: Atlantic Records	72	—	—
Life Is a Journey	Release date: July 29, 1997; Label: Atlantic Records	—	—	—
Solo (Songs My Dad Loved)	Release date: September 15, 2009; Label: Skaggs Family	39	1	46
Mosaic	Release date: August 24, 2010; Label: Skaggs Family	50	—	—
Country Hits Bluegrass Style	Release date: July 19, 2011; Label: Skaggs Family	51	3	—
"—" denotes releases that did not chart

== Collaborative albums ==
Title	Album details	Artist	Peak chart positions			
Title	Album details	Artist	US Country	US	US Grass	US Indie
Second Generation Bluegrass	Release date: 1971; Label: Rebel Records	Keith Whitley	—	—	—	—
That Down Home Feeling	Release date: 1977; Label: Ridge Runner Records	Buck White & The Down Home Folks	—	—	—	—
One Way Track	Release date: 1978; Label: Sugar Hill Records	Boone Creek	—	—	—	—
Skaggs & Rice	Release date: 1980; Label: Sugar Hill Records	Tony Rice	—	—	—	—
Bluegrass Rules!	Release date: October 21, 1997; Label: Rounder Records	Kentucky Thunder	45	—	—	—
Ancient Tones	Release date: January 26, 1999; Label: Skaggs Family	Kentucky Thunder	46	—	—	—
Soldier of the Cross	Release date: September 14, 1999; Label: Skaggs Family	Kentucky Thunder	65	—	—	—
Big Mon: The Songs of Bill Monroe	Release date: August 29, 2000; Label: Skaggs Family	Various Artists	42	—	—	34
History of the Future	Release date: September 11, 2001; Label: Skaggs Family	Kentucky Thunder	35	—	10	—
Ricky Skaggs and Friends Sing the Songs of Bill Monroe	Release date: February 26, 2002; Label: Lyric Street Records	Various Artists	36	—	11	—
The Three Pickers	Release date: July 15, 2003; Label: Rounder Records	Earl Scruggs and Doc Watson	24	179	2	—
Brand New Strings	Release date: September 28, 2004; Label: Skaggs Family	Kentucky Thunder	60	—	1	—
Instrumentals	Release date: August 1, 2006; Label: Skaggs Family	Kentucky Thunder	73	—	1	—
Ricky Skaggs & Bruce Hornsby	Release date: March 20, 2007; Label: Legacy Recordings	Bruce Hornsby	37	—	1	—
Salt of the Earth	Release date: September 25, 2007; Label: Skaggs Family	The Whites	45	—	1	47
Honoring the Fathers of Bluegrass: Tribute to 1946 and 1947	Release date: March 25, 2008; Label: Skaggs Family	Kentucky Thunder	29	191	1	26
Music to My Ears	Release date: September 25, 2012; Label: Skaggs Family	Kentucky Thunder	52	—	2	—
Hearts Like Ours	Release date: September 30, 2014; Label: Skaggs Family	Sharon White	—	—	—	—
"—" denotes releases that did not chart

== Christmas albums ==
Title	Album details	Peak positions
Title	Album details	US Grass
A Skaggs Family Christmas: Volume One	Release date: October 18, 2005; Label: Skaggs Family	—
A Skaggs Family Christmas: Volume Two	Release date: September 27, 2011; Label: Skaggs Family	3
"—" denotes releases that did not chart

== Live albums ==
Title	Album details	Peak chart positions		Certifications (sales thresholds)
Title	Album details	US Country	US Grass	Certifications (sales thresholds)
Live in London	Release date: October 1985; Label: Epic Records	1	—	US: Gold
Live at the Charleston Music Hall (with Kentucky Thunder)	Release date: March 25, 2003; Label: Skaggs Family	32	2	
Cluck Ol' Hen (with Bruce Hornsby)	Release date: August 20, 2013; Label: Skaggs Family	38	1	
"—" denotes releases that did not chart

== Compilation albums ==
Title	Album details	Peak chart positions	
Title	Album details	US Country	US
Favorite Country Songs	Release date: February 1985; Label: Epic Records	24	181
Personal Choice	Release date: 1987; Label: Epic Records	—	—
Super Hits	Release date: August 31, 1993; Label: Epic Records	—	—
Country Pride	Release date: April 12, 1995; Label: Sony Music Special Products	—	—
Country Gentleman: The Best of Ricky Skaggs^{[B]}	Release date: January 27, 1998; Label: Epic Records	—	—
16 Biggest Hits	Release date: September 16, 2000; Label: Epic Records	—	—
The Essential Ricky Skaggs	Release date: April 1, 2003; Label: Epic Records	—	—
"—" denotes releases that did not chart

== Singles ==
=== 1970s–1980s ===
Year	Single	Peak chart positions		Album
Year	Single	US Country	CAN Country	Album
1979	"I'll Take the Blame"	86	—	Sweet Temptation
1981	"Don't Get Above Your Raisin'"	16	47	Waitin' for the Sun to Shine
1981	"You May See Me Walkin'"	9	16	Waitin' for the Sun to Shine
1981	"Crying My Heart Out Over You"	1	3	Waitin' for the Sun to Shine
1982	"I Don't Care"	1	2	Waitin' for the Sun to Shine
1982	"Heartbroke"	1	1	Highways and Heartaches
1982	"I Wouldn't Change You If I Could"	1	1	Highways and Heartaches
1983	"Highway 40 Blues"	1	1	Highways and Heartaches
1983	"You've Got a Lover"	2	1	Highways and Heartaches
1983	"Don't Cheat in Our Hometown"	1	1	Don't Cheat in Our Hometown
1984	"Honey (Open That Door)"	1	1	Don't Cheat in Our Hometown
1984	"Uncle Pen"	1	1	Don't Cheat in Our Hometown
1984	"Something in My Heart"	2	1	Country Boy
1985	"Country Boy"	1	1	Country Boy
1985	"You Make Me Feel Like a Man"	7	8	Live in London
1986	"Cajun Moon"	1	1	Live in London
1986	"I've Got a New Heartache"	10	7	Live in London
1986	"Love's Gonna Get You Someday"	4	1	Love's Gonna Get Ya!
1987	"I Wonder If I Care as Much"	30	21	Love's Gonna Get Ya!
1987	"Love Can't Ever Get Better Than This" (with Sharon White)	10	7	Love's Gonna Get Ya!
1987	"I'm Tired"	18	6	Comin' Home to Stay
1988	"(Angel on My Mind) That's Why I'm Walkin'"	33	30	Comin' Home to Stay
1988	"Thanks Again"	17	10	Comin' Home to Stay
1988	"Old Kind of Love"	30	*	Comin' Home to Stay
1989	"Lovin' Only Me"	1	1	Kentucky Thunder
1989	"Let It Be You"	5	3	Kentucky Thunder
1989	"Heartbreak Hurricane"	13	5	Kentucky Thunder
* denotes unknown peak positions

=== 1990s–2010s ===
Year	Single	Peak chart positions		Album
Year	Single	US Country	CAN Country	Album
1990	"Hummingbird"	20	15	Kentucky Thunder
1990	"He Was On to Somethin' (So He Made You)"	25	6	Kentucky Thunder
1991	"Life's Too Long (To Live Like This)"	37	15	My Father's Son
1991	"Same Ol' Love"	12	23	My Father's Son
1992	"From the Word Love"	43	58	My Father's Son
1995	"Solid Ground"	57	56	Solid Ground
1996	"Back Where We Belong"	—	—	Solid Ground
1996	"Cat's in the Cradle"	45	44	Solid Ground
1996	"When"	—	—	Solid Ground
2002	"Halfway Home Cafe"	56	—	History of the Future
2003	"A Simple Life"	—	—	Live at the Charleston Music Hall
2004	"Spread a Little Love Around"	—	—	Brand New Strings
2005	"Enjoy the Ride"	—	—	Brand New Strings
2010	"Someday Soon"	—	—	Mosaic
2014	"Forever's Not Long Enough" (with Sharon White)	—	—	Hearts Like Ours
"—" denotes releases that did not chart

== Other singles ==
=== Guest singles ===
Year	Single	Artist	Peak chart positions			Album
Year	Single	Artist	US Country	CAN Country	CAN	Album
1991	"Restless"	Mark O'Connor (with Vince Gill and Steve Wariner)	25	19	—	The New Nashville Cats
1998	"Same Old Train"	Various Artists	59	—	—	Tribute to Tradition
2014	"Make You Mine"	High Valley	—	5	58	County Line
"—" denotes releases that did not chart

== Music videos ==
Year	Title	Director
1981	"Don't Get Above Your Raisin'"	
1982	"Heartbroke"	
1984	"Honey (Open That Door)"	Martin Kahan
1985	"Country Boy" (with Bill Monroe)	Martin Kahan
1985	"You Make Me Feel Like a Man"	
1986	"Cajun Moon"	
1986	"New Star Shining" (with James Taylor)	Jon Small
1989	"Let It Be You"	Jack Cole
1991	"Restless" (with Mark O'Connor, Vince Gill, and Steve Wariner)	
1991	"Life's Too Long (To Live Like This)"	Doug Freel
1992	"Same Ol' Love"	Steve Gebhardt
1992	"From the Word Love"	Wayne Miller
1994	"The Mind of Christ"	Stan Strickland
1995	"Solid Ground"	John Lloyd Miller
1996	"Step of Faith" (with Carman)	Steve Yake
1996	"Cat's in the Cradle"	Daniel Pearl/Ricky Skaggs/Stan Strickland
1998	"Same Old Train" (Various Artists)	Steve Boyle
2005	"Love Came Gently"	Marie Najame
2008	"Old Enough" (with The Raconteurs and Ashley Monroe)	Autumn de Wilde
2011	"Somebody's Prayin'	

== Notes ==
- A Solid Ground also peaked at number 11 on the RPM Country Albums chart in Canada.
- B Country Gentleman: The Best of Ricky Skaggs was re-released as The Essential Ricky Skaggs on March 15, 2011 via Legacy Recordings.
