= Balsam Range =

American bluegrass band

- Origin: Haywood County, North Carolina, US
- Genres: Bluegrass, acoustic
- Years active: 2007–present
- Members: Tim Surrett; Caleb Smith; Marc Pruett; Alan Bibey
- Past members: Buddy Melton; Darren Nicholson
- Website: balsamrange.com

Balsam Range is an American bluegrass and acoustic music group founded in 2007 in Haywood County, North Carolina. They are 2014 and 2018 International Bluegrass Music Association (IMBA) Entertainer of the Year award recipients. Their other accolades include IBMA Vocal Group of the Year (2014, 2015), Song of the Year (2011, 2015), and Album of the Year (2013, 2017). Balsam Range consists of three original members—Tim Surrett on upright bass, resonator guitar, and vocals; Caleb Smith on guitar and vocals; and Marc Pruett on banjo, as well as Alan Bibey on mandolin, who replaced Darren Nicholson in 2022. Lead singer and original member Buddy Melton, fiddle and lead vocals, also departed the band, in January 2025.

== History ==
=== Founding and early years ===
Balsam Range was formed in 2007. "In the beginning, we just got together, five guys from the same county that just wanted to play music together just for the fun of it," said Buddy Melton in a 2018 interview. "We were just living in the same town and happened to be great friends, so it was an ideal scenario." Melton and Pruett had performed together as members of Whitewater Bluegrass Company, and band members had recorded on solo efforts by Melton, Nicholson, and Surrett. Inspiration for a band name came from the Great Balsam Range, which surrounds their home county. "We thought it was a little pretentious to have 'great' in there, so we just stripped that off of it and called us Balsam Range," Melton says. From their initial recording sessions came Marching Home, the band's debut album, released in October 2007. It included guest appearances by Joe Diffie, Doyle Lawson, Jim Van Cleve, Tony Rice, and Jerry Salley, and featured "Blue Mountain", which remains the band's most-requested song.

== Albums and achievements ==
Balsam Range followed Marching Home with Last Train to Kitty Hawk in 2009, with the title song hitting number one on Bluegrass Unlimited's National Bluegrass Survey in September of that year."Trains I Missed", the title song of their third album, earned Balsam Range their first IBMA award, Song of the Year, in 2011.

Named for their hometown of Canton, North Carolina, which houses a paper mill, their next album, Papertown, spent five consecutive months at the number-one spot on the Bluegrass Unlimited National Bluegrass Survey chart. The project garnered seven IBMA nominations for Balsam Range in 2013, and they walked away with the Album of the Year honor.

Since 2012, the band has frequently collaborated with John Driskell Hopkins, founding member of the Zac Brown Band. Hopkins heard Balsam Range on bluegrass radio in 2011 and was so impressed, he immediately bought all their music. After making an immediate personal and musical connection upon meeting, they decided to join forces and record an album. The result, Daylight, was released in January 2013. Balsam Range recorded and released a limited-run live album, Live at the Altamont, that same year. The recording was made available only for members of Balsam Nation, the group's fan club.

The 2014 album Five garnered another accolade for the band. Its leadoff single, "Moon Over Memphis", was named Song of the Year at the 2015 IBMA awards, where the group also took home the Vocal Group of the Year trophy. Balsam Range's next album, Mountain Voodoo, released in 2016, was named Album of the Year at the 2017 IBMA awards.

Through their work with Hopkins, the band became acquainted with the Atlanta Pops Orchestra, which provided accompaniment for Balsam Range's next two albums: It's Christmas Time, a 2017 holiday EP, and Mountain Overture, a complete album featuring new versions of Balsam Range's best-loved songs.

Aeonic, released on January 4, 2019, debuted at number one on the Billboard Bluegrass Chart. The album remained on the chart for five consecutive weeks and appeared on Billboard's Heatseekers Chart, Americana/Folk Chart, and Current Country Chart. Aeonic was featured in the Wall Street Journal, Rolling Stone Country, Billboard, and other publications. Also in 2019, Balsam Range released The Gospel Collection, a compilation of gospel recordings from past projects. In 2021, they issued their latest record, Moxie and Mettle.

=== Art of Music Festival ===
In December 2016, the band introduced the Balsam Range Art of Music Festival, a two-day event held at Lake Junaluska, North Carolina, in the group's home county. The festival, created with the goal of inviting Balsam Range fans from all over the world to visit their home of western North Carolina, now generates upwards of $400,000 per year in revenue for Haywood County. The event has featured performances by Hopkins, the Atlanta Pops Orchestra, Darrell Scott, Shenandoah, Chloe Agnew, and many more.

== Band members ==
Current

- Tim Surrett (bass, dobro) has been a member of the gospel group the Kingsmen Quartet from 1988 until 1996, and again between 2002 and 2005. In 2014, he won the Mentor of the Year award at the IBMAs for his inspiration and work with young artists.
- Caleb Smith (guitar, vocals) is a luthier who runs his own company, Smith Custom Guitars.
- Marc Pruett (banjo) has played on five albums with Ricky Skaggs, including his 1974 debut That's It! and the 1997 Grammy award winner Bluegrass Rules! His music was used for a dozen years in the outdoor drama Unto These Hills, in Cherokee, North Carolina. He was awarded an honorary doctorate from Western Carolina University in 2010, for his contributions to bluegrass music.
- Alan Bibey (mandolin, vocals) Bibey joined after Darren Nicholson left in late 2022. He is considered a mandolin virtuoso and has won two IBMA Mandolin Player of the Year awards as well as nine SPBGMA Mandolin of the Year awards.

Past

- Buddy Melton (fiddle, vocals) won Male Vocalist of the Year at the 2014 and 2018 International Bluegrass Music Awards. In January 2025, he announced his departure from Balsam Range to pursue other projects.
- Darren Nicholson (mandolin, vocals) has released four solo albums, including his 2006 self-titled debut, 2014's Things Left Undone (featuring John Driskell Hopkins and Rhonda Vincent, among others), 2018's Fret a Spell, and the 2023 EP Wanderer. Nicholson departed the band in November 2022 to pursue other musical endeavors.

== Discography ==
Albums

- Marching Home (2007)
- Last Train to Kitty Hawk (2009)
- Trains I Missed (2010)
- Papertown (2012)
- Daylight (with John Driskell Hopkins) (2012)
- Live at the Altamont (2013)
- Five (2014)
- Mountain Voodoo (2016)
- It's Christmas Time (2017)
- Mountain Overture (with the Atlanta Pops Orchestra) (2018)
- Aeonic (January 4, 2019)
- The Gospel Collection (2019)
- Moxie and Mettle (2021)

Singles

- "The Girl Who Invented the Wheel" (2018)
- "Hobo Blues" (2018)
- "Get Me Gone" (2018)
- "Richest Man" (2020)
- "Grit and Grace" (2020)
