= My Father's Son (album) =

Studio album by Ricky Skaggs
- Released: September 10, 1991
- Studios: Castle Recording Studios (Franklin, Tennessee); Money Pit Studios, Soundshop Studio A, and Treasure Isle Recorders (Nashville, Tennessee)
- Genre: Country
- Length: 48:29
- Label: Epic
- Producers: Brian Ahern (track 8) Mac McAnally (all tracks) Ricky Skaggs (all tracks)

Ricky Skaggs chronology
| Kentucky Thunder (1989) | My Father's Son (1991) | Solid Ground (1992) |

My Father's Son is the eleventh studio album by American country music artist Ricky Skaggs. It was released on September 10, 1991, via Epic Records. The albums includes the singles "Life's Too Long (To Live Like This)", "Same Ol' Love" and "From the Word Love".

== Track listing ==
| No. | Title | Writer(s) | Length |
|---|---|---|---|
| 1. | "Life's Too Long (To Live Like This)" | Lonnie Wilson, John Barlow Jarvis, Don Cook | 3:52 |
| 2. | "Only Daddy That'll Walk the Line" | Jimmy Bryant | 2:31 |
| 3. | "Same Ol' Love" | Chris Austin, Greg Barnhill | 3:52 |
| 4. | "From the Word Love" | Keith Sewell | 3:10 |
| 5. | "You Don't Count the Cost" | Tom Shapiro, Chris Waters, Bucky Jones | 3:00 |
| 6. | "My Father's Son" | Ricky Skaggs | 2:41 |
| 7. | "Simple Life" | Mac McAnally | 3:28 |
| 8. | "Hold On Tight (Let It Go)" | Paul Overstreet, Don Schlitz | 2:52 |
| 9. | "You Can't Take It with You When You Go" | Larry Cordle, Larry Shell, Bert Colwell | 2:55 |
| 10. | "Father Knows Best" | Mike Curtis, Lenny LeBlanc | 3:32 |
| 11. | "Give Us a Happy Home" | Wayland Patton, Michael White | 3:44 |
| 12. | "Somebody's Prayin'" | John G. Elliott | 4:33 |

== Personnel ==
Adapted from liner notes.

- Ricky Skaggs – vocals, backing vocals (1, 3–10), acoustic guitar solo (1), mandolin (1, 6, 8, 9), harmony vocals (2), electric guitar (2, 3), electric guitar solo (3), acoustic guitar (6, 11), banjo (6), Earthwood bass (6), fiddle (6)
- Barry Beckett – organ (1, 10)
- John Barlow Jarvis – acoustic piano (1, 3, 5, 8–10), keyboards (7)
- Steve Nathan – organ (2), keyboards (4)
- Mike Rojas – acoustic piano (2)
- John G. Elliott – acoustic piano (12), string arrangements (12)
- Brent Mason – electric guitar (1, 3, 4, 7–10)
- Mac McAnally – acoustic guitar (1–5, 7–10), electric guitar (3), backing vocals (3, 4, 6–8), keyboards (5)
- Keith Little – acoustic guitar (2)
- Keith Sewell – acoustic guitar (4), backing vocals (4)
- Steve Gibson – electric guitar (5)
- Brian Ahern – acoustic guitar (8)
- Terry Crisp – steel guitar (2, 5, 8, 10)
- Paul Franklin – steel guitar (3, 4)
- Jerry Douglas – dobro (7)
- Bela Fleck – banjo (7)
- Sam Bush – mandolin (7)
- David Hungate – bass (1, 3, 4, 7–10)
- Roy Huskey Jr. – slap bass (1–3, 9)
- Jason Sellers – bass (2)
- Leland Sklar – bass (5), electric bass (11)
- Larrie Londin – drums (1, 7, 10)
- Keith Edwards – drums (2)
- Eddie Bayers – drums (3–5, 8, 9)
- Tom Roady – percussion (4)
- Bobby Hicks – fiddle (2)
- Stuart Duncan – fiddle (7, 9)
- Bobby Taylor – oboe (12)
- The Nashville String Machine – strings (12)
- Pamela Sixfin – concertmaster (12)
- Waylon Jennings – vocals (2)
- Sharon White – vocals (8), backing vocals (8)
- Lenny LeBlanc – backing vocals (10)

== Production ==
- Mac McAnally – producer
- Ricky Skaggs – producer
- Brian Ahern – producer (8)
- Rob Feaster – engineer, mixing (1–5, 7, 8)
- Alan Schulman – engineer, mixing (6)
- Ed Seay – engineer, mixing (9–12)
- Mark Capps – assistant engineer
- John Dickson – assistant engineer
- Patrick Hutchinson – assistant engineer
- Brad Jones – assistant engineer
- Denny Purcell – mastering at Georgetown Masters (Nashville, Tennessee)
- Rosie Franklin – production secretary
- Bill Johnson – art direction
- Jodi Lynn Miller – design
- Rollow Welch – design
- Jim "Señor" McGuire – photography
- Earl Cox – hair
- Elizabeth Linneman – make-up
- Ricky Skaggs Enterprises – management

== Chart performance ==
| Chart (1991) | Peak position |
|---|---|
| US Top Country Albums (Billboard) | 68 |
