= Ricky Skaggs & Bruce Hornsby =

Studio album by Ricky Skaggs & Bruce Hornsby
- Released: March 20, 2007
- Studio: Bruce Hornsby's studio (Williamsburg, Virginia); Skaggs Place Studio (Hendersonville, Tennessee)
- Genre: Bluegrass, piano rock
- Length: 48:52
- Label: SonyBMG/Legacy
- Producer: Bruce Hornsby; Ricky Skaggs

Ricky Skaggs chronology
| Instrumentals (2006) | Ricky Skaggs & Bruce Hornsby (2007) | Salt of the Earth (2007) |

Bruce Hornsby chronology
| Intersections (1985–2005) (2006) | Ricky Skaggs & Bruce Hornsby (2007) | Camp Meeting (2007) |

Professional ratings
Review scores
| Source | Rating |
|---|---|
| Music Box | 3.5/5 stars |

Bruce Hornsby's ninth studio album, a collaboration with bluegrass legend Ricky Skaggs titled Ricky Skaggs & Bruce Hornsby, marks the debut release for the duo's new musical project. The album features reworkings of Hornsby originals as bluegrass tunes, as well as a number of traditional songs and a Skaggs original composition. Worthy of note is the cover of "Super Freak" (the Rick James song), here turned into a bluegrass version.

== Track listing ==
1. "The Dreaded Spoon" (Hornsby) - 3:02
2. "Gulf of Mexico Fishing Boat Blues" (Hornsby) - 3:36
3. "Across the Rocky Mountain" (Traditional) - 6:05; Arr: Skaggs
4. "Mandolin Rain" (Bruce Hornsby, John Hornsby) - 6:09
5. "Stubb" (Skaggs) - 4:39
6. "Come on Out" (Gordon Kennedy, Phil Madeira) - 3:26
7. "A Night on the Town" (Hornsby, Hornsby) - 5:14
8. "Sheep Shell Corn" (Traditional) - 2:26
9. "Hills of Mexico" (Traditional) - 3:50; Arr: Skaggs
10. "Crown of Jewels" (Hornsby) - 6:21
11. "Super Freak" (James Ambrose Johnson, Alonzo Miller) - 4:04

== Musicians ==
- Bruce Hornsby – vocals (1, 2, 4, 7–11), grand piano, Hammond B3 organ (4), harmony vocals (11)
- Ricky Skaggs – vocals (1, 3, 6, 9, 10), guitars (1, 2, 4, 6–11), mandolin (1, 5, 8 11), harmony vocals (2, 4, 11), guitar solo (3), clawhammer (3, 8), fiddle (3, 8), mandolin solo (4, 10), Danelectro (5, 6, 9), banjolin (5, 8), Jew's harp (5), triangle (5), lead mandolin (6), banjo (9)
- Jeff Taylor – accordion (5, 10)
- Cody Kilby – guitar solo (1, 5, 7, 11), guitars (2, 6, 8–10), banjo (4, 7, 10)
- Jim Mills – banjo (1, 8, 11)
- Jerry Douglas – dobro (2)
- Gordon Kennedy – guitars (6), resonator guitar (6)
- Mark Fain – bass
- Sonny Emory – drums (3, 6)
- Andy Leftwich – fiddle (1, 2, 5, 8, 10, 11), mandolin (2–4, 6, 7, 9, 10)
- Stuart Duncan – fiddle (4, 9)
- Paul Brewster – harmony vocals (6)
- John Anderson – vocal ad-libs (11)

== Production ==
- Bruce Hornsby – producer
- Ricky Skaggs – producer
- Lee Groitzch – recording, mixing
- Brent King – recording, mixing
- Wayne Pooley – additional recording
- Andrew Mendleson – mastering at Georgetown Masters (Nashville, Tennessee)
- Erick Anderson – CD design, photography
- Metropolitan Talent Management – management for Bruce Hornsby
- RS Entertainment, Inc. – management for Ricky Skaggs

== Chart performance ==
| Chart (2007) | Peak position |
|---|---|
| U.S. Billboard Top Bluegrass Albums | 1 |
| U.S. Billboard Top Country Albums | 37 |
