= Jeff Taylor (musical artist) =

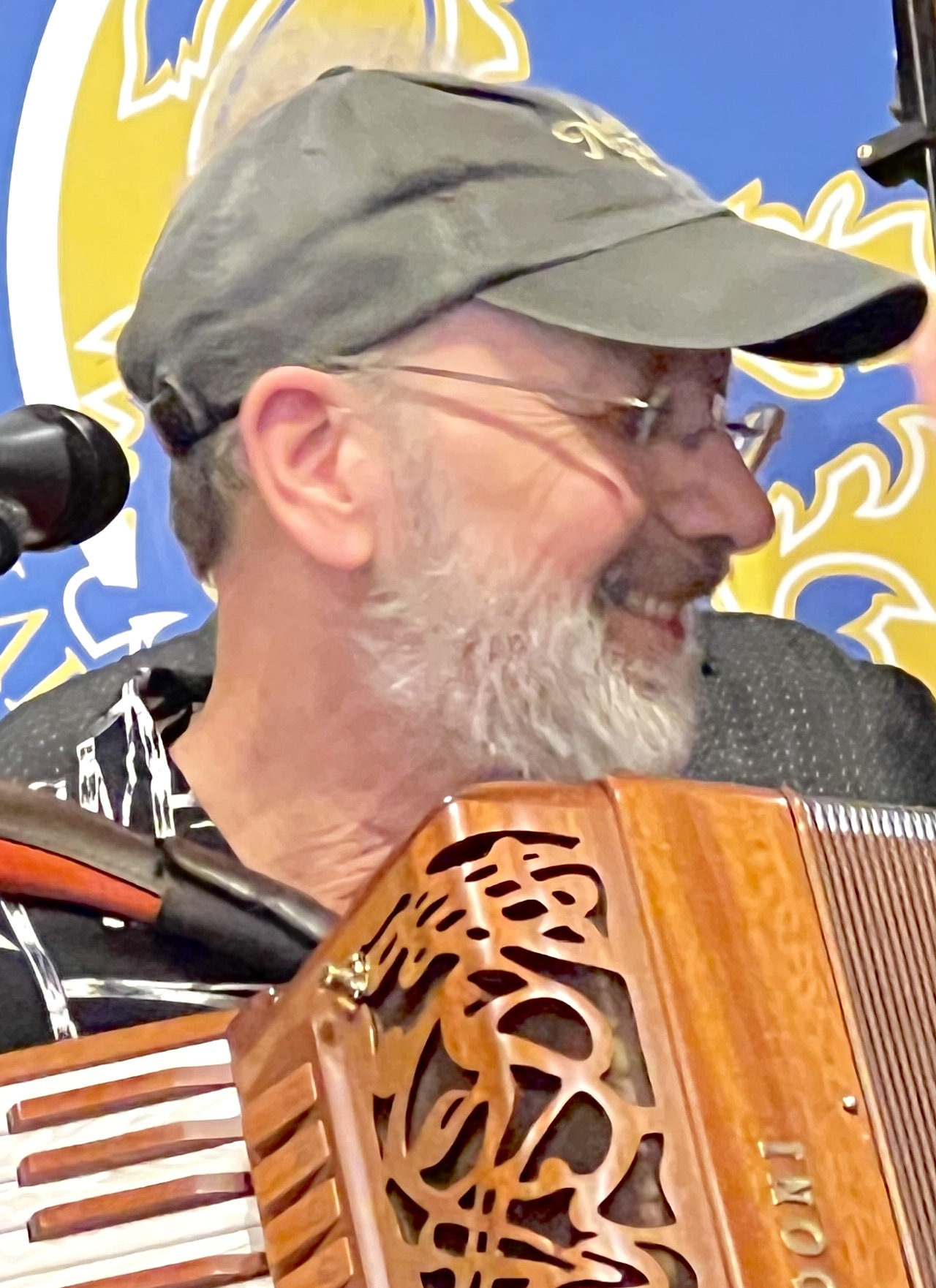

Background information
- Born: Jeffrey Joseph Taylor; February 28, 1957 (age 69); Batavia, NY
- Genres: Country, Jazz, Pop
- Occupations: Musician, bandleader
- Instruments: Accordion, Keyboards
- Years active: 1975–present

Jeffrey Joseph Taylor (born February 28, 1957) is a Nashville-based bandleader and multi-instrumentalist, primarily known for keyboards and accordion. He is a long-time member of the Grammy-winning Western swing band, The Time Jumpers. As a bandleader, he conducted hundreds of shows at Nashville's Opryland USA and the General Jackson riverboat. and backed up many artists performing on the Grand Ole Opry. As a session musician, he has recorded with Paul Simon, Harry Connick Jr., Elvis Costello, George Strait, and Vince Gill. He was a featured artist on Ricky Skaggs' album, Instrumentals, winning a Grammy in 2007 for Best Bluegrass Album. He was musical director for the live stage production Always, Patsy Cline in its two-year run at Nashville's Ryman Auditorium.

== Early life ==
He grew up in western New York, in Batavia, located between Buffalo and Rochester. His family was musically inclined; his father was a trumpet player who led a five-piece polka band called the "Variety Kings". His brother played drums. Taylor was given an accordion at age 5 and, by age 10, was performing in his father's band. In his teens, he became interested in piano and guitar, and traded his accordion at age 18 for a Gibson ES-335 electric guitar, later quipping, "It was easier to meet girls with a guitar than with an accordion". By then, he had become proficient on trumpet, fiddle, bass, guitar, trombone, and performed in a number of different bands. He studied classical piano the Eastman School of Music in Rochester, New York, then served in the Air Force at Wright-Patterson Air Force Base in Ohio in the early 1980s. He was a member of the Air Force group, "Band of Flight", and led a jazz group. After leaving the Air Force, he worked in Dayton, Ohio, assembling bicycles and grills for stores like Kmart. In an interview, he said, "If somebody still has a bike or gas grill from the '80's, I may have put it together." In 1990, he moved to Nashville to pursue a music career.

== Career ==
In Nashville, he began by recording several solo piano albums on a local label. He was hired as bandleader on the show Hee Haw Live, which featured George Lindsey and Grandpa Jones. Taylor appeared regularly at the Grand Ole Opry with Cajun country artist Jimmy C. Newman. He performed hundreds of shows as band leader at Opryland Theme Park and the General Jackson riverboat, and The Skaggs Family Christmas Tour. He was a featured artist on the 2006 album by Ricky Skaggs and Kentucky Thunder entitled Instrumentals, which won a Grammy in 2007 for Best Bluegrass Album. Besides playing accordion, piano and guitar, Taylor can add solos on lesser-known instruments including the concertina, penny whistle, and bouzouki. As a soloist, he performed on accordion with the Nashville Symphony Orchestra.

Taylor recorded with Elvis Costello in 2009 on the album, Secret, Profane & Sugarcane, and toured the US with Costello, who called the band "The Sugarcanes". This was followed by a world tour in 2010 featuring Taylor. He was musical director for the live stage production, Always, Patsy Cline, for its two-year run at Nashville's Ryman Auditorium. The production, written by Ted Swindley, debuted in Nashville in 1993 and developed a national following, leading to licensing for local productions in many US cities. He was featured on the 2003 Martina McBride album, Martina, which reached double platinum record sales. Taylor recorded with many other established artists including Paul Simon, Ricky Skaggs, Harry Connick Jr., George Strait, Elvis Costello, and Vince Gill.

== Time Jumpers ==
Taylor is a member of Time Jumpers, a Grammy-winning group of ten of Nashville's elite session players, who began playing Western swing music just for their own enjoyment. He has performed with them for over 20 years. He began as their pianist, but after about six months, because he had a time conflict, Taylor brought his accordion to a gig, with apologies to the players that he did not have time to get his piano. The band members embraced the accordion sound, and insisted he make the instrument a permanent part of the band. After about six years, he went back to piano, but uses both.
