= Brand New Strings =

Studio album by Ricky Skaggs and Kentucky Thunder
- Released: September 28, 2004
- Studios: Skaggs Place Studios (Hendersonville, Tennessee)
- Genre: Bluegrass music
- Length: 44:36
- Label: Skaggs Family Records
- Producer: Ricky Skaggs

Ricky Skaggs chronology
The Three Pickers (2003)	Brand New Strings (2004)	Instrumentals (2006)

Professional ratings
Review scores
Source	Rating
Allmusic	3.5/5 stars

Brand New Strings is an album by Ricky Skaggs and Kentucky Thunder, released through Skaggs Family Records on September 28, 2004. In 2005, the album won the group the Grammy Award for Best Bluegrass Album.

== Track listing ==
No.	Title	Writer(s)	Length
1.	"Sally Jo"	Buddy Killen; Doug Kershaw	4:27
2.	"Sis Draper"	Guy Clark; Shawn Camp	3:44
3.	"I Corinthians 1:18"	Ricky Skaggs	3:48
4.	"Enjoy the Ride"	David Vincent Williams; Donald Edmond Rollins; Tommy Conners	3:26
5.	"Lonesome and Dry as a Bone"	Shawn Camp; Matt Lindsey; Mel Tillis Jr.	3:16
6.	"Brand New Strings"	Steve Leslie; Keith Sewell	3:47
7.	"Spread a Little Love Around"	Harley Allen; John Wiggins	2:34
8.	"Appalachian Joy"	Ricky Skaggs	3:23
9.	"If I Had It All Again to Do"	Shawn Lane	3:21
10.	"Love Does It Every Time"	Tony Mullins; Bobby Terry	3:34
11.	"Why Did I Wait So Long?"	Shawn Lane	3:08
12.	"My Father's Son"	Ricky Skaggs; George Green	2:59
13.	"Monroe Dancin'"	Ricky Skaggs	3:09
Total length:			44:36

== Personnel ==
Ricky Skaggs and Kentucky Thunder

- Ricky Skaggs – lead vocals, harmony vocals, guitar, mandolin, gut-string guitar, guitar solo, clawhammer banjo, hi-strung acoustic guitar, Papoose guitar
- Cody Kilby – guitar, banjo, guitar solo
- Bryan Sutton – guitar
- Andy Leftwich – mandolin, fiddle
- Mark Fain – bass
- Paul Brewster – harmony vocals
- Darrin Vincent – harmony vocals

Guest musicians

- Tim Lauer – accordion, portative organ
- Jeff Taylor – accordion
- Johnny Hyland – electric guitar
- Jim Mills – banjo
- Molly Skaggs – dulcimer
- Sam Bacco – percussion, bells, spoons
- Stuart Duncan – fiddle
- Rebecca Lynn Howard – harmony vocals
- Keith Sewell – harmony vocals
- Sharon White – harmony vocals

Production

- Ricky Skaggs – producer
- Brent King – recording, mixing
- Lee Groitzsch – recording, mixing
- Andrew Mendelson – mastering at Georgetown Masters (Nashville, Tennessee)
- Rupert Neve – design
- Erick Anderson – photography
- Star Klem – wardrobe

== Chart performance ==
Chart (2004)	Peak position
U.S. Billboard Top Bluegrass Albums	1
U.S. Billboard Top Country Albums	60
