= Honoring the Fathers of Bluegrass: Tribute to 1946 and 1947 =

Studio album by Ricky Skaggs and Kentucky Thunder
- Released: March 25, 2008
- Studios: Skaggs Place Studios (Hendersonville, Tennessee)
- Genre: Bluegrass
- Length: 37:14
- Label: Skaggs Family
- Producer: Ricky Skaggs

Ricky Skaggs chronology
Salt of the Earth (2007)	Honoring the Fathers of Bluegrass: Tribute to 1946 and 1947 (2008)	Solo (Songs My Dad Loved) (2009)

Professional ratings
Review scores
Source	Rating
Allmusic	3.5/5 stars

Honoring the Fathers of Bluegrass: Tribute to 1946 and 1947 is an album by Ricky Skaggs and Kentucky Thunder, released through Skaggs Family Records on March 25, 2008. In 2009, the album won the group the Grammy Award for Best Bluegrass Album.

== Track listing ==
Honoring the Fathers of Bluegrass: Tribute to 1946 and 1947 track listing
No.	Title	Writer(s)	Length
1.	"Goin' Back to Old Kentucky"	Bill Monroe	3:06
2.	"When You're Lonely"	Lester Flatt	3:04
3.	"Toy Heart"	Bill Monroe	3:31
4.	"It's Mighty Dark to Travel"	Bill Monroe	3:05
5.	"Mother's Only Sleeping"	Ralph Stanley	3:12
6.	"Bluegrass Breakdown"	Bill Monroe	2:55
7.	"Little Cabin Home on the Hill"	Lester Flatt	3:15
8.	"Mansions for Me"	Bill Monroe	3:28
9.	"Sweetheart You Done Me Wrong"	Lester Flatt	2:56
10.	"Why Did You Wander"	Lester Flatt	2:50
11.	"Remember the Cross"	Bill Monroe; Howard Watts	3:00
12.	"The Old Crossroad"	Charlie Monroe	2:52
Total length:			37:14

== Personnel ==
Ricky Skaggs and Kentucky Thunder

- Ricky Skaggs – lead vocals (1–4, 7–12), mandolin
- Cody Kilby – guitar, guitar solo (3, 6)
- Jim Mills – banjo (2–10, 12), bass vocals (11)
- Mark Fain – bass (1–10, 12)
- Andy Leftwich – fiddle (1–10, 12)
- Paul Brewster – tenor vocals (1–5, 7–11)
- Darrin Vincent – baritone vocals (11)

Special guests

- Earl Scruggs – banjo (1)
- Del McCoury – tenor vocals (12)

Production

- Ricky Skaggs – producer, liner notes, additional photography
- Brent King – recording, mixing
- Lee Groitzsch – assistant engineer
- Andrew Mendelson – mastering at Georgetown Masters (Nashville, Tennessee)
- Erick Anderson – design, photography
- Gordon Gillingham – additional photography
- John Hood – additional photography
- Candy Burton – make-up, hair stylist
- Charlotte Scott for RS Entertainment, Inc. – management

== Chart performance ==
Chart performance for Honoring the Fathers of Bluegrass: Tribute to 1946 and 1947
Chart (2008)	Peak position
US Billboard 200	191
US Independent Albums (Billboard)	26
US Top Bluegrass Albums (Billboard)	1
US Top Country Albums (Billboard)	29
