= Instrumentals (Ricky Skaggs and Kentucky Thunder album) =

Studio album by Ricky Skaggs and Kentucky Thunder
- Released: August 1, 2006
- Studios: Skaggs Place Studios (Hendersonville, Tennessee)
- Genre: Bluegrass music
- Length: 47:32
- Label: Skaggs Family Records
- Producer: Ricky Skaggs

Ricky Skaggs chronology
Brand New Strings (2004)	Instrumentals (2006)	Ricky Skaggs & Bruce Hornsby (2007)

Professional ratings
Review scores
Source	Rating
Allmusic	3.5/5 stars

Instrumentals is an album by Ricky Skaggs and Kentucky Thunder, released through Skaggs Family Records on August 1, 2006. In 2007, the album won the group the Grammy Award for Best Bluegrass Album.

== Track listing ==
All music by Ricky Skaggs and Kentucky Thunder.

1. "Going to Richmond" – 3:41
2. "Missing Vassar" – 4:25
3. "Wayward to Hayward" – 5:22
4. "Montana Slim" – 3:32
5. "Crossing the Briney" – 7:07
6. "Crossville" – 3:48
7. "Gallatin Rag" – 4:08
8. "Dawg's Breath" – 5:12
9. "Spam Jelly" – 3:30
10. "Goin' to the Ceili" – 3:33
11. "Polk City" – 3:14

== Personnel ==
Ricky Skaggs and Kentucky Thunder

- Ricky Skaggs – mandolin, archtop guitar (1, 3–11), Clawhammer-style banjo (1), electric guitar (2, 3, 8), percussion (2), high-string guitar (5), mandocello (5)
- Jeff Taylor – accordion (1, 5, 6, 10), whistle (5), penny whistle (10)
- Cody Kilby – rhythm guitars
- Jim Mills – banjo (1–4, 6, 8–11)
- Mark Fain – bass
- Andy Leftwich – fiddle
- Andy Statman – clarinet (7)

Additional musicians

- The Nashville String Machine – orchestra (5)
- Jim Gray – orchestrations and conductor (5)
- Carl Gorodetzky – contractor (5)

== Production ==
- Ricky Skaggs – producer
- Lee Groitzsch – recording, mixing
- Brent King – recording, mixing
- Andrew Mendelson – mastering at Georgetown Masters (Nashville, Tennessee)
- Erick Anderson – design, photography
- Christoph Giese – photography
- RS Entertainment, Inc. – management

== Chart performance ==
Chart (2006)	Peak position
U.S. Billboard Top Bluegrass Albums	1
U.S. Billboard Top Country Albums	73
