= Comin' Home to Stay =

Studio album by Ricky Skaggs
- Released: March 28, 1988
- Recorded: 1987
- Studios: Treasure Isle Recorders (Nashville, Tennessee)
- Genre: Country
- Length: 33:07
- Label: Epic
- Producer: Ricky Skaggs

Ricky Skaggs chronology
Love's Gonna Get Ya! (1986)	Comin' Home to Stay (1988)	Kentucky Thunder (1989)

Singles from Comin' Home to Stay
- 1. "Thanks Again" Released: June 11, 1988

Professional ratings
Review scores
Source	Rating
Allmusic	3/5 stars

Comin' Home to Stay is the ninth studio album by American country music artist Ricky Skaggs. It was released in 1988 via Epic Records. The album peaked at number 12 on the Billboard Top Country Albums chart.

== Track listing ==
No.	Title	Writer(s)	Length
1.	"I'm Tired"	Buck Peddy, Webb Pierce, Mel Tillis	2:38
2.	"Hold Whatcha Got"	Jimmy Martin	3:10
3.	"(Angel on My Mind) That's Why I'm Walkin'"	Melvin Endsley, Stonewall Jackson	2:52
4.	"Home Is Wherever You Are"	Wayland Patton	3:33
5.	"If You Don't Believe the Bible"	Carl Jackson, Glenn Sutton	2:57
6.	"San Antonio Rose"	Bob Wills	4:07
7.	"Lord, She Sure Is Good at Lovin' Me"	Paul Overstreet, Randy Travis	2:55
8.	"Old Kind of Love"	Overstreet	3:29
9.	"Thanks Again"	Jim Rushing	3:36
10.	"Woman You Won't Break Mine"	Hunter Moore, Rushing	3:32

== Personnel ==
- Ricky Skaggs – lead vocals, acoustic guitar, harmony vocals (1, 2, 7, 8, 10), electric guitar (1, 2, 10), bus driver (2), mandolin (4, 10)
- Mike Rojas – acoustic piano (1–4, 6–8, 10)
- Steve Gibson – electric guitar (4, 7), banjo (10)
- Carl Jackson – acoustic guitar (5)
- Terry Crisp – pedal steel guitar (1, 3, 6–8)
- Lloyd Green – pedal steel guitar (4, 10)
- J.D. Crowe – banjo (2)
- Jerry Douglas – dobro (2)
- Jesse Chambers – bass (1–4, 6–8, 10)
- Mike Kennedy – drums (1–3, 6, 7)
- Eddie Bayers – drums (4, 8, 10)
- Bobby Hicks – fiddle (1–3, 6, 7)
- Mark O'Connor – fiddle (10)
- Sharon White-Skaggs – lead vocals (4), harmony vocals (4, 7)
- The Whites – harmony vocals (5)
- Chris Austin – harmony vocals (6)
- Wayland Patton – harmony vocals (6)

== Production ==
- Ricky Skaggs – producer
- Ed Seay – engineer, mixing
- Tom Harding – assistant engineer, mix assistant
- Scott Hendricks – assistant engineer, mix assistant
- Danny Johnston – assistant engineer, mix assistant
- Mike Poole – assistant engineer, mix assistant
- Denny Purcell – mastering at Georgetown Masters (Nashville, Tennessee)
- Bill Johnson – art direction
- Rollow Welch – art assistance
- Tania Owen – hand tinting
- Jim "Señor" McGuire – photography
- Bobbie Phillips – lettering
- Ricky Skaggs Enterprises – management

== Chart performance ==
Chart (1988)	Peak position
U.S. Billboard Top Country Albums	12
