= He Was On to Somethin' (So He Made You) =

Single by Ricky Skaggs

from the album Kentucky Thunder
- B-side: "When I Love"
- Released: September 1, 1990
- Genre: Country
- Length: 2:38
- Label: Epic
- Songwriter: Sonny Curtis
- Producers: Ricky Skaggs, Steve Buckingham

Ricky Skaggs singles chronology
"Hummingbird" (1990)	"He Was On to Somethin' (So He Made You)" (1990)	"Resltess" (1991)

"He Was On to Somethin' (So He Made You)" is a song written by Sonny Curtis, and recorded by American country music artist Ricky Skaggs. It was released in September 1990 as the fifth single from the album Kentucky Thunder. The song reached #25 on the Billboard Hot Country Singles & Tracks chart.

== Chart performance ==
Chart (1990)	Peak position
Canada Country Singles (RPM)	6
US Hot Country Songs (Billboard)	25

=== Year-end charts ===
Chart (1990)	Position
Canada Country Tracks (RPM)	79
