= Kentucky Thunder (album) =

Studio album by Ricky Skaggs
- Released: May 26, 1989
- Recorded: 1988
- Studios: Treasure Island Studios, Digital Recorders, Eleven Eleven Studio and Nightingale Studios (Nashville, Tennessee); Morningstar Studios (Spring House, Pennsylvania)
- Genre: Country
- Length: 29:59
- Label: Epic
- Producers: Steve Buckingham Ricky Skaggs

Ricky Skaggs chronology
Comin' Home to Stay (1988)	Kentucky Thunder (1989)	My Father's Son (1991)

Singles from Kentucky Thunder
- 1. "Lovin' Only Me" Released: February 1989; 2. "Let It Be You" Released: July 1989; 3. "Heartbreak Hurricane" Released: December 9, 1989; 4. "Hummingbird" Released: April 21, 1990; 5. "He Was On to Somethin' (So He Made You)" Released: September 1, 1990

Kentucky Thunder is the tenth studio album by American country music artist Ricky Skaggs. It was released in 1989 via Epic Records. The album peaked at number 18 on the Billboard Top Country Albums chart.

== Track listing ==
No.	Title	Writer(s)	Length
1.	"Hummingbird"	Tim DuBois, Greg Jennings	3:08
2.	"Lovin' Only Me"	Hillary Kanter, Even Stevens	3:33
3.	"The Fields of Home"	Larry Cordle, Larry Shell	3:56
4.	"Heartbreak Hurricane"	Cordle, Jim Rushing	2:37
5.	"Let It Be You"	Harry Stinson, Kevin Welch	2:41
6.	"Lonesome for You"	Cordle, Shell	2:21
7.	"Kentucky Thunder"	Cordle, Rushing	2:55
8.	"When I Love"	Paul Overstreet, Don Schlitz	3:02
9.	"He Was On to Somethin' (So He Made You)"	Sonny Curtis	2:37
10.	"Casting My Shadow in the Road"	Rushing, Randy Scruggs	3:34
11.	"Saviour, Save Me from Myself"	Cordle, Rushing	2:30

== Personnel ==
- Ricky Skaggs – lead vocals, backing vocals (1–4, 6–10), mandolin (1, 4, 5, 7–9), acoustic guitar (2, 4, 5, 7, 10), fiddle (9), triangle (9)
- Barry Beckett – acoustic piano (1–3, 6–8)
- Shane Keister – acoustic piano (4, 9)
- Joey Miskulin – accordion (9)
- Mark Casstevens – acoustic guitar (1–3, 6–10)
- Mac McAnally – acoustic guitar (1, 3, 4, 6)
- Albert Lee – electric lead guitar (1, 2, 6)
- Steve Gibson – electric guitar, mandolin (2)
- Terry Crisp – steel guitar (3)
- Lloyd Green – steel guitar (5, 8–10)
- Béla Fleck – banjo (4, 7)
- Jerry Douglas – dobro (5–7)
- David Hungate – bass (1–8, 10)
- Roy Huskey Jr. – upright bass (1, 2, 4)
- Larry Paxton – bass (9)
- Eddie Bayers – drums
- Stuart Duncan – fiddle (1, 3–6, 10)
- Bobby Hicks – fiddle (7)
- Dennis Wilson – backing vocals (5)
- Curtis Young – backing vocals (5)

== Production ==
- Steve Buckingham – producer
- Ricky Skaggs – producer
- John Abbott – engineer
- Joe Bogan – engineer
- Rodney Good – engineer
- Patrick Hutchinson – engineer
- John Hurley – engineer
- Doug Johnson – engineer, mixing (2)
- Brad Jones – engineer
- Kyle Lehning – engineer
- George Massenburg – engineer, mixing (1, 3–10)
- Pat McMakin – engineer
- Gary Paczosa – engineer
- Mike Poole – engineer
- Dennis Ritchie – engineer
- Ed Seay – engineer
- Denny Purcell – mastering at Georgetown Masters (Nashville, Tennessee)
- Bill Johnson – art direction
- Rollow Welch – art assistance
- Michael Rutherford – photography
- Earl Cox – hair stylist
- Elizabeth Linamen – make-up
- Ricky Skaggs Enterprises – management

== Charts ==
=== Weekly charts ===
Chart (1989)	Peak position
Canadian Country Albums (RPM)	27
US Top Country Albums (Billboard)	18

=== Year-end charts ===
Chart (1989)	Position
US Top Country Albums (Billboard)	64
