= Ancient Tones =

Studio album by Ricky Skaggs and Kentucky Thunder
- Released: January 26, 1999
- Studios: MCA Recording Studios (Universal City, California); Sound Kitchen (Franklin, Tennessee)
- Genre: Bluegrass music
- Length: 41:20
- Label: Skaggs Family Records
- Producer: Ricky Skaggs

Ricky Skaggs chronology
Bluegrass Rules! (1997)	Ancient Tones (1999)	Soldier of the Cross (1999)

Professional ratings
Review scores
Source	Rating
Allmusic	4.5/5 stars

Ancient Tones is an album by Ricky Skaggs and Kentucky Thunder, released through Skaggs Family Records on January 26, 1999. In 2000, the album won the group the Grammy Award for Best Bluegrass Album.

== Track listing ==
1. "Walls of Time" (Monroe, Rowan) – 4:18
2. "Lonesome Night" (Stanley) – 3:32
3. "How Mountain Girls Can Love" (Rakes, Stanley) – 2:00
4. "Mighty Dark to Travel" (Monroe) – 2:35
5. "Carolina Mountain Home" (Scarborough, Wright) – 2:08
6. "Connemara" (Skaggs) – 3:11
7. "Coal Minin' Man" (Mills) – 3:51
8. "I Believed in You Darlin'" (Monroe) – 3:00
9. "Pig in a Pen" (traditional) – 1:58
10. "Give Us Rain" (Foster) – 3:54
11. "Boston Boy" (traditional) – 2:30
12. "Little Bessie" (traditional) – 8:23

== Personnel ==
Ricky Skaggs and Kentucky Thunder

- Ricky Skaggs – lead vocals, mandolin, guitar (1, 7), archtop guitar (2, 5, 6, 8, 11), spike hammer (7), lead guitar (10), rhythm guitar (10, 12), bodhrán (12)
- Bryan Sutton – lead guitar (1, 4, 6, 9, 11), rhythm guitar (2, 3, 8), guitar (5, 7, 10, 12)
- Paul Brewster – rhythm guitar (2–6, 11), tenor vocals (2–5, 7–9)
- Mark Fain – bass
- Bobby Hicks – fiddle (3–6, 8, 9, 11)
- Darrin Vincent – vocals (2), baritone vocals (3, 8, 9)

Guest musicians and vocalists

- Jerry Douglas – Weissenborn guitar (1, 7)
- Jim Mills – banjo (2–6, 8, 9, 11)
- Stuart Duncan – fiddle (1, 2, 7, 10)
- Mary Alice Hoepfinger – harp (12)
- John Cowan – tenor vocals (1)
- Cheryl White – backing vocals (10)
- Sharon White – backing vocals (10)

Production

- Ricky Skaggs – producer
- Brent King – recording, mixing
- Tye Bellar – recording, mixing
- Graham Lewis – recording, mixing, assistant engineer
- King Williams – recording, mixing, assistant engineer
- Chris Stone – assistant engineer
- Al Schulman – additional mixing (3, 4, 6, 9, 11)
- Denny Purcell – mastering at Georgetown Masters (Nashville, Tennessee)
- Don Cobb – mastering assistant
- Jim Sherraden – art design, layout
- Tony Baker – photography
- Stan Strickland – management

== Chart performance ==
Chart (1999)	Peak position
U.S. Billboard Top Country Albums	46
