= Life's Too Long (To Live Like This) =

Single by Ricky Skaggs

from the album My Father's Son
- B-side: "Lonesome for You"
- Released: August 17, 1991
- Genre: Country
- Length: 3:52
- Label: Epic
- Songwriters: Lonnie Wilson, John Barlow Jarvis, Don Cook
- Producers: Ricky Skaggs, Mac McAnally

Ricky Skaggs singles chronology
"Restless" (1991)	"Life's Too Long (To Live Like This)" (1991)	"Same Ol' Love" (1991)

"Life's Too Long (To Live Like This)" is a song written by Lonnie Wilson, John Barlow Jarvis and Don Cook, and recorded by American country music artist Ricky Skaggs. It was released in August 1991 as the first single from the album My Father's Son. The song reached #37 on the Billboard Hot Country Singles & Tracks chart.

== Chart performance ==
Chart (1991)	Peak position
Canada Country Singles (RPM)	15
US Hot Country Songs (Billboard)	37
