= Heartbreak Hurricane =

Single by Ricky Skaggs

from the album Kentucky Thunder
- B-side: "Casting My Shadow in the Road"
- Released: December 9, 1989
- Genre: Country
- Length: 2:38
- Label: Epic
- Songwriters: Larry Cordle, Jim Rushing
- Producers: Ricky Skaggs, Steve Buckingham

Ricky Skaggs singles chronology
"Let It Be You" (1989)	"Heartbreak Hurricane" (1989)	"Hummingbird" (1990)

"Heartbreak Hurricane" is a song written by Larry Cordle and Jim Rushing, and recorded by American country music artist Ricky Skaggs. It was released in December 1989 as the third single from the album Kentucky Thunder. The song reached No. 13 on the Billboard Hot Country Singles & Tracks chart.

== Chart performance ==
Chart (1989–1990)	Peak position
Canada Country Singles (RPM)	5
US Hot Country Songs (Billboard)	13

=== Year-end charts ===
Chart (1990)	Position
Canada Country Tracks (RPM)	57
