= Heartbroke =

Single by Ricky Skaggs

from the album Highways & Heartaches
- B-side: "Don't Think I'll Cry"
- Released: July 1982
- Genre: Country
- Length: 3:16
- Label: Epic
- Songwriter(s): Guy Clark
- Producer(s): Ricky Skaggs

Ricky Skaggs singles chronology
"I Don't Care" (1982)	"Heartbroke" (1982)	"I Wouldn't Change You If I Could" (1982)

"Heartbroke" is a song written by Guy Clark, and originally recorded by Rodney Crowell on his 1980 album But What Will the Neighbors Think.

It was later recorded by American country music artist Ricky Skaggs. It was released in July 1982 as the first single from the album Highways & Heartaches. The song was Skaggs' third #1 on the country chart. The single stayed at #1 for one week and spent a total of eleven weeks on the country chart.

== Charts ==
Chart (1982)	Peak position
US Hot Country Songs (Billboard)	1
Canadian RPM Country Tracks	1

== Other versions ==
George Strait released his version on his second album Strait from the Heart in 1982, not knowing the song had been recorded by Skaggs about two weeks earlier. The Marshall Tucker Band also released a version on their 1982 album Tuckerized.
