= Thanks Again =

Single by Ricky Skaggs

from the album Comin' Home to Stay
- B-side: "If You Don't Believe the Bible"
- Released: June 11, 1988
- Genre: Country
- Length: 3:36
- Label: Epic
- Songwriter(s): Jim Rushing
- Producer(s): Ricky Skaggs

Ricky Skaggs singles chronology
"(Angel on My Mind) That's Why I'm Walkin'" (1988)	"Thanks Again" (1988)	"Old Kind of Love" (1988)

"Thanks Again" is a song written by Jim Rushing and recorded by American country music artist Ricky Skaggs. It was released in June 1988 as the third single from the album Comin' Home to Stay. The song reached #17 on the Billboard Hot Country Singles & Tracks chart.

== Chart performance ==
Chart (1988)	Peak position
US Hot Country Songs (Billboard)	17
Canadian RPM Country Tracks	10
