= Crying My Heart Out Over You =

Single by Ricky Skaggs

from the album Waitin' for the Sun to Shine
- B-side: "Lost to a Stranger"
- Released: December 1981
- Genre: Country
- Length: 3:00
- Label: Epic
- Songwriters: Lester Flatt; Earl Scruggs; Carl Butler; Earl Sherry
- Producer: Ricky Skaggs

Ricky Skaggs singles chronology
"You May See Me Walkin'" (1981)	"Crying My Heart Out Over You" (1981)	"I Don't Care" (1982)

"Crying My Heart Out Over You" is a song written by Lester Flatt, Earl Scruggs, Carl Butler, and Earl Sherry and was originally recorded by Flatt & Scruggs, which peaked at number 21 on the national country chart in 1960.

In December 1981, the song was recorded by American country music artist Ricky Skaggs as the third single from his album Waitin' for the Sun to Shine. It was Skaggs' third country hit and the first of eleven number one hits on the country chart. The single stayed at number one for one week and spent a total of twenty-three weeks on the country chart.

== Charts ==
=== Weekly charts ===
Chart (1981–1982)	Peak position
US Hot Country Songs (Billboard)	1
Canadian RPM Country Tracks	3

=== Year-end charts ===
Chart (1982)	Position
US Hot Country Songs (Billboard)	4
