= Highway 40 Blues =

Single by Ricky Skaggs

from the album Highways & Heartaches
- B-side: "Don't Let Your Sweet Love Die"
- Released: March 1983
- Genre: Country
- Length: 3:10
- Label: Epic
- Songwriter(s): Larry Cordle
- Producer(s): Ricky Skaggs

Ricky Skaggs singles chronology
"I Wouldn't Change You If I Could" (1982)	"Highway 40 Blues" (1983)	"You've Got a Lover" (1983)

"Highway 40 Blues" is a song written by Larry Cordle, and recorded by American country music artist Ricky Skaggs. It was released in March 1983 as the third single from the album Highways & Heartaches. The song was Skaggs' fifth number one on the country chart and his fifth consecutive #1. The single stayed at #1 for one week and spent a total of 12 weeks on the chart.

The song was covered in Spanish as "Blues de la Nacional II" by La Guardia.

The song was also covered by Daniel O'Donnell on his Two Sides Of album which was released in 1985.

According to songwriter Cordle, "A lot of people who hear it think it's about Interstate 40, which runs right through Nashville, but I actually wrote it about that little state highway in Kentucky."

== Charts ==
=== Weekly charts ===
Chart (1983)	Peak position
US Hot Country Songs (Billboard)	1
Canadian RPM Country Tracks	1

=== Year-end charts ===
Chart (1983)	Position
US Hot Country Songs (Billboard)	29
