= Hummingbird (Restless Heart song) =

Single by Ricky Skaggs

from the album Kentucky Thunder
- B-side: "Kentucky Thunder"
- Released: April 21, 1990
- Genre: Country
- Length: 3:09
- Label: Epic
- Songwriters: Greg Jennings, Tim DuBois
- Producers: Ricky Skaggs, Steve Buckingham

Ricky Skaggs singles chronology
"Heartbreak Hurricane" (1990)	"Hummingbird" (1990)	"He Was On to Somethin' (So He Made You)" (1990)

"Hummingbird" is a song recorded by the American country music artist Ricky Skaggs. It was released in April 1990 as the fourth single from the album Kentucky Thunder and reached #20 on the Billboard Hot Country Singles & Tracks chart.

== Other versions ==
The song was originally recorded by Restless Heart, whose guitarist Greg Jennings co-wrote it with Tim DuBois, on their 1986 album Wheels. Their version was the B-side to the album's single "Why Does It Have to Be (Wrong or Right)".

== Chart performance ==
Chart (1990)	Peak position
Canada Country Singles (RPM)	15
US Hot Country Songs (Billboard)	20
