= Cordell, Kentucky =

Unincorporated community in Kentucky, United States

Coordinates: 38°00′20″N 82°47′35″W

Cordell is an unincorporated community in Lawrence County, Kentucky, in the United States.

== History ==
A post office was established at Cordell in 1898, and remained in operation until it was discontinued in 1975. The community was named in honor of the Cordell family of settlers.

== Notable people ==
Country singer Ricky Skaggs was born in Cordell.
