= The New Nashville Cats =

Studio album by Mark O'Connor
- Released: April 16, 1991
- Recorded: 1989–90
- Genre: Country, country rock, bluegrass, western swing, instrumental country
- Length: 63:48
- Label: Warner Bros.
- Producer: Mark O'Connor, Jim Ed Norman

Mark O'Connor chronology
Retrospective (1990)	The New Nashville Cats (1991)	Johnny Appleseed (1992)

Professional ratings
Review scores
Source	Rating
Allmusic	4.5/5 stars

The New Nashville Cats is a country album by Mark O'Connor, in conjunction with a variety of other musical artists. O'Connor selected a group of over fifty Nashville musicians, many of whom had worked with him as session musicians. The album was intended to "showcase the instrumental side of the Nashville recording scene" (O'Connor's liner notes). It was awarded two Grammys: Best Country Instrumental Performance for O'Connor, and Best Country Collaboration with Vocals for Vince Gill, Ricky Skaggs, and Steve Wariner's performance in "Restless". This song also charted at #25 on Hot Country Songs in 1991.

== Track listing ==
All songs were composed by Mark O'Connor, except where noted.

1. "Bowtie" – 2:40
2. "Restless" (Carl Perkins) – 5:25
3. "Nashville Shuffle Boogie" – 6:10
4. "Pick It Apart" – 4:59
5. "Traveler's Ridge" – 3:35
6. "Granny White Special" – 3:53
7. "Cat in the Bag" – 2:43
8. "The Ballad of Sally Anne" (Traditional; lyrics by Alice Randall, arranged by O'Connor and Harry Stinson) – 2:36
9. "Swang" – 4:52
10. "Dance of the Ol' Swamp Rat" – 3:03
11. "A Bowl of Bula" – 4:05
12. "Limerock" (Traditional; arranged by O'Connor and Edgar Meyer) – 2:23
13. "Sweet Suzanne" – 5:12
14. "Orange Blossom Special" (Ervin T. Rouse) – 5:39
15. "Now It Belongs to You" (Steve Wariner) – 6:33

== Personnel ==
- Sam Bacco - marimba, percussion
- Russ Barenberg - acoustic guitar
- Eddie Bayers - drums
- Mike Brignardello - bass guitar
- Dennis Burnside - piano
- Sam Bush - mandolin
- Larry Byrom - acoustic guitar, electric guitar
- Mark Casstevens - acoustic guitar
- John Cowan - lead vocals on "The Ballad of Sally Anne"
- Jerry Douglas - Dobro
- Bessyl Duhon - accordion
- Béla Fleck - banjo
- Paul Franklin - pedal steel guitar
- Sonny Garrish - pedal steel guitar
- Steve Gibson - electric guitar
- Vince Gill - electric guitar and lead vocals on "Restless"
- Mike Haynes - trumpet
- Jim Horn - alto saxophone, baritone saxophone
- David Hungate - bass guitar
- Roy Huskey Jr. - upright bass
- Carl Jackson - acoustic guitar
- John Barlow Jarvis - piano, synthesizer
- Jerry Kroon - drums
- Mike Lawler - keyboards, synthesizer
- Paul Leim - drums
- Kenny Malone - percussion
- Brent Mason - electric guitar
- Bob Mater - drums
- Terry McMillan - harmonica, percussion
- Edgar Meyer - upright bass
- Mark O'Connor - fiddle, mandolin
- Larry Paxton - bass guitar
- Don Potter - acoustic guitar
- Michael Rhodes - bass guitar
- Tom Roady - percussion
- Matt Rollings - piano, synthesizer
- Charles Rose - trombone
- Brent Rowan - electric guitar
- Mark Schatz - banjo, upright bass
- David Schnaufer - Appalachian dulcimer
- Gove Scrivenor - autoharp
- Randy Scruggs - acoustic guitar
- Lisa Silver - background vocals on "Now It Belongs to You"
- Ricky Skaggs - electric guitar and lead vocals on "Restless"
- Denis Solee - tenor saxophone
- Harry Stinson - drums, percussion, background vocals on "The Balled of Sally Ann” and “Now It Belongs to You"
- Marty Stuart - mandolin and background vocals on "The Ballad of Sally Anne"
- Steve Turner - drums
- Billy Joe Walker Jr. - acoustic guitar
- Alisa Jones Wall - hammer dulcimer
- Steve Wariner - acoustic guitar on “Now It Belongs to You”, electric guitar on "Restless", lead vocals on "Restless" and "Now It Belongs to You"
- Roy Wooten - drums
- Victor Wooten - bass guitar
- Glenn Worf - bass guitar

== Chart performance ==
Chart (1991)	Peak position
U.S. Billboard Top Country Albums	44
U.S. Billboard Top Heatseekers	14
