= Bluegrass Rules! =

Studio album by Ricky Skaggs and Kentucky Thunder
- Released: October 21, 1997
- Studios: MCA Recording Studios (Universal City, California); Seismic Sound, Sound Emporium Studios and Woodland Sound Studios (Nashville, Tennessee)
- Genres: Bluegrass; Country
- Length: 35:00
- Label: Rounder
- Producer: Ricky Skaggs

Ricky Skaggs chronology
Life Is a Journey (1997)	Bluegrass Rules! (1997)	Ancient Tones (1999)

Professional ratings
Review scores
Source	Rating
Allmusic	4.5/5 stars

Bluegrass Rules! is an album by Ricky Skaggs and Kentucky Thunder, released through Rounder Records on October 21, 1997. In 1999, the album won the group the Grammy Award for Best Bluegrass Album.

== Track listing ==
1. "J.D.'s Words of Wisdom" – 0:05
2. "Get Up John" (Bill Monroe) – 4:06
3. "I Hope You've Learned" (Bill Carrigan, Eugene Butler) 2:20
4. "Think of What You've Done" (Carter Stanley) – 2:37
5. "Another Night" (Jack Adkins) – 3:57
6. "The Drunken Driver" (Paul Westmoreland) – 3:10
7. "Little Maggie" (Ralph Stanley) – 2:20
8. "Amanda Jewell" (Ricky Skaggs) – 2:51
9. "If I Lose" (Ralph Stanley) – 2:09
10. "Ridin' That Midnight Train" (Ralph Stanley) – 2:20
11. "Rank Stranger" (Albert E. Brumley) – 3:03
12. "Somehow Tonight" (Earl Scruggs) – 2:51
13. "Rawhide" (Bill Monroe) – 2:59
14. "Well Glory" – 0:12

== Personnel ==
Ricky Skaggs and Kentucky Thunder
- Ricky Skaggs – mandolin (2–6, 8–13), lead vocals (3–7, 10–12), rhythm guitar (7, 13), Gibson L-5 guitar (12)
- Paul Brewster – rhythm guitar (2, 4–11, 13), harmony vocals (3, 12), tenor vocals (4, 5, 9–11)
- Dennis Parker – rhythm guitar (2, 4–6, 8–11, 13), baritone vocals (4, 5, 9, 11), mandolin (7), spoken voice (14)
- Bryan Sutton – lead guitar solo (2, 4, 7–9, 11, 13), rhythm guitar (3, 5, 6, 10–12)
- Marc Pruett – banjo (2–4, 7–10, 12, 13)
- Mark Fain – bass (2–13)
- Bobby Hicks – fiddle (2–4, 8–10, 12), second fiddle (13)

Guest musicians and vocalists

- J.D. Sumner – spoken voice (1)
- Jerry Douglas – dobro (6)
- Stuart Duncan – fiddle (5–7), first fiddle (13)

Production

- Ricky Skaggs – producer, photography, liner notes
- Al Schulman – engineer
- Tom Davis – additional engineer
- Kent Bruce – assistant engineer
- Graham Lewis – assistant engineer
- Jason Stelluto – assistant engineer
- Chris Stone – assistant engineer
- King Williams – assistant engineer
- Denny Purcell – mastering at Georgetown Masters (Nashville, Tennessee)
- Don Cobb – mastering assistant
- Carlos Grier – mastering assistant
- Jonathan Russell – mastering assistant
- Craig Crutchfield – design
- Jim "Señor" McGuire – photography
- Alan Messer – photography
- Holly Ballard – make-up

== Chart performance ==
Chart (1997)	Peak position
U.S. Billboard Top Country Albums	45
