= Lovin' Only Me =

Single by Ricky Skaggs

from the album Kentucky Thunder
- B-side: "Home Is Wherever You Are"
- Released: February 1989
- Genre: Country
- Length: 3:33
- Label: Epic
- Songwriters: Even Stevens; Hillary Kanter
- Producers: Ricky Skaggs; Steve Buckingham

Ricky Skaggs singles chronology
"Old Kind of Love" (1988)	"Lovin' Only Me" (1989)	"Let It Be You" (1989)

"Lovin' Only Me" is a song written by Hillary Kanter and Even Stevens, and recorded by American country music artist Ricky Skaggs. It was released in February 1989 as the first single from the album Kentucky Thunder. The song was Skaggs' fourteenth and final number one on the country chart. The single went to number one for one week and spent a total of fifteen weeks on the country chart.

== Chart performance ==
Chart (1989)	Peak position
Canada Country Singles (RPM)	1
US Hot Country Songs (Billboard)	1

=== Year-end charts ===
Chart (1989)	Position
Canada Country Tracks (RPM)	13
US Country Songs (Billboard)	4
