= Salt of the Earth (Ricky Skaggs & The Whites album) =

Studio album by Ricky Skaggs and The Whites
- Released: September 25, 2007
- Studios: Skaggs Place Studios (Hendersonville, Tennessee)
- Genre: Bluegrass music
- Length: 46:04
- Label: Skaggs Family Records
- Producers: Ricky Skaggs; The Whites

Ricky Skaggs chronology
Ricky Skaggs & Bruce Hornsby (2007)	Salt of the Earth (2007)	Honoring the Fathers of Bluegrass: Tribute to 1946 and 1947 (2008)

Professional ratings
Review scores
Source	Rating
Allmusic	4/5 stars

Salt of the Earth is an album by Ricky Skaggs and The Whites, released through Skaggs Family Records on September 25, 2007. In 2008, the album won both a Grammy Award and a Dove Award for Best Southern/Country/Bluegrass album and Bluegrass Album of the Year respectively.

== Track listing ==
1. "Love Will Be Enough" (Janis Ian, Paul Overstreet) - 4:35
2. "Homesick for Heaven" (Kelly Willard) - 3:35
3. "Big Wheel" (Gibson) - 2:46
4. "Salt of the Earth" - 3:09
5. "Wreck on the Highway" - 3:31
6. "Farther Along" (J. R. Baxter) - 4:13
7. "Let It Shine" (White) - 3:41
8. "Near the Cross" - 3:58
9. "One Seed of Love" - 3:23
10. "This Old House" (Stuart Hamblen) - 2:43
11. "Wings of a Dove" (Bob Ferguson) - 3:55
12. "Blessed Assurance" - 3:29
13. "The Solid Rock" (Edward Mote) - 3:06

== Personnel ==
Ricky Skaggs & The Whites

- Ricky Skaggs – lead vocals (1, 4, 6, 9, 11), guitars, percussion (1, 3), harmony vocals (2, 3, 6, 7, 12, 13), mandolin (2, 4–6), dobro(4), guitar solo (6, 10), Dan Electro guitar (9), bouzouki (9, 12), electric guitar solo (11)
- Buck White – acoustic piano (3, 10), lead vocals (5, 8, 10), harmony vocals (11–13)
- Cheryl White – harmony vocals (1, 2, 4–12), lead vocals (3, 6, 13)
- Sharon White-Skaggs – harmony vocals (1, 3–6, 8–11, 13), lead vocals (2, 7, 12)

Additional musicians

- Jim "Moose" Brown – acoustic piano (2, 7), Hammond B3 organ (7)
- Jeff Taylor – accordion (12), acoustic piano (13)
- Cody Kilby – guitars (1, 3–12), guitar solo (12)
- Paul Franklin – steel guitar (2)
- Mark Fain – bass (1–12)
- Pat McInerney – drums (1–4, 9), percussion (4, 9)
- Paul Leim – drums (7), percussion (7)
- Brent King – additional percussion (1)
- Andy Leftwich – fiddle (1–5, 7–11), mandolin (7)
- Molly Skaggs – autoharp (6)

== Production ==
- Ricky Skaggs – producer, photography
- The Whites – producers
- Brent King – engineer
- Lee Groitzsch – assistant engineer
- Andrew Mendelson – mastering at Georgetown Masters (Nashville, Tennessee)
- Erick Anderson – album design, group photography
- Candy Burton – hair, make-up
- Charlotte Scott for RS Enterprises, Inc. – management for Ricky Skaggs
- John Dorris for The Hallmark Direction Company – management for The Whites

== Chart performance ==
Chart (2007)	Peak position
U.S. Billboard Top Bluegrass Albums	1
U.S. Billboard Top Country Albums	45
U.S. Billboard Top Independent Albums	47

== Awards ==
In 2008, the album won the Grammy Award for Best Southern/Country/Bluegrass Album at the 50th Grammy Awards. It also won the Dove Award for Bluegrass Album of the Year at the 39th GMA Dove Awards.
