= I Wouldn't Change You If I Could =

Single by Ricky Skaggs

from the album Highways & Heartaches
- B-side: "One Way Rider"
- Released: January 17, 1983
- Genre: Country
- Length: 3:02
- Label: Epic
- Songwriters: Paul Jones; Arthur Q. Smith
- Producer: Ricky Skaggs

Ricky Skaggs singles chronology
"Heartbroke" (1982)	"I Wouldn't Change You If I Could" (1983)	"Highway 40 Blues" (1983)

"I Wouldn't Change You If I Could" is a song originally recorded by country singer Jim Eanes in 1959 and credited to himself as songwriter. It was later more successfully recorded by American country music artist Ricky Skaggs. It was released in January 1983 as the second single from the album Highways & Heartaches. The song was Skaggs' fourth #1 on the country chart. The single stayed at #1 for one week and spent a total of 12 weeks on the country chart.

The song was actually written by Arthur Q. Smith and purportedly sold to Eanes, as Smith had sold him many of his songs. Smith also sold a 1/2 share of the song to Paul H. Jones, and retained the other half. When Skaggs' recording came out it was initially credited to Eanes, but once it became a hit, Smith's widow, Lillian Pritchett, sued the publisher. As Eanes couldn't show proof he had purchased the song, the song credits were transferred out of Eanes' name over to Smith's estate and Jones. Eanes went to his grave attesting that he actually wrote the song.

== Charts ==
=== Weekly charts ===
Chart (1983)	Peak position
US Hot Country Songs (Billboard)	1
Canadian RPM Country Tracks	1

=== Year-end charts ===
Chart (1983)	Position
US Hot Country Songs (Billboard)	13
