= Highways & Heartaches (Ricky Skaggs album) =

Studio album by Ricky Skaggs
- Released: 1982
- Studios: Audio Media Recorders (Nashville, Tennessee)
- Genre: Country
- Length: 36:55
- Label: Epic
- Producer: Ricky Skaggs

Ricky Skaggs chronology
Family & Friends (1982)	Highways & Heartaches (1982)	Don't Cheat in Our Hometown (1983)

Singles from Highways & Heartaches
- 1. "Heartbroke" Released: July 1982; 2. "I Wouldn't Change You If I Could" Released: January 17, 1983; 3. "Highway 40 Blues" Released: March 1983; 4. "You've Got a Lover" Released: July 1983

Professional ratings
Review scores
Source	Rating
Allmusic	4.5/5 stars

Highways & Heartaches is the fifth studio album by American country music artist Ricky Skaggs. It was released in 1982 via Epic Records. The album peaked at number 1 on the Billboard Top Country Albums chart.

This album is cited in the 2023 book Highways and Heartaches: How Ricky Skaggs, Marty Stuart, and Children of the New South Saved the Soul of Country Music, by the American academic Michael Streissguth. The book covers the evolution of country music from the rural routes of 1970s Appalachia to the 1980s country music boom.

== Track listing ==
CD
No.	Title	Writer(s)	Length
1.	"Heartbroke"	Guy Clark	3:16
2.	"You've Got a Lover"	Shake Russell	3:58
3.	"Don't Think I'll Cry"	Wayland Patton	2:39
4.	"Don't Let Your Sweet Love Die"	Zeke Manners, Clark Van Ness	3:58
5.	"Nothing Can Hurt You"	John Salz	4:44
6.	"I Wouldn't Change You If I Could"	Paul Jones, Arthur Q. Smith	3:02
7.	"Can't You Hear Me Callin'"	Bill Monroe	3:48
8.	"Highway 40 Blues"	Larry Cordle	3:10
9.	"Let's Love the Bad Times Away"	Patton	2:46
10.	"One Way Rider"	Rodney Crowell	5:27
Total length:			36:48

== Personnel ==
- Ricky Skaggs – lead vocals (1, 2, 4–6, 9), backing vocals (1, 2, 4–6), acoustic guitars, mandolins (2, 4, 8), fiddles (2), vocals (3, 7, 8, 10), Bender electric guitar (6), mandocaster (10)
- Mickey Merritt – acoustic piano (1, 8, 10)
- Dennis Burnside – acoustic piano (2, 5)
- Buck White – acoustic piano (3, 4, 6, 7, 9)
- Ray Flacke – electric guitar (1, 7, 8, 10), electric rhythm guitar (9)
- Bruce Bouton – steel guitar (1, 8, 10)
- Lloyd Green – steel guitar (2, 5)
- Weldon Myrick – steel guitar (3, 6, 9)
- Jerry Douglas – dobro (4, 7)
- Béla Fleck – banjo (8)
- Jesse Chambers – bass (1, 7, 8, 10)
- Joe Osborn – bass (2–6, 9)
- Ernie Ball – bass (4)
- Jerry Kroon – drums (1–3, 5, 6, 9)
- Rodney Price – drums (7, 8, 10)
- Eddie Bayers – percussion (7)
- Bobby Hicks – fiddles (1, 3, 4, 6, 7, 9)
- George Grantham – backing vocals (1)
- Sharon White-Skaggs – backing vocals (4–6), harmony vocals (9), vocals (9)
- The Lea Jane Singers (Lea Jane Berinati, Janie Fricke, Ginger Holladay and Anne Marie) – backing vocals (5)

== Production ==
- Ricky Skaggs – producer
- Marshall Morgan – engineer, production assistant
- Glenn Meadows – mastering at Masterfonics (Nashville, Tennessee)
- Virginia Team – art direction
- Beverly Parker – photography
- Chip Peay Enterprises – management

== Chart performance ==
Chart (1982)	Peak position
US Top Country Albums (Billboard)	1
US Billboard 200	61
