= You've Got a Lover =

Single by Ricky Skaggs

from the album Highways & Heartaches
- B-side: "Let's Love the Bad Times Over"
- Released: July 1983
- Genre: Country
- Length: 3:58
- Label: Epic
- Songwriter(s): Shake Russell
- Producer(s): Ricky Skaggs

Ricky Skaggs singles chronology
| "Highway 40 Blues" (1983) | "You've Got a Lover" (1983) | "Don't Cheat in Our Hometown" (1983) |

"You've Got a Lover" is a song written by Shake Russell and released on his first album (with Dana Cooper) in 1978, Songs On The Radio. It was later covered by American country music artist Ricky Skaggs on his album Highways & Heartaches, released in July 1982. It was the fourth single, released in July 1983, from this album and the song reached #2 on the Billboard Hot Country Singles chart and #1 on the RPM Country Tracks chart in Canada.

== Chart performance ==
| Chart (1983) | Peak position |
|---|---|
| US Hot Country Songs (Billboard) | 2 |
| Canadian RPM Country Tracks | 1 |
