= Let It Be You =

Single by Ricky Skaggs

from the album Kentucky Thunder
- B-side: "Fields of Home"
- Released: July 1989
- Genre: Country
- Length: 2:42
- Label: Epic
- Songwriters: Kevin Welch; Harry Stinson
- Producers: Ricky Skaggs; Steve Buckingham

Ricky Skaggs singles chronology
"Lovin' Only Me" (1989)	"Let It Be You" (1989)	"Heartbreak Hurricane" (1990)

"Let It Be You" is a song written by Kevin Welch and Harry Stinson, and recorded by American country music artist Ricky Skaggs. It was released in July 1989 as the second single from the album Kentucky Thunder. The song reached #5 on the Billboard Hot Country Singles chart.

== Chart performance ==
Chart (1989)	Peak position
Canada Country Singles (RPM)	3
US Hot Country Songs (Billboard)	5

=== Year-end charts ===
Chart (1989)	Position
Canada Country Tracks (RPM)	21
US Country Songs (Billboard)	83
