= Same Ol' Love =

Single by Ricky Skaggs

from the album My Father's Son
- B-side: "My Father's Son"
- Released: December 1991
- Genre: Country
- Length: 3:52
- Label: Epic
- Songwriters: Chris Austin; Greg Barnhill
- Producers: Mac McAnally; Ricky Skaggs

Ricky Skaggs singles chronology
"Life's Too Long (To Live Like This)" (1991)	"Same Ol' Love" (1991)	"From the Word Love" (1992)

"Same Ol' Love" is a song written by Chris Austin and Greg Barnhill, and recorded by American country music artist Ricky Skaggs. It was released in December 1991 as the second single from his album My Father's Son. The song reached number 12 on the Billboard Hot Country Singles & Tracks chart in April 1992.

== Chart performance ==
Chart (1991–1992)	Peak position
Canada Country Singles (RPM)	23
US Hot Country Songs (Billboard)	12
