= I Don't Care (Webb Pierce song) =

"I Don't Care" is a 1955 song written by Webb Pierce and Cindy Walker and originally performed by Pierce. The song spent twelve weeks at number one on the C&W Best Seller charts and spent a total of 32 weeks on the charts. "The B-side of "I Don't Care" a song entitled, "Your Good for Nothing Heart" spent six weeks on the Juke Box and C&W Jockey charts.

== Ricky Skaggs version ==
"I Don't Care"

Single by Ricky Skaggs

from the album Waitin' for the Sun to Shine
- B-side: "If That's the Way You Feel"
- Released: April 1982
- Genre: Country
- Length: 2:15
- Label: Epic
- Songwriter(s): Webb Pierce; Cindy Walker
- Producer(s): Ricky Skaggs

Ricky Skaggs singles chronology
| "Crying My Heart Out Over You" (1981) | "I Don't Care" (1982) | "Heartbroke" (1982) |

In April 1982, the song was released by American country music artist Ricky Skaggs as the fourth single from his album Waitin' for the Sun to Shine. It went to number one on the country charts for one week and was his second song to top the charts.

=== Weekly charts ===
| Chart (1982) | Peak position |
|---|---|
| US Hot Country Songs (Billboard) | 1 |
| Canadian RPM Country Tracks | 2 |

=== Year-end charts ===
| Chart (1982) | Position |
|---|---|
| US Hot Country Songs (Billboard) | 21 |
