= Waitin' for the Sun to Shine =

Studio album by Ricky Skaggs
- Released: May 1981
- Studios: Audio Media Recorders (Nashville, Tennessee)
- Genres: Country, bluegrass
- Length: 29:10
- Label: Epic
- Producer: Ricky Skaggs

Ricky Skaggs chronology
Sweet Temptation (1979)	Waitin' for the Sun to Shine (1981)	Family & Friends (1981)

Singles from Waitin' for the Sun to Shine
- 1. "You May See Me Walkin'" Released: August 1981; 2. "Crying My Heart Out Over You" Released: December 1981; 3. "I Don't Care" Released: April 1982

Professional ratings
Review scores
Source	Rating
Allmusic	3/5 stars

Waitin' for the Sun to Shine is the third studio album by American country music artist Ricky Skaggs. It was released in 1981 on Epic Records. Skaggs himself produced the album, and played on all the songs.

Four of the ten tracks were released as singles; "Don't Get Above Your Raisin'" peaked at number 16 on the U.S. Country charts, while charting at number 47 in Canada. The next three singles were much more successful. "You May See Me Walkin'" got to number nine in the U.S., and reached number 16 in Canada, while "Cryin' My Heart Out Over You" and "I Don't Care" were both number one hits in the U.S. (while reaching number 3 & 2, respectively, in Canada).

The album itself went to number 2 on the country charts in the States and went gold. It was also his first time on the pop charts, where the album went to number 77.

== Track listing ==
1. "If That's the Way You Feel" (Ralph Stanley) (The Stanley Brothers cover) - 3:05
2. "Don't Get Above Your Raisin'" (Lester Flatt, Earl Scruggs) (Flatt & Scruggs cover) - 3:10
3. "Your Old Love Letters" (Johnny Bond) (Jim Reeves cover) - 3:38
4. "Low and Lonely" (Floyd Jenkins (aka Fred Rose)) (Roy Acuff cover) - 2:55
5. "Waitin' for the Sun to Shine" (Sonny Throckmorton) - 3:47
6. "You May See Me Walkin'" (Tom Uhr) - 2:28
7. "Crying My Heart Out Over You" (Carl Butler, Louise Certain Scruggs, Gladys Stacey Flatt, George Earl Sherry (aka Troy Martin)) (Flatt & Scruggs cover) - 3:00
8. "Lost to a Stranger" (Frank "Hylo" Brown, Jr.) (Hylo Brown cover) - 2:50
9. "I Don't Care" (Webb Pierce, Cindy Walker) (Webb Pierce cover) - 2:15
10. "So Round, So Firm, So Fully Packed" (Merle Travis, Eddie Kirk, Cliffie Stone) (Merle Travis cover) - 2:50

== Personnel ==
- Ricky Skaggs – vocals, acoustic guitar, mandolin (2, 10), electric rhythm guitar (4), backing vocals (4, 6, 7, 10)
- Buck White – acoustic piano (1–4, 7–10)
- Dennis Burnside – acoustic piano (5, 6), Rhodes electric piano (5)
- Ray Flacke – electric guitar
- Sonny Curtis – acoustic lead guitar (5)
- Bruce Bouton – steel guitar (1, 3–10)
- Jerry Douglas – dobro (2)
- Joe Osborn – bass
- Jerry Kroon – drums
- Bobby Hicks – fiddles (1, 3, 4, 7–10)
- Cheryl White Warren – vocals (1)
- Sharon White – vocals (1, 3, 9)
- Lea Jane Berinati – vocals (5)

== Production ==
- Ricky Skaggs – producer
- Marshall Morgan – engineer
- Pat McMakin – assistant engineer
- Virginia Team – art direction
- Beverly Parker – photography
- Chip Peay Enterprises – management

== Chart performance ==
Chart (1981)	Peak position
U.S. Billboard Top Country Albums	2
U.S. Billboard 200	77
