= You May See Me Walkin' =

Single by Ricky Skaggs

from the album Waitin' for the Sun to Shine
- B-side: "So Round, So Firm, So Fully Packed"
- Released: August 1981
- Genre: Country
- Length: 2:28
- Label: Epic
- Songwriter(s): Tom Uhr
- Producer(s): Ricky Skaggs

Ricky Skaggs singles chronology
"Don't Get Above Your Raisin'" (1981)	"You May See Me Walkin'" (1981)	"Crying My Heart Out Over You" (1982)

"You May See Me Walkin'" is a song written by Tom Uhr, and recorded by American country music artist Ricky Skaggs. It was released in August 1981 as the second single from the album Waitin' for the Sun to Shine. The song reached #9 on the Billboard Hot Country Singles chart.

== Chart performance ==
Chart (1981)	Peak position
US Hot Country Songs (Billboard)	9
Canadian RPM Country Tracks	16
