= Chris Austin =

American musician

- Born: Christopher Clay Austin; February 24, 1964; Boone, North Carolina, U.S.
- Died: March 16, 1991 (aged 27) San Diego, California, U.S.
- Genre: Country
- Occupation: Singer
- Instruments: Vocals; guitar; fiddle
- Years active: 1986–91
- Label: Warner Bros.
- Formerly of: Reba McEntire

Christopher Clay Austin (February 24, 1964 – March 16, 1991) was an American country music singer. Austin was signed to Warner Bros. Records in 1988 and charted three singles on the Billboard Hot Country Songs chart. His highest-charting single, "Blues Stay Away from Me," was included on the 1989 compilation album New Tradition Sings the Old Tradition. Austin also co-wrote Ricky Skaggs' 1991 single "Same Ol' Love."

Austin was most known for playing guitar and fiddle for Ricky Skaggs's and Reba McEntire's road bands. Austin toured with McEntire until an airplane carrying Austin, six other members of McEntire's band, and her road manager crashed into a nearby mountain after taking off from an airport in San Diego, California, killing all on board.

== Singles ==
Year	Single	Peak positions	Album
Year	Single	US Country	Album
1988	"Lonesome for You"	62	—N/a
1988	"I Know There's a Heart in There Somewhere"	89	—N/a
1989	"Blues Stay Away from Me"	54	New Tradition Sings the Old Tradition
1990	"Out of Step"	—	—N/a
"—" denotes releases that did not chart
