= Atlanta Pops Orchestra =

The Atlanta Pops Orchestra was established in 1945 by Albert Coleman. Coleman, a French immigrant, began working at WSB Radio in Atlanta, Georgia in 1944. At the time he saw a need to gather what he considered to be the best musicians to form the Atlanta Pops Orchestra. The orchestra was to play for radio dates, public concerts, and free performances to benefit the arts, the area youth, and aspiring musicians. The Atlanta Pops became known throughout the southeast as a result of concerts free to local audiences in Atlanta. Albert was inducted into the Georgia Music Hall of Fame for his contributions to both the orchestra and the multitude of young artists whose careers were assisted by him and for the diversity and longevity of his involvement in the arts in Georgia.

Following Albert Coleman's retirement in 1998 the orchestra performed under guest conductors for mainly private events. In 2002 the management was assumed by Altieri & Associates Entertainment, Inc. an Atlanta management, booking, and musical contracting company, which managed the organization through 2019. Former Atlanta Symphony principal trumpet John Head served as conductor and principal arranger for the Atlanta Pops from 2002 to 2010, leading the orchestra in performances throughout the metro Atlanta area and a three-week tour of Taiwan in 2004. Upon his retirement in 2010, Maestro Head was succeeded by Dr. Jason D. Altieri. In addition to his role as conductor and music director of the Atlanta Pops Orchestra, Jason is the associate conductor of the Reno Philharmonic and director of orchestras at the University of Nevada. He has made several national and international guest conducting appearances with the Hollywood Film Orchestra, New Sigmund Romberg Orchestra, Duluth Superior Symphony in Minnesota, Santa Fe Symphony, and the New Mexico Philharmonic.

Under Dr. Altieri, the Atlanta Pops Orchestra has broadened its original musical goals to include corporate events as well as school clinics and concerts, and entire community concert series. Musicians of the Atlanta Pops perform in Broadway shows visiting Atlanta and with other touring productions and celebrity shows, including Mannheim Steamroller, Celtic Woman, Johnny Mathis, and many others. The Atlanta Pops Orchestra continues to feature a diverse range of popular guest soloists and emerging talent in performances throughout the southeastern US.

== Discography ==
=== Albums ===
Year	Album	US Country	Label
1982	Just Hooked on Country	26	Epic
1983	Classic Country	70	Epic
2015	In The Spirit: A Celebration of the Holidays (with John Driskell Hopkins)		Brighter Shade
2018	Mountain Overture (with Balsam Range)		Mountain Home

=== Singles ===
Year	Single	US Country	Album
1982	"Just Hooked on Country (Parts I & II)"	42	Just Hooked on Country
1982	"Just Hooked on Country (Part III)"	77	Just Hooked on Country
