= Marc Pruett =

American bluegrass banjo player (born 1951)

- Born: 19 August 1951 (age 74)
- Genres: bluegrass
- Occupation: musician
- Instrument: banjo
- Spouse: Anita Pruett

Marc Pruett (born 19 August 1951) is an American bluegrass banjo player and a founding member of the bluegrass band Balsam Range since 2007.

== Early life and education ==
Pruett was born on 19 August 1951, and grew up in the Osborne Farm area of Haywood County, North Carolina. He graduated from Western Carolina University with a B.S. in Geology. At 15, his musical career started at Ghost Town, a theme park in Maggie Valley, North Carolina, where he played banjo and bass for park visitors.

== Career ==
In 1973, Pruett made his first recording at Bill Monroe's festival in Bean Blossom, Indiana. Between that time and the present, Pruett has played with a number of bands, including Balsam Range, the Southern Lawmen, The Whites, Rock Springs Reunion, mountain clogging bands, and more.

== Recognition ==
In 2010, he was granted an honorary Doctorate of Arts by Western Carolina University in Cullowhee, North Carolina "in recognition of [his] many achievements as a professional musician, and in appreciation for [his] support and love of the traditional culture of the Southern Appalachian Mountains".

Pruett is a 2016 winner of the North Carolina Heritage Award and has played with Ricky Skaggs, Balsam Range and the Marc Pruett Band

== Discography ==
- Streamline Cannonball (Skyline Records SR006, 1981) (Skyline Records SMR-005, 2006)
- The Clog Dancer's Answer (with Bo’s Bluegrass Band, Ricky Skaggs, and The Whites) (Skyline Records SR014, 1986)
