= Restless (Carl Perkins song) =

Single by Carl Perkins
- B-side: "11-43"
- Released: 1968
- Genre: Rockabilly
- Length: 2:45
- Label: Columbia
- Songwriter(s): Carl Perkins
- Producer(s): Bill Denny; Larry Butler

Carl Perkins singles chronology
""Shine, Shine, Shine"" (1967)	"Restless" (1968)	""Me Without You"" (1971)

"Restless" is a 1968 song written by Carl Perkins and released as a single on Columbia Records. In 1991, it was recorded by Mark O'Connor in collaboration with Vince Gill, Steve Wariner, and Ricky Skaggs under the credit Mark O'Connor and the New Nashville Cats.

== Background ==
The song was recorded on September 27, 1968, and released as a 45 single, 4-44723, on Columbia, in December, 1968, backed with "11-43", reaching no. 20 on the Billboard country chart. The recording, produced by Bill Denny and Larry Butler, also appeared on the May, 1969 Columbia LP Carl Perkins' Greatest Hits. The song also appeared on the 1992 Carl Perkins compilation album Restless: The Columbia Recordings. Carl Perkins performed the song on the Kraft Music Hall episode hosted by Johnny Cash on April 16, 1969.

== Notable recordings ==
George Thorogood and The Destroyers recorded the song on their 1980 studio album More George Thorogood and the Destroyers on Rounder Records. Emmylou Harris recorded the song for her 1982 live album Last Date.

== Mark O'Connor and the New Nashville Cats version ==
"Restless"

Single by Mark O'Connor and the New Nashville Cats

from the album The New Nashville Cats
- B-side: "Dance of the Ol' Swamp Rat"
- Released: 1991
- Genre: Country
- Length: 5:25
- Label: Warner
- Songwriter(s): Carl Perkins
- Producer(s): Mark O'Connor; Jim Ed Norman

Mark O'Connor singles chronology
"Restless" (1991)	"Now It Belongs to You" (1991)

Mark O'Connor had a Top 40 hit in 1991 in an all-star recording featuring Vince Gill, Ricky Skaggs, and Steve Wariner, collectively credited as "Mark O'Connor and the New Nashville Cats". This version reached no. 25 on the Billboard country chart in the U.S. and no. 19 on the Canadian country chart. The recording also won a Grammy Award for Best Country Collaboration with Vocals.
