= Larry Cordle =

American singer-songwriter

- Born: November 16, 1948 (age 77); Eastern Kentucky, U.S.
- Origin: United States
- Genres: Bluegrass; Country
- Occupations: Singer-songwriter musician
- Instruments: Guitar vocals
- Years active: 199x-present
- Labels: Sugar Hill, Shell Point, Lonesome Day
- Website: www.larrycordle.com

Larry Cordle (born November 16, 1948) is an American country and bluegrass singer-songwriter. Cordle is most famous for his song "Murder on Music Row", which was recorded by George Strait and Alan Jackson and received the Country Music Association Award for Vocal Event of the Year, and CMA nomination for Song of the Year, in 2000.

== Career ==
Cordle has written songs for Garth Brooks ("Alabama Clay" and "Against the Grain", the latter of which was also recorded by The Oak Ridge Boys), Mountain Heart ("Bitter Harvest"), Ricky Skaggs ("Callin' Your Name", "Highway 40 Blues", "Heartbreak Hurricane"), Loretta Lynn ("Country In My Genes"), George Strait ("Hollywood Squares"), Trisha Yearwood ("Lonesome Dove"), Kathy Mattea ("Lonesome Standard Time"), Diamond Rio ("Mama, Don't Forget To Pray For Me") and Bradley Walker ("When I'm Hurtin'") .

Cordle also has a career of his own, with his band Lonesome Standard Time. He founded the band in 1990 with his friend Glen Duncan. He received a Grammy nomination for the group's debut album, self-titled, in 1992. In 2005, Cordle's band played at the Gettysburg Bluegrass Festival. On his album 2007 "Took Up and Put Down", he sings "The First Train Robbery"; a song about the Reno Gang written from brother William Reno's perspective. The Song was written by Chris Stuart

Cordle performed on two bluegrass tribute albums for the British rock band the Moody Blues: Moody Bluegrass: A Nashville Tribute to the Moody Blues (2004), and Moody Bluegrass TWO... Much Love (2011).

Along with friends Carl Jackson and Jerry Salley, the trio (Cordle, Jackson & Salley) recorded the song "You’re Running Wild" on the Louvin Brothers tribute on Universal South Records, which features numerous country music stars singing songs made famous by the legendary duo. Entitled Livin', Lovin', Losin': Songs of the Louvin Brothers, this project won the 2004 Grammy for Country Album of the Year. The trio tours across the country and performs the hits they wrote for others.

== Discography ==
=== Larry Cordle & Lonesome Standard Time ===
- Larry Cordle, Glen Duncan & Lonesome Standard Time, Sugar Hill Records (1992)
- Murder on Music Row, Shell Point Records (2000)
- Songs from the Workbench, Shell Point Records (2003)
- Lonesome Skynyrd Time: A Bluegrass Tribute to Lynyrd Skynyrd, CMH Records (2004)
- All-Star Duets, MightyCord Records (2014)

=== Solo ===
- Took Down and Put Up (2007)
- Pud Marcum's Hangin', MightyCord Records (2011)
- Give Me Jesus, MightyCord Records (2017)
- Tales From East Kentucky (2018)
- Where the Trees Know My Name, MightyCord Records (2021)
