= Kentucky Thunder =

Band that plays with Ricky Skaggs

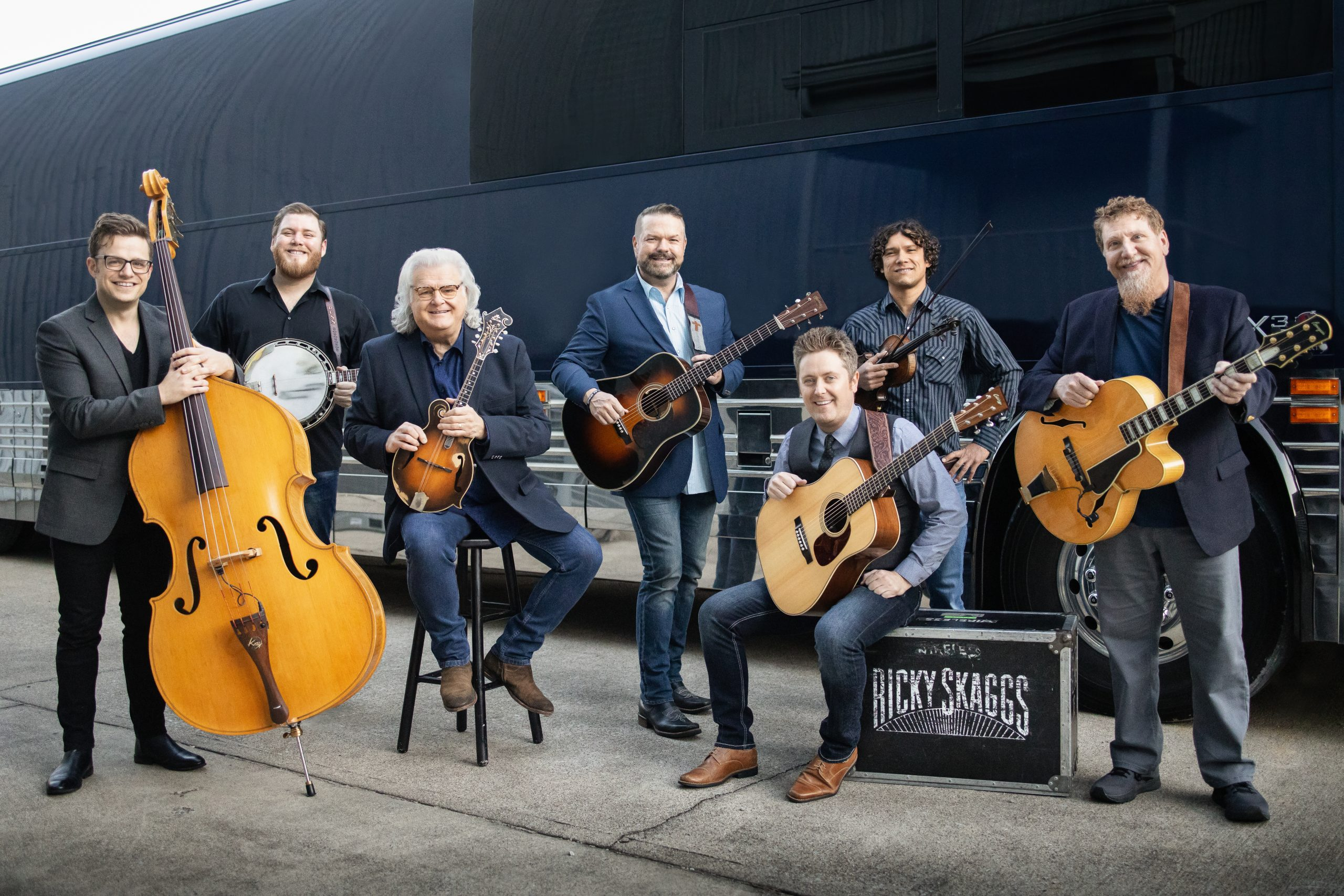
- Ricky Skaggs and Kentucky Thunder in Mt Vernon, KY on October 21, 2022.

Background information
- Origin: Kentucky, United States
- Genres: Bluegrass
- Years active: 1997-present
- Labels: Rounder, Sugar Hill, Hollywood, RCA, Skaggs Family Records
- Website: https://rickyskaggs.com/kentucky-thunder/

Kentucky Thunder, or Ricky Skaggs and Kentucky Thunder, is the band that plays with American country and bluegrass singer Ricky Skaggs. Many members of the band have won numerous awards. Bandleader Ricky Skaggs plays mandolin and is the lead vocalist. The group has won the Instrumental Group of the Year award from the International Bluegrass Music Association multiple times, as well as seven Grammy Awards.

== Lineup ==
The current lineup serving under Ricky is:

- Russell Carson - Banjo (since 2014)
- Justus Ross - Lead Guitar (since 2024)
- Troy Engle - Rhythm Guitar, Baritone Vocals (since 2025)
- Mike Rogers - Guitar and Tenor Vocals (since 2021)
- Billy Contreras - Fiddle (since 2021)
- Gavin Kelso - Upright Bass (since 2022)

=== Lineups ===
1997	1997–1999	1999–2001
Ricky Skaggs – mandolin, lead vocals; Paul Brewster – guitar, tenor vocals; Bobby Hicks – fiddle; Marc Pruett – banjo; Bryan Sutton – lead guitar; Mark Fain – bass; Gary "Bud" Smith – piano	Ricky Skaggs – mandolin, lead vocals; Paul Brewster – guitar, tenor vocals; Jim Mills – banjo; Bryan Sutton – lead guitar; Bobby Hicks – fiddle; Mark Fain – bass	Ricky Skaggs – mandolin, lead vocals; Paul Brewster – guitar, tenor vocals; Darrin Vincent – Dobro, baritone vocals; Jim Mills – banjo; Bobby Hicks – fiddle; Luke Bella – fiddle; Clay Hess – lead guitar; Mark Fain – bass
2001–2004	2004–2007	2007–2008
Ricky Skaggs – mandolin, lead vocals; Paul Brewster – guitar, tenor vocals; Darrin Vincent – Dobro, baritone vocals; Cody Kilby – lead guitar; Jim Mills – banjo; Bobby Hicks – fiddle; Andy Leftwich – fiddle; Mark Fain – bass	Ricky Skaggs – mandolin, lead vocals; Paul Brewster – guitar, tenor vocals; Darrin Vincent – Dobro, baritone vocals; Cody Kilby – lead guitar; Jim Mills – banjo; Andy Leftwich – fiddle; Mark Fain – bass	Ricky Skaggs – mandolin, lead vocals; Paul Brewster – guitar, tenor vocals; Darrin Vincent – Dobro, baritone vocals; Cody Kilby – lead guitar; Ben Helson – guitar; Jim Mills – banjo; Andy Leftwich – fiddle; Mark Fain – bass
2008–2010	2010–2012	2012–2014
Ricky Skaggs – mandolin, lead vocals; Paul Brewster – guitar, tenor vocals; Edie Faris – Dobro, baritone vocals; Cody Kilby – lead guitar; Jim Mills – banjo; Andy Leftwich – fiddle; Mark Fain – bass	Ricky Skaggs – mandolin, lead vocals; Paul Brewster – guitar, tenor vocals; Edie Faris – Dobro, baritone vocals; Cody Kilby – lead guitar; Justin Moses – banjo; Andy Leftwich – fiddle; Mark Fain – bass	Ricky Skaggs – mandolin, lead vocals; Paul Brewster – guitar, tenor vocals; Edie Faris – Dobro, baritone vocals; Cody Kilby – lead guitar; Justin Moses – banjo; Andy Leftwich – fiddle; Scott Mulvahill – bass
2014–2016	2016–2017	2017–2018
Ricky Skaggs – mandolin, lead vocals; Paul Brewster – guitar, tenor vocals; Edie Faris – Dobro, baritone vocals; Cody Kilby – lead guitar; Russell Carson – banjo; Andy Leftwich – fiddle; Scott Mulvahill – bass	Ricky Skaggs – mandolin, lead vocals; Paul Brewster – guitar, tenor vocals; Edie Faris – Dobro, baritone vocals; Jake Workman – lead guitar; Russell Carson – banjo; Mike Barnett – fiddle; Scott Mulvahill – bass	Ricky Skaggs – mandolin, lead vocals; Paul Brewster – guitar, tenor vocals; Edie Faris – Dobro, baritone vocals; Jake Workman – lead guitar; Russell Carson – banjo; Mike Barnett – fiddle; Jeff Picker – bass
2018–2021	2021–2022	2022–2024
Ricky Skaggs – mandolin, lead vocals; Paul Brewster – guitar, tenor vocals; Dennis Parker – rhythm guitar, baritone vocals; Jake Workman – lead guitar; Russell Carson – banjo; Mike Barnett – fiddle; Jeff Picker – bass	Ricky Skaggs – mandolin, lead vocals; Mike Rogers – guitar, tenor vocals; Dennis Parker – rhythm guitar, baritone vocals; Jake Workman – lead guitar; Russell Carson – banjo; Billy Contreras – fiddle; Jeff Picker – bass	Ricky Skaggs – mandolin, lead vocals; Mike Rogers – guitar, tenor vocals; Dennis Parker – rhythm guitar, baritone vocals; Jake Workman – lead guitar; Russell Carson – banjo; Billy Contreras – fiddle; Gavin Kelso – bass
2024–2025	2025–present
Ricky Skaggs – mandolin, lead vocals; Mike Rogers – guitar, tenor vocals; Dennis Parker – rhythm guitar, baritone vocals; Justus Ross – lead guitar; Russell Carson – banjo; Billy Contreras – fiddle; Gavin Kelso – bass	Ricky Skaggs – mandolin, lead vocals; Mike Rogers – guitar, tenor vocals; Troy Engle – rhythm guitar, baritone vocals; Justus Ross – lead guitar; Russell Carson – banjo; Billy Contreras – fiddle; Gavin Kelso – bass

== Discography ==
Title	Album details	Peak chart positions		
Title	Album details	US Grass	US Country	US
Bluegrass Rules!	Release date: October 21, 1997; Label: Rounder Records	—	45	—
Ancient Tones	Release date: January 26, 1999; Label: Skaggs Family Records	—	46	—
Soldier of the Cross	Release date: September 14, 1999; Label: Skaggs Family Records	—	65	—
History of the Future	Release date: September 11, 2001; Label: Skaggs Family Records	10	35	—
Live at the Charleston Music Hall	Release date: March 25, 2003; Label: Skaggs Family Records	2	32	—
Brand New Strings	Release date: September 28, 2004; Label: Skaggs Family Records	1	60	—
Instrumentals	Release date: August 1, 2006; Label: Skaggs Family Records	1	73	—
Honoring the Fathers of Bluegrass: Tribute to 1946 and 1947	Release date: March 25, 2008; Label: Skaggs Family Records	1	29	191
Music to My Ears	Release date: September 25, 2012; Label: Skaggs Family Records	2	52	—
"—" denotes releases that did not chart

Guest artists on The Chieftains' Down the Old Plank Road: The Nashville Sessions (2002)

== Awards ==
=== Grammy awards ===
- 1998 Best Bluegrass Album: Ricky Skaggs and Kentucky Thunder for Bluegrass Rules!
- 1999 Best Bluegrass Album: Ricky Skaggs and Kentucky Thunder for Ancient Tones
- 2000 Best Southern, Country, or Bluegrass Gospel Album: Ricky Skaggs and Kentucky Thunder for Soldier Of The Cross
- 2003 Best Country Performance By A Duo or Group With Vocal: Ricky Skaggs and Kentucky Thunder for A Simple Life
- 2004 Best Bluegrass Album: Ricky Skaggs and Kentucky Thunder for Brand New Strings
- 2006 Best Bluegrass Album: Ricky Skaggs and Kentucky Thunder for Instrumentals
- 2008 Best Bluegrass Album: Ricky Skaggs and Kentucky Thunder for Honoring the Fathers of Bluegrass: Tribute to 1946 & 1947

=== IBMA (International Bluegrass Music Association) Awards ===
- 1998 Instrumental Group Of The Year: Ricky Skaggs & Kentucky Thunder
- 1998 Album Of The Year: Ricky Skaggs & Kentucky Thunder for Bluegrass Rules!
- 1999 Instrumental Group Of The Year: Ricky Skaggs & Kentucky Thunder
- 2000 Instrumental Group Of The Year: Ricky Skaggs & Kentucky Thunder
- 2002 Instrumental Group Of The Year: Ricky Skaggs & Kentucky Thunder
- 2003 Instrumental Group Of The Year: Ricky Skaggs & Kentucky Thunder
- 2004 Instrumental Group Of The Year: Ricky Skaggs & Kentucky Thunder
- 2005 Instrumental Group Of The Year: Ricky Skaggs & Kentucky Thunder
- 2006 Instrumental Group Of The Year: Ricky Skaggs & Kentucky Thunder
