= Jim Mills (banjo player) =

American musician (1966–2024)

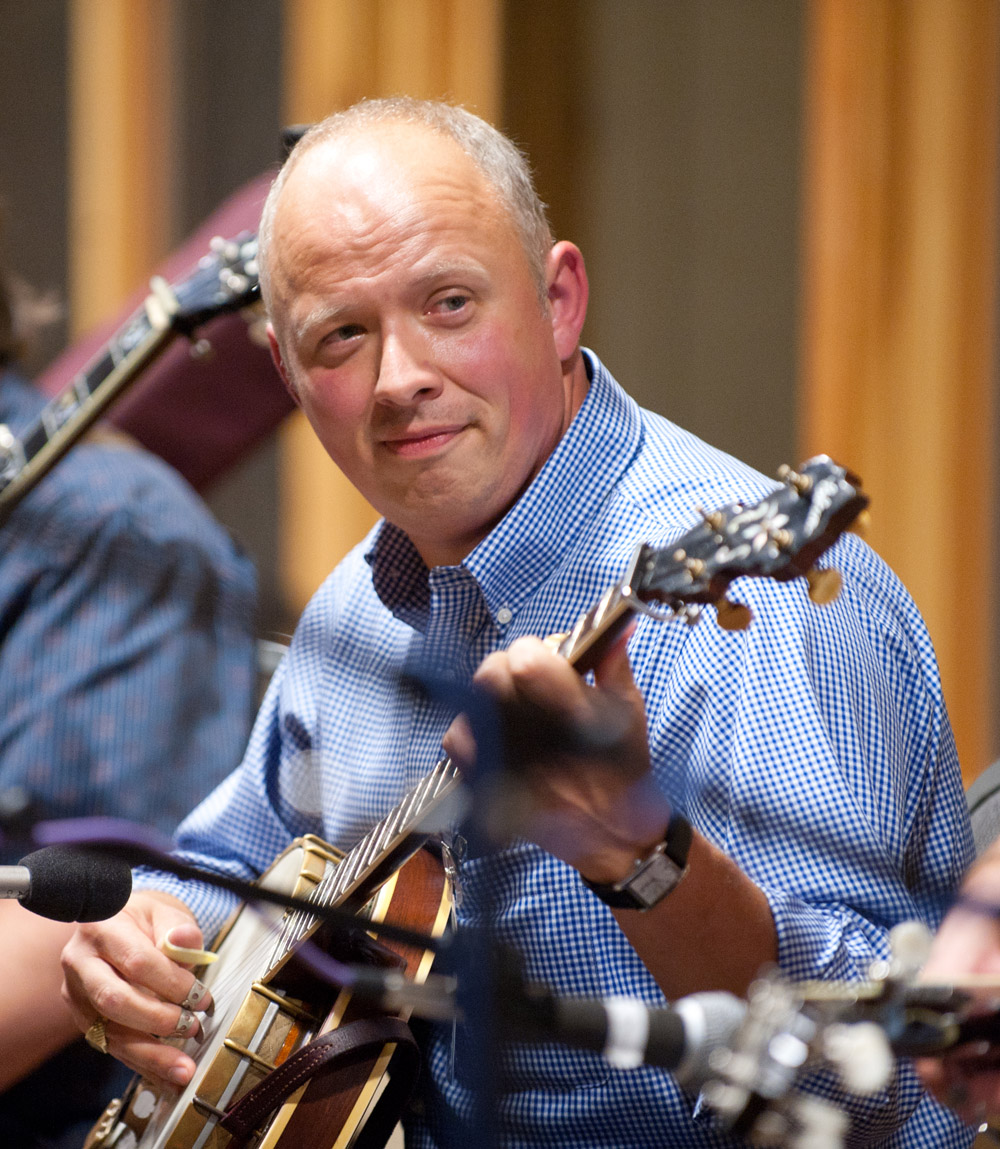
Mills at NashCamp 2011

James Robert Mills (December 18, 1966 – May 3, 2024) was an American musician known primarily as a bluegrass banjo player who played in the three-finger style popularized by Earl Scruggs. Mills was also well known as an expert on pre-war Gibson banjos. He resided in Durham, North Carolina.

Mills worked as the banjo player for Ricky Skaggs and Kentucky Thunder for 14 years until the summer of 2010, when he left the band to focus on his business buying, selling and trading rare pre-war banjos. In the 1980s, prior to his stint with Skaggs, Mills performed for five years with Doyle Lawson & Quicksilver. He has three solo albums and has performed on many others. He has won the IBMA banjo player of the year award six times (1999, 2000, 2001, 2003, 2005, 2006), more than any other player, and also won IBMA Instrumental Album of the Year for his Bound to Ride album. Mills has won six Grammy Awards.

Mills owned several pre-war Gibson Mastertone banjos, including the famous "Mack Crow" banjo (named after its original owner, it is the only factory-produced gold-plated RB-75 that Gibson ever made) and the RB-4 previously owned by the late Snuffy Jenkins. Huber Banjos produced a Jim Mills signature model based on the Mack Crow. Mills released a book on pre-war Gibson banjos in 2009, Gibson Mastertones: Flathead 5-String Banjos of the 1930s and 1940s.

Mills died from a heart attack on May 3, 2024, at the age of 57.

== Selected discography ==
Solo albums:

- (1998) Bound to Ride
- (2002) My Dixie Home
- (2005) Hide Head Blues

Also performed on:

- (1987) Can't Stop Now (Summer Wages)
- (1989) I Heard the Angels Singing (Doyle Lawson and Quicksilver)
- (1990) My Heart is Yours (Doyle Lawson and Quicksilver)
- (1992) Pressing on Regardless (Doyle Lawson)
- (1992) Treasures Money Can't Buy (Doyle Lawson and Quicksilver)
- (1994) Love of a Woman (Bass Mountain Boys)
- (1998) Southern Flavor (James Price)
- (1999) Ancient Tones (Ricky Skaggs)
- (1999) Grass is Blue (Dolly Parton)
- (1999) Soldier of the Cross (Ricky Skaggs)
- (2000) Carry Me Across the Mountain (Dan Tyminski)
- (2000) In the Blue Room (Alan Bibey)
- (2001) History of the Future (Ricky Skaggs & Kentucky Thunder)
- (2001) Little Sparrow (Dolly Parton)
- (2002) Ricky Skaggs Sings the Songs of Bill Monroe (Ricky Skaggs)
- (2002) Where I Come From (Bobby Osborne)
- (2003) Live at the Charleston Music Hall (Ricky Skaggs)
- (2003) The Three Pickers (Earl Scruggs, Doc Watson, & Ricky Skaggs)
- (2004) Brand New Strings (Ricky Skaggs & Kentucky Thunder)
- (2004) School of Bluegrass (Doyle Lawson)
- (2005) Skaggs Family Christmas (Ricky Skaggs)
- (2006) Instrumentals (Ricky Skaggs)
- (2007) Ricky Skaggs and Bruce Hornsby (Ricky Skaggs)
- (2008) Honoring the Fathers of Bluegrass: Tribute to 1946 & 1947 (Ricky Skaggs)
