= Ricky Skaggs =

American country and bluegrass singer, musician and composer (born 1954)

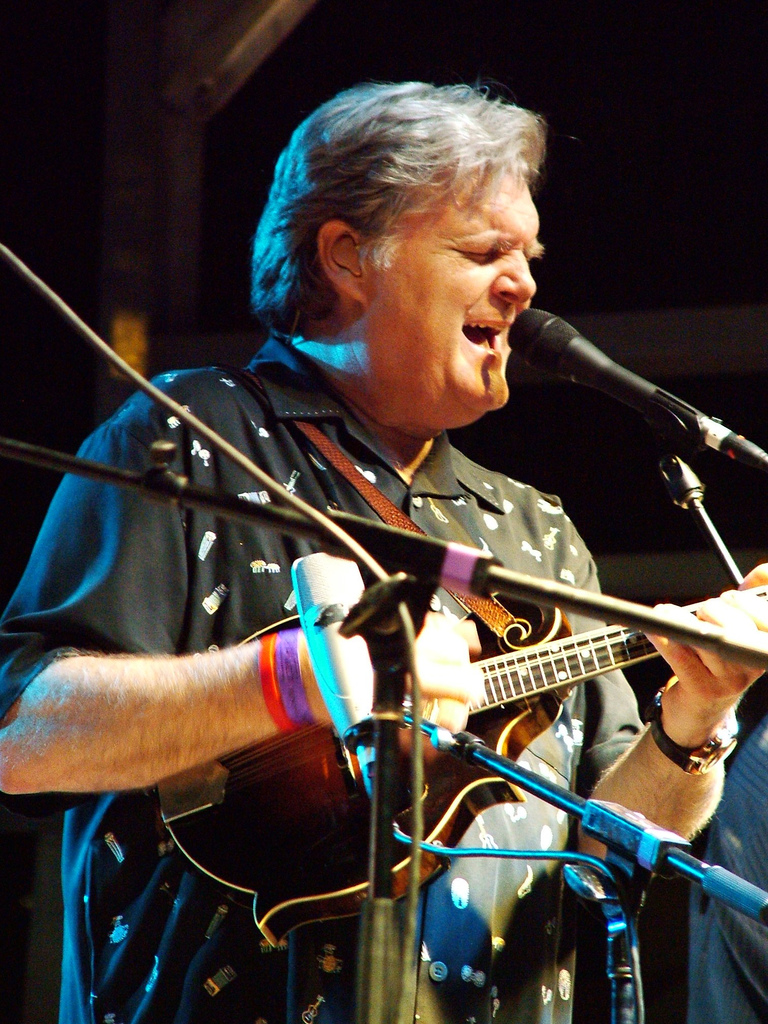
- Skaggs during the Festival of Faiths in 2007

Background information
- Born: Rickie Lee Skaggs; July 18, 1954 (age 72); Cordell, Kentucky, U.S.
- Genres: Bluegrass; neotraditionalist country; gospel; folk
- Occupations: Singer, session musician, bandleader, producer, arranger
- Instruments: Vocals, mandolin, guitar, banjo, fiddle
- Years active: 1961–present
- Labels: Sugar Hill, Epic, Rounder, DCC, Atlantic, Camden, Rebel, Hollywood, Legacy, Skaggs Family
- Member of: Kentucky Thunder
- Spouse: Sharon White (m. 1981)
- Website: www.rickyskaggs.com

Rickie Lee Skaggs (born July 18, 1954), known professionally as Ricky Skaggs, is an American neotraditional country and bluegrass singer, musician, producer, and composer. He primarily plays mandolin, but he also plays fiddle, guitar, and banjo.

Skaggs was inducted into the Musicians Hall of Fame and Museum in 2016 and both the International Bluegrass Music Hall of Fame and the Country Music Hall of Fame in 2018. On January 13, 2021, Skaggs was announced to have been awarded the National Medal of Arts by President Donald Trump, alongside fellow country musician Toby Keith.

== Biography ==
=== Early career ===
Skaggs was born in Cordell, Kentucky to Hobart Skaggs and Dorothy Mae Thompson Skaggs. He started playing music at age five after he was given a mandolin by his father. At age six, he played mandolin and sang on stage with Bill Monroe. At age seven, he appeared on television's Martha White country music variety show, playing with Lester Flatt and Earl Scruggs. He also wanted to audition for the Grand Ole Opry at that time, but was told he was too young.

In his mid-teens, Skaggs met a fellow teen guitarist, Keith Whitley, and the two started playing together with Whitley's banjo-playing brother, Dwight, on radio shows. By 1970, they had earned a spot opening for Ralph Stanley, and Skaggs and Keith Whitley were thereafter invited to join Stanley's band, the Clinch Mountain Boys.

Skaggs later joined the Country Gentlemen in Washington, DC, and J. D. Crowe's New South from Lexington, Kentucky. In 1976, Skaggs formed progressive bluegrass band Boone Creek, including members Vince Gill and Jerry Douglas. For a few years, Skaggs was a member of Emmylou Harris's Hot Band. He wrote the arrangements for Harris's 1980 bluegrass-roots album, Roses in the Snow. In addition to arranging for Harris, Skaggs sang harmony and played mandolin and fiddle in the Hot Band.

== Country career ==
Skaggs launched his own career in 1980, achieving 12 number-one hits, 8 CMA awards, and eight Academy of Country Music awards. In 1982, he became a member of the Grand Ole Opry, the youngest musician ever to be inducted at that time. Guitarist and producer Chet Atkins credited Skaggs with "single-handedly" saving country music. Skaggs is considered one of the pioneers of the neotraditional country subgenre.

In 1981, he debuted on Epic Records with the album Waitin for the Sun to Shine, which brought him to both the country and pop charts and produced two number-one hits.

In 1982, he released Highways and Heartaches, his only platinum album, featuring the instrumental-heavy "Highway 40 Blues".

Keeping with his instrumental heavy themes, he released "Country Boy" on the album of the same name. He also had Bill Monroe as a guest on this album.

Exploring a role as producer, Skaggs produced Dolly Parton's album White Limozeen, which started her comeback in country music.

Skaggs also guest-performed on other albums. In 1995, he sang with Vince Gill on "Go Rest High on That Mountain", which later won CMA's Song of the Year and was determined by BMI to be the Most-Performed Song in 1997.

== Later career ==
In 1996, Skaggs went back to his bluegrass roots, and also experimented with new sounds. With his band, Kentucky Thunder, he is a perennial winner of Grammy Awards and International Bluegrass Music Association for best bluegrass album.

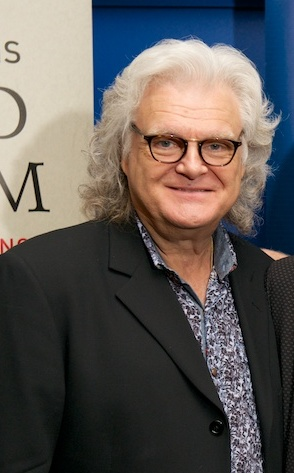
Ricky Skaggs in May 2016

In 2000, he shared the stage with Vermont-based jam band, Phish. On March 20, 2007, Skaggs released an album with rock musician Bruce Hornsby.

In 2008, Skaggs released an album he recorded with the Whites on his Skaggs Family Records label.

In 2008, Skaggs recorded a bluegrass version of "Old Enough" by the Raconteurs with Ashley Monroe and the Raconteurs. He played the mandolin on the track and shared vocals with Jack White, Brendan Benson, and Ashley Monroe.

In 2011, Skaggs, along with other musicians including the Irish band the Brock McGuire Band, released their album Green Grass Blue Grass, an exploration of the connection between Irish traditional music and American bluegrass and Appalachian music.

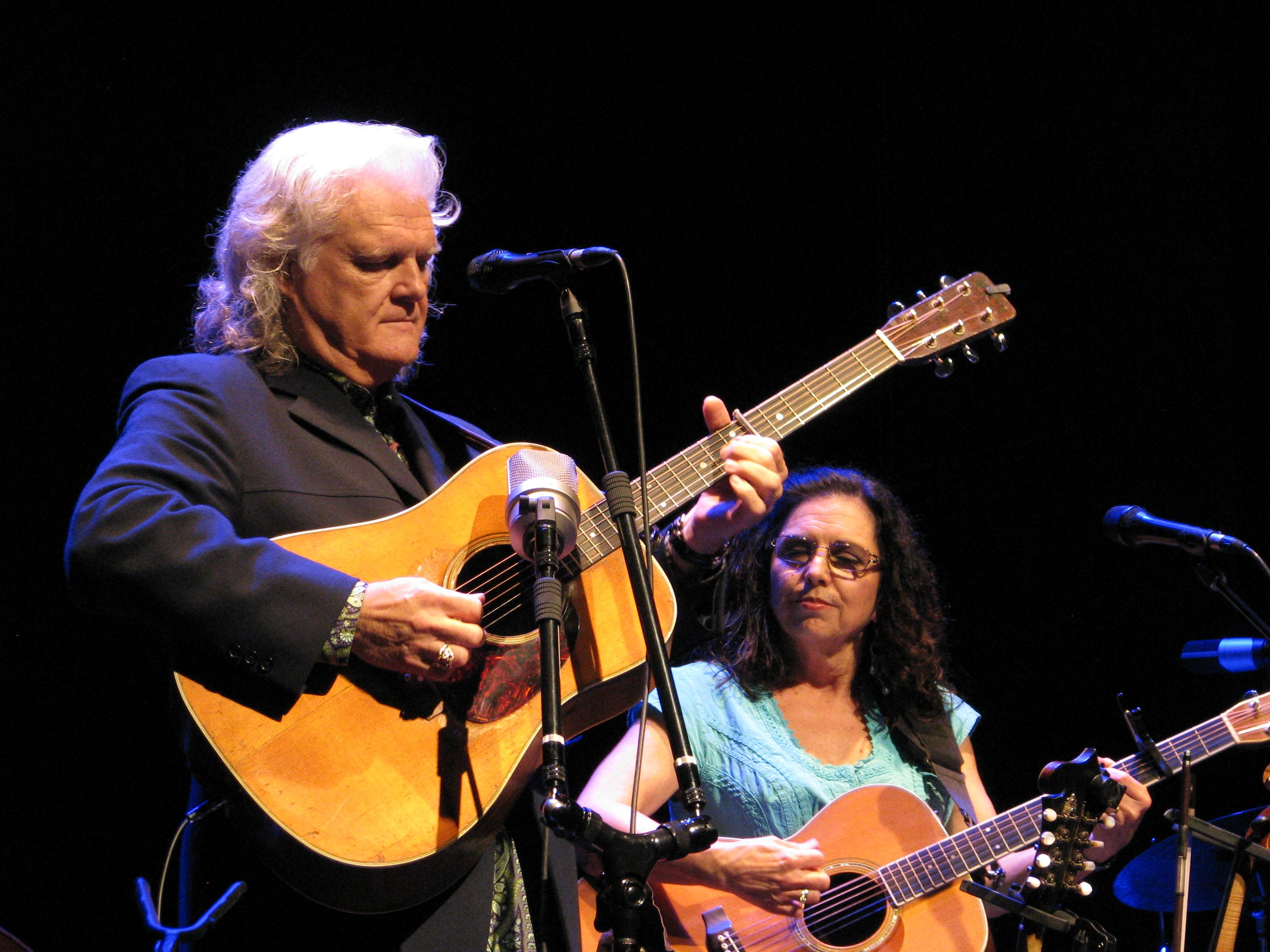
Ricky Skaggs and Sharon White, McGlohon Theater, Charlotte, NC, August 19, 2015

Also in 2011, Skaggs contributed to Moody Bluegrass TWO...Much Love, a bluegrass tribute album to British progressive rock band the Moody Blues. Skaggs sang lead vocal on the song "You and Me".

In 2012, Skaggs collaborated with Barry Gibb on the song, "Soldier's Son", which was released on Music to My Ears.

In 2015, Skaggs toured with Ry Cooder, Sharon White and other members of The Whites.

In 2016, he produced the Grammy-winning album Love Remains for Lady Antebellum member Hillary Scott.

In 2019, he collaborated with Steven Curtis Chapman for Chapman's album Deeper Roots: Where the Bluegrass Grows

In 2019, Skaggs performed at the 6th Musicians Hall of Fame and Museum Concert and Induction Ceremony.

As of recent years, Skaggs continues performing at the historic Grand Ole Opry house in Nashville, Tennessee.

In 2021, Skaggs was nominated for the SOTE award. which was delayed by the COVID pandemic.

== Personal life ==
Ricky Skaggs was previously married to Brenda Stanley and has two children, Andrew and Mandy, from that marriage. Skaggs has been married to Sharon White of the Whites since August 1981. Their children are a daughter, Molly, and a son, Lucas. Molly Skaggs is a Christian/Gospel singer. Lucas is a multi-instrumentalist and session musician.

In June 2020, Skaggs underwent quadruple bypass surgery in Nashville.

Skaggs in 2021 was awarded the National Medal of the Arts by President Donald Trump.

== Awards ==
=== Grammy Awards ===
- 1983 Best Country Instrumental Performance: New South (J.D. Crowe, Jerry Douglas, Todd Phillips, Tony Rice, Ricky Skaggs) for Fireball
- 1984 Best Country Instrumental Performance: Ricky Skaggs for Wheel Hoss
- 1986 Best Country Instrumental Performance (Orchestra, Group or Soloist): Ricky Skaggs for Raisin' The Dickens
- 1991 Best Country Vocal Collaboration: Ricky Skaggs, Steve Wariner & Vince Gill for Restless
- 1998 Best Bluegrass Album: Ricky Skaggs and Kentucky Thunder for Bluegrass Rules!
- 1998 Best Country Collaboration with Vocals: Clint Black, Joe Diffie, Merle Haggard, Emmylou Harris, Alison Krauss, Patty Loveless, Earl Scruggs, Ricky Skaggs, Marty Stuart, Pam Tillis, Randy Travis, Travis Tritt & Dwight Yoakam for Same Old Train
- 1999 Best Bluegrass Album: Ricky Skaggs and Kentucky Thunder for Ancient Tones
- 2000 Best Southern, Country, or Bluegrass Gospel Album: Ricky Skaggs and Kentucky Thunder for Soldier Of The Cross
- 2003 Best Country Performance By A Duo or Group With Vocal: Ricky Skaggs and Kentucky Thunder for A Simple Life
- 2004 Best Bluegrass Album: Ricky Skaggs and Kentucky Thunder for Brand New Strings
- 2005 Best Musical Album For Children, "Songs From The Neighborhood, The Music Of Mr. Rogers"
- 2006 Best Bluegrass Album: Ricky Skaggs and Kentucky Thunder for Instrumentals
- 2008 Best Southern, Country, or Bluegrass Gospel Album: Ricky Skaggs and The Whites for Salt of the Earth
- 2009 Best Bluegrass Album Honoring The Fathers Of Bluegrass 1946 & 47
- 2016 Best Contemporary Christian Music Album (as producer for Love Remains by Hillary Scott & The Scott Family )

=== CMA (Country Music Association) Awards ===
- 1982 Male Vocalist of the Year: Ricky Skaggs
- 1982 Horizon Award: Ricky Skaggs
- 1983 Instrumental Group of the Year: Ricky Skaggs Band
- 1984 Instrumental Group of the Year: Ricky Skaggs Band
- 1985 Entertainer of the Year: Ricky Skaggs
- 1985 Instrumental Group of the Year: Ricky Skaggs Band
- 1987 Vocal Duo of the Year: Ricky Skaggs & Sharon White
- 1991 Vocal Event of the Year (with Mark O'Connor & New Nashville Cats)

=== ACM (Academy of Country Music) Awards ===
- 1981 Top New Male Vocalist of the Year: Ricky Skaggs
- 1982 Band of the Year – Touring: Ricky Skaggs Band
- 1983 Band of the Year – Touring: Ricky Skaggs Band
- 1984 Band of the Year – Touring: Ricky Skaggs Band
- 1984 Specialty Instrument: Ricky Skaggs (Mandolin)
- 1985 Band of the Year – Touring: Ricky Skaggs Band
- 1986 Band of the Year – Touring: Ricky Skaggs Band
- 1987 Specialty Instrument: Ricky Skaggs

=== IBMA (International Bluegrass Music Association) Awards ===
- 1998 Instrumental Group of the Year: Ricky Skaggs & Kentucky Thunder
- 1998 Album Of The Year: Ricky Skaggs & Kentucky Thunder for Bluegrass Rules!
- 1999 Instrumental Group Of The Year: Ricky Skaggs & Kentucky Thunder
- 2000 Instrumental Group Of The Year: Ricky Skaggs & Kentucky Thunder
- 2000 Instrumental Album Of The Year: David Grisman, Ronnie McCoury, Sam Bush, Frank Wakefield, Bobby Osborne, Jesse McReynolds, Ricky Skaggs & Buck White for Bluegrass Mandolin Extravaganza
- 2000 Recorded Event of the Year: David Grisman, Ronnie McCoury, Frank Wakefield, Sam Bush, Bobby Osborne, Jesse McReynolds, Ricky Skaggs & Buck White for Bluegrass Mandolin Extravaganza
- 2002 Instrumental Group Of The Year: Ricky Skaggs & Kentucky Thunder
- 2003 Instrumental Group Of The Year: Ricky Skaggs & Kentucky Thunder
- 2004 Instrumental Group Of The Year: Ricky Skaggs & Kentucky Thunder
- 2005 Instrumental Group Of The Year: Ricky Skaggs & Kentucky Thunder
- 2006 Instrumental Group Of The Year: Ricky Skaggs & Kentucky Thunder
- 2008 Recorded Event of the Year: Everett Lilly & Everybody and Their Brother; Featuring Everett Lilly, Bea Lilly, Charles Lilly, Daniel Lilly, Mark Lilly, Marty Stuart, Rhonda Vincent, Billy Walker, Ronnie McCoury, Rob McCoury, David Ball, Charlie Cushman, Larry Stephenson, Joe Spivey, Eddie Stubbs, Jason Carter, Dickey Lee, Freddy Weller, Mike Bub, Rad Lewis, Andy May, Darrin Vincent, Marcia Campbell, Clay Rigdon, Eric Blankenship and Bill Wolfenbarger (artists); Charles Lilly & Bill Wolfenbarger (producers); Swift River Music
- 2012 Gospel Recorded Performance of the Year: "Singing as We Rise", Gibson Brothers with Ricky Skaggs
- 2017 Gospel Recorded Performance of the Year for song "Sacred Memories", Joe Mullins & the Radio Ramblers with Ricky Skaggs and Sharon White Skaggs
- 2018 International Bluegrass Music Hall of Fame inductee

=== TNN/Music City News Country Awards ===
- 1982 Bluegrass Act of the Year
- 1983 Bluegrass Act of the Year
- 1983 Star of Tomorrow
- 1984 Bluegrass Act of the Year
- 1988 Instrumentalist of the Year
- 1989 Instrumentalist of the Year
- 1990 Instrumentalist of the Year
- 1996 Vocal Collaboration of the Year (with Vince Gill & Patty Loveless)

=== Other awards and accomplishments ===
- National Medal of Arts, awarded by President Donald Trump in 2021
- Inducted into the Country Music Hall of Fame on March 27, 2018, in the Modern Era category
- Kentucky Music Hall of Fame, Class of 2004
- R&R Best New Artist
- Billboard magazine's Artist of the Year
- Musician Magazine- Voted One of the Top 100 Guitarists of the Century
- Artist of the Decade- Listeners' Poll Award BBC Radio 2
- CMT's 40 Greatest Men of Country Music rank No. 37 in 2003.
- Judge for the 2nd annual Independent Music Awards
- ACM's Cliffie Stone Pioneer Award, 2012
- Gospel Music Hall of Fame inductee, 2012
- Bluegrass Star Award, presented by the Bluegrass Heritage Foundation of Dallas, Texas (2017).
- Honorary Doctorate of Humanities from Eastern Kentucky University – 2005
- Honorary Doctorate of Music from Berklee College of Music – received in March 2008
- Plaque on Nashville's StarWalk, 1987
