= Ali Siddiq: It's Bigger Than These Bars =

- Genre: Stand-up comedy
- Written by: Ali Siddiq
- Directed by: Chioke Nassor
- Starring: Ali Siddiq
- Composer: Timothy Bright
- Country of origin: United States
- Original language: English

Production
- Executive producers: Ali Siddiq; Chioke Nassor; Stuart Miller
- Cinematography: Tyler Ribble
- Editor: Kelly Lyon
- Camera setup: Multi-camera
- Running time: 42 minutes
- Production companies: Comedy Partners; What's Funny! LLC

Original release
- Network: Comedy Central
- Release: February 23, 2018

It's Bigger Than These Bars is a 2018 American stand-up comedy television special starring Ali Siddiq. It was directed by Chioke Nassor and premiered on Comedy Central on February 23, 2018. The special was filmed at Bell County Jail in Belton, Texas in September 2017. It is the first televised special shot inside a jail hosted by and starring a performer who is a former prisoner. In May 2018, it was shortlisted for a Primetime Emmy Award for Outstanding Variety Special (Pre-Recorded) but failed to be nominated.

== Background ==
Houston comic Ali Siddiq began consistently telling jokes about his experience being incarcerated starting with his performance on the Comedy Central television series This Is Not Happening on the second episode of its first season which aired on January 26, 2015. Ever since then it had been his goal to perform to an audience in prison and "to make a bigger impact." On October 21, 1991, four days after turning 19-years-old, Siddiq had been arrested with five kilograms of cocaine and subsequently sentenced to 15-years for "delivery of a controlled substance." He was released on October 21, 1997, after serving six years in state prison, primarily at Darrington Unit in Rosharon, Torres Unit in Hondo, Bill Clements Unit in Amarillo and Ellis Unit in Huntsville, and spent the remainder of his sentence on parole, beginning his journey to a career in stand-up comedy in December 1997.

He wanted to shoot the special at a Texas state prison but was denied permission. Comedy Central approached Bell County Jail who initially hesitated before accepting the proposal. Siddiq commented, "It's a weird thing about Texas—to be one of the largest prison systems and they don't want anybody to come in and show the public what’s going on or even talk about it. Actually, their reason for not letting me in was they didn't want me saying anything negative about the prison. And I was like, 'I think that the word "prison" alone covers that.'"

Inmates who maintained good behavior and kept their jail cells clean became eligible to attend the show, and vying for that privilege began months in advance. While visiting the jail in July 2017 "Siddiq went from cell to cell and didn’t tell a single joke. Instead, he talked to the inmates and mentored to them. He also made the staff think 'outside the box,'" reported Captain Byron Shelton, the Jail Administrator at Bell County Sheriff's Office, during a press conference on February 8, 2018. "Having Comedy Central at the Bell County Jail will help people who watch the show see it for the clean facility that it is and they'll be able to observe the overall atmosphere," added Bell County Sheriff Eddy Lange. Siddiq hosted a Q&A from the jail with Shelton on Facebook Live in the afternoon of February 23 to promote the television special airing later that night.

It's not supposed to have such a high recidivism rate. Being in prison is supposed to be an accident, a mistake that you've committed, and the system is supposed to help you move past it [...] That's why it's called a "correctional facility." At some point, I think they stopped correcting people and just became a facility.

— Ali Siddiq, Uproxx, February 23, 2018.

== Synopsis ==
The special begins by comically depicting Ali Siddiq being arrested and taken to jail by sheriffs. It then consists of him performing stand-up comedy and is periodically interlaced with cutaway scenes of him sharing conversations and jokes with officials and with male and female inmates across different sections of the facility. Through his performance, Siddiq wanted the inmates to know that they are partly responsible for their own rehabilitation, to show that he came from the same situation as them and made it out, and wanted to "change the mindset" of inmates and viewers alike.

== Production ==
Principal photography took place inside Bell County Jail in Belton, Central Texas in September 2017, marking roughly 20 years since Siddiq was freed from prison. He performed separately in front of male and female audiences, with the televised special being his performance in front of the male inmates. In it, he performs his stand-up in a dayroom surrounded by two floors of jail cells. Most of the inmates were seated in front of him while some watched from the guard railing on the second level. Comedy Central covered the costs of food and extra security, and paid $10,000 in overtime pay for jail employees.

After not receiving permission to perform in a Texas prison like he wanted, Siddiq stated that he wrote new material for his performance "because I wasn't going to do a prison thing in a jail." Bell County reviewed his material before the performance, and reviewed the special before it aired. Siddiq stated that he had initially "lost motivation in the project" but changed his mind during post-production; "When I saw the trailer, I must admit that it gave a different sense of something that I didn't actually see [...] By me doing that jail, I got an opportunity to reach women as well. That elevated it to me being extremely proud of this special."

== Release and reception ==
It's Bigger Than These Bars premiered on February 23, 2018 at 11:00 PM EST on Comedy Central. It averaged 227,000 viewers and a rating share of 0.11 in the 18–49 age demographic in the Nielsen TV ratings. It was the 104th most-viewed cable television program that day. Comedy Central Records digitally released the special as a 10-track comedy album on August 20, 2019. YouTube channel Comedy Central Stand-Up uploaded the full special online on June 13, 2020, and again on October 3, 2022.

The Temple Daily Telegram reported Bell County Jail Administrator Byron Shelton's assessment of the show's impact on the facility, "Not only did the morale of the inmates improve, but the morale of the jailers did, too. People matured and were able to open up dialogues with the inmates." Siddiq later told the Austin Chronicle that "they were actually really satisfied with the job that I did. And I assured them that my intent wasn't to come back to bash the prison system. I told them that I didn’t think that would be wise for me to waste [this] opportunity."

In May 2018, the special was shortlisted for a Primetime Emmy Award for Outstanding Variety Special (Pre-Recorded) but failed to be nominated. 800 Pound Gorilla's blog The Laugh Button ranked it #20 on its list of "The 20 Best Comedy Specials and Albums of 2018" on December 31.

== Potential sequel ==
In an interview to Vulture published earlier in the day about the forthcoming comedy special, Ali Siddiq remarked, "It kind of feels like that even though it's not the whole finished story, this is like the crescent moon to my story [...] it's not that actual prison story until Texas gives me the opportunity to go back into a Texas prison and do it from a place where I spent a lot of time." When asked if there was "still some unfinished business for you in terms of this theme", Siddiq responded, "There’s definitely unfinished business." He also revealed, "I have the prison special written, which is at least two hours."
