= Ali Siddiq =

American comedian (born 1973)

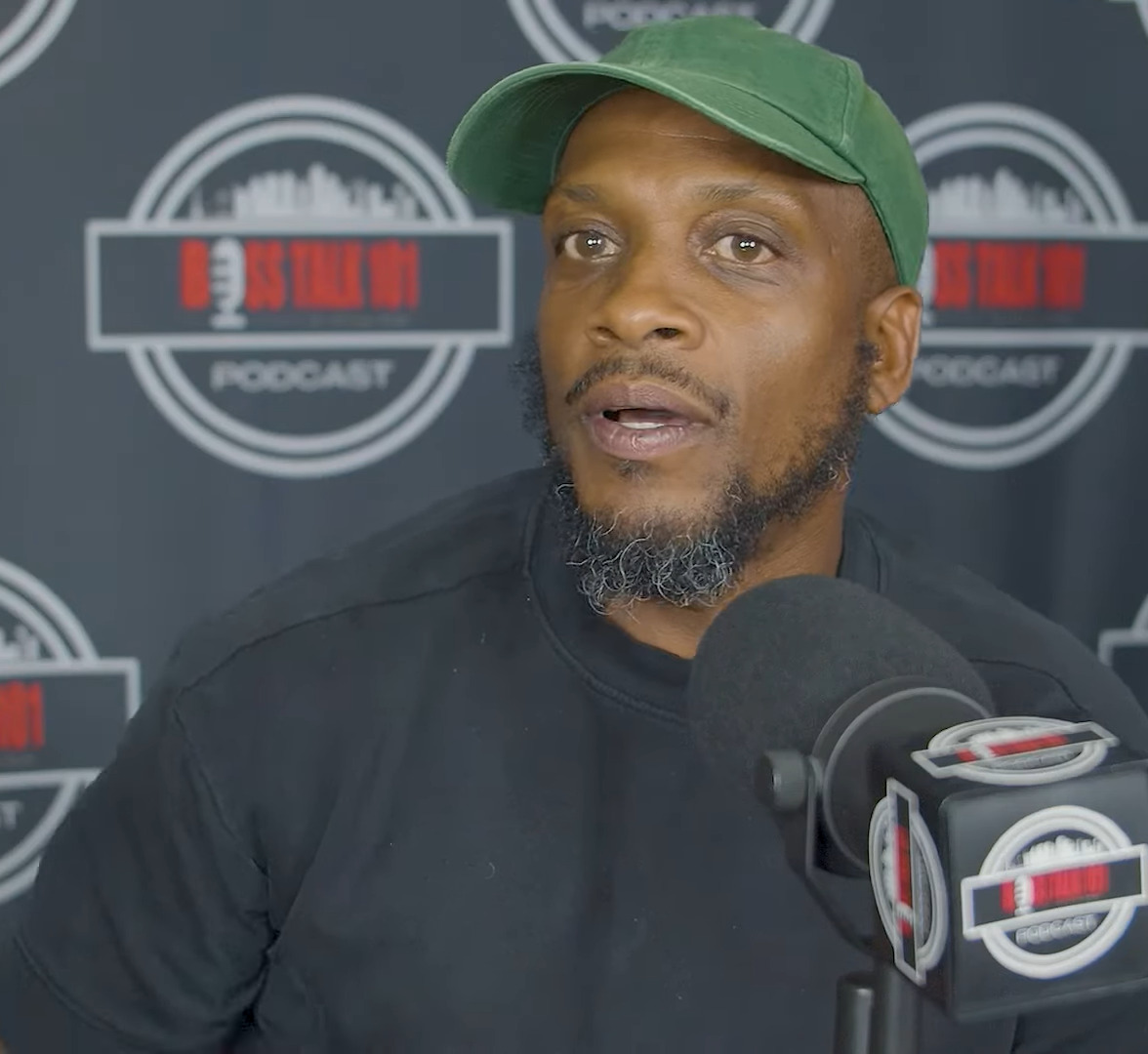
- Siddiq in 2024
- Born: Siddiq Nasir Abdullah Ali; October 17, 1973 (age 53); Houston, Texas, U.S.
- Children: 9

Comedy career
- Years active: 1998–present
- Medium: Stand-up comedy; radio
- Genres: Anecdotal comedy; observational comedy; storytelling
- Subjects: Everyday life; American sociopolitics; race relations
- Website: www.alisiddiq.com

Siddiq Nassir Abdullah Ali (born October 17, 1973), known professionally as Ali Siddiq, is an American stand-up comedian, writer and former radio personality based in Houston, Texas. He debuted his comedy album in 2010, his half-hour television special in 2016 and his hour-long TV special in 2018. Siddiq was the winner of Comedy Central's inaugural Up Next competition in 2013 and was a finalist on NBC's competition TV show Bring the Funny in 2019. He was the co-host of R&B afternoon radio show Uncle Funky Larry Jones & Ali Siddiq on KMJQ (Majic 102.1) in Greater Houston from January 2021 to January 2024.

== Early life ==
Siddiq was born in Houston, Texas, and grew up primarily on Hillcroft on the southwest side of Houston. He attended Jane Long and then Paul Revere middle schools. After his parents' separation, Siddiq and his siblings were raised by their mother, living for a brief time in the projects. He and his siblings also went on to live with other family members. At age 10, Siddiq was almost run over by a car, which resulted in his mother and aunt getting into a fight with the driver after she refused to apologize. When he was 18 years old, Siddiq's maternal half-sister Ashley died at the age of eight.

He began selling illicit drugs at age 14. Siddiq attended Texas Southern University (TSU), and was arrested four days after he turned age 19 for cocaine trafficking. He was convicted of "delivery of a controlled substance" and served six years of a 15-year sentence, primarily at Darrington Unit in Rosharon, Torres Unit in Hondo, Bill Clements Unit in Amarillo and Ellis Unit in Huntsville. He was released from Texas prison on October 21, 1997. He worked at Sharpstown Mall following his release, first at a department store and next at Sunglass Hut. It was during his incarceration, while telling jokes to fellow inmates to lighten the mood, that he discovered his ability to make people laugh. While in prison, he worked in the prison laundromat, and his workmates were his captive audience.

== Career ==
=== 1998–2009 ===
Siddiq first performed stand-up at the Just Joking comedy club in Houston in December 1997, where he entered an open mic during "Apollo Night" which tended to attract a college crowd. Siddiq recalls that he was booed his first time on stage because he was wearing a suit. He waited two weeks to perform again in denim jeans and a T-shirt this time. By February 1998, Siddiq was hired to be the co-host of the show. He resumed wearing suits after he met Rickey Smiley at the Arena Theatre who recommended he do so to impress audiences. Other local venues he performed for included The Secret Group comedy club, Red Cat jazz club, Cardi's 2000 rock club, and The Horn where he would go on to become a host. The first comedian Siddiq went on tour with was Lavell Crawford.

He performed on BET's Comic View a few times between 2000 and 2003, and again on Comic View: One Mic Stand on May 13, 2009. When asked for advice, host Bruce Bruce told him "do not quit your day job until your stand-up comedy is making more money for you consistently than your job", recounts Siddiq. After his first taping of the program in 1999, he decided to make stand-up comedy his career. According to interviews in March 2014 and December 2018, respectively, Siddiq stated he had recorded seven and nine albums, the first of which was titled Necessary Therapy, but was not satisfied enough with any of them to release them. He also competed on Bill Bellamy's Who's Got Jokes? on TV One.

Siddiq performed on the series finale of HBO's Def Comedy Jam on the 10th episode of the eighth season which aired on March 8, 2008. According to Siddiq, Rob Stapleton had previously told him to "Get out of the Chitlin' Circuit, and get in a mainstream room. Don't worry about how much they pay." After Siddiq received a call from the Houston Improv to host, a position which doesn't pay much, he accepted the offer and hosted six shows for DL Hughley who next asked him to join him on tour. When Hughley went on to be the host of Def Comedy Jam he was offered four spots by the network, one of which was filled by Siddiq.

=== 2010–2014 ===
In 2010, Siddiq independently self-released his debut comedy album Talking Loud Saying Something, initially as a digital album on May 22 before releasing it through CD Baby in December. It began his gradual turn towards the storytelling style of comedy that he became famous for roughly five years later. "I changed on my first album, which I thought was a lot more in-depth than someone would have known if they had just listened to the album", Siddiq recounted in a March 2018 interview; "The way I sounded and the way I delivered, I was like 'this is going to be the blueprint of my transition.'"

Siddiq performed on The Comedy Time Show on its fifth episode which aired on MavTV on February 12, 2012, and performed on Bounce TV's Off the Chain which aired on November 19. Siddiq hosted and performed as the opening act on Bill Bellamy's Ladies Night Out Tour television special which aired on Showtime on February 22, 2013. He released his second comedy album Freedom of Speech on August 5, and released his third album Enjoy Your Life on August 15, both through Houston-based SoSouth Music Distribution.

On November 18, 2013, Ali Siddiq was voted the winner of Comedy Central's inaugural Up Next stand-up comedy competition. Siddiq was one of more than 300 comedians nationwide that performed at 'Preliminary' local showcases in September, with 40 comedians qualifying to the 'Semi-finals' held at four locations across the country in Boston, Chicago, San Francisco and Fort Lauderdale in October. Siddiq performed at Houston Improv before qualifying to perform at Chicago Improv. He became one of nine comedians that qualified to perform at the 'Finals' at New York Comedy Festival's Comics to Watch showcase on November 6. Siddiq performed as the opening act on the second and final annual Centric Comedy All-Stars which aired on Centric on March 15, 2014.

=== 2015–2019 ===
In 2015, he performed on the Comedy Central television series This Is Not Happening on the second episode of the first season which aired on January 26. The video of his story recounting his experience during a prison riot where he learned the meaning of the phrase "Mexican got on boots!" became viral on YouTube. Siddiq appeared on AXS TV's Gotham Comedy Live on the fourth episode of the fifth season which aired on September 17.

On September 16, 2016, Siddiq released his fourth album Damaged Goods through Comedy Central Records, and performed his debut half-hour special on Comedy Central series The Half Hour on the seventh episode of the fifth season which aired that same night. He competed on the channel's panel game show @midnight with Chris Hardwick which aired on December 8.

In 2017, he began production on his hour-long special It's Bigger Than These Bars, which was filmed at the Bell County Jail in Belton, Texas. Premiering on Comedy Central on February 23, 2018, Siddiq can be seen performing in front of an audience of male inmates interspersed with scenes of him sitting down for conversation with small groups of incarcerated men and women in their respective cells and with jail administrators.

In 2018, Siddiq appeared on Desus & Mero which aired on Viceland on February 21, and appeared on The Opposition with Jordan Klepper which aired on Comedy Central on February 22.

In 2019, he was a contestant on NBC's comedy competition TV show Bring the Funny which premiered on July 9. Siddiq was one of 40 acts that performed in the televised 'Open Mic' stage, wherefrom he advanced to the 'Comedy Clash' stage. He became one of 16 acts that qualified to perform in the 'Semi-Finals Showcase' where Siddiq became one of five acts that qualified to perform on the 'Finale' stage that aired on September 10. The winner was declared on September 17, which marked the final episode of the 11-episode season. He appeared on the Comedy Central series This Week at the Comedy Cellar which aired on August 2, and was a guest on TV One's late night talk show The DL Hughley Show which aired on September 5. Siddiq released his comedy album The Prison Manual through 800 Pound Gorilla Records on September 20, and appeared in the feature film The Workout Room which released on October 8.

=== 2020–2024 ===
Siddiq headlined Laff Mobb's Laff Tracks on the 11th episode of the second season which aired on TruTV on January 17, 2020. In January 2021, Siddiq joined as co-host on the Funky Larry Jones afternoon drive show on urban adult contemporary station KMJQ (Majic 102.1), with the program being renamed Uncle Funky Larry Jones & Ali Siddiq and carrying the tagline "The Funky and the Funny". The FM radio show concluded on January 26, 2024, after Jones was given notice a day in advance of its cancellation after being on the air since 2014.

In 2022, Siddiq performed an hour-long special on Epix series Unprotected Sets on the fourth episode of the third season which aired on February 25, and released his next special Domino Effect on YouTube on May 19. He appeared on HBO variety show Pause with Sam Jay on the second episode of the third season which aired on June 3, guest-starred on Showtime series Flatbush Misdemeanors on the second episode of the second season which aired on June 26, and appeared on the Dark Side of Comedy on the fifth episode of the first season which aired on Vice TV on September 13.

Siddiq performed on the second episode of DL Hughley's Speakeasy, a three-part stand-up comedy series, which released on Hitkor in early 2023. He appeared on Vice News and The Marshall Project's documentary series Inside Story on its seventh episode "The Rise of Life-Without-Parole Sentences" which released on March 16. He released his special Domino Effect 2: Loss on YouTube on June 4.

In a July 2023 interview, Siddiq revealed he had recorded two comedy albums, The Missing Piece and Dope Without Association. He released his comedy special Don't Judge a Book By Its Cover on YouTube on November 20, and appeared in the feature film This Christmas Chance which released on December 10.

In 2024, he released his special Domino Effect 3 on Moment.co on March 10, before uploading it on YouTube on May 11. Siddiq released his special Domino Effect 4 on Moment.co on April 18, before uploading it on YouTube on June 15. Both specials were shortlisted for the Primetime Emmy Award for Outstanding Variety Special (Pre-Recorded) on June 24 but failed to be nominated. On July 9, Siddiq announced he would be recording his next two TV specials My Two Sons and I'm Not Handy on October 5 and 6, respectively.

=== 2025–present ===
In 2025, he released his special My Two Sons on Moment.co on March 9, before uploading it on YouTube on May 11. Siddiq released his special Rugged on March 26, before uploading it on YouTube on June 15. He filmed his next two specials in Detroit. Ali Siddiq graced the cover of Sheen magazine for its September–October issue, becoming the first male comedian to do so. Siddiq participated at the Riyadh Comedy Festival, which spanned September 26 to October 9, an event Human Rights Watch characterized as an effort by Saudi Arabia's government to whitewash its human rights abuses.

In 2026, Siddiq's special My Two Sons was nominated for an NAACP Image Award for Outstanding Variety – Series or Special on January 12, becoming the first independently produced stand-up comedy special to do so, which he won on February 22. He released his special My Father on his official website on March 22, before uploading it on YouTube on June 22.

== Influences ==
Siddiq had described watching Carol Burnett, Rodney Dangerfield, Don Rickles, Benny Hill, Phyllis Diller, Bill Cosby, Eddie Murphy and Richard Pryor growing up. He also watched Hee Haw, Diff'rent Strokes, Sanford and Son, Good Times and The Cosby Show as a child, and credits Def Comedy Jam as giving him "the drive to start" doing stand-up comedy.

Siddiq's stand-up comedy tends to be in the storytelling style, versus the more common setup/punch-line style. Siddiq's sets involve stories from his personal life, as well his observations on current events, sociopolitics, and race.

== Filmography and discography ==
=== Stand-up comedy releases ===
Solo albums and TV specials
Title	Release date	Debut medium
Talking Loud Saying Something	May 22, 2010	Audio streaming
Freedom of Speech	August 5, 2013	Audio CD
Enjoy Your Life	August 18, 2013	Audio CD
Damaged Goods	September 16, 2016	Audio streaming
The Half Hour: Ali Siddiq	September 16, 2016	Television (Comedy Central)
It's Bigger Than These Bars	February 23, 2018	Television (Comedy Central)
The Prison Manual	September 20, 2019	Audio streaming
Unprotected Sets: Ali Siddiq	February 25, 2022	Television (Epix)
Domino Effect	May 19, 2022	Streaming TV (YouTube)
Domino Effect 2: Loss	June 4, 2023	Streaming TV (YouTube)
Don't Judge a Book by Its Cover	November 20, 2023	Streaming TV (YouTube)
Domino Effect 3: First Day of School	March 10, 2024	Streaming TV (Moment.co)
Domino Effect 4: Pins & Needles	April 18, 2024	Streaming TV (Moment.co)
My Two Sons	March 9, 2025	Streaming TV (Moment.co)
Rugged	March 26, 2025	Streaming TV (Moment.co)
Mondays	December 21, 2025	Streaming TV (YouTube)
My Father	March 22, 2026	Streaming TV

Collaborative albums and TV specials
Title	Release date	Debut medium
Bill Bellamy's Ladies Night Out Tour	February 22, 2013	Television (Showtime)
Centric Comedy All-Stars 2014	March 15, 2014	Television (Centric)
Just For Laughs: Premium – Volume 11	November 23, 2018	Audio streaming
Comedy in Color 3: Volume 5	July 22, 2022	Audio streaming
The Jive Turkeys: 20th Anniversary Special	May 10, 2026	Streaming TV (YouTube)

=== Acting cameos ===
Television, film, and music videos
Year	Title	Note	Ref.
1999	4 Deep	Film; Re-released as Death of a G in 2006.	
2005	"Back Then" (Mike Jones)	Music videos for Who is Mike Jones?	
2005	"Flossin" (Mike Jones ft. Big Moe)	Music videos for Who is Mike Jones?	
2006	"Chunk Up the Deuce" (Lil Keke ft. Paul Wall, Bun B)	Music video for Minor Setback for the Major Comeback	
2019	The Workout Room	Film	
2022	Pause with Sam Jay	Episode: "I Know Why The Caged Homie Sings"	
2022	Flatbush Misdemeanors	Episode: "Obiageli"	
2023	This Christmas Chance	Film	

=== Bibliography ===
- Domino Effect (June 2023)
- Applied Advice (July 2025)

== Personal life ==
Siddiq's eldest daughter was born in December 1998. His father died on February 14, 2018. Siddiq resides in Pearland in the Greater Houston metropolitan area.

Since 2009, Siddiq has hosted the annual Jive Turkeys Comedy Show to raise money for the Houston Food Bank. The show is performed each November close to Thanksgiving. In 2017, he organized and performed at a benefit for Houstonians affected by Hurricane Harvey. In 2018, Siddiq also performed at an annual benefit held by Saba Homes, an orphanage organization created to help orphans of the 2005 Kashmir earthquake in Pakistan. Siddiq has also volunteered for Harris County's Juvenile Justice Alternative Education Program.
