= This Is Not Happening (TV series) =

- Created by: Ari Shaffir; Sam Saifer; Eric Abrams
- Presented by: Ari Shaffir (seasons 1-3); Roy Wood Jr. (season 4)
- Country of origin: United States
- No. of seasons: 4
- No. of episodes: 46

Production
- Executive producers: Sam Saifer; Ari Shaffir; Eric Abrams; Jeff Tomsic
- Running time: 22 minutes
- Production companies: Tax Purposes 588! Yo Guys Productions

Original release
- Network: Comedy Central
- Release: January 16, 2015 – April 5, 2019

This Is Not Happening is an American comedy storytelling television series that aired on Comedy Central. It premiered on January 22, 2015, and was hosted by its creator Ari Shaffir in its first three seasons and by Roy Wood Jr. in its fourth season. Episodes focus on comedic retellings of real-life experiences of comedians.

== History ==
Beginning as a live show, This Is Not Happening later debuted exclusively on the Internet for its first two seasons. The show was taped at Cheetah's Strip Club in Hollywood, and featured comedians such as David Koechner, T.J. Miller, Natasha Leggero, Kumail Nanjiani, and Joe Rogan. Comedy Central later announced it would be given an eight episode first season on television, making it the first series to be adapted from its digital department to its cable network. In advance of the show's premiere, the first episode was available for streaming on Amazon on January 12, 2015. Comedians featured on the first cable season of the show include Marc Maron, Keegan-Michael Key, Paul Scheer, and Iliza Shlesinger. For the 4th season, Ari Shaffir was replaced by Daily Show correspondent Roy Wood Jr.

There are numerous bonus online segments unaired for television that have either season intros with: Ari Shaffir in a wine-colored jacket with glasses (Season 1), Shaffir in a denim suit with a low mohawk (Season 2), Shaffir dressed in a purple & gold tux (Season 3), or Roy Wood Jr. (Season 4), as well as the show topic. These include:

- Season 1: Duncan Trussell (Brain on Drugs), Marc Maron (Brain on Drugs), Will Weldon (Battle), Kevin Christy (Romance), Giulia Rozzi (Emergency), Sean O'Connor (Wonder Years), Ms. Pat (Wonder Years), Cy Amundson (Travel), Bobby Lee (Friendship);
- Season 2: Ari & Mat Edgar (Psychedelia), Ben Roy (Crime), Artie Lange (Romance), Mark Normand (Romance), Bret Ernst (Bloodline), Christina Pazsitsky (Melee), Mike Lawrence (Disaster), Annie Lederman (Nostalgia), Ari & Al Madrigal (Karma), Solomon Georgio (Karma);
- Season 3: Joe List (Scumbag), Jessa Reed (Drugs), Dan St. Germain (Drugs), Pete Johansson (Mortality), Ryan Sickler (Blunder), Dave Ross (The Law), Aaron Berg (Romance), Sofiya Alexandra (Family), Scruncho (Rage); and
- Season 4: Tommy Pope (Filth), Brooks Wheelan (Romance), Krystyna Hutchinson (Romance), Pat Dixon (Nightmare), B-Phlat (Moms), Brandt Tobler (Dads), Chris Garcia (Combat), Doug Smith (Combat), and Kelsey Cook (Shame).

== Online exclusives ==
Season	Episodes	Originally released	
Season	Episodes	First released	Last released
1	13	June 4, 2013	August 27, 2013
2	12	November 5, 2013	February 4, 2014
3	7	November 19, 2013	February 11, 2014

=== This is Not Happening Presents: One Crazy Night (2013) ===
No. overall	No. in season	Title	Original release date
1	1	"T.J. Miller Has a Seizure"	June 4, 2013
2	2	"Ari Shaffir Does Drugs"	June 11, 2013
3	3	"Sean Patton Gets Gay Bashed"	June 18, 2013
4	4	"Julia Lillis Will Do Literally Anything for Love"	June 25, 2013
5	5	"Kyle Kinane Almost Gets Killed"	July 2, 2013
6	6	"Harley Morenstein Parties Too Hard"	July 9, 2013
7	7	"Jon Huck Loses His Pants"	July 16, 2013
8	8	"Joey Diaz Does Heroin"	July 23, 2013
9	9	"Tom Segura Overdoses"	July 30, 2013
10	10	"Doug Benson Gets Naked"	August 6, 2013
11	11	"The Walsh Brothers Meet a Pervert"	August 13, 2013
12	12	"Jackie Clarke Has an Affair"	August 20, 2013
13	13	"Ari Shaffir Visits a Strip Club"	August 27, 2013

=== This is Not Happening Presents: Fisticuffs (2013–2014) ===
No. overall	No. in season	Title	Original release date
14	1	"Ari Shaffir Fights a Girl"	November 5, 2013
15	2	"Big Jay Oakerson Sees Some Boobs"	November 12, 2013
16	3	"Joe Rogan Meets a Crazy Stripper"	November 19, 2013
17	4	"Kurt Braunohler Beats up a DJ"	November 26, 2013
18	5	"Moshe Kasher Offends Some Jews"	December 3, 2013
19	6	"Joey Diaz's Mom Starts a Fight"	December 10, 2013
20	7	"David Koechner Poops on a Cop Car"	December 17, 2013
21	8	"Trevor Moore Escapes From Mexico"	January 7, 2014
22	9	"Fortune Feimster Hates an Old Spaniard"	January 14, 2014
23	10	"Steve Rannazzisi, Bobby Lee, Natasha Leggero, and Ari Shaffir"	January 21, 2014
24	11	"Jeff Dye Could Go to Jail for This"	January 28, 2014
25	12	"Kumail Nanjiani Tries Hard to be Cool"	February 4, 2014

=== This is Not Happening Presents: World of Blunder (2013–2014) ===
No. overall	No. in season	Title	Original release date
16	1	"Joe Rogan Meets a Crazy Stripper"	November 19, 2013
18	2	"Moshe Kasher Offends Some Jews"	December 3, 2013
20	3	"David Koechner Poops on a Cop Car"	December 17, 2013
21	4	"Trevor Moore Escapes from Mexico"	January 7, 2014
22	5	"Fortune Feimster Hates an Old Spaniard"	January 14, 2014
24	6	"Jeff Dye Could Go to Jail for This"	January 28, 2014
26	7	"Ari Shaffir Goes to Tijuana with Bobby Lee"	February 11, 2014

== Television seasons ==
Season	Episodes	Originally aired	
Season	Episodes	First aired	Last aired
1	8	January 16, 2015	March 20, 2015
2	8	February 24, 2016	April 13, 2016
3	10	October 14, 2016	December 16, 2016
4	20	February 3, 2018	April 5, 2019

=== Season 1 (2015) ===
No. overall	No. in season	Title	Original release date
1	1	"S01E01: Brain on Drugs (Ari Shaffir, Bobby Lee, Keegan-Michael Key)"	January 16, 2015
2	2	"S01E02: Battle (Bert Kreischer, Paul Scheer, Ali Siddiq)"	January 26, 2015
3	3	"S01E03: Family (Tom Papa, Ralphie May, Rob Corddry)"	February 6, 2015
4	4	"S01E04: Romance (Big Jay Oakerson, Iliza Shlesinger, Barry Rothbart)"	February 13, 2015
5	5	"S01E05: Emergency (Steve Rannazzisi, Marc Maron, Ms. Pat)"	February 25, 2015
6	6	"S01E06: Wonder Years (Ari Shaffir, D.L. Hughley, Jay Larson)"	March 4, 2015
7	7	"S01E07: Travel (Joe Rogan, Tom Segura, Cristela Alonzo)"	March 13, 2015
8	8	"S01E08: Friendship (Ari Shaffir, Pete Carboni, Joey Diaz)"	March 20, 2015

=== Season 2 (2016) ===
No. overall	No. in season	Title	Original release date
9	1	"S02E01: Psychedelia (Henry Rollins, Dan Cummins, Ari Shaffir)"	February 24, 2016
10	2	"S02E02: Crime (Jim Breuer, Ari Shaffir, Kurt Metzger)"	March 2, 2016
11	3	"S02E03: Romance (Kate Willett, Kyle Kinane, Nick Swardson)"	March 9, 2016
12	4	"S02E04: Bloodline (Moshe Kasher, Hannah Friedman, Joey Diaz)"	March 16, 2016
13	5	"S02E05: Melee (Al Madrigal, Felipe Esparza, Joe DeRosa)"	March 23, 2016
14	6	"S02E06: Disaster (Ari Shaffir, Nicole Byer, Ron White)"	March 29, 2016
15	7	"S02E07: Nostalgia (Artie Lange, Randall Park, Steve Simeone)"	April 5, 2016
16	8	"S02E08: Karma (Ari Shaffir, Sean Patton, Joey Diaz)"	April 13, 2016

=== Season 3 (2016) ===
No. overall	No. in season	Title	Original release date
17	1	"S03E01: Scumbag (Ari Shaffir, and Sal Vulcano)"	October 14, 2016
18	2	"S03E02: Mortality (Doug Stanhope, Lavell Crawford, and Greg Behrendt)"	October 21, 2016
19	3	"S03E03: Panic (Maria Bamford, Andrew W.K., and Al Jackson)"	October 28, 2016
20	4	"S03E04: Blunder (Brian Regan, Ari Shaffir, and Rory Scovel)"	November 4, 2016
21	5	"S03E05: The Law (Louie Anderson, Liza Treyger, and Bonnie McFarlane)"	November 11, 2016
22	6	"S03E06: Romance (Big Jay Oakerson, Julian McCullough, and Bobby Lee)"	November 18, 2016
23	7	"S03E07: Adventure (Sean Flannery, Russell Peters, and Bert Kreischer)"	November 25, 2016
24	8	"S03E08: Drugs (Ari Shaffir, Steve Rannazzisi, and Nick Thune)"	December 2, 2016
25	9	"S03E09: Family (Tom Papa, Steve Simeone, and Gastor Almonte)"	December 9, 2016
26	10	"S03E10: Rage (Ali Siddiq, Greg Fitzsimmons, and Joey Diaz)"	December 16, 2016

=== Season 4 (2018–19) ===
No. overall	No. in season	Title	Original release date
27	1	"S04E01: Filth (Roy Wood Jr., Howie Mandel, and Scott Thompson)"	February 3, 2018
28	2	"S04E02: Romance (Kevin Smith, Louis Katz)"	February 10, 2018
29	3	"S04E03: Famous (Tom Green, Michael McDonald, Brad Williams)"	February 17, 2018
30	4	"S04E04: Nightmare (Dan Soder, Shane Mauss)"	February 24, 2018
31	5	"S04E05: Moms (Roy Wood Jr., Kathleen Madigan, Bret Ernst)"	March 3, 2018
32	6	"S04E06: Dads (Louie Anderson, Byron Bowers, DeRay Davis)"	March 10, 2018
33	7	"S04E07: Wasted (Theo Von, Tom Rhodes, Dave Landau, Chris Porter)"	March 17, 2018
34	8	"S04E08: Combat (Chris Redd, Martha Kelly, Lil Rel Howery)"	March 24, 2018
35	9	"S04E09: Strange Lands (Talib Kweli, Rob Christensen, Harland Williams)"	March 31, 2018
36	10	"S04E10: Shame (Big Jay Oakerson, Michael Kosta, Tom Arnold)"	April 7, 2018
37	11	"S04E11: Drugs, Drugs, Drugs (Roy Wood Jr., Drew Carey, Ali Siddiq, Jessa Reed)"	February 1, 2019
38	12	"S04E12: Genitalia (Jim Norton, Sean Patton, Joel Kim Booster)"	February 8, 2019
39	13	"S04E13: Grind (Roy Wood Jr., Carrot Top, Mike Lawrence)"	February 15, 2019
40	14	"S04E14: Youth (Kyle Kinane, Kurt Metzger, Gastor Almonte)"	February 22, 2019
41	15	"S04E15: Soulmates (Eddie Pepitone, Thomas Dale, Dave Macklovitch)"	March 1, 2019
42	16	"S04E16: Killers (Tiffany Haddish, Mark Normand, DeRay Davis)"	March 8, 2019
43	17	"S04E17: Crime & Punishment (Tommy Chong, Tone Bell, Steve Lemme)"	March 15, 2019
44	18	"S04E18: Danger (Roy Wood Jr., Darrell Hammond, Sean Flannery)"	March 22, 2019
45	19	"S04E19: Despair (Brendan Schaub, Rita Rudner, Ryan Sickler)"	March 29, 2019
46	20	"S04E20: Lies (Jay Larson, Julian McCullough, Joey Diaz)"	April 5, 2019

== See also ==
- Unprotected Sets
