= Vince Offer =

American salesman and actor (born 1964)

- עופר שלומי
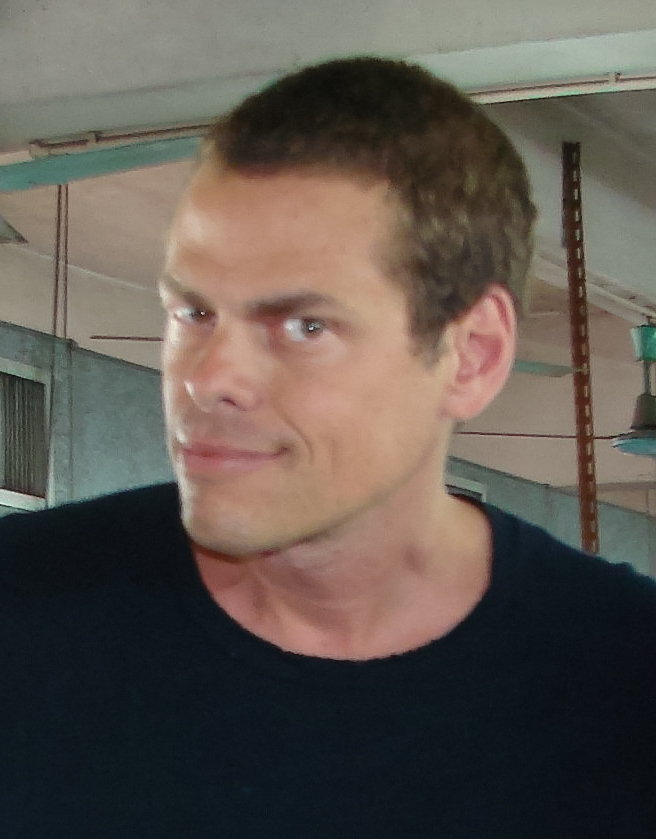
- Offer in 2009
- Born: Offer Vince Shlomi; April 25, 1964 (age 62); Beersheba, Southern District, Israel
- Other names: Vince Shlomi, ShamWow Guy
- Occupations: Salesman; screenwriter; film director; film producer; comedian; editor
- Years active: 1988–present
- Known for: Infomercial acting
- Political party: Republican
- Spouse: Melody Claire Mandate (m. 2014; div. 2018)
- Children: 1
- Website: Campaign website squareoneent.com

Offer Vince Shlomi (Hebrew: עופר שלומי; born April 25, 1964), also known as Vince Offer, is an American infomercial pitchman, screenwriter, actor, and director. He is best known for infomercials for his own products including "ShamWow!", an absorbent towel; the "Slap Chop", a kitchen utensil; a lint roller called the "Schticky"; a liquid cleaner called "InVinceable"; and another kitchen utensil called "Crank Chop". Offer's first major work was the 1999 comedy film The Underground Comedy Movie. He ran for Congress in 2026, unsuccessfully challenging incumbent John Carter to be the Republican nominee for Texas's 31st congressional district.

== Early life ==
Offer Vince Shlomi was born in Beersheba, Israel. His family immigrated to the U.S. when he was a child and he grew up in Sheepshead Bay, Brooklyn, New York. Offer grew up with a single mother. Offer dropped out of high school at the age of 17 and moved to Los Angeles. He began going by the name Vince Offer in 1986 and started appearing on public access television.

== Career ==
=== Film ===
In 1996, Offer directed and appeared in The Underground Comedy Movie, which was met with negative reviews and led to several lawsuits. Many of the sketches were remade from when Offer appeared on public access television around the 1980s. Although the film was released and screened in 1999, Offer was bankrupt by 2002 and home video distribution plans were shelved, so he started selling the film via infomercials airing on Comedy Central between 2:00 AM and 4:00 AM. Within a few months, he had earned enough to resume production, and the movie was finally completed, released, and marketed entirely on late-night infomercials that Offer paid for with his earnings from the swap meet vegetable chopper sales. In 2011, he appeared as himself in the Adam Sandler film Jack and Jill. Title character Jill, played by Sandler, referred to him as "the ShamWow guy".

In 2013, Offer released the universally panned InAPPropriate Comedy, which he directed, wrote and appears in as a character called 'Peeping Tom'. The film was originally envisioned as a sequel to Underground Comedy Movie. The film features stars Rob Schneider, Michelle Rodriguez, Adrien Brody, Ari Shaffir, and Lindsay Lohan.

=== Infomercial marketing ===
After his successful infomercials for The Underground Comedy Movie, he ran an ad in 2010 for Eminem's Recovery album. In 2020, Eminem celebrated the album's 10th anniversary by introducing merchandise and sharing the original commercial starring Offer.

==== ShamWow ====
In 2006, Offer began to market a cleaning product that he saw in flea markets, an absorbent towel that he called the "ShamWow!" The advertisement, filmed in the summer of 2007 with a budget of $20,000, received critical praise. Slate's Seth Stevenson praised Offer for his "impressive and subtle mastery of the pitchman's art", and wondered if Offer's "abrasive manner might also mark a unique, new strategy in the annals of pitchdom." Stevenson compared Offer to earlier, "more upbeat" television pitchmen like Billy Mays and the Home Shopping Network hosts and concluded that Offer's "smooth-talking condescension" was more suited to the present "zeitgeist" than the "earnest fervor" of spokesmen like Mays and Ron Popeil.

Consumer Reports reported that the infomercial for "ShamWow!" initially featured Offer claiming that the product held "20 times its weight in liquid". Later, the infomercial was changed to Offer claiming the "ShamWow!" held "12 times its weight in liquid", then again to "10 times". Consumer Reports did its own test on the product and found that it does indeed hold ten times its weight in liquid but no more.

Offer says that he has sold millions of the towels. In contrast to claims that the absorbency of the towels is over-hyped, he responds that returns of the product are low. Pitchman Billy Mays had been promoting a similar product, Zorbeez; Popular Mechanics tested the absorbency of the two towel products and declared that "ShamWow!" was the more effective of the two. Still, it noted: "If you have reusable cloth rags (and a roll of paper towels for backup), then neither product is necessary."

Following the popularity of the commercial, TMZ posted a remix of the commercial on their site in 2009. The remix was originally created by DJ Steve Porter and uploaded on YouTube.

In 2020, Offer started to sell "ShamWow!" masks due to the COVID-19 pandemic. He appeared in an infomercial showing the cloths, followed by wearing the face mask, which are made up of viscose/polypropylene thermally bonded non-woven cloth, and then giving a thumbs up.

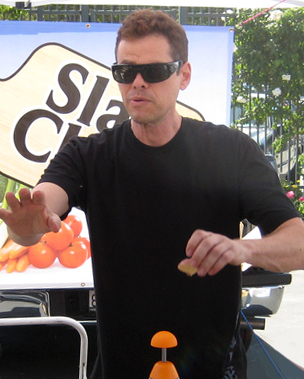
Vince pitching the Slap Chop in August 2008

==== Slap Chop ====
In December 2008, Offer, who had previously sold kitchen utensils at swap meets, appeared in another kitchen gadget infomercial, advertising the Slap Chop and the Graty. The Slap Chop is a hand-held chopping device with internal blades; to operate it, the user places it over a food item and slaps down the button on the top. The Graty is a cheese grater operated by placing the cheese inside and then turning the outside housing of the utensil which causes the cheese to be grated. The infomercial, filmed in August 2008, contains Offer's aggressiveness and uses of double entendres such as "you're gonna love my nuts" and "Stop having a boring tuna, stop having a boring life". The advertisement quickly went viral shortly after its release, and the uses of his aggressiveness and double entendres were noted by AdWeek, and, according to an Adweek blog, helped make Offer "the man who could beat Billy Mays at his own game."

Mays had been promoting a similar product set which included the Quick Chop utensil and the Quick Grater utensil prior to Offer's Slap Chop/Graty product set. Mays again noted that the Slap Chop commercials use many of the same demos as the earlier-produced Quick Chop commercial. Mays said in the same Adam Carolla radio show interview in February 2009 that Offer stole not only the Zorbeez product idea, but also the Quick Chop idea.

In April 2009, DJ Steve Porter posted an electro-themed "Slap Chop Rap" Auto Tune remix which grew a cult following during July 2009.

An excerpt from a televised Slap Chop commercial featuring Offer is briefly on screen during the 2013 blockbuster Marvel superhero movie Iron Man 3.

==== Schticky ====
In 2012, Offer returned to television selling the "Schticky", a reusable lint roller that comes in three sizes: little Schticky, Schticky, and big Schticky.

The commercial makes many references to his other two commercials for the ShamWow and the Slap Chop, with Offer saying many of his catchphrases. He also pokes fun at his 2009 arrest by posing for a fake mugshot.

The Schticky commercial was co-written by the comedian Dante.

A segment of the commercial briefly appears in the Breaking Bad episode "Say My Name".

==== Canada Green ====
In April 2014, Offer appeared in a Canada Green commercial advertising their "Quicky Grass" product.

==== Crank Chop ====
In December 2015, Offer appeared in a Crank Chop infomercial demonstrating the abilities of the product that slices and dices food with the pull of a nylon cord.

=== Politics ===
In October 2025, Offer released "Woke Busters", a video parodying the Ghostbusters theme song, featuring Texas Republican Congressional candidate Valentina Gomez. Offer sings "If there's something creepy looking at your pee-pee" while showing a man dressed in feminine attire in a park and then cutting to a shot of a young boy holding a basketball, with the camera zooming in slightly on the boy's clothed crotch. The video includes people wearing MAGA hats, with a scene showing a college admitting students based solely on race due to DEI policies.

In November 2025, Offer filed to run for the Republican nomination in Texas's 31st congressional district, the same district Gomez was running in, aiming to unseat incumbent congressman John Carter. In an interview with Fox News, he stated that he would run on an anti-woke platform, and that he was inspired to enter the race by the assassination of Charlie Kirk. He was defeated in the Republican primary by Carter, placing sixth in a field of ten. He later announced he was suing the Texas Republican Party, claiming that by removing the word “Shamwow” from the ballot, the election was rigged in Carter's favor.

== Legal issues ==
=== Lawsuits ===
The Underground Comedy Movie was the subject of a lawsuit filed on September 23, 1998, by Offer against 20th Century Fox and Bobby and Peter Farrelly, the co-directors of There's Something About Mary. Offer claimed that 14 scenes from Mary were lifted from his film. The Farrellys denied this claim, stating, "We've never heard of him, we've never heard of his movie, and it's all a bunch of baloney." The case was dismissed in 2000, with the judge ordering Offer to pay over $66,000 in attorneys' fees.

In October 2000, Offer sued Anna Nicole Smith for $4 million, claiming that Smith had agreed to be in his movie, but backed out in 1996 over fears that appearing in the movie would be detrimental to her career. Offer claimed that as a result of her backing out of the film, the crew lost $100,000.

In 2011, he was sued by his former personal assistant Jennifer Kosinski, who alleged that he stalked and emotionally abused her, forced her to be with him at all times, groped her, and offered her $20,000 for her to vacation with her family in exchange for her eggs.

=== Arrest ===
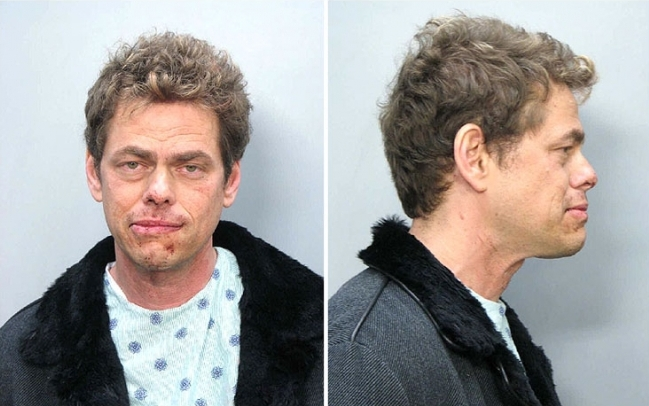
Offer's mugshots after his arrest

On February 7, 2009, Offer and a 26-year-old prostitute were both arrested at The Setai hotel in Miami Beach, Florida, after a physical altercation. The police report stated that the woman had bitten Offer's tongue and refused to let go, at which point Offer punched her in the face and left her with lacerations and fractures. Police later released photos of the bloodied Offer, hotel room, and the battered woman. Prosecutors later declined to file formal charges against either person. When Offer later spoke of the arrest, he stated, "It probably saved my life."

== Personal life ==
Vince Offer married Melody Claire Mandate on April 18, 2014. He has one daughter with her. Mandate filed for divorce on October 18, 2018. Offer divides his time between Los Angeles and Miami.

Offer joined the Church of Scientology in 1982. He was kicked out of the church following the release of The Underground Comedy Movie, as the church disapproved of the film's content.
