= Wasn't That a Mighty Storm =

"Wasn't That a Mighty Storm" is an American folk song concerning the 1900 hurricane that destroyed Galveston, Texas. It was revived and popularized by Eric Von Schmidt and Tom Rush in the 1960s, and later by the bluegrass musician Tony Rice.

== History ==
"Wasn't That a Mighty Storm" likely originated as a spiritual in Black churches in the early part of the 1900s. The precise origin of the song is unknown.

"Wasn't That a Mighty Storm" presents a tale of hardship and trouble and the sometimes inscrutable hand of God. Although the song dwells on tragedy, it was typical of soul music of the time. Similarly, there were dozens of songs written about the sinking of the Titanic and the Great Mississippi Flood of 1927.

The first recording of the song was in 1934 by a preacher named "Sin-Killer" Griffin for the Library of Congress, in a session conducted by folk song collector John A. Lomax at Darrington State Farm (now the Darrington Unit), a prison near Sandy Point, Texas. The prison inmates served as Griffin's congregation, and Griffin claimed authorship of the song. Since this is the first recording of the song, it is not clear whether the song originated in the aftermath of the 1900 Galveston hurricane, which (as of 2026) remains the deadliest natural disaster in United States history, responsible for an estimated 6,000 to 12,000 fatalities, or the lesser but more recent 1915 Galveston hurricane. As popularized in the 1960s, the song itself references the year 1900 and the lyrics state "Now Galveston had no seawall" which was built after the flood.

== Sin-Killer Griffin ==
Sin-Killer was a well-known preacher, with a mesmerizing delivery and full confidence in the name he had given himself. Death was a subject on which he preached frequently. Relatively little is known about his life, which makes it all the more intriguing that back in 1889, in Denton, Texas, a "Sin-Killer Griffin" tried to organize black Americans to invade Africa. There is some evidence this was the same Sin-Killer Griffin who resurfaced before John Lomax 45 years later, though this reference has not been verified conclusively.

Griffin told Lomax he had written "Wasn't That a Mighty Storm" years earlier, and the lyrics suggest that someone did, since one verse references the flood happening "fifteen years ago.".

== Later versions ==
The song largely stayed in the church until the late 1950s, when folk song revivalists began to record cover versions of rural acoustic songs that had been recorded in previous decades.

Eric Von Schmidt found "Mighty Storm" in the Library of Congress collection, and with his friend Rolf Cahn put together a compelling folk arrangement with powerful guitar chords and a bluesy melody. Von Schmidt handed it off to his fellow New England folkie Tom Rush, who recorded it on a popular album in the early 1960s. The Chad Mitchell Trio recorded a version of the song under the title "A Mighty Day." It appeared in their 1961 album "Mighty Day on Campus." It was revived again in 1972 by a late incarnation of the country band J.R. Mainer's Mountaineers, who may have performed it back in the 1930s. It was then recorded by Nanci Griffith, who is from Texas herself.

Somewhere along the way Sin-Killer Griffin's "fifteen years" became "50 years," suggesting the song was written around 1950, which it wasn't. But most of the other lyrics remained the same, even though several later singers credited themselves with an "adaptation" of "traditional" lyrics, usually cutting out Griffin.

Tom Rush, an American folk singer, guitarist and composer, recorded "Galveston Flood" in 1966 for his album Take a Little Walk With Me.

Tony Rice, an American guitarist and bluegrass musician, later revitalized the song with a new generation when he recorded the tune as "Galveston Flood" on his album "Tony Rice Plays and Sings Bluegrass" in 1993. Tony Rice is considered one of the most influential acoustic guitar players in bluegrass, progressive bluegrass, newgrass and acoustic jazz.

Canadian folk band The Duhks recorded the song on their 2008 album Fast Paced World.

James Taylor, American singer-songwriter, included his version of the song on his 2009 CD called Other Covers.

== Traditional lyrics ==
"Wasn't That a Mighty Storm"

Chorus:
Wasn't that a mighty storm
Wasn't that a mighty storm in the morning, well
Wasn't that a mighty storm
That blew all the people all away.

You know, the year of 1900, children,
Many years ago
Death came howling on the ocean
Death calls, you got to go
Now Galveston had a seawall
To keep the water down,
And a high tide from the ocean
Spread the water all over the town.

You know the trumpets give them warning
You'd better leave this place
Now, no one thought of leaving
'til death stared them in the face
And the trains they all were loaded
The people were all leaving town
The trestle gave way to the water
And the trains they went on down.

Rain it was a-falling
thunder began to roll
Lightning flashed like hellfire
The wind began to blow
Death, the cruel master
When the wind began to blow
Rode in on a team of horses
I cried, "Death, won't you let me go"

Hey, now trees fell on the island
And the houses give away
Some they strained and drowned
Some died in most every way
And the sea began to rolling
And the ships they could not stand
And I heard a captain crying
"God save a drowning man."

Death, your hands are clammy
You got them on my knee
You come and took my mother
Won't you come back after me
And the flood it took my neighbor
Took my brother, too
I thought I heard my father calling
And I watched my mother go.

You know, the year of 1900, children,
Many years ago
Death came howling on the ocean
Death calls, you got to go

== Tony rice version lyrics ==
"Wasn't That a Mighty Storm" / "Galveston Flood"

It was the year of 1900
that was 80 years ago
Death come'd a howling on the ocean
and when death calls you've got to go

Galveston had a sea wall
just to keep the water down
But a high tide from the ocean
blew the water all over the town

Chorus
Wasn't that a mighty storm
Wasn't that a mighty storm in the morning
Wasn't that a mighty storm
It blew all the people away

The sea began to rolling
the ships they could not land
I heard a captain crying
Oh God save a drowning man

The rain it was a falling
and the thunder began to roll
The lightning flashed like Hell-fire
and the wind began to blow

The trees fell on the island
and the houses gave away
Some they strived and drowned
others died every way

The trains at the station were loaded
with the people all leaving town
But the trestle gave way with the water
and the trains they went on down

Old death the cruel master
when the winds began to blow
Rode in on a team of horses
and cried death won't you let me go

The flood it took my mother
it took my brother too
I thought I heard my father cry
as I watched my mother go

Old death your hands are clammy
when you've got them on my knee
You come and took my mother
won't you come back after me?
