= Tony Rice Plays and Sings Bluegrass =

Studio album by Tony Rice
- Released: 1993
- Genre: Americana, bluegrass, folk
- Length: 40:36
- Label: Rounder
- Producer: Tony Rice, Bill Wolf

Tony Rice chronology
The Rice Brothers (1992)	Tony Rice Plays and Sings Bluegrass (1993)	The Rice Brothers 2 (1994)

Professional ratings
Review scores
Source	Rating
AllMusic	3/5 stars

Tony Rice Plays and Sings Bluegrass is an album by American guitarist Tony Rice, released in 1993.

== Track listing ==
1. "I've Waited as Long as I Can" (Hylo Brown) – 2:58
2. "Brown Mountain Light" (Scotty Wiseman) – 3:40
3. "How Mountain Girls Can Love" (Ruby Rakes) – 2:26
4. "Carolina Star" (Hugh Moffatt) – 3:09
5. "Thunderclouds of Love" (J. Hedre) – 2:50
6. "On and On" (Bill Monroe) – 3:04
7. "This Morning at Nine" (Sid Campbell) – 2:18
8. "I Wonder Where You Are Tonight" (Johnny Bond) – 3:12
9. "Galveston Flood" (John Duffey, Tom Rush) – 3:28
10. "Will You Be Loving Another Man?" (Lester Flatt, Monroe) – 3:01
11. "Girl from the North Country" (Bob Dylan) – 4:19
12. "Ain't Nobody Gonna Miss Me When I'm Gone" (Flatt) – 2:50
13. "I'll Stay Around" (Flatt) – 3:21

== Personnel ==
- Tony Rice – guitar, vocals
- Vassar Clements – fiddle
- Jerry Douglas – dobro
- Sam Bush – mandolin, vocals
- Mark Schatz – bass
- Jimmy Gaudreau – mandolin, vocals
- Larry Rice – mandolin, vocals
- Mike Auldridge – dobro, vocals
- Rico Petrucelli – bass
- John Duffey – mandolin, vocals
- Bill Emerson – banjo, vocals

Production notes:

- Tony Rice – producer
- Bill Wolf – producer, engineer
- David Glasser – mastering
- Tim Talley – photography
- Jack Tottle – liner notes
- Scott Billington – design
