= Inappropriate Comedy =

2013 American satirical sketch comedy film

inAPPropriate Comedy
- Theatrical release poster
- Directed by: Vince Offer
- Written by: Ken Pringle; Ari Shaffir; Vince Offer
- Produced by: Robert B. Shapiro; Ken Pringle
- Starring: Ari Shaffir; Rob Schneider; Michelle Rodriguez; Adrien Brody; Lindsay Lohan
- Cinematography: Anastas N. Michos; Ken Barrows
- Edited by: Sandy S. Solowitz
- Production companies: SquareOne Entertainment; Satura Films; S.O. Productions
- Distributed by: Freestyle Releasing
- Release date: March 22, 2013
- Running time: 83 minutes
- Country: United States
- Language: English
- Box office: $228,004

Inappropriate Comedy (stylized as inAPPropriate Comedy) is a 2013 American satirical sketch comedy film directed by Vince Offer. It stars Ari Shaffir (who also co-wrote), Rob Schneider, Michelle Rodriguez, Adrien Brody and Lindsay Lohan, and was released on March 22, 2013.

The film was originally envisioned as a sequel to Offer's previous anthology, The Underground Comedy Movie, and called Underground Comedy 2010. Trailers for Underground Comedy 2010 were released to TV and online until the film being billed as Inappropriate Comedy. It is also a partial remake of Offer's previous film, recycling the sketches "Flirty Harry" and "Sushi Mama". The film was a critical and commercial failure, with some critics comparing it to (the itself critically panned) Movie 43.

== Plot ==
The framing device has Vince Offer pressing keys on his tablet computer that open offensive applications.

Psychology World

A psychologist has a session with a sex-obsessed young woman who wants to change. She shows him the pills that "make her wild". He takes them and passes out on the floor.

Flirty Harry

Flirty Harry is a cop who, with his repertoire of frequently homoerotic double entendres, patrols the streets of San Francisco, CA.

Blackass

A Jackass spoof, where Vondell, Murphay, Swade, Darnell, and Acquon are five African American guys who go about their days causing trouble.

The Porno Review

J.D., Harriet, and Bob (who spends most of the time masturbating) host an At the Movies-style film review series that showcases pornographic films, including the dubbed Japanese film "Sushi Mama" and a homosexual parody of Swan Lake known as Sperm Lake.

Things You'll Never See

An attractive young woman dating an elderly poor man.

Above the Grate

Lindsay Lohan stands on an air vent much like Marilyn Monroe's famous scene from The Seven Year Itch while a man watches her from underneath.

The Amazing Racist

A spoof of reality game show The Amazing Race. Ari Shaffir and his cameraman go around the city acting in a racist and offensive way toward Asians, African Americans, Arabs, Latinos and Jews. It is strongly implied that Shaffir's behavior was unrehearsed and that the targets were chosen at random.

== Cast ==
Psychology World

- Rob Schneider as Psychologist
- Noelle Kenney as Patient

Flirty Harry

- Adrien Brody as Flirty Harry
- Jonathan Spencer as Lt. O'Flanagan
- Rick Chambers as Captain
- Andrea Lwin as Beautician

Blackass

- Da'Vone McDonald as Vondell
- Calvin Sykes as Murphay
- Thai Edwards as Swade
- Chalant Phifer as Darnell
- Ashton Jordaan Ruiz as Acquon
- Jessie Usher as Jamal
- Caroline Rich as Cindi

The Porno Review

- Rob Schneider as J.D.
- Michelle Rodriguez as Harriet
- Jonathan Spencer as Bob
- Isaac Cheung as Sushi Papa
- Jia Perlich as Sushi Mama
- Christopher Kosek as Hillbilly

Things You'll Never See

- Kiersten Hall as Beautiful girl
- Anthony Russell as Old man

Above the Grate

- Lindsay Lohan as herself
- Kenneth and Sasha Mayer as Kissing couple

Under the Grate

- Theo Von as Mountain climber
- Vince Offer as Peeping Tom

The Amazing Racist

- Ari Shaffir as The Amazing Racist
- Dante as The Racist Assistant

== Production ==
Lohan's scenes were shot in 2010 for Underground Comedy 2010, a production that would have mixed, newly-filmed sketches with sketches from the original 1997 production of The Underground Comedy Movie. The alcohol-detecting ankle monitor she was ordered to wear after she failed to show up for a court hearing is clearly visible as she stands on the street grate.

A trailer for Underground Comedy 2010 was released in August of that year. The project was eventually expanded to a fully new feature film with the production of additional new sketches. Ari Shaffir's segment mixed footage with unknowing collaborators and staged action, mostly using the same people brought back "to do a little extra so we can build a story or get me some comeuppance".

The film was directed by Vince Offer, who also directed The Underground Comedy Movie and, between the two films, became better known for his infomercial sales pitches (his best known product being the ShamWow absorbent towel).

== Reception ==
InAPPropriate Comedy was called "worse than Movie 43" by The Hollywood Reporter. On Rotten Tomatoes, the film has four reviews listed, all of which are negative. Metacritic, which uses a weighted average, assigned the film a score of 1 out of 100, based on 5 critics, indicating "overwhelming dislike". It is tied with 10 Rules for Sleeping Around, Chaos, Bio-Dome, Not Cool, The Singing Forest, The Garbage Pail Kids Movie, Death of a Nation, Hardbodies, Mother's Day and United Passions as the worst-reviewed film on the site.

Lohan was nominated for a Golden Raspberry Award for Worst Supporting Actress for her performance in the film (also for Scary Movie 5), but lost to Kim Kardashian for Temptation: Confessions of a Marriage Counselor.

=== Box office ===
The film earned $172,000 from 275 theaters, for a location average of $625 in its opening weekend.
