= Jose Sifuentes =

American serial killer (born 1978)

- Born: March 1978 (age 48)
- Conviction: Murder (3 counts)
- Penalty: Life imprisonment

Details
- Victims: 3
- Span of crimes: February 14, 1998 – May 15, 2003
- Country: United States
- State: Texas
- Date apprehended: May 19, 2003 (first); April 25, 2019 (second)
- Imprisoned at: Clements Unit

Jose Sifuentes (born March 1978) is a Mexican-American serial killer and former fugitive. In 2003, he was arrested for the rape-murder of a woman he lured from a club in Dallas, Texas, and while awaiting trial he posted bail and fled to Mexico, where he spent the next sixteen years avoiding arrest. During this time, he was linked to two previous murders through DNA evidence.

In April 2019, the FBI apprehended Sifuentes in Eastern Mexico, and he was extradited to the United States the following year. He pleaded guilty to each murder in 2021 and was sentenced to life in prison.

== Murders ==
At the time of the killings, Sifuentes worked at an auto repair shop as a mechanic. Each woman he murdered he had befriended at bars or clubs and convinced them to come home with him. He then proceeded to strip, rape, and kill them.

- Maria Perales – On February 15, 1998, an Old East Dallas resident stumbled upon the nude body of 20-year-old Maria de Lourdes Perales. Police early on determined that whoever had killed her had previously sexually assaulted her and then strangled her to death. They also determined that the killer had used their car to run over her dead body.
- Erica Hernandez – On June 27, 1998, the nude body of 23-year-old Erica Olivia Hernandez was found lying in a gravel pit in northwestern Dallas along Harry Hines Boulevard. She was determined to have also been raped and strangled.
- Veronica Hernandez – On May 16, 2003, the partially nude body of 27-year-old Veronica Hernandez was found outside an auto repair shop in southern Dallas, the same shop Sifuentes worked at. During the investigation authorities received a tip from a witness who had seen Hernandez with a mechanic who had the name "Jose" on their employee nametag. Subsequently, Sifuentes was arrested, and confessed to raping, choking, and strangling Hernandez to death. In July 2003 Sifuentes posted bail, and afterwards fled across the Mexico–United States border. Shortly after, DNA confirmed Sifuentes' responsibility in Hernandez's murder along with the previous murders. However, when authorities went to arrest him, they failed to find him. They soon realized that he had likely fled to Mexico, and the FBI was brought in to investigate and declared Sifuentes a fugitive from justice.

== Arrest in Mexico ==
Between 2003 and 2019, Sifuentes resided in San Vicente de González, a small town in Nuevo León with less than 200 residents. In 2016, the Dallas Police Department (DPD) and the District Attorney's office granted a provisional arrest warrant with the U.S. Department of Justice, and this gave them the authority to search for Sifuentes in Mexico. In January 2019 a judge in Mexico issued an arrest warrant for Sifuentes. In April 2019 the DPD, FBI, and DA's office successfully located Sifuentes' whereabouts and arrested him, taking him into custody in Mexico City. After lengthy extradition proceedings, he was returned to Texas on January 8, 2020, and charged with the murders. On May 13, 2021, Sifuentes pleaded guilty to three counts of murder and received three life sentences.

Sifuentes is currently incarcerated at the Clements Unit in Amarillo.

== See also ==
- List of serial killers in the United States
