= Ramy Romany =

Egyptologist and documentarian

- Romany standing in front of the Sphinx in 2013
- Born: Cairo, Egypt
- Occupations: Documentarian; TV host; DGA director

Ramy Romany is an Egyptologist, documentarian, TV host and Directors Guild of America (DGA) director, active since 2011. He has filmed, produced, directed, and been featured in more than a hundred documentaries, and has worked with networks such as The Discovery Channel, The History Channel, and National Geographic.

== Biography ==
Romany was born in Cairo, Egypt. He moved to Los Angeles in 2011 due to the political situation in Egypt. Between 2013 and 2018, he won 9 EMMY Awards for his work on Esperanza (2013), Visioneer (2015), Return to Esperanza (2016), A New Leash on Life: The K9s for Warriors Story (2018), and Rudy Ruettiger: The Walk On (2018).

Romany has directed multiple productions in different genres, including: The Contender, a boxing competition series for MGM on EPIX; Unprotected Sets; Operation Toussaint, which follows a former U.S. special agent who goes undercover to rescue victims of sex trafficking; and several commercials.

While working on The Contender, Romany, colorist Dean Perme, and Jason Hafer created a custom 3D LUT to give the show a "period feel that felt like film", which supported the cinematic approach that Romany took with his directing. In March 2019, it was announced that Romany would serve as executive producer and host of the new Discovery Channel series Mummies Unwrapped. The series featured Romany traveling to ancient Egyptian tombs, Mayan mass graves, and hidden crypts to uncover the legends, myths, curses and cover-ups of the ancient past. He used cutting-edge technologies to introduce new theories about how ancient civilizations lived and died, and to uncover the origin of each mummy.

== Works (TV, film, and books) ==
- Making The Cut for Amazon Network
- Destination Truth for the SyFy Network
- Conspired: The Evil One Shall Not Live Again
- Brew Masters for The Discovery Channel
- Ancient Aliens for The History Channel
- What Lies Beneath for BBC TV
- Long Way Down for National Geographic
- The Contender for MGM on EPIX
- Operation Toussaint for Amazon Prime
- Expedition Unknown: Egypt Live for The Discovery Channel
- Mummies Unwrapped for the Discovery Channel
- Unprotected Sets for MGM on EPIX
- Esperanza
- Visioneer
- Return to Esperanza
- A New Leash on Life: The K9s for Warriors Story
- Rudy Ruettiger: The Walk On
- Patterns of Evidence
