= The Rice Brothers 2 =

The Rice Brothers

Studio album by The Rice Brothers
- Released: 1994
- Genre: Americana, bluegrass, folk
- Label: Rounder
- Producer: Tony Rice

Tony Rice chronology
Tony Rice Plays and Sings Bluegrass (1993)	The Rice Brothers (1994)	Crossings (1994)

Professional ratings
Review scores
Source	Rating
Allmusic	4.5/5 stars

The Rice Brothers 2 is follow-up album recorded by guitarist Tony Rice and his brothers Ron, Larry and Wyatt.

== Track listing ==
1. "Walk on Boy" (Mel Tillis, Wayne Walker) 3:14
2. "Jared's Rag" (Wyatt Rice) 3:26
3. "Lonesome Highway" (Jackson, Yates) 3:56
4. "That's When I'll Stop Loving You" (Larry Rice) 2:31
5. "Road to Columbus" (Kenny Baker, Bill Monroe) 3:02
6. "Darcy Farrow" (Tom Campbell, Steve Gillette) 3:59
7. "Sawing on the Strings" (Trad.) 2:09
8. "All That You Ask" (Goss) 4:19
9. "Bill Cheatham" (Trad.) 2:10
10. "Old Time Riverboat Man" (Hartford) 4:06
11. "Buttons and Bows" (Jay Livingston) 3:17
12. "Southern Accents" (Tom Petty) 3:59

== Personnel ==
- Tony Rice – guitar, vocals
- Wyatt Rice – guitar
- Larry Rice – mandolin, vocals
- Ron Rice – bass
- Bill Emerson – banjo, vocals
- Frank Poindexter – Dobro
- Jerry Douglas – Dobro
- Rickie Simpkins – violin, viola
- Jon Carroll – piano, vocals
