= David Dowler =

Convicted American serial killer

- Born: David Albert Dowler; 1953 (age 72–73); Albuquerque, New Mexico, U.S.
- Conviction: Murder
- Penalty: Life imprisonment

Details
- Victims: 3 (one conviction)
- Span of crimes: 1983–1987
- Country: United States
- State: Texas
- Date apprehended: August 20, 1987
- Imprisoned at: Clements Unit

David Albert Dowler (born 1953) is an American serial killer who poisoned three acquaintances in Odessa, Texas, with chloroform and cyanide between 1983 and 1987. Convicted of a single murder, he was sentenced to life imprisonment in 1988.

== Early life ==
David Dowler was born in 1953 in Albuquerque, New Mexico, the elder son of an USAF colonel and his Japanese wife. Described as a caring boy by family members, David attended the Sandia High School, where he was an above average student, taking part in the wrestling team and in karate, earning a black belt. According to his brother Will, Dowler had a keen interest in electronics and especially ham radio, and on one occasion even aided communication between law enforcement and firemen after a riot had destroyed telephone lines in Albuquerque. After graduating from school, he enrolled in the University of New Mexico, where he took courses in electrical engineering, physics, chemistry and mathematics, but failed to graduate. In 1976, he married a woman named Janet, with whom he had two daughters. In the early 1980s, they moved to Midland, Texas, where David took a job as a sales representative at Daniel Industries. While working there, he met Lisa Blythe Krieg, and not long after, he became friends with Leza Chandler, a teacher in Odessa's Permian High School and Crockett's Junior High School, and Juan Antonio "Tony" Casillas, Chandler's ex-husband. David would later go on to establish a photo processing business with Casillas, which was based in Odessa.

== Murders ==
On August 16, 1983, the 26-year-old Lisa Krieg was found dead in her home. During the subsequent autopsy performed on the body, it was discovered that she had been suffering from anorexia, but had trouble determining whether that was the cause of death. Peculiarly, on that same day, Dowler phoned Lisa's ex-husband, Tim, explaining to him that his wife had killed herself with cyanide he had given her. In addition, he also said to have cleaned her so her death would "look natural". On several previous occasions, David, who claimed to be an undercover FBI agent in partnership with Lisa, had allegedly saved her life from assassins sent to end Mrs. Krieg's life after a government-sponsored operation, and to have even killed them in retaliation. At the time, Tim Krieg contacted the FBI to ask whether Dowler's claims were true, but received no response. Afraid that he would be deemed insane, he didn't notify police about Dowler's suspicious behavior.

On February 12, 1986, the 28-year-old Casillas' body was found at his home in Odessa. Like with Krieg years earlier, cyanide was found in his body, as well as small traces of poppers, which were usually used for muscle relaxation. Unable to determine the exact cause of death, Casillas' body was preserved for extra testing. On June 29, 1987, the 29-year-old Leza Chandler was found dead at her home by her friend Kerri Dawn Middleton, who was visiting from Midland. The autopsy determined that she had died from acute chloroform poisoning, likely in a homicidal manner. They investigated her past, discovering that Chandler and several friends, among whom was Dowler, often gathered at her house and inhaled chloroform so they could talk about their problems in a relaxed state. After hearing rumors that she may have had an affair with David, officers were sent in to question him, leading to his eventual arrest for Chandler's death.

== Trial and imprisonment ==
In September 1987, Dowler was indicted for the death of Leza Chandler, in addition to being charged with carrying two illegal sound suppressors, with a bail bond set at $100,000. While they were gathering evidence to build a case against the accused poisoner, authorities also investigated the suspicious deaths of three acquaintances of Dowler's, among whom was 29-year-old Kathy Hicks, who collapsed at an arts and crafts show held in the Ector County Coliseum in 1986. The arrest came as a shock to both his family members and relatives, who expressed their disbelief that David was a murderer, claiming that he was a gentle soul who wouldn't hurt a fly and that he was likely framed. On December 30, 1987, Dowler was officially indicted for Casillas' and Krieg's deaths by the grand jury. Hicks' deaths was later determined to be caused by heart problems, and thus unrelated to the other deaths.

At the trial, detectives testified at a pretrial hearing that they had located two empty bottles of chloroform in two-pint bottles while searching through Dowler's West Louisiana Street residence. Dowler's defense attorney, Thomas Hirsch, queried about what exact evidence the prosecution had that their client had poisoned Chandler, to which Det. Mickey Brown replied that there was none aside from what was presented already. According to Hirsch, the chemicals found at the Dowler residence was used to make fireworks, and instead, that it was likely Chandler's ex-husband, Kyle, who had killed her. Pat Carter, who worked from time to time in David's shop, also testified that while he had seen friends use chloroform, he had never seen Dowler himself administer it to anyone. On the prosecution's side, Dr. Juan Garcia, a psychiatrist, testified that Mr. Chandler only suffered from depression and was not a violent individual, and Tim Krieg, who until then had remained silent on the matters, testified about Dowler's calls following his ex-wife's death. On January 28, 1988, David Dowler was found guilty in the murder of Leza Chandler, and sentenced to life imprisonment with a chance of parole. At the end of the trial, District Attorney Eric Augesen called him a vicious murderer and a cruel manipulator who liked control and to snuff out human life.

== See also ==
- List of serial killers in the United States
