= Mohanad Elshieky =

Libyan comedian

- Born: Mohanad Elshieky; March 14, 1991 (age 35); Benghazi, Libya

Comedy career
- Years active: 2016–present
- Website: Official site

Mohanad Elshieky is a Libyan stand up comedian based in Queens who also served as a digital producer on the TBS late-night comedy series Full Frontal with Samantha Bee and has appeared on Conan and The Late Show with Stephen Colbert.

== Early life ==
Elshieky was born in Benghazi, Libya. He taught English classes in Benghazi where he met Ambassador J. Christopher Stevens. He also worked as a translator and photographer after the start of the Civil War and hosted an English-language radio program. Due to his work for these outlets, he was targeted by Islamic militias during the period after the overthrow of Muammar Gaddafi. In 2014, he moved to Portland in the United States as part of a Department of State exchange program at Portland State University. However, his family began receiving death threats, and Elshieky applied for asylum in the United States. He was eventually granted asylum status in October 2018. He earned a business degree from Portland State with a concentration in supply management. While traveling by Greyhound Bus in January 2019, he was briefly detained by U.S. Customs and Border Protection agents who accused him of being in the United States illegally. Elshieky later detailed his experience in a Twitter thread that went viral and was picked up by several news organizations. Mohanad is married to Zainab Khan as of January 31, 2025.

== Career ==
Elshieky began his career in comedy when he hosted a comedic political call-in radio show in Benghazi, but the radio station was burned down after the jokes offended local Islamic groups. He first began performing stand up comedy while he was studying business at Portland State. He then moved to hosting the weekly Earthquake Hurricane comedy show at Ford Food and Drink. In 2018, he performed on Pop-Up Magazine's live tour and Thrillist named him as Oregon's "best undiscovered stand up comedian". Elshieky has performed stand up at Revolution Hall, Hollywood Theatre, The Comedy Store, Nourse Theater and Benaroya Hall. In 2019, Elshieky moved to New York City and began working for Full Frontal. Elshieky has appeared on television series like Unprotected Sets and Conan and has performed a set on Comedy Central. Elshieky has guest starred on comedy podcasts like Harmontown, Yo, Is This Racist? and Lovett or Leave It. His first standup special No Need to Address Me was released by Comedy Dynamics in 2025.
