= Mark Johnson (musician) =

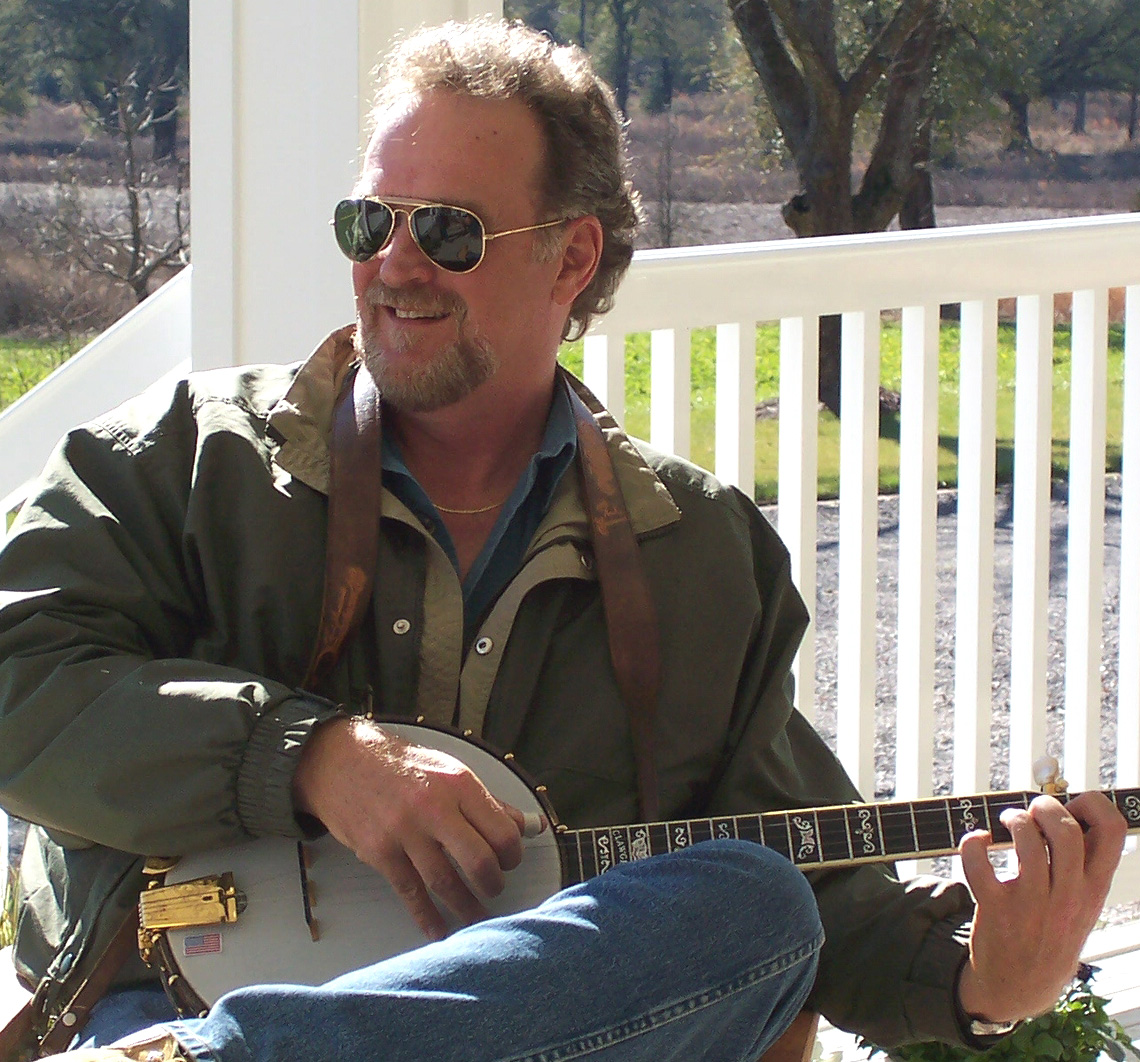
- Mark Johnson

Background information
- Born: Mark Stephen Johnson; May 20, 1955 (age 70); Yorktown Heights, New York, United States
- Genres: Americana, bluegrass, folk
- Occupations: Musician, Songwriter, Composer
- Instrument: Banjo
- Years active: 1981–present
- Labels: Pinecastle, Mountain Home, Bangtown Records

Mark Johnson (born May 20, 1955) is an American banjoist credited with creating a style of five string banjo playing called Clawgrass, which incorporates bluegrass and clawhammer banjo styles as well as bluegrass guitar styles and bluegrass ensemble techniques. He, along with Emory Lester was nominated by the International Bluegrass Music Association (IBMA) for a 2007 Instrumental Album of the Year award. and presented with the 2012 Steve Martin Prize for Excellence in Banjo and Bluegrass. He is a spokesman for the Deering Banjo Co., which named two Clawgrass model banjos after him.

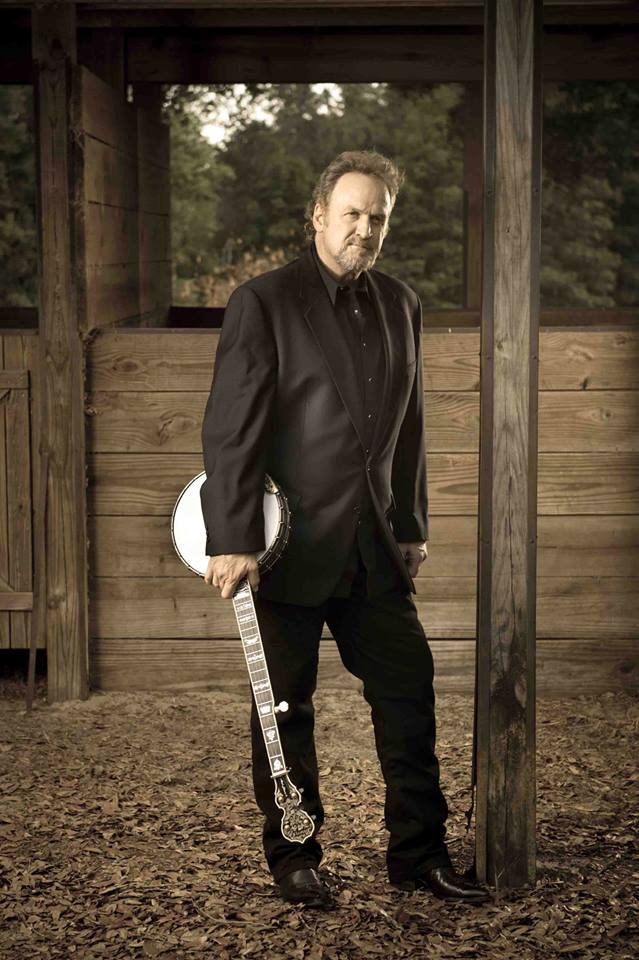
Mark Johnson, Dunnellon, FL

== Early life and education ==
Johnson was raised in Yorktown Heights, New York and started playing banjo at the age of 15. In 1971, he began his first banjo lessons with Jay Ungar in Garrison, NY. While studying with Ungar he learned the "Frailing Style" of five string banjo playing. Johnson is self taught in the Scruggs and Melodic style of bluegrass banjo playing.

== Career ==
Johnson moved to Crystal River, FL in 1981 to work as a contract Health Physics Technician at a local electric utility. It is there that he met Herb Rice, Larry Rice and Ronnie Rice. The Rice family included him in their musical activities, where Johnson began to apply and adjust his clawhammer banjo techniques to work in bluegrass and duet playing ensembles.

Johnson continued to work with Tony and Larry Rice from 1984 to 1993. It was during this time that Tony Rice taught Johnson critical techniques in performance art, writing, creating music and recording. This led to recording several duets and bluegrass ensemble covers and original compositions on Johnson's first self- produced CD entitled Clawgrass - Mark Johnson with The Rice Brothers and Friends on the Bang label in 1994.

Johnson later performed extensively with mandolinist Emory Lester. The duo released their first album, Acoustic Campaign, in 2002, and over the years have released four more albums together.

In 2012, while working during the week as emergency management director in Florida, Johnson was presented with the Steve Martin Prize for Excellence in Banjo and Bluegrass. The next year he released an album, 1863, with Emory Lester.

In 2017, Johnson and banjoist Mike Snider performed together at the Grand Ole Opry in Nashville.

== Awards ==
- Steve Martin Prize for Excellence in Banjo and Bluegrass, 2012.
- Nominated for a 2007 International Bluegrass Music Award for Instrumental Album of the Year for their CD, Acoustic Rising.

== Discography ==
Year	Title	Label
1994	Clawgrass Mark Johnson with the Rice Brothers and Friends	Bang 1
1998	Mark Johnson & Clawgrass - Bridging the Gap	Pinecastle
2002	Mark Johnson & Emory Lester -Acoustic Campaign	Bangtown Records
2006	Mark Johnson & Emory Lester -Acoustic Rising	Mountain Home
2010	Mark Johnson & Emory Lester -Acoustic Vision	Bangtown Records
2013	Mark Johnson & Emory Lester -1863	Bangtown Records
2017	Mark Johnson & Emory Lester -Acoustic Milestones (20 Years)	Bangtown Records
