= The Underground Comedy Movie =

- DVD cover
- Directed by: Vince Offer
- Written by: Vince Offer; Dante
- Produced by: Maria Levin; Jeff Jaeger; Mark Shlomi
- Starring: Vince Offer; Slash; Michael Clarke Duncan; Gena Lee Nolin; Joey Buttafuoco
- Cinematography: Michael Hofstein
- Edited by: Vince Offer; Luis Ruiz
- Music by: NOFX; Guttermouth
- Distributed by: Phaedra Cinema
- Release date: May 14, 1999
- Running time: 88 minutes
- Country: United States
- Language: English
- Budget: $500,000
- Box office: $856

The Underground Comedy Movie is a 1999 film directed by and starring Vince Offer. Alongside short comedy sketches it features music by NOFX and Guttermouth, among others. It is considered by some as one of the worst films of all time.

== Synopsis ==
The film mainly consists of skits featuring celebrities in various roles, based on concepts Offer had originally performed on a public-access television show he had hosted. Skits included Gena Lee Nolin posing as Marilyn Monroe, supermodels loudly using the restroom, and a superhero named "Dickman" who dressed in a penis costume and defeated his enemies by squirting them with semen.

== Cast ==
Supermodels Taking a Dump

- Barbara Snellenburg as Supermodel #1
- Rebecca Chaney as Supermodel #2

Bat Man

- Gloria Sperling as Old Lady
- Sam Costello as Security Guard
- Chris Watson as Rhymer
- Vince Offer as Batman

Boobwatch

- Karen Black as Mother
- Brian Van Holt as Lifeguard

Virgin Hunter

- Lightfield Lewis as Virgin Hunter
- Barbara Snellenburg as Virgin

Gay Virgin

- Ant as Gay Man
- Michael Clarke Duncan as Gay Virgin

I Hate L.A.

- Vince Offer, David Rotter, and Danny Rotter as Singers
- Jeffrey Jaeger as Transvestite

The Godmother

- Michael "Wheels" Parisi as Godmother
- Joey Buttafuoco as Sonny
- Vince Offer as Fetus Salesman

The Adventures of Dickman

- Peachy Keene as Lesbian #1
- Melanie Pullen as Lesbian #2
- Rebecca Chaney as Lesbian #3

Watts Up Talk Show

- Vince Offer as JJ Cool
- Morgan Alvet as KKK

Psychology Today

- Zoska Myock as Patient
- Michael "Wheels" Parisi as Psychologist

Beautiful Girl With Old Man

- Barbara Snellenburg as Beautiful Girl
- George Smity as Old Man

Miss America Bag Lady Pageant

- Slash as Host
- Rebecca Chaney as Co-host

Flirty Harry

- Tony Vera as Bad Guy
- Vince Offer as Flirty

Porno Review

- Bobby Lee as Chinese Man
- Paolo Scandarisi as Arnold Swollenpecker
- Sam Costell as Mailman
- Vince Offer as Vincenzo Butafungu
- Sam Mactaggert as Spanky Shvatsa
- Joe Shapiro as Man-goo Man/Tutu Girl

Jury Making Right Decision

- Jerry "Mongo" Brown as Black Juror #1
- Ella Mae Davis as Black Juror # 2
- Mike Boito as White Juror #1
- Lightfield Lewis as White Juror #2

Marilyn Monroe

- Gena Lee Nolin as Marilyn
- Sam Costello as Bystander #1
- Joe Shapiro as Bystander #2

== Production ==
Although production began in 1996 and the film was released and screened in 1999, Offer was bankrupt by 2002 and home video distribution plans were shelved. Offer, who had previously been a successful vegetable chopper salesman and businessman, resumed selling vegetable choppers at swap meets to support himself and raise money to complete his film project. Within a few months, he had earned enough to resume production, and the movie was finally completed, released, and marketed entirely on late-night infomercials that Offer paid for with his earnings from the swap meet vegetable chopper sales.

The film has reportedly sold in excess of 100,000 copies.

== Reception ==
According to IMDb, The Underground Comedy Movie played on one movie theater screen on May 16, 1999, earning $856.

The film earned less-than-favorable reviews, receiving a 33% from Rotten Tomatoes based on 6 reviews. The New York Post said it "may be the least amusing comedy ever made." Lawrence Van Gelder of The New York Times offered a scathing review, describing the movie as "a series of sketches built around subjects like masturbation, defecation, alienation, urination, necrophilia, voyeurism, casual brutality, and mockery of the unfortunate." Van Gelder added that tasteless or offensive material can be funny in the right hands, but that Offer "makes the common mistake of equating the recognition of comic potential for comedy itself. For the successful, talent bridges the gap, but, here, [talent] is absent."

== Lawsuits ==
The film was the subject of several lawsuits filed by Offer against others. On September 23, 1998, Vince Offer filed a suit against 20th Century Fox and the co-directors of There's Something About Mary, Bobby and Peter Farrelly. Offer claimed that 14 scenes in Mary were lifted from his film. The Farrellys released this statement: "We've never heard of him, we've never heard of his movie, and it's all a bunch of baloney." The case was dismissed with prejudice on a motion for summary judgment by order of the court in 2000, and 20th Century Fox was awarded $66,336.92 in attorneys' fees.

In 2000, Offer successfully sued Anna Nicole Smith for $4 million, claiming that Smith had agreed to be in his movie, but backed out in 1996 over fears that appearing in the movie would be detrimental to her career. Offer claimed that as a result of her backing out of the film, the crew lost $100,000.

In 2004, Offer sent out a press release through prnews.com announcing his intention to sue the Church of Scientology. In 1997, while production was ongoing, the Church of Scientology had allegedly begun a large-scale smear campaign against Offer and his film (Offer was a Scientologist at the time). The director claimed the Scientologists' "Celebrity Center" in Hollywood labeled him a "criminal" (based on the rules of Scientology) and threatened his Scientology friends in the movie business with "condemnation" punishment that could be lethal to their careers if they did not write malicious reports against Offer.

== Sequel ==
In June 2010, it was revealed that Offer had completed filming of scenes starring Lindsay Lohan and model Joanna Krupa for a follow-up movie. The film was released in 2013 with the title InAPPropriate Comedy.
