= Sandy Point, Texas =

City in Brazoria County, Texas, United States

- City
- Location within Texas
- Coordinates: 29°23′08″N 95°28′52″W
- Country: United States
- State: Texas
- County: Brazoria
- Incorporated: 2012

Area
  - Total: 1.74 sq mi (4.50 km^{2})
  - Land: 1.74 sq mi (4.50 km^{2})
  - Water: 0 sq mi (0.00 km^{2})
- Elevation: 56 ft (17 m)

Population (2020)
  - Total: 207
  - Density: 119/sq mi (46.0/km^{2})
- Time zone: UTC-6 (Central (CST))
  - Summer (DST): UTC-5 (CDT)
- ZIP code: 77583
- Area codes: 281, 832
- FIPS code: 48-65345
- GNIS feature ID: 1346604

Sandy Point is a city on Farm to Market Road 521 (FM 521) in north central Brazoria County, Texas, United States. The small community is located near a state prison. In the 19th century, the settlement served nearby sugar cane and cotton plantations. Sandy Point's post office, school and railroad have disappeared, but there were two churches in the community in December 2013. The population was 207 at the 2020 census.

== History ==
Sandy Point incorporated in 2012 to avoid annexation from Missouri City. In 2015, Missouri City agreed to recognize the incorporation of Sandy Point.

== Government and infrastructure ==
The Rosharon Volunteer Fire Department provides fire services for Sandy Point.

Sandy Point is located at the entrance to the Memorial Unit (formerly Darrington Unit), a prison for men operated by the Texas Department of Criminal Justice. A portion of Memorial Unit is within the Sandy Point city limits.

== Demographics ==
Historical population
Census	Pop.	Note	%±
2020	207		—
2020 Census

=== 2020 census ===
As of the 2020 census, Sandy Point had a population of 207. The median age was 40.8 years. 23.7% of residents were under the age of 18 and 19.3% of residents were 65 years of age or older. For every 100 females there were 93.5 males, and for every 100 females age 18 and over there were 83.7 males age 18 and over.

0.0% of residents lived in urban areas, while 100.0% lived in rural areas.

There were 77 households in Sandy Point, of which 39.0% had children under the age of 18 living in them. Of all households, 46.8% were married-couple households, 15.6% were households with a male householder and no spouse or partner present, and 29.9% were households with a female householder and no spouse or partner present. About 19.5% of all households were made up of individuals and 7.8% had someone living alone who was 65 years of age or older.

There were 92 housing units, of which 16.3% were vacant. The homeowner vacancy rate was 0.0% and the rental vacancy rate was 0.0%.

Racial composition as of the 2020 census
Race	Number	Percent
White	108	52.2%
Black or African American	44	21.3%
American Indian and Alaska Native	0	0.0%
Asian	7	3.4%
Native Hawaiian and Other Pacific Islander	0	0.0%
Some other race	6	2.9%
Two or more races	42	20.3%
Hispanic or Latino (of any race)	47	22.7%

== Education ==
Students in Sandy Point are served by the Angleton Independent School District, including Angleton High School. In the 2013–2014 school year, the Angleton ISD served the area via Rosharon Zone Bus Route #223.

The Texas Legislature designated portions of Angleton ISD that by September 1, 1995 had not been annexed by Alvin Community College as in the Brazosport College zone. As Sandy Point is not in the maps of Alvin CC, it is in the Brazosport College zone.

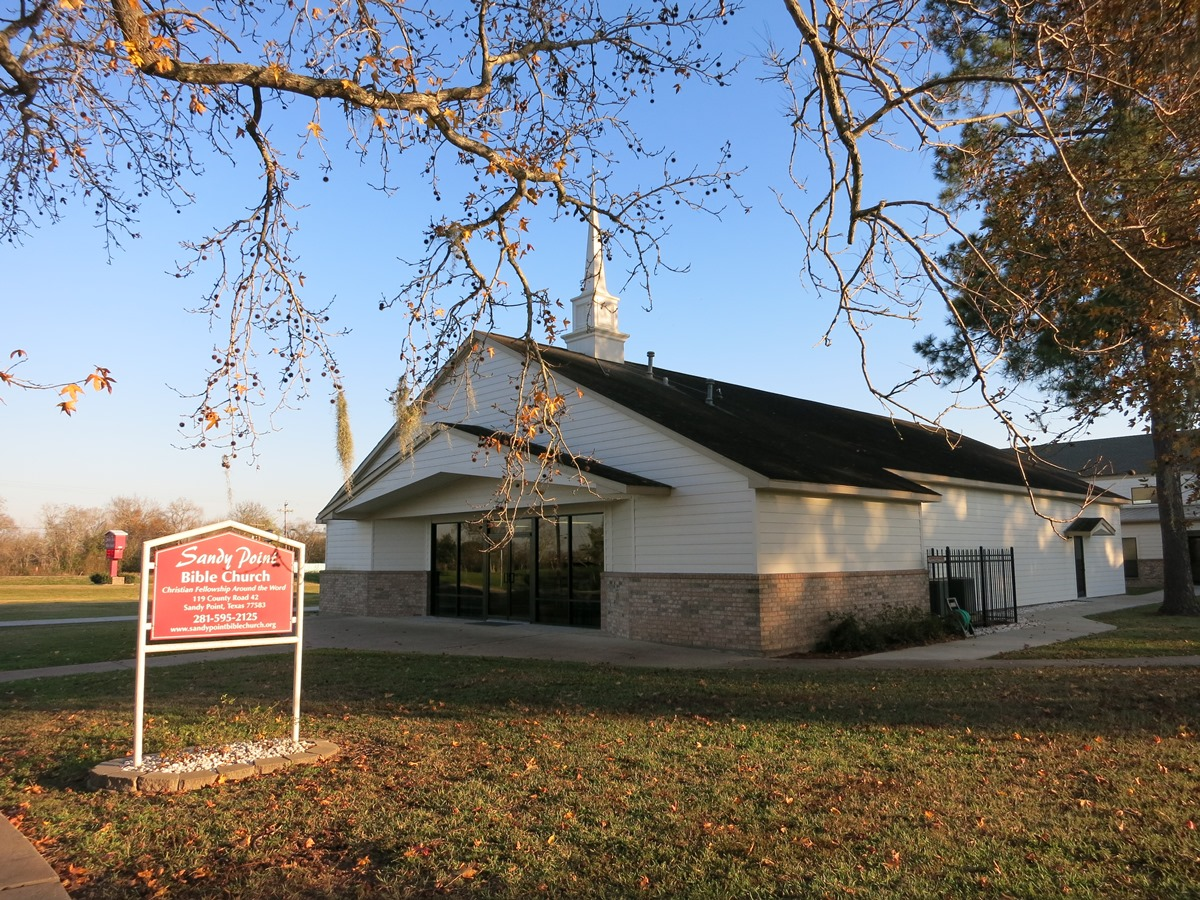
The Sandy Point Bible Church is on County Road 42 just west of FM 521.

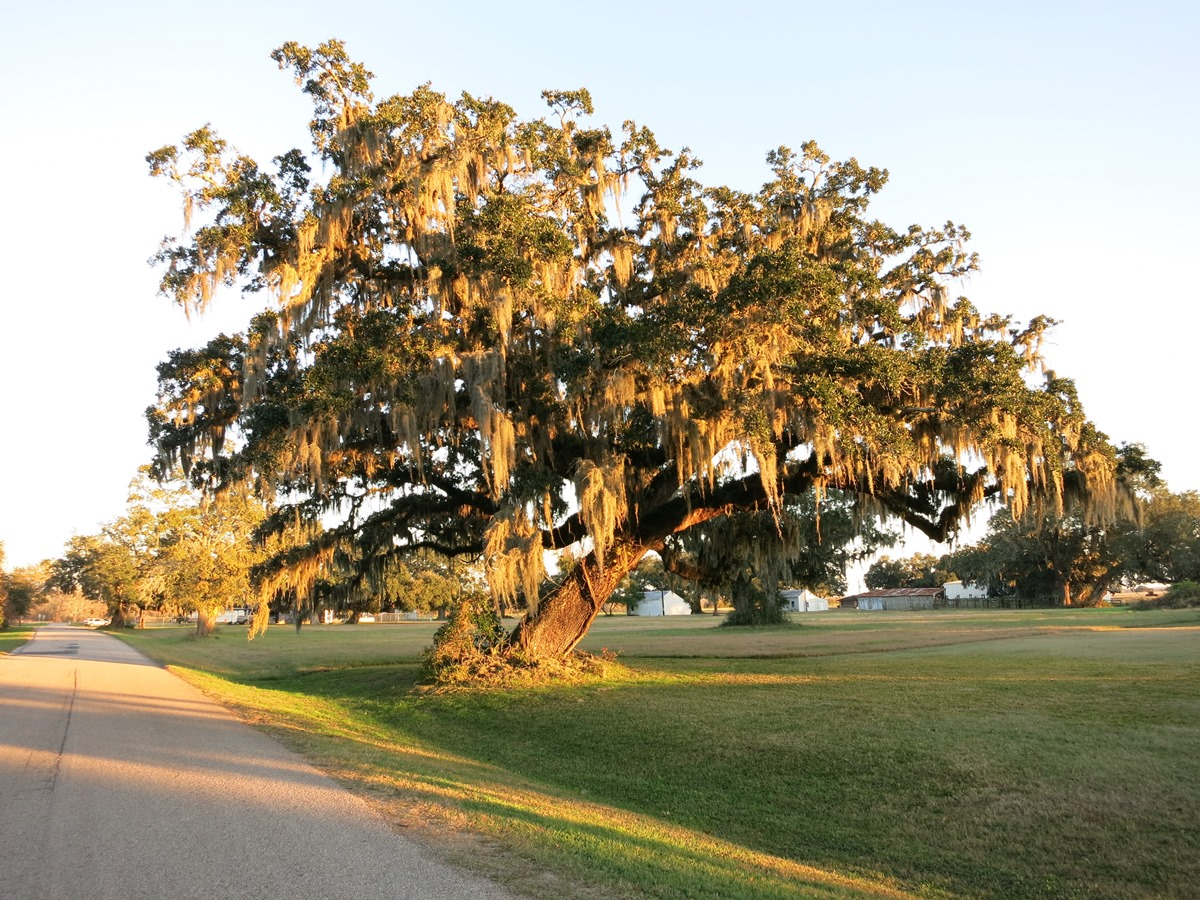
Live oak trees draped with Spanish moss are plentiful near Sandy Point. This one is on County Road 42.

== See also ==
- List of municipalities in Texas
