= Unprotected Sets =

American television series

- Genre: Stand-up comedy
- Directed by: Ramy Romany
- Country of origin: United States
- Original language: English
- No. of seasons: 2
- No. of episodes: 24

Production
- Executive producers: Mark Burnett; Page Hurwitz; Wanda Sykes; Barry Poznick
- Producer: Sharon Houston
- Cinematography: Jason Hafer
- Editor: Ian Kornbluth
- Running time: 22–28 minutes
- Production companies: MGM Television; Push It Productions

Original release
- Network: Epix
- Release: October 5, 2018 – March 25, 2022

Unprotected Sets is an American stand-up comedy television series on Epix. It ran for 24 episodes across three seasons from October 5, 2018, to March 25, 2022.

== Premise ==
Unprotected Sets films in Portland, San Diego, Washington, D.C., Minneapolis, and Atlanta with each episode presenting "a compelling portrait of a comedian on the verge of breaking out to become the next big name in comedy. The diverse lineup of breakout talent offers insights into the motivations behind baring one’s soul for a living. Their dynamic, personal, and hilarious performances – where nothing is off limits – will show us exactly how, in their own inimitable way, each comedian turns life into art."

== Production ==
On August 16, 2018, it was announced that Epix had given the production a series order for a first season consisting of twelve episodes set to premiere on October 5, 2018. Executive producers were expected to include Wanda Sykes, Page Hurwitz, and Barry Poznick. Production companies were slated to consist of Push It Productions and MGM Television.

== Episodes ==
Season	Episodes	Originally released	
Season	Episodes	First released	Last released
1	12	October 5, 2018	December 21, 2018
2	12	October 17, 2020	March 13, 2021
3	8	February 4, 2022	March 25, 2022

=== Season 1 (2018) ===
No.	Title	Original release date
1	"Zainab Johnson"	October 5, 2018
2	"Raul Sanchez"	October 12, 2018
3	"Daniel Webb"	October 19, 2018
4	"Rocky Dale Davis"	October 26, 2018
5	"Mia Jackson"	November 2, 2018
6	"Rob Christensen"	November 9, 2018
7	"Becky Braunstein"	November 16, 2018
8	"Mohanad Elshieky"	November 23, 2018
9	"Paris Sashay"	November 30, 2018
10	"Shane Mauss"	December 7, 2018
11	"Jessa Reed"	December 14, 2018
12	"Scout Durwood"	December 21, 2018

=== Season 2 (2020-21) ===
No. overall	No. in season	Title	Original release date
13	1	"Calvin Evans & Hanna Dickinson"	October 17, 2020
14	2	"Kira Soltanovich & Mike Vecchione"	October 24, 2020
15	3	"Corey Rodrigues & Steph Tolev"	October 31, 2020
16	4	"Kabir Singh & Kellen Erskine"	November 7, 2020
17	5	"Rita Brent & Dave Waite"	November 14, 2020
18	6	"Jared Logan & Clayton English"	November 21, 2020
19	7	"Leonard Ouzts & Arlo Weierhauser"	February 6, 2021
20	8	"Julian McCullough & Amy Miller"	February 13, 2021
21	9	"Debra DiGiovanni & Blaq Ron"	February 20, 2021
22	10	"Kelsey Cook & Kiry Shabazz"	February 27, 2021
23	11	"Marlena Rodriguez & Ali Sultan"	March 6, 2021
24	12	"Seaton Smith & Yedoye Travis"	March 13, 2021

=== Season 3 (2022) ===
No. overall	No. in season	Title	Original release date
25	1	"Chad Daniels"	February 4, 2022
26	2	"Ronnie Jordan"	February 11, 2022
27	3	"Lynne Koplitz"	February 18, 2022
28	4	"Ali Siddiq"	February 25, 2022
29	5	"Tom Thakkar"	March 4, 2022
30	6	"Chanel Ali"	March 11, 2022
31	7	"Emma Willmann"	March 18, 2022
32	8	"Louis Katz"	March 25, 2022
