= Ruben M. Torres Unit =

Prison in Texas, United States

Coordinates: 29°21′08″N 99°11′48″W

- Interactive map of Ruben M. Torres Unit
- Location: 125 Private Road 4303 Hondo, Texas
- Status: open
- Security class: G1, G2, G4
- Capacity: 1384
- Opened: January 1993
- Managed by: Texas Department of Criminal Justice

The Ruben M. Torres Unit is a state prison for men located in Hondo, Medina County, Texas, owned and operated by the Texas Department of Criminal Justice. This facility was opened in January 1993, and a maximum capacity of 1384 male inmates held at various security levels.

Stand-up comedian Ali Siddiq was incarcerated there.
