= Brandt Tobler =

American stand-up comedian, author, actor and podcaster

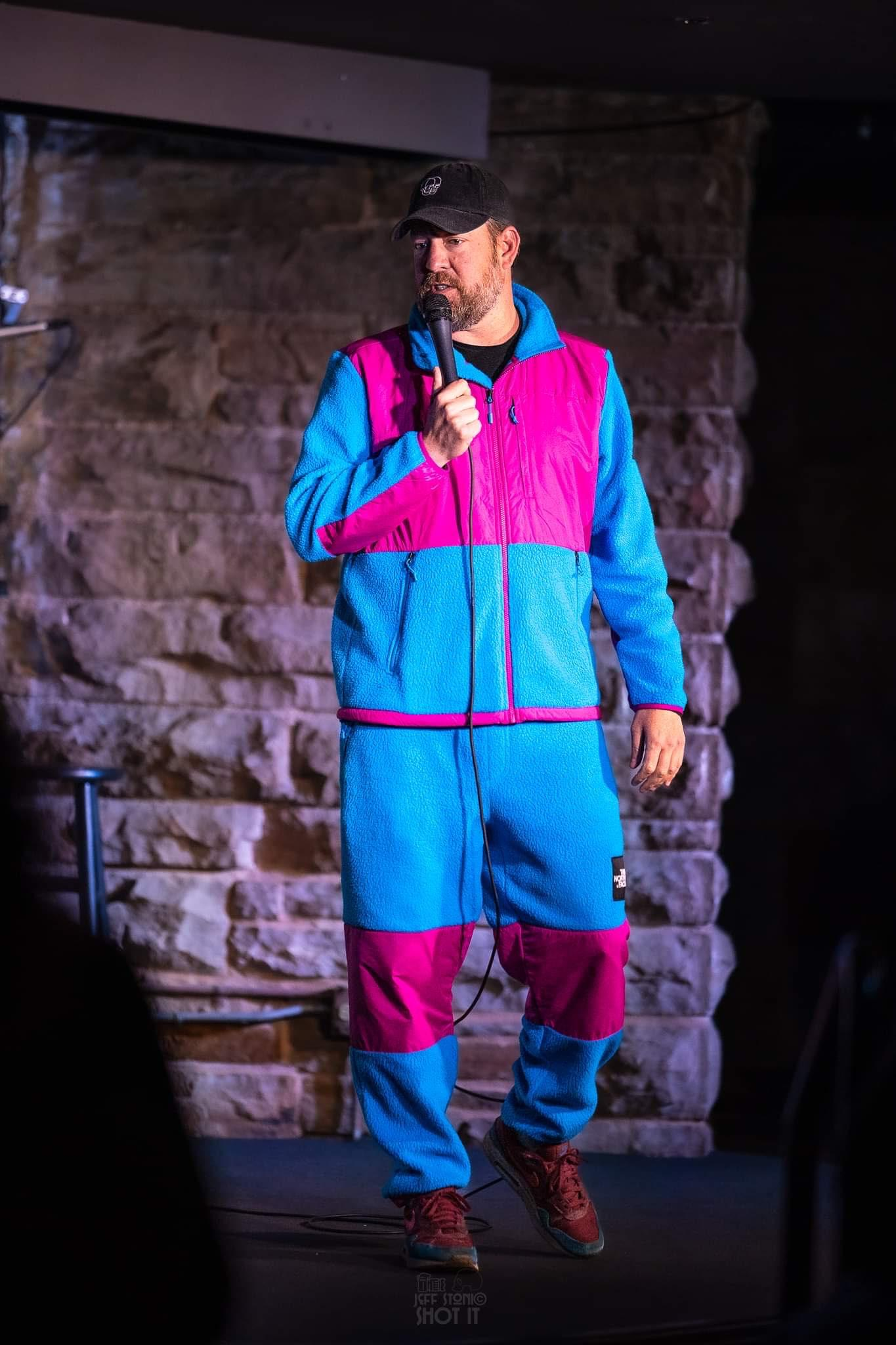
Comedian Brandt Tobler

Brandt Tobler is an American stand-up comedian, author, actor, and podcaster.

== Early life ==
Tobler was born and raised in Cheyenne, Wyoming. His father was sent away to “college” numerous times throughout his childhood, and it wasn’t until his teenage years that he realized his dad was actually in and out of prison for over a decade. Tobler attended Cheyenne Central High School.

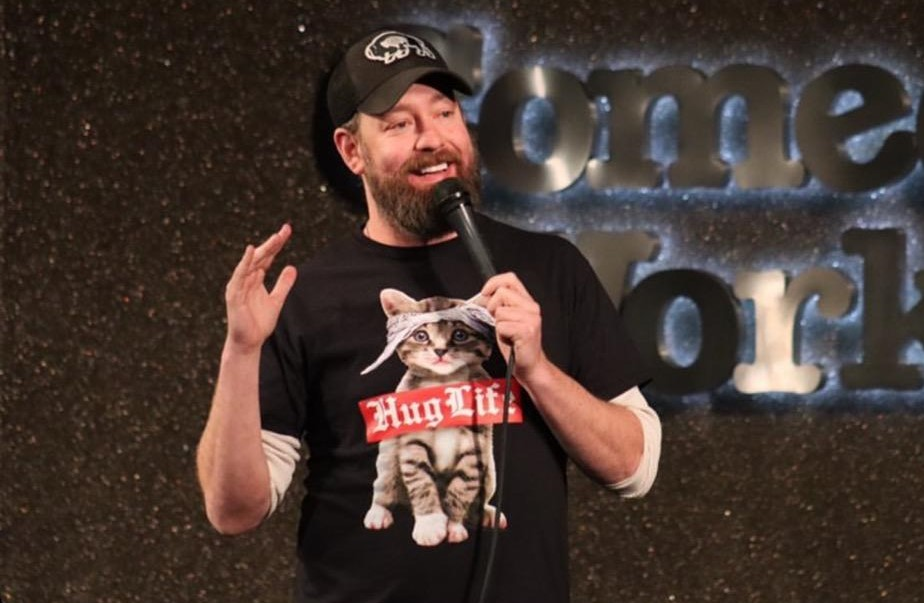
Comedian Brandt Tobler

== Career ==
Tobler moved to Las Vegas, Nevada in 2005, in part to start a relationship with his father. Tobler worked odd jobs, including one as a "runner" delivering bets for professional gamblers. He began performing stand-up in local dive bars and was eventually named "Best Undiscovered Comedian from Wyoming." Tobler gained notoriety for launching comedy shows in the backyard of his Las Vegas home, attracting the likes of Tig Notaro, Brody Stevens, Doug Stanhope, Steve Agee and Martha Kelly and drawing audiences in the hundreds. Tobler has since performed in bars and comedy festivals across the country.

In 2017, Tobler appeared on Comedy Central’s This is Not Happening. His story for the show was about the time he tried to kill his dad.

== Personal life ==
Tobler lives in Denver, Colorado.

== Discography ==
• Token White Boy (2010)

• Gamblin’ and Ramblin’… Live in Las Vegas (2018)

== Books ==
• Tobler, Brandt. (2017) Free Roll Self Published. // Audio Book Executive Producer/Director: Lu Valentino ISBN 0998794805.
