= Ari Shaffir =

American comedian (born 1974)

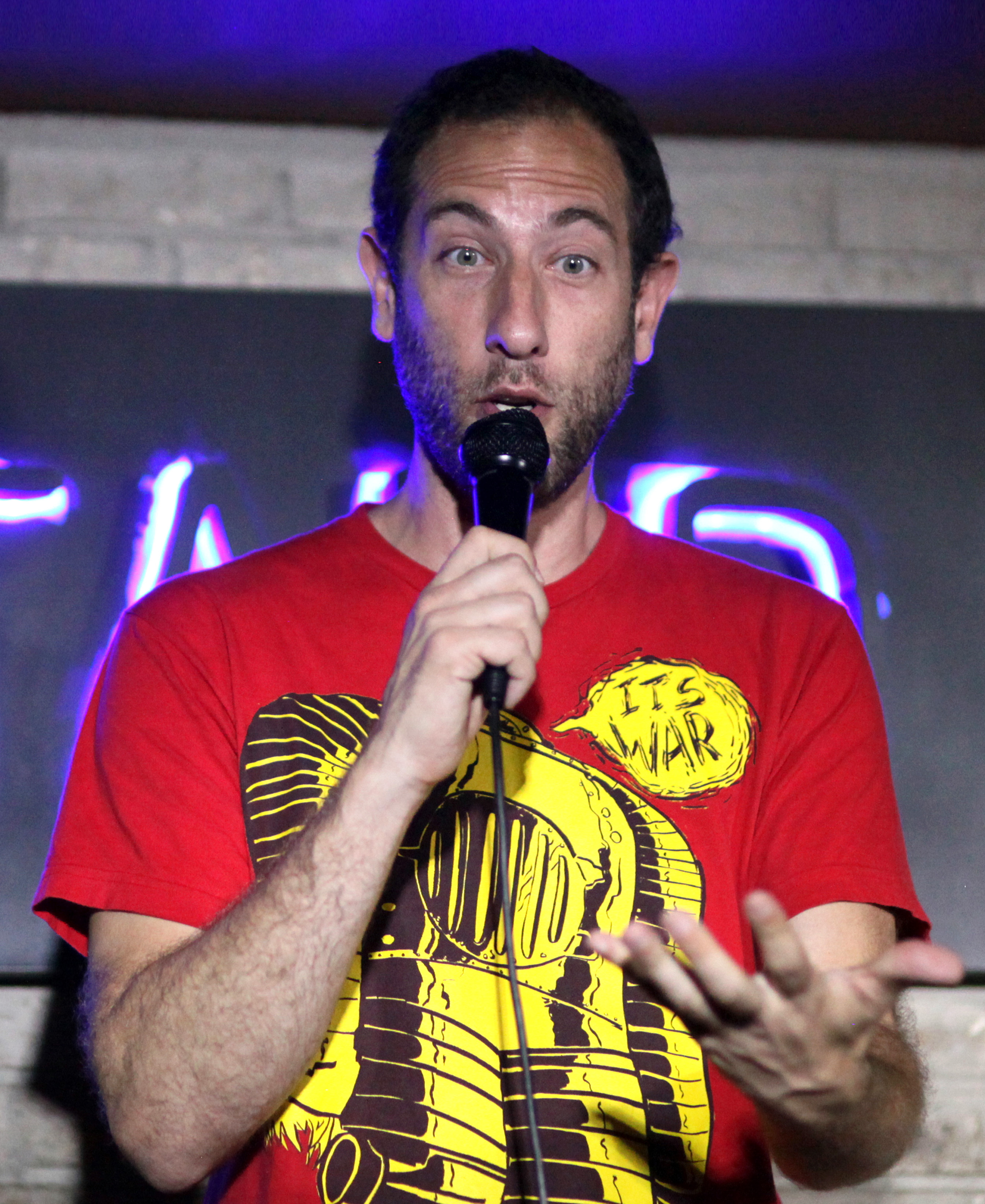
- Shaffir performing in 2016
- Born: New York City, U.S.
- Education: University of Maryland, College Park (BA)

Comedy career
- Years active: 1996–present
- Medium: Stand-up, television, film, podcast, radio
- Website: arishaffir.com

Ari David Shaffir is an American comedian, actor, podcaster, writer, and producer. He produced and hosted the Skeptic Tank podcast from 2010 to 2023. He now hosts the podcast "You Be Trippin'" where he discusses travel experiences and stories. Shaffir also co-hosts the podcast Punch Drunk Sports with Jayson Thibault and Sam Tripoli, and is a regular guest on The Joe Rogan Experience podcast on the "Protect Our Parks" episodes with fellow comedians Shane Gillis and Mark Normand. He created and previously hosted and produced the This is Not Happening television series, an adaptation of his monthly stand-up show.

== Early life ==
Ari David Shaffir was born in New York City to a Jewish family of Romanian descent. His father was a Holocaust survivor. The family followed Conservative Jewish practices until Ari was nine years old, when they moved to Maryland. There, his parents adopted Orthodox Jewish beliefs. When he was 16, he worked at Arlington National Cemetery.

Shaffir attended high school in Rockville, Maryland. He went on to study for two years at a yeshiva in Jerusalem before transferring to the University of Maryland, where he graduated in 1999 with a degree in English literature. Shaffir played on the university's NCAA golf team in 1995 and claims he was the lowest-ranked NCAA athlete.

== Career ==
Shaffir's first and only comedy performance on stage before he moved to Los Angeles took place in his early twenties at an open mic night at a "sports comedy place in Northern Virginia". Following his graduation from university, Shaffir moved to Los Angeles to improve his chances of success as a stand-up comedian. He took up work answering the phones at The Comedy Store, which led to positions in the cover booth and "the door", until owner Mitzi Shore made him a paid regular four and a half years later. His early influences in comedy include watching showcase comedy shows on television and comedians on The Tonight Show with Johnny Carson. He cites Bill Burr as his favorite living comedian.

Shaffir first became known to a wider audience with the viral video series The Amazing Racist. He became an opening act for Joe Rogan in the late 2000s and began touring with Rogan and fellow comics Joey Diaz, Duncan Trussell, Tom Segura, Brian Redban, and Eddie Bravo. In 2009 he appeared at the Montreal Comedy Festival as part of The Nasty Show. The following year he created, produced and hosted the monthly live show This Is Not Happening, with Eric Abrams, a stand-up comedy featuring numerous comedians telling true-life stories around a theme. The show would become a regular feature at comedy festivals and debuted as a web series in 2013 and premiered in January 2015 on Comedy Central. He left the show as producer and host in 2017 after selling his third special, Double Negative, to Netflix rather than Comedy Central. Roy Wood Jr. replaced him as host.

In 2010 Shaffir appeared on the 3rd episode of the Joe Rogan Experience, his first of 59 appearances on the show. In 2011, Shaffir began his podcast, Skeptic Tank. On most episodes, Shaffir picks a subject his guests (mostly comedians) can discuss as experts. While subjects are often comic he's also discussed serious issues such as mental health, suicide, rape, and prison. Every 50 episodes the comedy team Danish and O'Neill appear as guests. In 2013, Shaffir began to cohost the sports podcast Punch Drunk Sports with fellow comedians Sam Tripoli and Jayson Thibault.

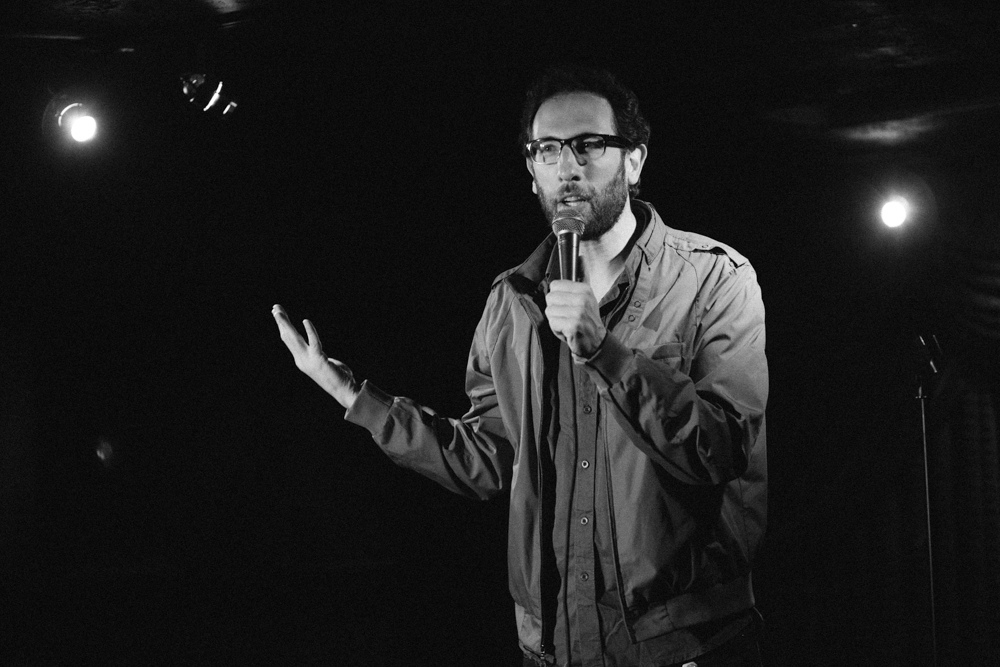
Shaffir performing in 2013

Shaffir spent several years earning a living as a commercial actor, appearing in ads for Coke Zero, Subway, Domino's, and Bud Light. He appeared in the comedy feature film Keeping Up with the Joneses (2016). As of 2017, Shaffir claimed to have no interest in pursuing acting as it could take him away from his stand-up.

Following the death of basketball player Kobe Bryant in 2020, Shaffir caused controversy with a video posted to Twitter in which he stated: "Kobe Bryant died 23 years too late today. He got away with rape because all the Hollywood liberals who attack comedy enjoy rooting for the Lakers more than they dislike rape. Big ups to the hero who forgot to gas up his chopper. I hate the Lakers. What a great day." A New York comedy club where Shaffir was scheduled to perform canceled his performance after it received phone threats.

== Filmography ==
=== Film ===
- The Fax (2004; short film)
- Reeling in Reality (2005)
- Pauly Shore's Natural Born Komics (2007)
- inAPPropriate Comedy (2013)
- Keeping Up with the Joneses (2016)

=== Stand-up specials ===
- Revenge for the Holocaust (2012)
- Passive Aggressive (2013)
- Paid Regular (2015)
- Double Negative (2017)
- Jew (2022)
- America's Sweetheart (2025)

=== Television ===
- Minding the Store (2005; three episodes)
- West Side Stories (2012; television film)
- This Is Not Happening (2013–2017)
- What's Your F@#Cking Deal?!?! (2016)
- The End (2025)
