= Memorial Unit =

Prison in Texas, United States

Memorial Unit (Formerly Darrington)
- Interactive map of Memorial Unit (Formerly Darrington)
- Location: 59 Darrington Road Rosharon, Texas postal address 77583; 29.3995500°N 095.4907500°W
- Status: Operational
- Security class: G1-G5, Administrative Segregation, Outside Trusty, Transient
- Capacity: Unit: 1,610 Trusty Camp: 321
- Opened: 1933
- Former name: Darrington Unit
- Managed by: TDCJ Correctional Institutions Division
- Warden: Bridgette Hayes
- Website: https://www.tdcj.texas.gov/unit_directory/da.html

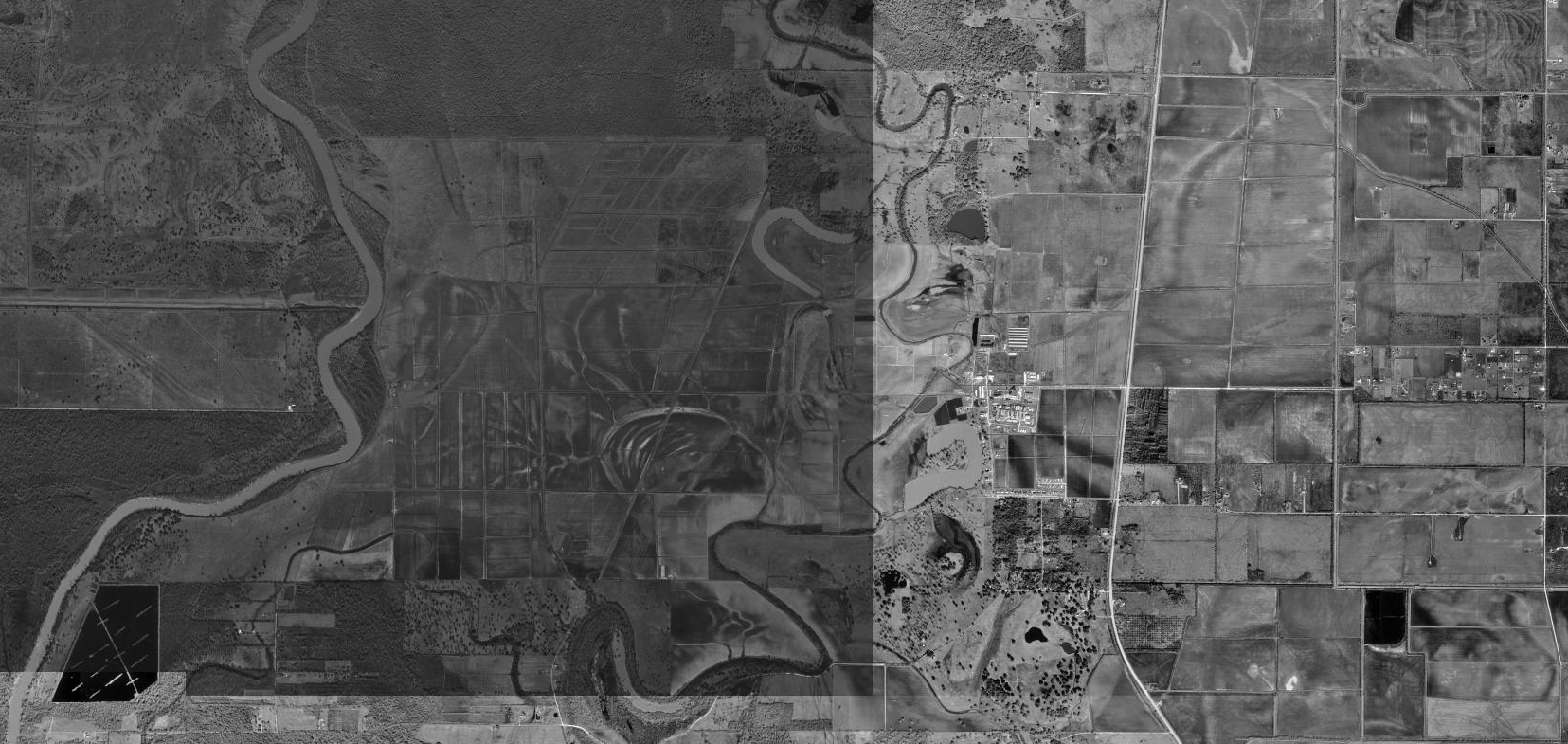
Aerial photograph, U.S. Geological Survey – January 25, 1995

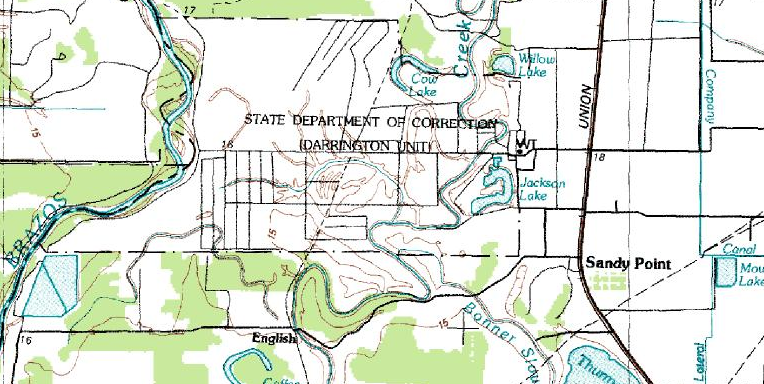
Topographic map, U.S. Geological Survey – July 1, 1984

The Memorial Unit (DA), known as the Darrington Unit until 2023, is a Texas Department of Criminal Justice (TDCJ) men's maximum security prison located in Brazoria County, Texas, with a Rosharon, Texas postal address; it is not inside the Rosharon census-designated place. Most of the unit is in an unincorporated area, while a portion is in the city limits of Sandy Point.

The unit is along Farm to Market Road 521, 4 miles (6.4 km) north of Rosharon, and about 30 miles (48 km) south of Downtown Houston. The prison has about 6,770 acres (2,740 ha) of land. The prison has the Region III Administrative Office of the Windham School District.

== History ==
The prison opened in 1917. It sits on land that was owned by the Mexican government until 1824. In the 1830s and 1840s, the land housed a plantation owned by John Darrington of Alabama. Slaves picked cotton and sugar cane there. Darrington did not live on the site, but the name Darrington Plantation stuck even after subsequent owners bought the land. The state of Texas kept the name of the plantation when they opened the prison, designating it the Darrington Unit.

The song "Wasn't That a Mighty Storm" was first recorded by John A. Lomax in 1934 at Darrington, sung by "Sin-Killer" Griffin who claimed authorship. In 1935 Darrington housed African American prisoners.

In 1963, before racial desegregation occurred, the facility housed white second offenders. In the late 1980s, Darrington housed a lot of leaders of prison gangs. In 1986 and 1987 a 12-foot (3.7 m) high gunwalk was built, overseeing 13 recreation yards; the walk allows prison guards to easily shoot and kill raging prisoners.

In 2017 a judge ordered the installation of air conditioning.

In January 2021, State Representative James White, chair of the Texas House Committee on Corrections, asked the Texas Board of Criminal Justice to rename the Darrington Unit and two other Texas prisons because the names were associated with slavery or convict leasing. White referred to John Darrington as a "plantation mega owner". Later in the year, TDCJ changed the name of the prison to the Memorial Unit in honor of the agency's deceased employees.

== Operations ==
The Texas Legislature designated portions of Angleton ISD that by September 1, 1995 had not been annexed by Alvin Community College as in the Brazosport College zone. As Darrington Unit is not in the maps of Alvin CC, it is in the Brazosport College zone. There was a section of H.B. No. 2744, filed on March 6, 2007, which would have changed the boundary between Alvin CC and Brazosport CC to put the Darrington Unit in the Alvin CC service boundary.

== Prisoner life ==
=== Education ===
In 2011, a campus of the Southwestern Baptist Theological Seminary was established in the prison. The school has significantly reduced the rate of violence in the prison.

== Notable prisoners ==
Inmate Name	Register Number	Status	Details
Timothy Wayne Shepherd	06215102 / 01530683	Serving a sentence of 99 years, of which he would 126 years old when released, effectively making it a life sentence. However, he is eligible for parole in 2037.	Perpetrator of the 2007 Murder of Tynesha Stewart, his ex-girlfriend, which is notable for the unusual method of disposing her body in which Shepard cooked her on a barbeque grill to cover up his crime.

- David Graham, perpetrator of the murder of Adrianne Jones
- Dennis Hope, whose breakout is dramatized in Season 1, Episode 3 of the National Geographic TV docudrama series, Breakout.
