= Clements Unit =

Prison in Potter County, Texas, United States

William P. Clements Unit
- Location in Texas
- Location: 9601 Spur 591 Amarillo, Texas 79107-9606; 35°14′29″N 101°43′49″W
- Status: Operational
- Security class: G1-G5, Administrative Segregation, Mental Health (PAMIO)
- Capacity: 3,798
- Opened: March 1990
- Managed by: TDCJ Correctional Institutions Division
- Warden: Adam Gonzales
- Website: www.tdcj.state.tx.us/unit_directory../bc.html

The William P. "Bill" Clements Unit (BC) is a state prison of the Texas Department of Criminal Justice (TDCJ) located in unincorporated Potter County, Texas, United States, east of Downtown Amarillo. It is located on Spur 591 off of Loop 335.

As of 2016 it had 3,700 inmates.

== History ==
The prison opened in March 1990. It was named after Governor of Texas William P. Clements.

In June 2013, according to a report surveying 92,449 adult inmates in 606 prisons, jails, and special confinement facilities from February 2011 to May 2012 by the U.S. Bureau of Justice Statistics, of the prisons holding men the Clements Unit had the eighth-highest rate of inmates who reported that inmates stated that they had, during the past year, experienced sexual victimization from another inmate; the percentage was 6.8%. The percentage had decreased from its percentage in 2008. In 2008 the Bureau of Justice Statistics ranked Clements as the second highest in its category. For 2011–2012, 8.1% of inmates at Clements reported sexual intercourse or sexual contact with staff members, making it the fifth-highest in its category. In 2008 it was the second-highest in that category with 9.5%. Jason Clark, a TDCJ spokesperson, said that many of the accusations "could reflect offender attitudes toward other offensive behavior or legitimate security precautions" and that many were not actually sexual assault. The study also said that the Clements Unit had the worst rate of employee-on-inmate sexual assault of any facility in the country. The state of Texas counts all allegations towards this total even if proven false. Several offenders are under constant video surveillance due to constant false accusations.

In 2011, a male prison nurse had an inmate do sexual favors for him. Domenic Hidalgo, the prison nurse, pleaded guilty in 2013 and received a four-year probation term.

Inmate Alton Rodgers died on January 19, 2016, after being found unresponsive in his cell. His cellmate was accused of murdering him. By February 2016, officials of the TDCJ recommended dismissing a supervisor and giving disciplinary action to 17 other employees.

== Notable inmates ==
Inmate Name	Register Number	Status	Details
David Dowler	03909662 / 00472904	Serving a life sentence.	Murdered 3 people in the 1980s.
Jose Sifuentes	07105040 / 02353019	Serving a life sentence.	After several years of being a fugitive, was convicted of 3 murders.

- Travis Trevino Runnels - was serving a 70-year sentence for aggravated robbery. Runnels fatally stabbed a forty year old correctional officer, who was working as an Industrial Supervisor in the unit boot factory. He was sentenced to death and subsequently moved to Polunsky Unit. Executed in 2019.
- Samuel Scott Jones - sentenced to life in prison in 2009 for a July 2006 18-Wheeler theft, where he held a female driver hostage at gunpoint for four hours while being chased by police through multiple counties. The incident gained notoriety from numerous News media outlets covering the incident. The negotiation between Dallas Police Department SWAT Team members was filmed as part of the A&E television show Dallas SWAT.
