= Nitty Gritty Dirt Band discography =

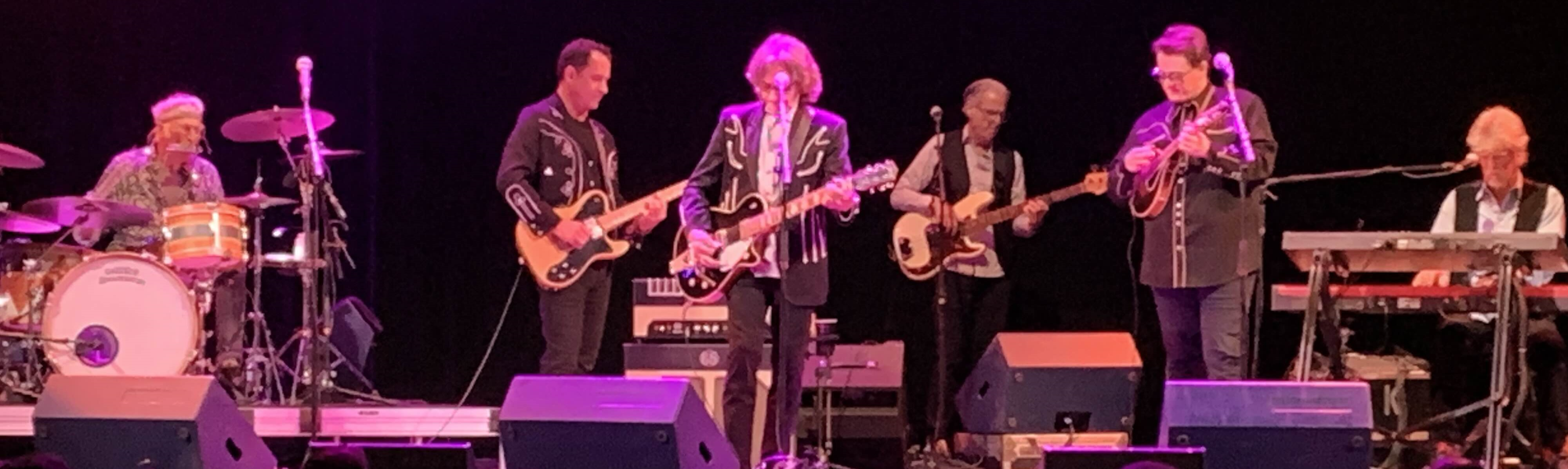
- Nitty Gritty Dirt Band in 2024.
- Studio albums: 25
- Live albums: 1
- Compilation albums: 4
- Singles: 41
- Music videos: 22
- No. 1 singles: 4

Nitty Gritty Dirt Band (NGDB) is an American country rock band. The group has existed in various forms since its founding in Long Beach, California, in 1966. The band's membership has had at least a dozen changes over the years, including a period when the band performed and recorded as the Dirt Band. The band is often cited as instrumental to the progression of contemporary country and roots music.

The band's successes include a cover version of Jerry Jeff Walker's "Mr. Bojangles". Albums include 1972's Will the Circle Be Unbroken, featuring such traditional country artists as Mother Maybelle Carter, Earl Scruggs, Roy Acuff, Doc Watson, Merle Travis, and Jimmy Martin. A follow-up album based on the same concept, Will the Circle Be Unbroken: Volume Two was released in 1989, was certified gold, won two Grammys, and was named Album of the Year at the Country Music Association Awards.

== Studio albums ==
=== 1960s ===
Title	Details	Peak positions
Title	Details	US
The Nitty Gritty Dirt Band	Release date: March 1967; Label: Liberty Records	151
Ricochet	Release date: September 1967; Label: Liberty Records	—
Rare Junk	Release date: February 1968; Label: Liberty Records	—
"—" denotes releases that did not chart

=== 1970s ===
Title	Details	Peak chart positions			
Title	Details	US Country	US	AUS	CAN
Uncle Charlie & His Dog Teddy	Release date: September 1970; Label: Liberty Records	—	66	31	56
All the Good Times	Release date: January 1972; Label: United Artists Records	—	162	47	—
Stars & Stripes Forever	Release date: June 1974; Label: United Artists Records	32	28	93	25
Symphonion Dream	Release date: August 1975; Label: United Artists Records	—	66	—	—
The Dirt Band	Release date: June 1978; Label: United Artists Records	—	163	—	—
An American Dream	Release date: July 1979; Label: United Artists Records	—	76	82	63
"—" denotes releases that did not chart

=== 1980s ===
Title	Details	Peak chart positions			
Title	Details	US Country	US	CAN Country	CAN
Make a Little Magic	Release date: June 1980; Label: United Artists Records	—	62	12	64
Jealousy	Release date: July 1981; Label: Liberty Records	—	102	—	—
Let's Go	Release date: June 1983; Label: Liberty Records	26	—	—	—
Plain Dirt Fashion	Release date: June 1984; Label: Warner Bros. Records	8	—	5	—
Partners, Brothers and Friends	Release date: July 1985; Label: Warner Bros. Records	9	—	—	—
Hold On	Release date: July 1987; Label: Warner Bros. Records	14	—	—	—
Workin' Band	Release date: August 1988; Label: Warner Bros. Records	33	—	—	—
"—" denotes releases that did not chart

=== 1990s onward ===
Title	Details	Peak positions
Title	Details	US Country
The Rest of the Dream	Release date: June 26, 1990; Label: MCA Records	53
Not Fade Away	Release date: 1992; Label: Liberty Records	—
Acoustic	Release date: May 31, 1994; Label: Liberty Records	—
The Christmas Album	Release date: October 21, 1997; Label: Rising Tide Records	—
Bang, Bang, Bang	Release date: May 5, 1999; Label: DreamWorks Records	—
Welcome to Woody Creek	Release date: September 21, 2004; Label: Dualtone Records	—
Speed of Life	Release date: September 22, 2009; Label: NGDB Records	59
Dirt Does Dylan	Release date: March 8, 2022; Label: NGDB Records	—
"Night After Night"	Release Date : October 24, 2025; Label: Vector	
"—" denotes releases that did not chart

== Collaborations ==
Title	Details	Peak chart positions				Certifications (sales thresholds)
Title	Details	US Country	US	CAN Country	CAN	Certifications (sales thresholds)
Will the Circle Be Unbroken	Release date: October 1972; Label: United Artists Records	4	68	—	21	US: Platinum
Will the Circle Be Unbroken: Volume Two	Release date: May 1, 1989; Label: Universal Records	5	95	3	57	CAN: Gold
Will the Circle Be Unbroken, Volume III	Release date: February 1, 2002; Label: Capitol Nashville	18	134	—	—	
"—" denotes releases that did not chart

== Live albums ==
Title	Details	Peak positions		
Title	Details	US Country	US Folk	US Bluegrass
Alive	Release date: March 1969; Label: Liberty Records	—	—	—
Live Two Five	Release date: July 16, 1991; Label: Capitol Nashville	50	—	—
Circlin’ Back: Celebrating 50 Years (CD/DVD)	Release date: September 30, 2016; Label: Warner Nashville	11	11	1
"—" denotes releases that did not chart

== Compilation albums ==
Title	Details	Peak chart positions		Certifications (sales thresholds)
Title	Details	US Country	US	Certifications (sales thresholds)
Dirt, Silver and Gold	Release date: October 1976; Label: United Artists Records	28	77	
Twenty Years of Dirt	Release date: May 1986; Label: Warner Bros. Records	10	—	US: Platinum
The Best Of	Release date: September 1987; Label: EMI America Records	—	—	
More Great Dirt	Release date: January 10, 1989; Label: Warner Bros. Records	38	—	US: Gold
Greatest Hits	Release date: October 1990; Label: Curb Records	—	—	
"—" denotes releases that did not chart

== Singles ==
=== 1960s and 1970s ===
Year	Single	Peak chart positions				Album
Year	Single	US Country	US	AUS	CAN	Album
1967	"Buy for Me the Rain"	—	45	—	37	The Nitty Gritty Dirt Band
1967	"Truly Right"	—	—	—	—	Ricochet
1968	"Collegiana"	—	—	—	—	Rare Junk
1969	"Some of Shelly's Blues"	—	—	—	—	Uncle Charlie & His Dog Teddy
1970	"Mr. Bojangles"	—	9	15	2	Uncle Charlie & His Dog Teddy
1970	"Rave On"	—	—	—	—	Uncle Charlie & His Dog Teddy
1971	"House at Pooh Corner"	—	53	—	30	Uncle Charlie & His Dog Teddy
1971	"Some of Shelly's Blues" ^{[A]}	—	64	—	56	Uncle Charlie & His Dog Teddy
1971	"I Saw the Light" (with Roy Acuff)	56	—	—	—	Will the Circle Be Unbroken
1972	"Jambalaya (On the Bayou)"	—	84	—	—	All the Good Times
1972	"Baltimore"	—	—	—	—	All the Good Times
1972	"Jamaica (Say You Will)"	—	—	—	—	All the Good Times
1972	"Honky Tonkin'"	—	—	—	—	Will the Circle Be Unbroken
1973	"Cosmic Cowboy – Part 1"	—	123	—	—	Stars & Stripes Forever
1973	"Grand Ole Opry Song" (with Jimmy Martin)	97	—	—	—	Will the Circle Be Unbroken
1973	"Tennessee Stud" (with Doc Watson)	—	—	—	—	Will the Circle Be Unbroken
1974	"The Battle of New Orleans"	—	72	—	—	Stars & Stripes Forever
1975	"(All I Have to Do Is) Dream"	—	66	—	—	Symphonium Dream
1975	"Mother of Love"	—	—	—	—	Symphonium Dream
1976	"Cosmic Cowboy" (re-recording) (as The Dirt Band)	—	—	—	—	Dirt, Silver and Gold
1976	"Jamaica Lady" (as The Dirt Band)	—	—	—	—	Dirt, Silver and Gold
1976	"Mother Earth (Provides For Me)" (as The Dirt Band)	—	—	—	—	Dirt, Silver and Gold
1978	"In for the Night" (as The Dirt Band)	—	86	—	—	The Dirt Band
1978	"For A Little While" (as The Dirt Band)	—	—	—	—	The Dirt Band
1979	"In Her Eyes" (as The Dirt Band)	—	—	—	—	An American Dream
"—" denotes releases that did not chart

=== 1980s ===
Year	Single	Peak chart positions					Certifications (sales thresholds)	Album
Year	Single	US Country	US	AUS	CAN Country	CAN	Certifications (sales thresholds)	Album
1980	"An American Dream" (as The Dirt Band)	58	13	45	—	3		An American Dream
1980	"Make a Little Magic" (as The Dirt Band)^{[B]}	77	25	—	—	52		Make a Little Magic
1980	"Badlands" (as The Dirt Band)	—	107	—	—	—		Make a Little Magic
1980	"High School Yearbook" (as The Dirt Band)	—	—	—	—	—		Make a Little Magic
1981	"Fire in the Sky" (as The Dirt Band)	—	76	—	—	—		Jealousy
1981	"Jealousy" (as The Dirt Band)	—	—	—	—	—		Jealousy
1981	"Too Close For Comfort" (as The Dirt Band)	—	—	—	—	—		Jealousy
1983	"Shot Full of Love"	19	—	—	—	—		Let's Go
1983	"Dance Little Jean"	9	—	—	39	—		Let's Go
1984	"Long Hard Road (The Sharecropper's Dream)"	1	—	—	2	—		Plain Dirt Fashion
1984	"I Love Only You"	3	—	—	3	—		Plain Dirt Fashion
1985	"High Horse"	2	—	—	2	—		Plain Dirt Fashion
1985	"Modern Day Romance"	1	—	—	2	—		Partners, Brothers and Friends
1985	"Home Again in My Heart"	3	—	—	1	—		Partners, Brothers and Friends
1986	"Partners, Brothers and Friends"	6	—	—	3	—		Partners, Brothers and Friends
1986	"Stand a Little Rain"	5	—	—	3	—		Twenty Years of Dirt
1986	"Fire in the Sky" (re-release)^{[C]}	7	—	—	5	—		Twenty Years of Dirt
1987	"Baby's Got a Hold on Me"	2	—	—	2	—		Hold On
1987	"Fishin' in the Dark"	1	—	—	1	—	US: Platinum; NZ: Gold	Hold On
1987	"Oh What a Love"	5	—	—	—	—		Hold On
1988	"Workin' Man (Nowhere to Go)"	4	—	—	6	—		Workin' Band
1988	"I've Been Lookin'"	2	—	—	1	—		Workin' Band
1988	"Down That Road Tonight"	6	—	—	—	—		Workin' Band
1989	"Turn of the Century"	27	—	—	24	—		Will the Circle Be Unbroken: Volume Two
1989	"And So It Goes" (with John Denver)	14	—	—	29	—		Will the Circle Be Unbroken: Volume Two
1989	"When It's Gone"	10	—	—	11	—		Will the Circle Be Unbroken: Volume Two
"—" denotes releases that did not chart

=== 1990s onward ===
Year	Single	Peak chart positions		Album
Year	Single	US Country	CAN Country	Album
1990	"One Step Over the Line" (with Rosanne Cash and John Hiatt)	63	47	Will the Circle Be Unbroken: Volume Two
1990	"From Small Things (Big Things One Day Come)"	65	66	The Rest of the Dream
1990	"You Made Life Good Again"	60	33	The Rest of the Dream
1990	"The Rest of the Dream"	—	—	The Rest of the Dream
1991	"Cadillac Ranch"	—	—	Live Two Five
1991	"Mr. Bojangles" (re-recording)	—	68	Live Two Five
1992	"I Fought the Law"	66	—	Not Fade Away
1992	"One Good Love"	74	85	Not Fade Away
1993	"Little Angel"	—	—	Not Fade Away
1994	"Cupid's Got a Gun"	—	—	Acoustic
1996	"Maybe Baby"	—	—	Not Fade Away (Remembering Buddy Holly)
1998	"Bang, Bang, Bang"^{[D]}	52	44	Bang, Bang, Bang
1999	"Bang, Bang, Bang" (re-release)	63	67	Bang, Bang, Bang
2021	"The Times They Are a-Changin'" (with Rosanne Cash, Steve Earle, Jason Isbell, and The War and Treaty	—	—	Dirt Does Dylan
"—" denotes releases that did not chart

== Other singles ==
=== Christmas singles ===
Year	Single	Peak positions	Album
Year	Single	US Country	Album
1983	"Colorado Christmas"	93	A Christmas Tradition
1988	"Colorado Christmas" (re-release)	—	Sessions Presents: Christmas Wishes

== Notes ==
- A "Some of Shelly's Blues" did not chart when first issued on Liberty. United Artists reissued the title in 1971, at which time it charted.
- B "Make a Little Magic" also peaked at number 26 on the Canadian RPM Adult Contemporary Tracks chart.
- C The recording of "Fire In The Sky" that charted in 1986 and appeared on the Twenty Years of Dirt album is the same recording that had previously been issued on the Liberty label in 1981. Both the reissued single and aforementioned album ascribe phonographic copyright to Liberty Records.
- D "Bang, Bang, Bang" was originally released by Rising Tide Records before that label closed; the re-release of the song in 1999 was under DreamWorks Records.

== Music videos ==
Year	Title	Director
1981	"Fire in the Sky"	
1985	"Modern Day Romance"	Gary Amelon
1986	"Partners, Brothers and Friends"	Gary Gutierrez
1988	"I've Been Lookin'"	
1989	"Will the Circle Be Unbroken"	Bill Pope
1989	"When It's Gone"	Joanne Gardner
1990	"You Made Life Good Again"	Joanne Gardner
1990	"The Rest of the Dream"	Joanne Gardner
1991	"Mr. Bojangles" (live)	Gerry Wenner
1991	"Cadillac Ranch" (live)	
1992	"One Good Love"	
1993	"Little Angel"	
1994	"Cupid's Got a Gun"	Roger Pistole
1996	"You Believed in Me" (with Karla Bonoff)	
1996	"Maybe Baby"	
1997	"Silent Night"	
1998	"Bang, Bang, Bang"	Michael McNamara
2002	"The Lowlands"	Wes Edwards
2022	"I Shall Be Released" (featuring Larkin Poe)	
2022	"Forever Young"	
2022	"Country Pie"	

== DVD & VHS ==
Year	Title
1982	"The Dirt Band Tonight"
1991	"Twenty Years of Dirt"
1993	"Northern Circle The Nitty Gritty Dirt Band Plays Alaska"
2003	Will The Circle Be Unbroken: Farther Along
2007	"Country Legends Live Mini Concert"
2016	"Circlin’ Back: Celebrating 50 Years" (CD/DVD)

== NGDB as contributing artists ==
Year	Album title by Artist	Contribution
1969	Paint Your Wagon soundtrack, by various artists	"Hand Me Down That Can O' Beans"
1975	Banjoman soundtrack, by various artists	Live version of "Battle Of New Orleans" and "Diggy Liggy Lo"
1978	Wild And Crazy Guy, by Steve Martin	"King Tut", as the Toot Uncommons
1986	Tribute to Steve Goodman, by various artists	"Face On The Cutting Room Floor", live
2003	Tennessee Stud, by Doc Watson	"Tennessee Stud"
2004	This Is Americana, by various artists	"Gold Watch & Chain", with Kris Kristofferson
2004	The Unbroken Circle - The Musical Heritage Of The Carter Family, by various artists	"Gold Watch & Chain", with Kris Kristofferson
2004	Merlefest Live! The Best of 2003, by various artists	"American Dream"
2005	Telluride Bluegrass Festival: 30 Years, by various artists	"Fishin' In The Dark", live
