= John McEuen =

American singer-songwriter (born 1945)

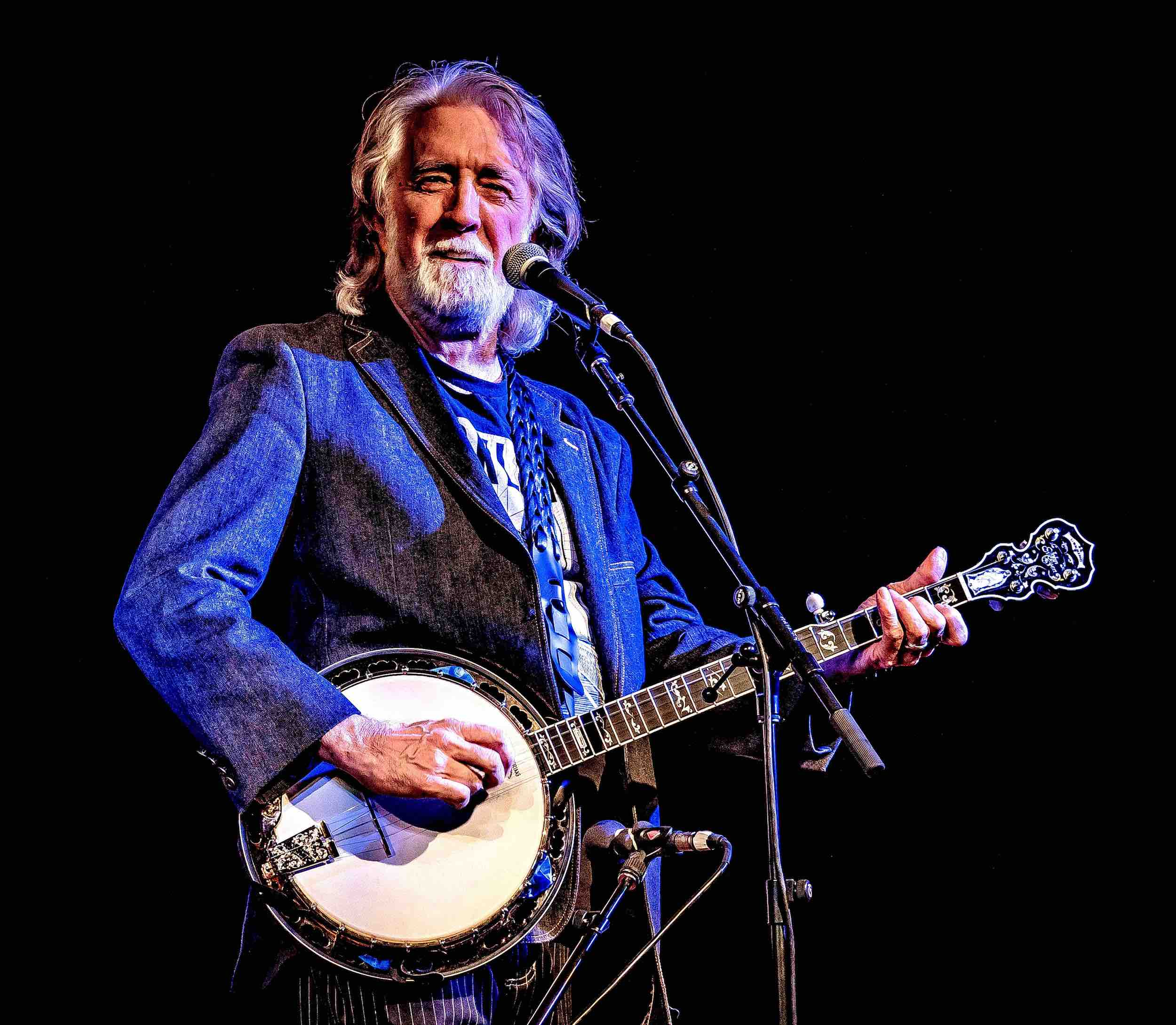
- John McEuen playing the banjo in 2019

Background information
- Born: December 19, 1945 (age 80); Oakland, California, U.S.
- Genres: Country; folk; folk-rock; bluegrass
- Occupations: Musician; singer; producer
- Instruments: Banjo; guitar; mandolin; fiddle; piano; accordion; vocals
- Years active: 1965–present
- Labels: Warner Bros.; Vanguard; Cedar Glen; Planetary; Aix; Rural Rhythm
- Formerly of: Nitty Gritty Dirt Band
- Website: www.johnmceuen.com

John McEuen (born December 19, 1945) is an American folk musician and a founding member of the Nitty Gritty Dirt Band.

== Career ==
=== Solo work ===
John McEuen was born in Oakland, California. In 1964, at age 18, he became interested in music after seeing a performance by the Dillards, and learned to play the banjo. Eventually, he took an interest in fiddle and mandolin. In 1986, after twenty years with the Dirt Band, McEuen departed to pursue a solo career. From 1991–1997, he released four albums for Vanguard Records. He composed music for movies and television and he appeared as a guest on albums with several artists including five albums with Michael Martin Murphey. He then returned to the Dirt Band in 2001. McEuen departed the band once again in late 2017.

=== Steve Martin ===
McEuen has known Steve Martin since high school, when he would give Martin occasional lessons on the banjo. In 1978, he was asked by Martin to provide the backing band for a comic, novelty song called King Tut. With Martin on vocals, the Dirt Band recorded the song under the alias "The Toot Uncommons".

McEuen produced and played on Martin's album The Crow: New Songs for the 5-String Banjo (Rounder, 2009). The album was Number 1 for seven months and won the Grammy Award for Best Bluegrass Album.

=== Other ventures ===
McEuen published an autobiography in 2018 titled The Life I've Picked - A Banjo Player's Nitty Gritty Journey.

== Awards and honors ==
- The American Banjo Museum Hall of Fame Inductee
- Independent Music Award for Best Americana Album, "Made in Brooklyn"

== Discography ==
- John McEuen (Warner Bros. Records, 1985)
- String Wizards (Vanguard, 1991)
- String Wizards II (Vanguard, 1993)
- Acoustic Traveller (Vanguard, 1996)
- Vanguard Visionaries (Vanguard 73164-2, 2007)
- At The Warehouse - Cowboys In The Sky (FestivaLink FEST0092, 2007)
- Roots Music Made In Brooklyn (Chesky Records, 2016)

With Jimmy Ibbotson

- Stories & Songs (Planetary Records PLAN9023) (Out O' The Blue Radio Revue) (2000)
- At The Warehouse - Cowboys In The Sky (FestivaLink FEST0092, 2007)

With Jimmy Ibbotson and Jennifer Warnes

- Nitty Gritty Surround (Aix Records AIX80008, 2001) (on DVD)

With The Nitty Gritty Dirt Band

- The Nitty Gritty Dirt Band (Liberty, 1967)
- Ricochet (Liberty, 1967)
- Rare Junk (Liberty, 1968)
- Uncle Charlie & His Dog Teddy (Liberty, 1970)
- All the Good Times (United Artists, 1972)
- Will the Circle Be Unbroken (United Artists UAS9801, 1972)
- Stars & Stripes Forever (United Artists, 1974)
- Symphonion Dream (United Artists, 1975)
- The Dirt Band (United Artists, 1978)
- An American Dream (United Artists, 1979)
- Make A Little Magic (United Artists, 1980)
- Jealousy (Liberty, 1981)
- Let's Go (Liberty, 1983)
- Plain Dirt Fashion (Warner Bros., 1984)
- Partners, Brothers and Friends (Warner Bros., 1985)
- Hold On (Warner Bros., 1987)
- Workin' Band (Warner Bros., 1988)
- Will the Circle Be Unbroken: Volume Two (Universal, 1989)
- The Rest of the Dream (MCA, 1990)
- Not Fade Away (Liberty, 1992)
- Acoustic (Liberty, 1994)
- The Christmas Album (Rising Tide, 1997)
- Bang, Bang, Bang (DreamWorks, 1999)
- Will the Circle Be Unbroken, Volume III (Capitol, 2002)
- Welcome to Woody Creek (Dualtone, 2004)
- Speed of Life (Sugar Hill, 2009)

With The L.A. String Wizards

- Round Trip: Live in L.A. (Rural Rhythm, 2005)

With The McEuen Sessions

- For All The Good (Mesa 2260, 2012)
