= Acoustic Traveller =

Studio album by John McEuen
- Released: 1996
- Genres: Country rock, bluegrass
- Length: 55:36
- Label: Vanguard
- Producers: Dom Camerdella, John McEuen

John McEuen chronology
Live Two Five (1990)	Acoustic Traveller (1996)	The Christmas Album (1997)

Acoustic Traveller is the 1996 album from John McEuen. John is notable for being a longtime member of the Nitty Gritty Dirt Band for which he was a multi-instrument and composer/arranger. He played on many of their charting albums and singles. He also records as a solo artist, and has appeared as a guest musician on many albums by many artists.

== Reception ==
Professional ratings
Review scores
Source	Rating
AllMusic	4.5/5 stars

The AllMusic review by William Ruhlmann awarded the album 4.5 stars stating "John McEuen plays a variety of stringed instruments, including mandolin, guitar, banjo, dulcimer, lap steel guitar, and even a Japanese koto on this accomplished album of folk, country, bluegrass, and Western-flavored traditional-sounding original instrumentals, with one vocal track, "I Am a Pilgrim." There are many familiar sounds from McEuen's long career on Acoustic Traveller, including "Mr. Bojangles (Suite).".

== Track listing ==
All tracks by John McEuen except where noted.

1. "Gypsy Knights" – 5:45
2. "Fisher's" – 1:56
3. "Keep Walking" – 3:56
4. "Turki Innastra" – 2:17
5. "Acoustic Traveller" – 3:32
6. "Moonlight Dancing" – 4:00
7. "Lady's Choice" – 2:56
8. "Old Country" – 4:23
9. "Homecoming" (Dom Camardella, McEuen) – 4:24
10. "Go Lightly in the Night" – 4:01
11. "Back N 4th in Pahrump, Nevada" – 2:53
12. "After Dark" – 2:54
13. "I Am a Pilgrim" (Merle Travis) – 3:29
14. "Mr. Bojangles (Suite)" (Jerry Jeff Walker) – 4:58
15. "Gypsy Knights (Reprise)" – 4:12

== Personnel ==
Nashville Sessions 5, 7, 8 & 12

- David Hoffner – hammered dulcimer, synth, rhodes piano
- John Vogt – bass
- Jonathan McEuen – electric guitar
- David Coe – fiddle
- Kenny Malone – percussion
- John McEuen – guitar, banjo, mandolin, koto

Santa Barbara Sessions 1–4, 6, 9–11, 13-15

- Randy Tico – bass, serdo drum
- Phil Salazar – fiddle
- Mike Mullen – mandolin
- Jonathan McEuen – electric guitar, acoustic rhythm
- Lorenzo Martinez – percussion
- Dom Camardella – piano, synth
- Billy Puett – recorders, flute
- John McEuen – acoustic guitar, mandolin, lap guitar, banjo, dulcimer, vocals
- Jeff Valdez – harmonica

== See also ==
- Nitty Gritty Dirt Band discography
