= An American Dream (song) =

Single by The Dirt Band

from the album An American Dream
- B-side: "Take Me Back"
- Released: November 19, 1979
- Genre: Country
- Length: 3:28 (Single Version); 3:53 (Album Version)
- Label: United Artists
- Songwriter: Rodney Crowell
- Producers: Jeff Hanna, Bob Edwards

The Dirt Band singles chronology
"In for the Night" (1978)	"An American Dream" (1979)	"Make a Little Magic" (1980)

"An American Dream" is a song written by Rodney Crowell. He recorded it under the title "Voilá, An American Dream" on his 1978 album Ain't Living Long Like This, and released it as the B-side to that album's single "(Now and Then There's) A Fool Such as I".

== The Dirt Band recording ==
It was later recorded by American country-rock music group the Nitty Gritty Dirt Band, but using the shortened name "The Dirt Band." It was released in November 1979 as the only single and title track from the album An American Dream. The song reached number 58 on the Billboard Hot Country Singles & Tracks chart, number 13 on the U.S. Billboard Hot 100, and number 16 on the Adult Contemporary chart. In Canada, it reached number three. The Nitty Gritty Dirt Band's version features a backing vocal from Linda Ronstadt; as such, it is sometimes included in Ronstadt greatest hits collections, such as the 2014 Capitol release, Icon.

The labels on some of the 45 rpm records were reversed, so that "An American Dream" was labeled "Take Me Back" and vice versa.

== Track listing ==
7" single - North America (1979)

1. "An American Dream" - 3:50
2. "Take Me Back" - 3:01

== Chart performance ==
=== Weekly charts ===
Chart (1979–1980)	Peak position
Australian (Kent Music Report)	45
Austria (Ö3 Austria Top 40)	12
Canada (RPM) Top Singles	3
Netherlands (Dutch Top 40)	3
New Zealand (Recorded Music NZ)	39
South African Top 20	6
U.S. Billboard Hot 100	13
U.S. Billboard Adult Contemporary	16
U.S. Billboard Hot Country Singles & Tracks	58

=== Year-end charts ===
Chart (1980)	Rank
Canada	26
US Top Pop Singles (Billboard)	72

== Other cover versions ==
- The song was adapted into Norwegian as "Ein nordmann sin draum" (A norwegian man's dream) by Olav Stedje.
- In the Philippines, the song was adapted by Fred Panopio as "Turistang Bilmoko."
