= An American Dream (album) =

Studio album by Nitty Gritty Dirt Band
- Released: 1979
- Genre: Soft rock, pop
- Label: United Artists
- Producer: Jeff Hanna, Bob Edwards

Nitty Gritty Dirt Band chronology
The Dirt Band (1978)	An American Dream (1979)	Make a Little Magic (1980)

Professional ratings
Review scores
Source	Rating
AllMusic	3/5 stars

An American Dream is an album by the Nitty Gritty Dirt Band, released in 1979. The title track was written by Rodney Crowell. The band supported the album with a North American tour.

== Track listing ==
1. "An American Dream" (Crowell) – 3:53
2. "In Her Eyes" (Roberts) – 4:16
3. "Take Me Back" (Hanna, Fadden, Hathaway) – 3:03
4. "Jas'moon" (Hanna, Hathaway, Bregante, Garth, Carpenter) – 3:27
5. "Dance the Night Away" (Carpenter, Holster) – 4:21
6. "New Orleans" (Guido, Royster) – 3:59
7. "Happy Feet" (Bregante, Garth) – 3:59
8. "Do You Feel the Way I Do" (Hanna, Fadden) – 3:58
9. "What's On Your Mind" (Hanna, Hathaway, Bregante) – 3:44
10. "Wolverton Mountain'" (Kilgore, King) – 3:16

== Charts ==
Chart (1980)	Peak position
Australian (Kent Music Report)	82

== Personnel ==
The Dirt Band

- Jeff Hanna — guitars; lead vocals (tracks 1–3, 5, 6, 9, 10), backing vocals (track 3, 6–8), guitar solo (track 6)
- Jimmie Fadden — guitars, harmonica; backing vocals (track 2), lead vocals (track 8)
- Al Garth — violin, saxophone, keyboards, horn arrangements and solos; backing vocals (tracks 2, 3), lead vocals (track 7)
- John McEuen — guitars, banjo, mandolin, Dobro, lap steel guitar
- Bob Carpenter — keyboards; backing vocals (tracks 6–8)
- Richard Hathaway — bass; backing vocals (tracks 2, 3)
- Mel Bregante — drums, percussion; backing vocals (tracks 2, 3)

Additional musicians

- Linda Ronstadt — harmony vocals (track 1), backing vocals (track 6)
- Leah Kunkel — backing vocals (tracks 5, 9)
- Marty Gwinn — backing vocals (tracks 5, 9)
- Funky Lester — bari
- Al Kooper — keyboards
- Bobby Lakind — percussion
- Le Roux:
  - Jeff Pollard — guitars; backing vocals (track 2), guitar solo (track 6)
  - Tony Haselden — guitars; guitar solo (track 1)
  - Bobby Campo — trumpet, cornet, percussion
  - Rod Roddy — keyboards; backing vocals (track 2)
  - Leon Medica — bass
  - David Peters — drums

Production

- Producer – Jeff Hanna and Bob Edwards

== See also ==
Nitty Gritty Dirt Band discography
