= Alive (Nitty Gritty Dirt Band album) =

Live album by Nitty Gritty Dirt Band
- Released: 1969
- Genre: Country, country rock, folk rock, bluegrass
- Length: 37:45
- Label: Liberty
- Producer: Dallas Smith

Nitty Gritty Dirt Band chronology
Rare Junk (1968)	Alive (1969)	Uncle Charlie & His Dog Teddy (1970)

Alive is the 1969 album by the Nitty Gritty Dirt Band. Liberty Records released this album after the original version of the band broke up and before the next version of the band re-signed with them. John McEuen would later recall that "we did [the album] at the Troubador and there were mountains of equipment on stage because Poco were on the same bill with us." Given McEuen's comment, the documented performance most likely occurred on either December 6 or 7, 1968. The band would break up within weeks of this show.

== Reception ==
Professional ratings
Review scores
Source	Rating
AllMusic	4/5 stars

The AllMusic review by Bruce Eder stated, "How many live albums -- forget decent ones -- were left behind by bands in 1967/68? This is one, and it's better than decent, and almost a gift from heaven, capturing an early incarnation of the group (circa 1967) on a good night at the L.A. Troubadour. Someone has earned a place in musical heaven for seeing to recording the show.".

== Track listing ==
1. "Crazy Words, Crazy Tune" (Jack Yellen, Milton Ager) – 1:39
2. "Buy for Me the Rain" (Steve Noonan, Greg Copeland) – 3:12
3. "Candy Man" (Rev. Gary Davis) – 2:36
4. "Foggy Mountain Breakdown" (Earl Scruggs) – 5:04
5. "Rock Me Baby" (B.B. King, Jules Taub) – 5:51
6. "Fat Boys (Can Make It in Santa Monica)" (Jeff Hanna, Chris Darrow) – 1:41
7. "Alligator Man" (Floyd Chance, Jimmy C. Newman) – 3:43
8. "Crazy Words, Crazy Tune" (Jack Yellen, Milton Ager) – 3:48
9. "Goodnight, My Love, Pleasant Dreams" (George Motola, John Marascalco) – 10:11

== Personnel ==
- Ralph Barr – guitar, kazoo, lead vocals on "Crazy Words, Crazy Tune"
- John McEuen – banjo, piano, accordion, tambourine
- Jeff Hanna – rhythm guitar, washboard, harmonica, drums, lead vocals
- Jimmie Fadden – drums, harmonica, washtub bass, jug, lead vocals on "Rock Me Baby"
- Les Thompson – bass
- Chris Darrow – fiddle, mandolin, lead vocals on "Alligator Man" and "Goodnight, My Love, Pleasant Dreams"
