= Live Two Five =

Live album by Nitty Gritty Dirt Band
- Released: 1991
- Genre: Country, country rock, folk rock, bluegrass
- Label: Capitol Nashville
- Producer: T-Bone Burnett

Nitty Gritty Dirt Band chronology
The Rest of the Dream (1990)	Live Two Five (1991)	Not Fade Away (1992)

Professional ratings
Review scores
Source	Rating
Allmusic	3/5 stars

Live Two Five is a 1991 live album by American band Nitty Gritty Dirt Band. It was recorded during three shows at the Red Deer Fine Arts Center in Alberta, Canada, in 1991. The concert recording marks the twenty-fifth anniversary of The Nitty Gritty Dirt Band despite the absence of founding member John McEuen. The tracks on this collection are live versions of songs that were previously released as well as a new song.

== Track listing ==
1. "High Horse" (Jimmy Ibbotson) – 2:53
2. "I've Been Lookin'" (Ibbotson, Jeff Hanna) – 3:12
3. "Make a Little Magic" (Hanna, Richard Hathaway, Bob Carpenter) – 3:12
4. "You Ain't Goin' Nowhere" (Bob Dylan) – 3:11
5. "Long Hard Road (The Sharecropper's Dream)" (Rodney Crowell) – 3:44
6. "Stand a Little Rain" (Don Schlitz, Donny Lowery) – 4:38
7. "Dance Little Jean" (Ibbotson) – 3:35
8. "Mr. Bojangles" (Jerry Jeff Walker) – 4:12
9. "Workin' Man (Nowhere to Go)" (Fadden) – 3:42
10. "Ripplin' Waters" (Ibbotson) – 10:46
11. "El Harpo" (Fadden, Carpenter) – 5:41
12. "Fishin' in the Dark" (Wendy Waldman, Jim Photoglo) – 3:17
13. "Baby's Got a Hold on Me" (Josh Leo, Hanna, Ibbotson) – 2:58
14. "Face on the Cutting Room Floor" (Steve Goodman, Hanna, Ibbotson) – 3:06
15. "Partners, Brothers and Friends" (Ibbotson, Hanna) – 3:46
16. "Cadillac Ranch" (Bruce Springsteen) – 4:09

== Personnel ==
- Jeff Hanna – vocals, electric, acoustic and slide guitar
- Jimmy Ibbotson – vocals, acoustic guitar, mandolin, electric bass
- Jimmie Fadden – drums, percussion, harmonica, background vocals
- Bob Carpenter – vocals, piano, synthesizer, keyboards, keyboard bass, accordion

== Chart performance ==
Chart (1991)	Peak position
U.S. Billboard Top Country Albums	50
