= Rare Junk =

Studio album by Nitty Gritty Dirt Band
- Released: June 1968
- Genre: Country, country rock, folk rock, bluegrass
- Label: Liberty
- Producer: Dallas Smith

Nitty Gritty Dirt Band chronology
Ricochet (1967)	Rare Junk (1968)	Alive (1969)

Professional ratings
Review scores
Source	Rating
AllMusic	4/5 stars

Rare Junk is the third studio album by the Nitty Gritty Dirt Band, released in 1968. In an attempt to update their sound the band included electric instrumentation on the record, but it still was a commercial failure.

== Track listing ==
1. "Mournin' Blues" (Tony Sbarbaro) – 3:24
2. "Collegiana" (Jimmy McHugh, Dorothy Fields) – 2:38
3. "Willie the Weeper" (Grant Rymal, Walter Melrose, Marty Bloom) – 2:26
4. "Cornbread and 'Lasses (Sassafrass Tea)" (Lloyd "Lonzo" George, Rollin "Oscar" Sullivan) – 2:31
5. "These Days" (Jackson Browne) – 3:13
6. "Sadie Green The Vamp of New Orleans" (Gilbert Wells, Johnny Dunn) – 2:25
7. "Dr. Heckle and Mr. Jibe" (Dick McDonough) – 2:37
8. "End Of Your Line" (Chris Farrel) – 2:22
9. "Reason to Believe" (Tim Hardin) – 2:54
10. "Hesitation Blues (Oh! Baby Must I Hesitate?)" (Billy Smythe, Scott Middleton, Art Gillham) – 3:26
11. "A Number and a Name" (Steve Gillette, Tom Campbell) – 3:20

== Personnel ==
Nitty Gritty Dirt Band

- Ralph Barr – electric guitar, clarinet, acoustic guitar
- John McEuen – piano, plectrum banjo, five-string banjar
- Jeff Hanna – washboard, tambourine, drum, guitar, harmonica, electric guitar ...and other rare junk
- Jimmie Fadden – tube, jug, mouth harp, harmonica, washtub bass, drums
- Les Thompson – guitar, mandolin, electric bass, tambourine, plectrum banjo
- Chris Darrow – guitar, mandolin, violin, fiddle, electric bass, string bass

Contributing musicians

- Bernie Leadon – guitar on "Reason to Believe"
- Johnny Sandlin – drums
- Paul Hornsby – piano
- Rodney Dillard – Dobro

Production

- Producer – Dallas Smith
