= All the Good Times =

Studio album by Nitty Gritty Dirt Band
- Released: January 1972
- Recorded: 1971
- Genre: Country, country rock, folk rock, bluegrass
- Length: 42:15
- Label: United Artists
- Producer: William E. McEuen

Nitty Gritty Dirt Band chronology
Uncle Charlie & His Dog Teddy (1970)	All the Good Times (1972)	Will the Circle Be Unbroken (1972)

Professional ratings
Review scores
Source	Rating
AllMusic	3/5 stars

All the Good Times is the fifth studio album by the Nitty Gritty Dirt Band, released in January 1972.

== The Mini-Album ==
In addition to the full LP, the band's label United Artists also released a mini-album version of All the Good Times. It had the same name and consisted of two 7 inch 33 1/3 RPM records. The first record contains five songs from the original album, "Baltimore", "Sixteen Tracks", "Slim Carter", "Fish Song", and "Jamaica, Say You Will". The second record contains a country jam and interview.

The country jam side is a "spontaneous acoustic recording" of three songs: "All the Good Times", "When Will I Be Loved", and "Mobile Line".

The interview side was recorded in January 1972. On it, the Dirt Band discusses "Uncle Charlie vs. All the Good Times", "Acoustic Instruments", "Traditional Music", "Colorado Consciousness", and "Live Recording".

== Track listing ==
1. "Sixteen Tracks" (Jeff Hanna, Jim Ibbotson) – 5:22
2. "Fish Song" (Jimmie Fadden) – 4:28
3. "Jambalaya (On the Bayou)" (Hank Williams) – 3:20
4. "Down in Texas" (Eddie Hinton) – 2:20
5. "Creepin' Round Your Back Door" (Jimmie Fadden) – 2:52
6. "Daisy" (Jim Ibbotson) – 2:50
7. "Slim Carter" (Kenny O'Dell) – 3:02
8. "Hoping to Say" (David Hanna) – 3:20
9. "Baltimore" (Jim Ibbotson) – 3:44
10. "Jamaica, Say You Will" (Jackson Browne) – 3:29
11. "Do You Feel It Too" (Richie Furay) – 3:15
12. "Civil War Trilogy" (Walter McEuen) – 1:53
13. "Diggy Liggy Lo" (J.D. Miller) – 2:20

== Charts ==
Chart (1972)	Peak position
Australian (Kent Music Report)	47

== Personnel ==
- Jeff Hanna – arranger, guitar, vocals
- Jimmie Fadden – arranger, drums, guitar, harmonica, vocals
- John McEuen – arranger, guitar, steel guitar, vocals
- Jim Ibbotson - drums, guitar, keyboards, vocals
- Les Thompson – arranger, bass, guitar, vocals

Additional Musicians

- Randy Scruggs – acoustic guitar
- Norman Blake – dobro
- Ellis Padgett – acoustic bass
