= The Christmas Album (Nitty Gritty Dirt Band album) =

Studio album by Nitty Gritty Dirt Band
- Released: 1997
- Genre: Country, country rock, folk rock, bluegrass
- Length: 35:49
- Label: Rising Tide
- Producer: Nitty Gritty Dirt Band

Nitty Gritty Dirt Band chronology
Acoustic (1994)	The Christmas Album (1997)	Bang, Bang, Bang (1999)

Professional ratings
Review scores
Source	Rating
Allmusic	4/5 stars

The Christmas Album is the 1997 album from the Nitty Gritty Dirt Band. This album reached 93 on the US Country charts.

== Track listing ==
1. "Colorado Christmas" (Steve Goodman) – 3:39
2. "We Three Kings" (John Henry Hopkins Jr., traditional arrangement) – 3:02
3. "Christmas Dinner" (Ernest Ford) – 2:12
4. "One Christmas Tree" (Jimmy Ibbotson, Jeff Hanna) – 4:06
5. "Silent Night" (Franz Gruber, Joseph Mohr, traditional arrangement) – 3:54
6. "This Christmas Morning" (Bob Carpenter) – 3:40
7. "Silver Bells" (Jay Livingston, Ray Evans, traditional arrangement) – 2:55
8. "It Came Upon A Midnight Clear" (Edmund Sears, Arthur Sullivan, Richard Storrs Willis, traditional arrangement) – 3:16
9. "Love Has Brought Him Here" (Bob Carpenter, Tom Kell) – 3:04
10. "Little Drummer Boy" (Harry Simeone, Katherine Kennicott Davis, Henry Onorati, traditional arrangement) – 3:04
11. "Jingle Bells" (James Lord Pierpont, traditional arrangement) – 2:57

== Personnel ==
- Jeff Hanna – vocals, guitar
- Jim Ibbotson – vocals, guitar, mandolin, bass
- Jimmie Fadden – drums, harmonica
- Bob Carpenter – vocals, keyboards

With

- Chris Engleman – electric bass
- Gary Lunn – electric bass

Special Guest Musicians

- Alison Krauss – vocals on "Colorado Christmas", fiddle on "We Three Kings"
- John McEuen – 5-string banjo on "Colorado Christmas" and "We Three Kings", mandolin on "Colorado Christmas"
- Richie Furay – vocals on "One Christmas Tree" and "This Christmas Morning"
- Vassar Clements – fiddle on "Christmas Dinner"

== Production ==
- Producer – Nitty Gritty Dirt Band
