= The Dirt Band (album) =

Studio album by Nitty Gritty Dirt Band
- Released: 1978
- Genres: Soft rock, country rock, country pop, bluegrass
- Label: United Artists
- Producer: Jeff Hanna

Nitty Gritty Dirt Band chronology
Dirt, Silver and Gold (1976)	The Dirt Band (1978)	An American Dream (1979)

Professional ratings
Review scores
Source	Rating
Allmusic	3/5 stars

The Dirt Band is the tenth album from the Nitty Gritty Dirt Band.

== Track listing ==
1. "In For The Night" (Ed Sanford, John Townsend)
2. "Wild Nights" (Jeff Hanna, Jimmie Fadden)
3. "For a Little While" (Bob Carpenter, David James Holster)
4. "Lights" (Rick Roberts)
5. "Escaping Reality" (Casey Kelly)
6. "Whoa Babe" (Jimmie Fadden)
7. "White Russia" (John McEuen, William E. McEuen)
8. "You Can't Stop Loving Me Now" (Jeff Pollard)
9. "On The Loose" (Jeff Hanna)
10. "Angel" (Jeff Hanna, Jimmie Fadden)

== Personnel ==
- Jeff Hanna – lead vocals, electric guitar, percussion, guitars
- Jimmie Fadden – harp, vocals, syndrums, national guitar, percussion
- John McEuen – lap steel, banjo, acoustic guitar, steel guitar, mandolin, fiddle, dobro
- Bob Carpenter – piano, organ, accordion, backing vocals
- Richard Hathaway – bass, guitars, percussion
- Merle Bregante – drums, percussion
- Al Garth – saxophone, fiddle, horns, guitars, percussion, clarinet, recorders, electric piano

Additional musicians

- Leon Medica – bass, guitars
- Bobby Mason – electric rhythm guitar
- Mickey Thomas – scat vocals ("For A Little While")
- Michael McDonald – backing vocals
- Rosemary Butler – backing vocals
- Jan Garrett – backing vocals
- A. Haden Gregg – backing vocals
- Al Kooper – ARP strings
- Bryan Savage – horns
- Denny Christensen – horns
- Whoa Jane Cicero – percussion
- Greg "Fingers" Taylor – harp

== Production ==
- Producer – Jeff Hanna
- Engineer – Jerry Cell
