= The Nitty Gritty Dirt Band (album) =

Studio album by Nitty Gritty Dirt Band
- Released: February or March 1967
- Genres: Country; country rock; folk rock; bluegrass; skiffle; jug band; vaudeville; pop
- Label: Liberty
- Producer: Dallas Smith

Nitty Gritty Dirt Band chronology
The Nitty Gritty Dirt Band (1967)	Ricochet (1967)

Singles from The Nitty Gritty Dirt Band
- 1. "Buy for Me the Rain" Released: March 1967

Professional ratings
Review scores
Source	Rating
AllMusic	3/5 stars

The Nitty Gritty Dirt Band is the debut studio album by the Nitty Gritty Dirt Band, released in 1967. This album debuted on the U.S. Billboard Top Pop Albums chart on April 8, 1967, peaked at number 161, and was on the charts for eight weeks. The single "Buy for Me the Rain" b/w "Candy Man" debuted on the U.S. Billboard Hot 100 on April 8, 1967, peaked at number 45 on May 6, 1967, and was on the charts for seven weeks. In Canada, the single reached number 37 in May 1967.

== Content ==
The album liner notes were written by Tiger Beat feature editor Ann Moses. It focused mostly on what the members look like, nicknames, and personalities.

Two of the songs were written by Jackson Browne, who was a member of the group for a short period. He left before the recording of this album.

== Track listing ==
1. "Buy for Me the Rain" (Steve Noonan, Greg Copeland) – 2:23
2. "Euphoria" (Charlie Ventura, Roy Kral) – 1:27
3. "Melissa" (Jackson Browne) – 2:17
4. "You Took the Happiness (Out of My Head)" (Russ Regan) – 2:25
5. "Hard Hearted Hannah (The Vamp of Savannah)" (Jack Yellen, Milton Ager, Robert Wilcox Bigelow, Charles Bates) – 2:10
6. "Holding" (Jackson Browne) – 2:38
7. "Song to Jutta" (Bruce Kunkel) – 2:35
8. "Candy Man" (Rev. Gary Davis) – 2:29
9. "Dismal Swamp" (John McEuen, William E. McEuen) – 1:55
10. "I Wish I Could Shimmy Like My Sister Kate" (Armand J. Piron) – 1:50
11. "Crazy Words, Crazy Tune" (Jack Yellen, Milton Ager) – 1:27
12. "You're Gonna Get It in the End" (Michael Takamatsu, Jim Hendricks, Fred Olson) – 2:28

== Personnel ==
The Nitty Gritty Dirt Band

- Bruce "Spider Bones" Kunkel – guitar, kazoo, washtub bass
- Jeff "Spunky Duff" Hanna – washboard, sandblocks, guitar, comb, kazoo, Phinius
- Jimmy "Starch Harpo" Fadden – harmonica, washtub bass, Phinius, kazoo, cigarette
- "Raucous" Ralph Barr – guitar, kazoo, washtub bass, bubbles
- Les "Totally" Thompson – mandolin, kazoo, washtub bass, Phinius
- John "King O' Banjo" McEuen – banjo, washtub bass
- James SK Wān – slide whistle

Technical

- Armin Steiner - engineer
- John Stewart, William E. McEuen - photography
