= John Bunzow =

American country music singer-songwriter

- Born: May 2, 1951 (age 73); Portland, Oregon
- Genres: Americana
- Occupation: Singer-songwriter
- Instrument(s): Vocals, guitar
- Years active: 1995–present
- Labels: Liberty, ZoDog, Sideburn
- Website: www.johnbunzow.com

John Bunzow (born May 2, 1951) is an American country music singer-songwriter. Bunzow was signed to Liberty Records and charted one single on the Billboard Hot Country Singles & Tracks chart.

== Career ==
Bunzow was signed to Liberty Records (which was then the name of the Nashville subsidiary of Capitol Records) and released his debut single, "Easy as One, Two, Three", in 1995. Deborah Evans Price of Billboard gave the song a favorable review, writing that "Bunzow plays it simple, but keeps things interesting by throwing in some nifty chord-change curves." It peaked at number 69 on the Billboard Hot Country Singles & Tracks chart. Liberty planned to release Bunzow's album, Stories of the Years, on May 23, 1995. Pemberton Roach of AllMusic gave the album three stars out of five, calling it "a refreshingly direct, no-nonsense country record that had more in common with Steve Earle's best work than with any dance-club pretty boys." Alanna Nash of Entertainment Weekly gave the album an A grade, writing that Bunzow blends "an amiable tenor with economy of language and the minimalistic production of Dwight Yoakam collaborator Pete Anderson." After Jimmy Bowen left Liberty Records in March 1995 and the label returned to its Capitol Nashville name, the album was shelved and Bunzow was dropped.

Bunzow continued writing and performing. A compilation of material Bunzow wrote for publishing companies in Nashville, Off the Shelf, was released by ZoDog Records in 2000. In 2002, Bunzow recorded an album, Darkness and Light, which was released by independent label Sideburn Records. Bob Gottlieb of AllMusic gave the album four stars out of five, calling it "a strong disc that rips into each new song with a strong ferocity that brings the song home." Bunzow also released a live album, Alive at O'Connor's, in 2004.

== Discography ==
=== Albums ===
Title	Album details
Off the Shelf	Release date: 2000; Label: ZoDog Records
Darkness and Light	Release date: June 18, 2002; Label: Sideburn Records
Alive at O'Connor's	Release date: January 17, 2004; Label: ZoDog Records

=== Singles ===
Year	Single	Peak positions	Album
Year	Single	US Country	Album
1995	"Easy as One, Two, Three"	69	Stories of the Years (unreleased)

=== Music videos ===
Year	Video	Director
1995	"Easy as One, Two, Three"	Chris Lovett
