= Speed of Life (Nitty Gritty Dirt Band album) =

Studio album by Nitty Gritty Dirt Band
- Released: September 22, 2009
- Studio: Blackbird (Berry Hill, Tennessee)
- Genre: Country, country rock, folk rock, bluegrass
- Label: NGDB
- Producer: George Massenburg, Jon Randall Stewart

Nitty Gritty Dirt Band chronology
Welcome to Woody Creek (2004)	Speed of Life (2009)

Professional ratings
Review scores
Source	Rating
Allmusic	4/5 stars

Speed of Life is the 23rd studio album from the Nitty Gritty Dirt Band, released by NGDB Records on September 22, 2009. It reached number 59 on the U.S. Country charts.

== Track listing ==
1. "Tulsa Sounds Like Trouble to Me" (Shawn Camp, Mark D. Sanders) – 4:36
2. "Brand New Heartache" (Jeff Hanna, Donny Lowery) – 3:11
3. "The Resurrection" (Matraca Berg, Alice Randall) – 4:13
4. "Somethin' Dangerous" (Bob Carpenter, Tom Kell, Phil Soussan) – 3:25
5. "Going Up the Country" (Alan Wilson) – 4:15
6. "Jimmy Martin" (Phil Madeira, Jimmie Lee Sloas) – 3:35
7. "Lost in the Pines" (John McEuen) – 1:05
8. "Speed of Life" (Gary Scruggs) – 3:37
9. "Amazing Love" (Bob Carpenter, Jeff Hanna, Tom Kell) – 4:06
10. "Stuck in the Middle" (Joe Egan, Gerry Rafferty) – 3:42
11. "Earthquake" (Bob Carpenter, John McEuen) – 3:23
12. "Tryin' to Try" (Jimmie Fadden, Guy Clark) – 2:49
13. "Good To Be Alive" (Matraca Berg, Troy Verges) – 3:37

== Personnel ==
- Jeff Hanna – vocals, acoustic, electric and resonator guitars, slide guitar, mandolin
- Jimmie Fadden – vocals, drums, harmonica, percussion
- Bob Carpenter – vocals, Wurlitzer and grand pianos, accordion, Hammond organ
- John McEuen – 5-string banjo, mandolin, fiddle, lap steel, finger-style acoustic guitar

Additional musicians

- Jon Randall Stewart – acoustic guitar, mandolin, vocals
- Glenn Worf – electric and upright bass
- Richard Bennett – electric guitar, acoustic guitar, bouzouki, lap steel
- Vince Santoro – percussion, drums
- Matraca Berg – vocals
- Jessi Alexander – vocals
- Jaime Hanna – vocals

== Production ==
- Recorded live and mixed at: Blackbird Studio C, Nashville, TN.
- Assisted by: Kazuri Arai and Nathan Yarborough
- Produced and mixed by: George Massenburg and Jon Randall Stewart
- Mastered by: Doug Sax and George Massenburg
- Design: Gina Binkley/Alter Ego Design

== Chart performance ==
Chart (2009)	Peak position
U.S. Billboard Top Country Albums	59
