= Ricochet (Nitty Gritty Dirt Band album) =

Studio album by Nitty Gritty Dirt Band
- Released: June or July 1967
- Genre: Country, folk rock, bluegrass
- Length: 29:03
- Label: Liberty
- Producer: Dallas Smith

Nitty Gritty Dirt Band chronology
| The Nitty Gritty Dirt Band (1967) | Ricochet (1967) | Rare Junk (1968) |

Professional ratings
Review scores
| Source | Rating |
|---|---|
| Allmusic | 4/5 stars |

Ricochet is the second studio album by the Nitty Gritty Dirt Band. It was their second album of 1967, being released only a few months after their first album The Nitty Gritty Dirt Band.

== Track listing ==
1. "Shadow Dream Song" (Jackson Browne) – 3:50
2. "Ooh Po Pe Do Girl" (Jeff Hanna) – 3:20
3. "Coney Island Washboard" (Hampton Durand, Jerry Adams, Ned Nestor, Claude Shugart) – 3:43
4. "Put a Bar in My Car" (Reverend Gary Davis, Beasley Smith) – 3:08
5. "It's Raining Here in Long Beach" (Jackson Browne) – 3:36
6. "I'll Search the Sky" (Jeff Hanna) – 3:14
7. "Truly Right" (Michael Brewer, Tom Shipley) – 3:27
8. "Tide of Love" (Greg Copeland, Steve Noonan) – 3:06
9. "Happy Fat Annie" (Bruce Kunkel) – 4:35
10. "I'll Never Forget What's Her Name" (Harvey Gerst, I. Michael Kollander) – 3:45
11. "Call Again" (Bruce Kunkel) – 3:45
12. "The Teddy Bear's Picnic" (John Walter Bratton, Jimmy Kennedy) – 3:45

== Personnel ==
Nitty Gritty Dirt Band

- Jeff Hanna – guitar, mandolin, washboard, vocals
- Jimmie Fadden – guitar, harmonica, washtub bass, vocals
- Ralph Barr – guitar, clarinet, vocals
- Les Thompson – guitar, mandolin, vocals
- Bruce Kunkel – guitar, kazoo, vocals
- John McEuen – banjo, guitar, mandolin, washtub bass

Technical

- Armin Steiner - engineer
- John Stewart - photography
