= Let's Go (Nitty Gritty Dirt Band album) =

Studio album by Nitty Gritty Dirt Band
- Released: 1983
- Genre: Country, country rock, folk rock, bluegrass
- Label: Liberty
- Producer: Norbert Putnam, Richard Landis

Nitty Gritty Dirt Band chronology
Jealousy (1981)	Let's Go (1983)	Plain Dirt Fashion (1984)

Let's Go is the fourteenth studio album by American country folk group Nitty Gritty Dirt Band. This album marks the return of Nitty Gritty to the band name and Jim Ibbotson to the band. This album reached 26 on the US Country charts. Two singles from this album also charted. "Shot Full of Love" reached 19 on the US Country charts. "Dance Little Jean" reached 9 on the US Country charts.

== Track listing ==
No.	Title	Writer(s)	Length
1.	"Heartaches in Heartaches"	Andrew Gold	3:30
2.	"Special Look"	Jeff Hanna, Bob Carpenter	3:14
3.	"Shot Full of Love"	Bob McDill	3:23
4.	"Never Together (But Close Sometimes)"	Rodney Crowell	3:06
5.	"Goodbye Eyes"	Dave Loggins	3:23
6.	"Maryann"	Marshall Crenshaw	3:10
7.	"Too Many Heartaches in Paradise"	Jeff Wilson, Dolly Greer	4:00
8.	"Don't Get Sand in It"	Steve Goodman, Sean Kelly	3:28
9.	"Let's Go"	Hanna, Jimmie Fadden	3:06
10.	"Dance Little Jean"	Jimmy Ibbotson	3:12

== Personnel ==
- Jeff Hanna
- Jimmie Fadden
- John McEuen
- Jim Ibbotson
- Lead Vocals – Jeff Hanna, Jim Ibbotson
- Guitars – Jim Ibbotson, Steve Gibson, Jeff Hanna, George Doering, John McEuen, Fred Tackett, David Loggins, Barry Chance
- Bass Guitar – David Hungate, Norbert Putnam, Neil Stubenhaus
- Harmonica – Jimmie Fadden
- Banjo, Lap Steel Guitar – John McEuen
- Mandolin – John McEuen, Jim Ibbotson
- Keyboard – Bob Carpenter, Phil Aaberg, Richard Landis, Kyle Lehning
- Drums – James Stroud, Rick Shlosser, Ken Buttrey
- Drum Machine – Roger Linn
- Percussion – Jimmie Fadden, Farrell Morris, Jim Ibbotson, Richard Landis
- Background Vocals – Bob Carpenter, Jim Ibbotson, Jeff Hanna
- Background vocals on "Shot Full of Love" – Kenny Edwards, Andrew Gold, Allen Graham

== Production ==
- Producer – Norbert Putnam & Richard Landis

== Chart performance ==
Chart (1983)	Peak position
U.S. Billboard Top Country Albums	26
