= Nitty Gritty Dirt Band =

American band

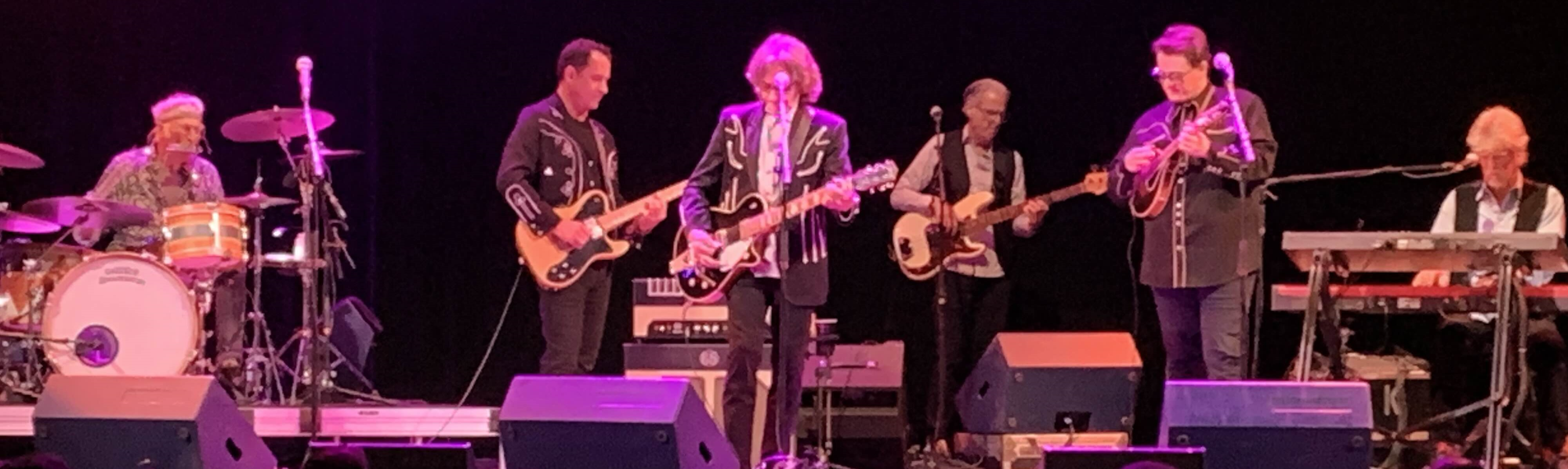
- Nitty Gritty Dirt Band in 2024 (L–R: Jimmie Fadden, Jaime Hanna, Jeff Hanna, Jim Photoglo, Ross Holmes, and Bob Carpenter)

Background information
- Also known as: Illegitimate Jug Band; The Toot Uncommons; The Dirt Band
- Origin: Long Beach, California, United States
- Genres: Country; folk; folk rock; country rock; bluegrass
- Works: Nitty Gritty Dirt Band discography
- Years active: 1966–present
- Labels: Liberty; United Artists; Warner; Universal; MCA Nashville; Rising Tide; DreamWorks; Dualtone; Sugar Hill; NGDB
- Members: Jeff Hanna; Jimmie Fadden; Bob Carpenter; Jaime Hanna; Ross Holmes; Jim Photoglo
- Past members: See list of members
- Website: www.nittygritty.com

Nitty Gritty Dirt Band (sometimes abbreviated NGDB), also known as the Dirt Band, is an American band founded in Long Beach, California, in 1966. Since 2018, the band has consisted of Jeff Hanna and his son Jaime Hanna, both guitarists and vocalists, along with Jimmie Fadden (drums, harmonica, vocals), Bob Carpenter (keyboards, accordion, vocals), Ross Holmes (fiddle, mandolin, vocals), and Jim Photoglo (bass guitar, vocals).

Jeff Hanna and Fadden founded Nitty Gritty Dirt Band in 1966 with a lineup initially consisting of Bruce Kunkel, Ralph Barr, Les Thompson, and Jackson Browne, who quit early on and was replaced by longtime member John McEuen (vocals, guitar, banjo). The band had its first hit single in 1967 with "Buy for Me the Rain" on Liberty Records. Their earliest work featured jug band and traditional folk elements. In 1970, Nitty Gritty Dirt Band had their biggest pop hit with a cover of Jerry Jeff Walker's "Mr. Bojangles". Their sound took on elements of soft rock in the latter half of the 1970s and early 1980s, including the hit singles "An American Dream" and "Make a Little Magic".

Starting in the early 1980s, Nitty Gritty Dirt Band began a shift toward country music, led off by the singles "Shot Full of Love" and "Dance Little Jean". By this point, the band consisted of Jeff Hanna, McEuen, Fadden, Carpenter, and Jimmy Ibbotson (bass guitar, vocals). This lineup recorded several country albums for Warner Records throughout the 1980s and charted multiple singles on Billboard Hot Country Songs. Of these, "Long Hard Road (The Sharecropper's Dream)", "Modern Day Romance", and "Fishin' in the Dark" all went to number one, with the last becoming their signature song. After leaving Warner in the late 1980s, Nitty Gritty Dirt Band recorded for several other labels, including Universal, MCA Nashville, Rising Tide, and DreamWorks Records. They have collaborated with a number of artists, including Doc Watson, Linda Ronstadt, John Denver, and Steve Martin. In addition, Jeff Hanna co-wrote the song "Bless the Broken Road", the most successful version of which was recorded by Rascal Flatts.

Nitty Gritty Dirt Band is also known for three collaborative albums: Will the Circle Be Unbroken in 1972, Will the Circle Be Unbroken: Volume Two in 1989, and Will the Circle Be Unbroken, Volume III in 2002. All three featured a large number of guests from folk, rock, country, and bluegrass. They have also won three Grammy Awards. Critics have found influences of country, pop, rock, bluegrass, and folk music in their sound.

== History ==
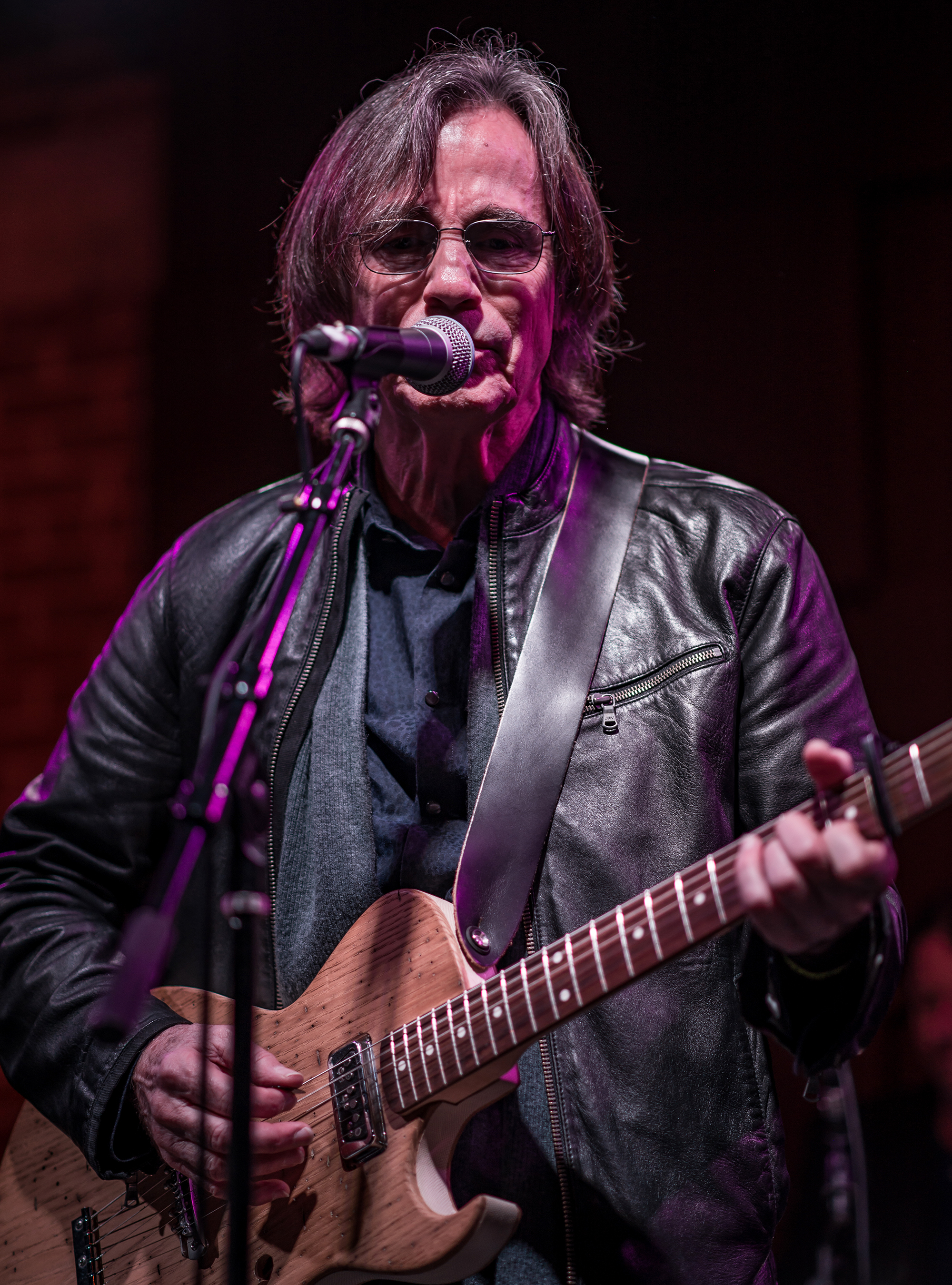
Jackson Browne was a founding member of Nitty Gritty Dirt Band.

Nitty Gritty Dirt Band was founded in Long Beach, California, in 1966. Founding guitarist Jeff Hanna was born and raised in Detroit, Michigan, but his family had moved to Long Beach four years prior. While in high school, he befriended guitarist Bruce Kunkel, and the two played in a local duo called the New Coast Two. As they wanted to form a larger group, the two began playing impromptu jam sessions at a music store called McCabe's Guitar Shop, located in Santa Monica. Through these performances, they recruited four other musicians. These were Jimmie Fadden, who at the time played washtub bass, harmonica, and guitar, along with Ralph Barr (guitar, clarinet), Les Thompson (guitar, mandolin), and Jackson Browne (guitar). All six members also served as vocalists. Browne quit the group after only a few months, and was replaced by John McEuen, who contributed on guitar, mandolin, banjo, and washtub bass. They briefly called themselves the Illegitimate Jug Band, due to their playing jug band music without actually having a member who played the jug. Soon afterward, they selected Nitty Gritty Dirt Band as a name, inspired by their observation that many bands at the time had names that they considered long and unusual, such as Strawberry Alarm Clock.

=== 1967–1971: Early years ===
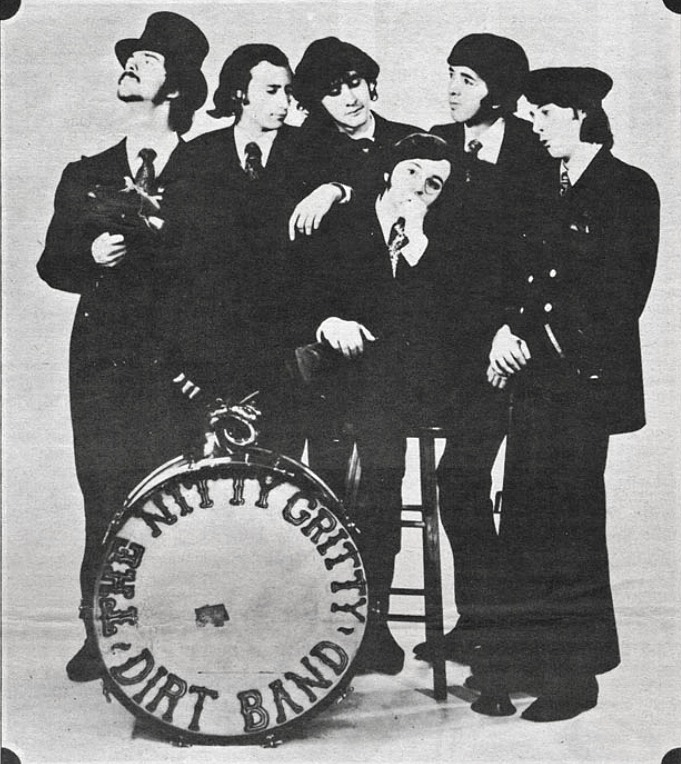
Nitty Gritty Dirt Band in 1967

John's older brother William E. McEuen served as the band's manager, helping to book them as opening acts for artists such as Joan Baez. He also helped the band sign a contract with Liberty Records, which released their self-titled debut album in 1967. "Buy for Me the Rain" was released as a single from this project, and it reached number 45 on the Billboard Hot 100. Another album for Liberty, Ricochet, followed later in 1967. After this album, Kunkel quit over creative differences in the band's sound, and was replaced by multi-instrumentalist Chris Darrow, formerly a member of Kaleidoscope. Of their style at the time, Mary Campbell of the Associated Press noted their use of acoustic instruments and rudimentary traditional folk instruments such as washtub bass, kazoo, and comb and paper. She also noted that their clothing and song choices, such as a cover of "Teddy Bears' Picnic", reflected the music and mindset of the 1920s.

Their third album, 1968's Rare Junk, was their first to feature electric guitar, electric bass, and drums. Although Browne had left by this point, they covered his "These Days" on it. Johnny Sandlin contributed on drums and Paul Hornsby on piano. Both were members of the band Hour Glass at the time also managed by Bill McEuen. Bob Talbert of The State praised the album for the variety of instruments used, noting that said variety allowed influences of jazz and country music on top of the group's existing jug band sound. A year later, Liberty released a live album titled Alive, recorded at the Troubadour in West Hollywood, California. That same year, the band contributed the song "Hand Me Down That Can o' Beans" to the soundtrack of the movie Paint Your Wagon, starring Lee Marvin. The band briefly broke up in December 1968. During this hiatus, Hanna and Darrow joined Linda Ronstadt's country rock tour band called the Corvettes, who recorded one session with Michael Nesmith of the Monkees as producer.

Nitty Gritty Dirt Band reunited in June 1969, although Darrow and Barr declined to rejoin. Both were replaced by Jimmy Ibbotson, who played bass guitar, drums, piano, and accordion. After reuniting, the band issued its fourth Liberty album Uncle Charlie & His Dog Teddy that same year. Colin Larkin, in the Virgin Encyclopedia of Country Music, wrote that this album marked a shift in their sound from "jokey elements" to a more country rock sound. It featured a cover of Jerry Jeff Walker's "Mr. Bojangles". Their version of the song was their first major hit, reaching number nine on the Hot 100. Also charting from the album were covers of Kenny Loggins's "House at Pooh Corner" and Nesmith's "Some of Shelly's Blues". Richie Unterberger of AllMusic wrote of this album, "The group moved into a more accessible rock-oriented fusion of country, bluegrass, pop, and rock & roll, relying primarily on smartly chosen covers...Few bands had incorporated instruments more commonly associated with country and bluegrass, particularly mandolin and banjo, as comfortably into a rock setting prior to this release, and their well-crafted harmonies help put the songs over for those not-steeped-in backwoods sounds."

=== 1972–1977: United Artists Records and Will the Circle Be Unbroken ===
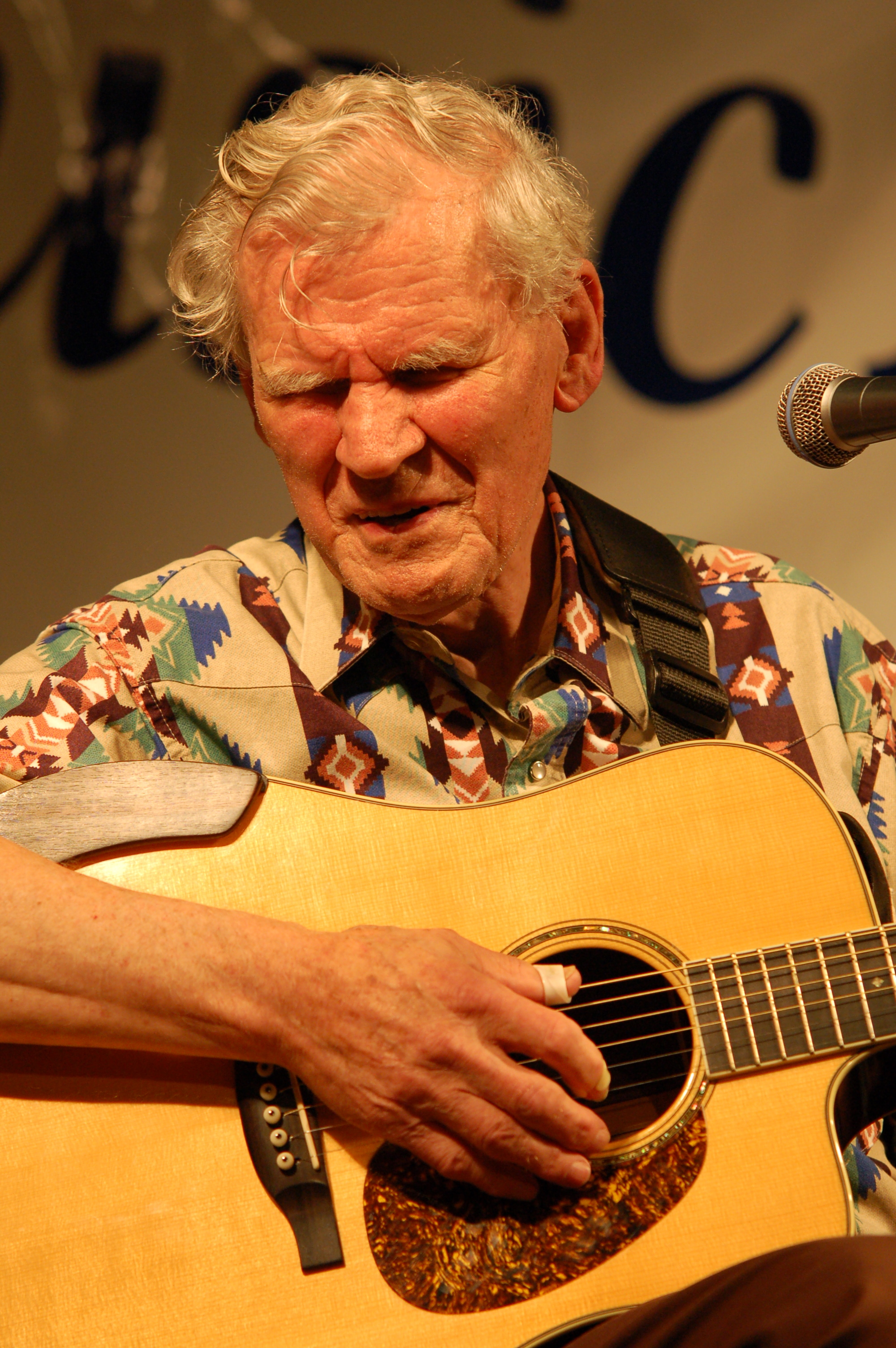
Nitty Gritty Dirt Band's 1972 album Will the Circle Be Unbroken featured a number of collaborators, including Doc Watson.

Liberty Records merged with United Artists Records in 1972. Their first project for this label was 1972's All the Good Times. The album had further cover songs on it, including Hank Williams's "Jambalaya (On the Bayou)" and Doug Kershaw's "Diggy Liggy Lo", as well as another Jackson Browne cover, "Jamaica Say You Will". The former of these was issued as a single, but peaked in the lower end of the Hot 100. Hartford Courant writer Henry McNulty found the cover songs superior to the original cuts on the album, but criticized the inclusion of fake applause between tracks.

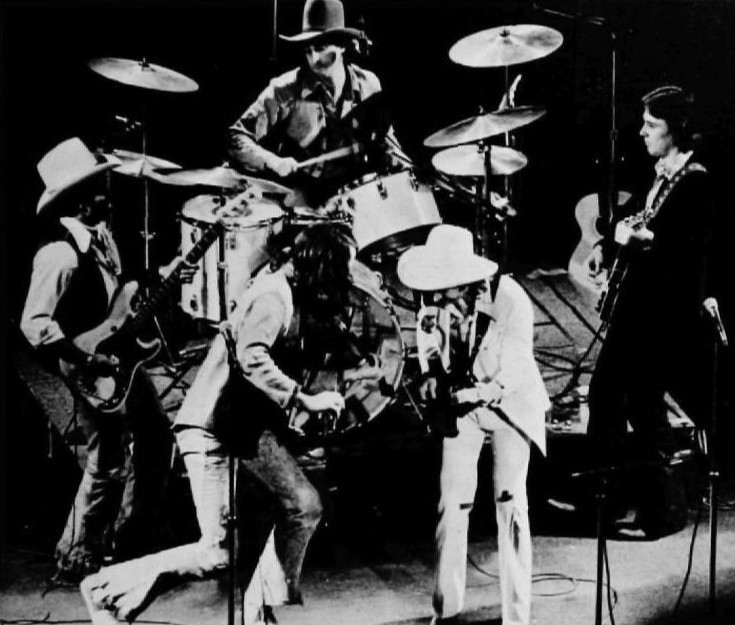
The band in 1976

Also in 1972, the band traveled to Nashville, Tennessee, to record the album Will the Circle Be Unbroken. This was a collaborative three-disc album featuring a number of country and bluegrass artists, such as Roy Acuff, Maybelle Carter, Earl Scruggs, and Doc Watson. Writing for The Los Angeles Times, Robert Hillburn thought that the band showed appreciation for the music of the collaborators, and that the album would appeal to music fans who did not like the then-contemporary Nashville sound. The album also accounted for Nitty Gritty Dirt Band's first entries on the Billboard Hot Country Songs charts: a cover of Hank Williams's "I Saw the Light" and the original "Grand Ole Opry Song", respectively featuring guest vocals from Roy Acuff and Jimmy Martin. Following the commercial success of Will the Circle Be Unbroken, they began touring across the United States and internationally. McEuen also began recording as a solo artist at this point, despite staying a member of the band. Larkin noted that critical reception of Will the Circle Be Unbroken "played an important role in breaking down mistrust between country's establishment and the emerging 'long hair' practitioners." Similarly, Watson later attributed the album's success to renewed interest in his music, particularly among fans of rock music who did not typically listen to folk and bluegrass. The "I Saw the Light" cover accounted for their first Grammy Award nomination, in the category of Best Country Performance by a Duo or Group with Vocal; a year later, the album itself was nominated in the same category. In 1997, the project became their first album to be certified platinum by the Recording Industry Association of America (RIAA).

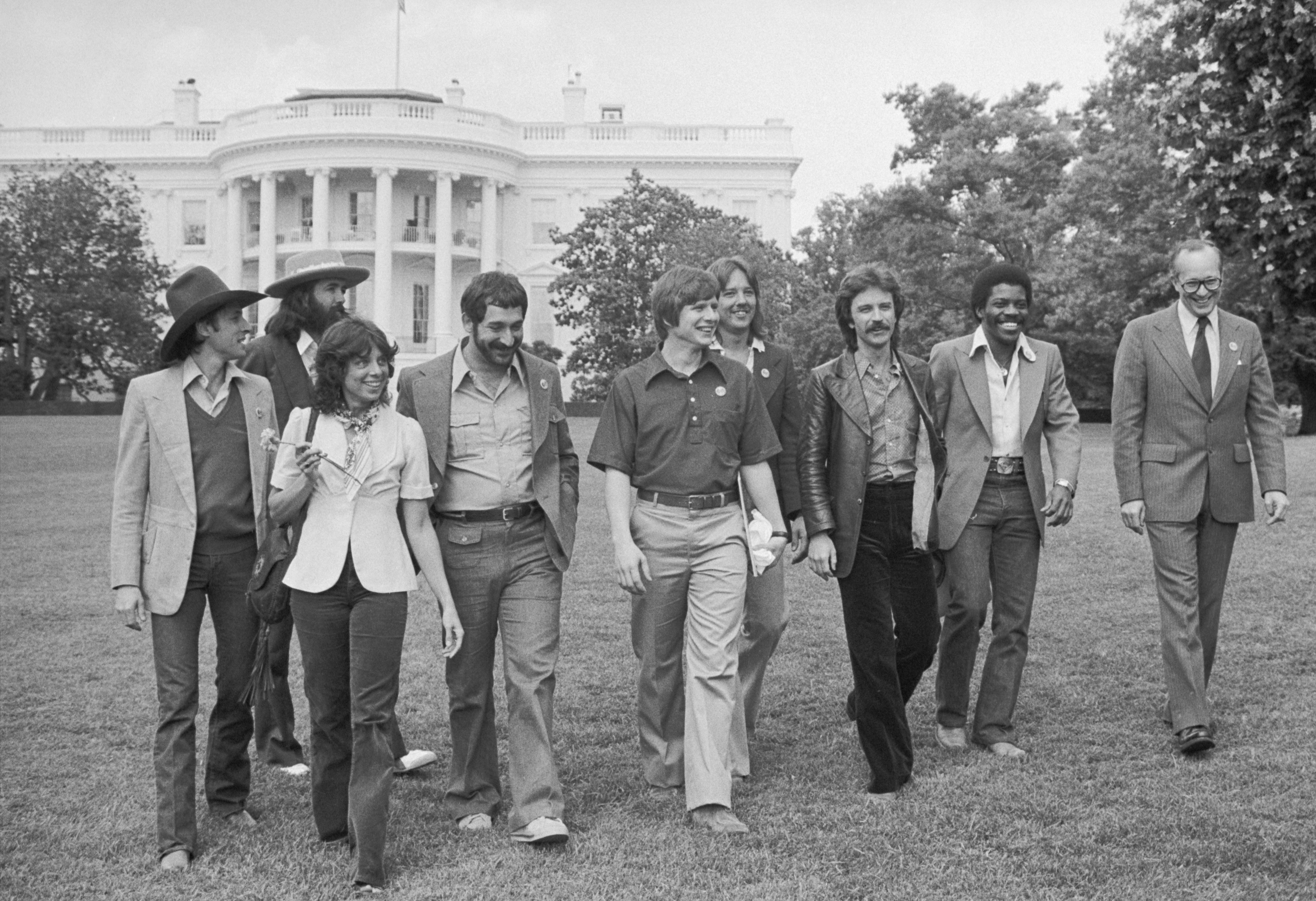
The band walking on the White House lawn with Jimmy Carter's son Chip in 1977

Their next album for United Artists was 1974's Stars and Stripes Forever. By this point, Thompson had left, as well, leaving the band as a quartet. A cover of Johnny Horton's "The Battle of New Orleans" charted from this project. The album, composed of both live and studio recordings, also featured interview segments by fiddle player Vassar Clements. Bruce Eder wrote that these elements made the album "more than its money's worth" and capable of showing their mix of country and rock influences. A year later, they released Symphonion Dream, led off by a cover of the Everly Brothers's "All I Have to Do Is Dream". The album featured guest contributions from Linda Ronstadt, Leon Russell, and actor Gary Busey. Eder found influences of psychedelic rock and bluegrass in the instrumentation, highlighting the instrumentals, as well as in the other cover songs on the album such as Hank Williams's "Hey, Good Lookin". Ibbotson left the band after this album, after which point John Cable and Jackie Clark joined. These two alternated as bassists and guitarists. Soon after they joined, Nitty Gritty Dirt Band toured in the Soviet Union. The United States Department of State oversaw the tour, which lasted for 28 days. This was followed by their first greatest-hits package, Dirt, Silver and Gold, also in 1976.

=== 1978–1981: The Dirt Band and shift to soft rock ===
In 1978, both Clark and Cable left, and the group shortened its name to the Dirt Band. McEuen said that the name change was due to disc jockeys not being comfortable with the longer name. Conversely, music writer Tom Roland attributed the name change to Chuck Morris, who had taken over as the band's manager due to William E. McEuen becoming overwhelmed by the role. Also according to John McEuen, Clark left voluntarily, while he believes that Hanna "got rid" of Cable because he felt "threatened" by Cable's songwriting ability. Joining Hanna, John McEuen, and Fadden as members were drummer Merel Bergante, bassist Richard Hathaway, and Al Garth, who played multiple instruments including saxophone and keyboards. The first release under the shortened name was 1978's The Dirt Band. "In for the Night" reached the lower regions of the Hot 100 as a single from this project. Stephen Thomas Erlewine of AllMusic considered the album to mark a shift in sound to a soft rock style. He thought the songs on the album were consistent in quality, but also that it would not appeal to fans of their earlier works. Also during 1978, the band appeared under the pseudonym the Toot Uncommons as backing musicians on comedian and actor Steve Martin's novelty hit single "King Tut". This appearance was due to William E. McEuen serving as producer on the track.

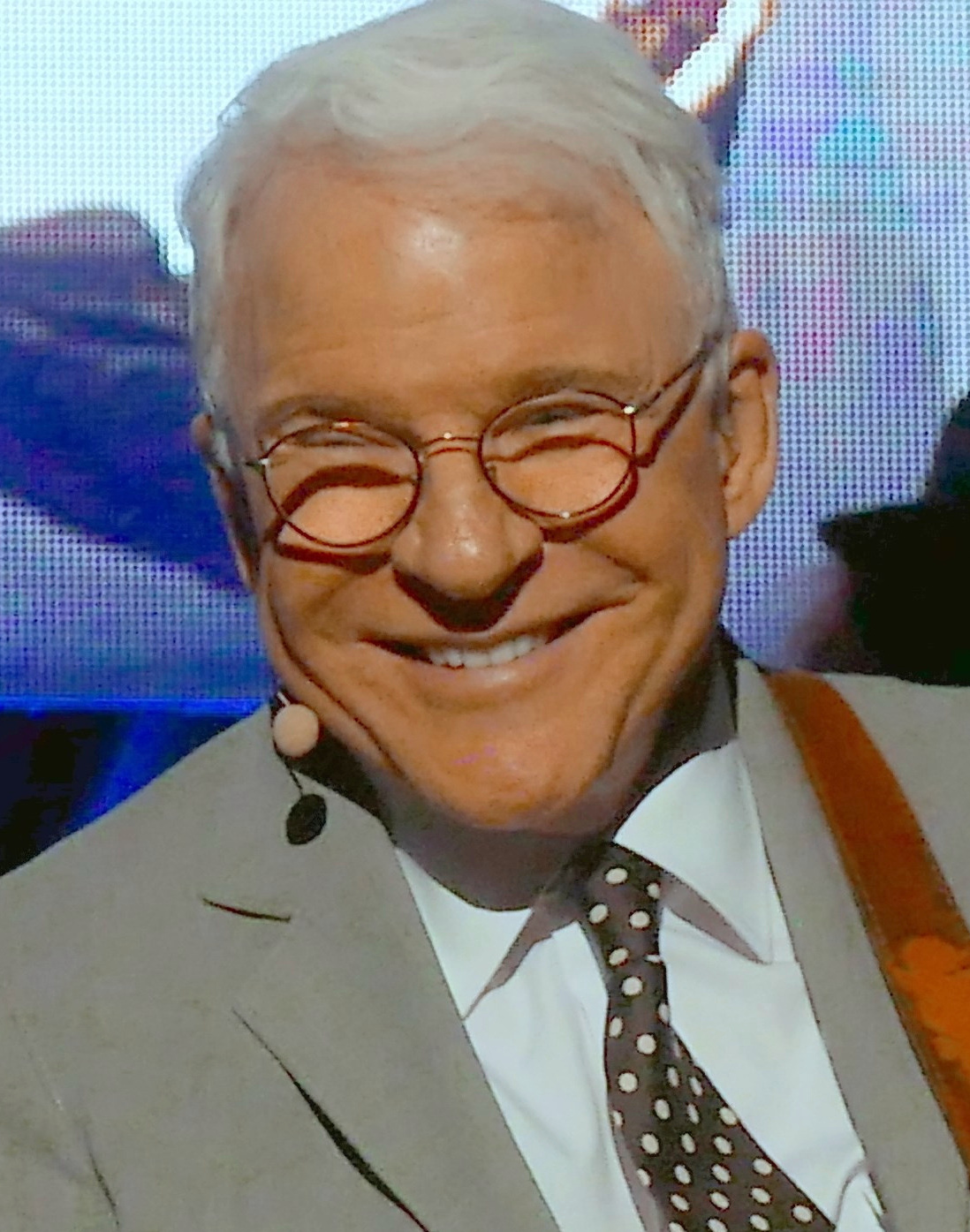
Nitty Gritty Dirt Band collaborated with Steve Martin on his novelty single "King Tut".

Their second album as the Dirt Band was 1979's An American Dream. The album's title track, written by Rodney Crowell, was released as a single in 1980. The song featured a backing vocal from Linda Ronstadt. It accounted for their second-highest Hot 100 peak of 13, and was also their first appearance on the Billboard country music charts since 1973. During the release of this album, Michael Buono took over for Bergante on drums, while Bob Carpenter joined as keyboardist. Next was 1980's Make a Little Magic. Featuring backing vocals from Nicolette Larson, its title track was a number 25 hit on the Hot 100. Ken Paulson of the Fort Myers, Florida, News Press noted that, unlike their previous albums, it contained only one cover song; specifically, Cidny Bullens's "Anxious Heart". He opined that by focusing more on original material, the album showed the band members' strengths as songwriters and performers, and considered it their best album yet.

After this album, EMI eliminated the United Artists label and reopened Liberty Records, transferring them back to that label after a decade. Their first release upon returning to Liberty was 1981's Jealousy. Most of the members wrote the songs on the album by themselves, and Hanna co-produced the album. Also by this point, Vic Mastrionni had become the band's drummer. "Fire in the Sky" was released as a single. The title track was, as well, but it did not chart. The album featured guest vocals from Kenny Loggins. An uncredited review in the New Jersey Daily Record panned the album's soft rock sound and lack of variety between tracks, as well as the songs on which Carpenter sang lead vocals. Likewise, Erlewine said that they "never quite mustered" the soft rock sound of the album, and criticized many of the songs for lacking hooks.

=== 1983–1984: Shift to country ===
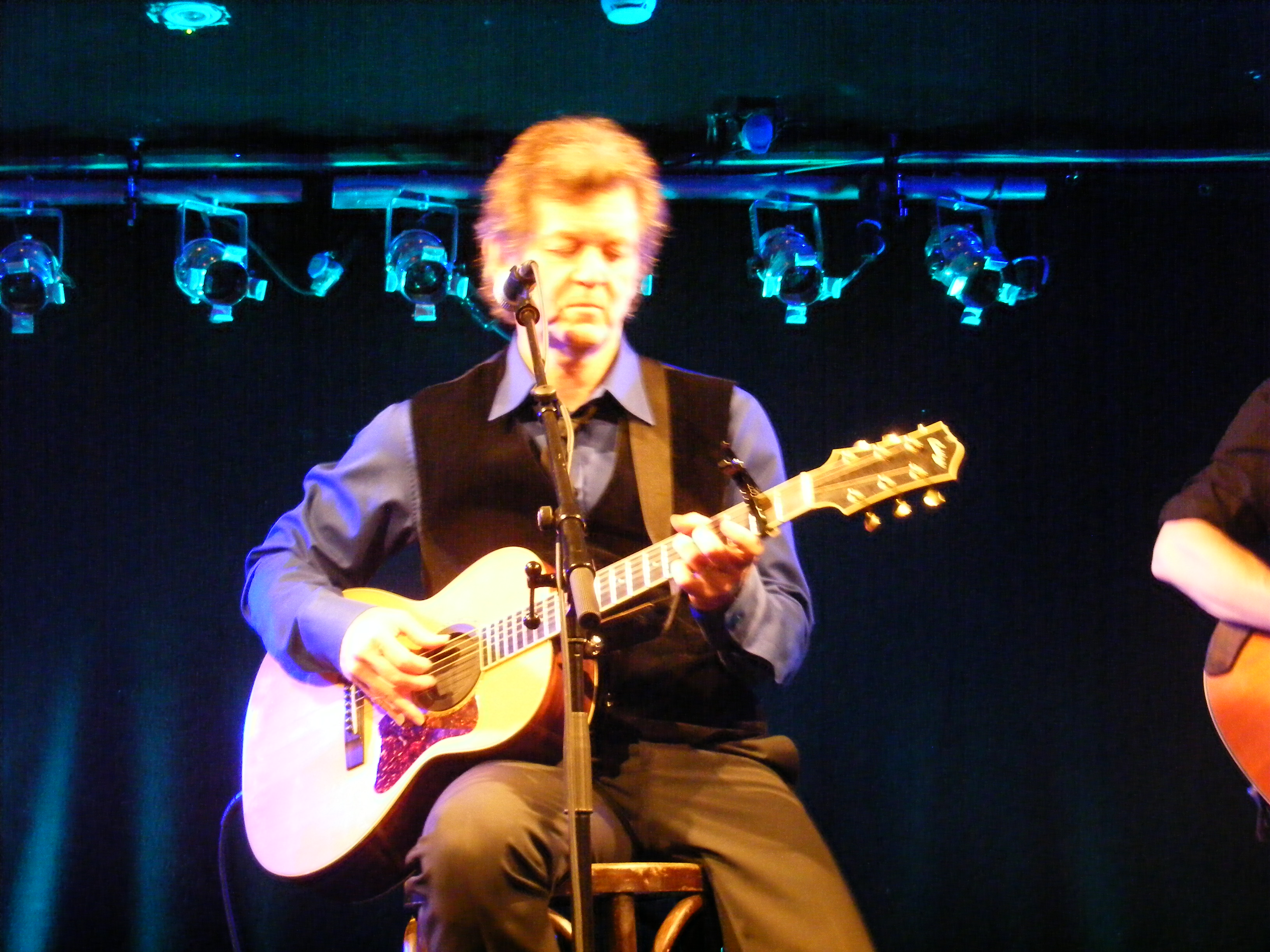
Rodney Crowell wrote the band's singles "An American Dream" and "Long Hard Road".

In the early 1980s, the band reverted its name to Nitty Gritty Dirt Band. This coincided with a membership change: Ibbotson rejoined in 1981 after a five-year hiatus, while Fadden began playing drums in addition to his existing role as vocalist and harmonica player. At the time, the other members of the quintet were Hanna, McEuen, and Carpenter. The first release to be successful on the country charts was "Shot Full of Love", which went to number 19 on the Hot Country Songs charts in 1983. This was followed by Ibbotson's composition "Dance Little Jean", which went to number nine. Both were included on the album Let's Go, their last after rejoining Liberty. Norbert Putnam and Richard Landis co-produced the project. This album marked a shift to country music, a move which Hanna attributed to changing tastes among fans of rock and pop music. McEuen, meanwhile, attributed the shift to country, return of Ibbotson to the lineup, and reversion of the name to Nitty Gritty Dirt Band as conditions agreed upon by Morris, who was seeking to make the band more successful again after the failure of Jealousy.

The band began recording their next album, Plain Dirt Fashion, while still on Liberty. However, Morris was uncertain if the label would promote the album properly, as it was the last one in their contract. As a result, they transferred to Warner Records, which released it in 1984. Furthering their move to country music, they also switched booking agents, which resulted in them opening shows for Ricky Skaggs and Hank Williams Jr. Paul Worley and Marshall Morgan served as producers on the project. According to Ibbotson, the band chose to switch producers after moving to Warner, as they thought Putnam's and Landis's production styles were not suitable for country. In addition to the five members, other contributors included Skaggs and Jerry Douglas. The project also included a cover of Bruce Springsteen's "Cadillac Ranch". The lead single was another Rodney Crowell composition, "Long Hard Road (The Sharecropper's Dream)", which in 1984 became their first number-one single on the Billboard country charts. Also issued as singles were "I Love Only You" (written by Dave Loggins and Don Schlitz) and "High Horse" (written by Ibbotson), both of which were top-five country hits between late 1984 and early 1985. Writing for the Mattoon, Illinois, Journal Gazette, Rickey Ferguson found a country influence through the "storytelling lyrics" of "Long Hard Road".

=== 1985–1987: Middle years with Warner ===
Next on Warner was Partners, Brothers and Friends in 1985. The album's lead single was "Modern Day Romance", written by Kix Brooks, who later became half of Brooks & Dunn. Upon release, this song became Nitty Gritty Dirt Band's second number-one on the Billboard country charts. Worley noted that the song had originally been submitted to them for inclusion on Plain Dirt Fashion, but was rejected, and they chose to record it after it was submitted to them a second time. Also charting in the top 10 from this album were "Home Again in My Heart" and the title track, which Hanna and Ibbotson co-wrote. While not released as a single, the album track "Telluride" (also written by Ibbotson) was made into a music video. Robert K. Oermann of The Tennessean noted that the lyrics of "Partners, Brothers and Friends" contained several references to the band's career up to that point. Holly Gleason of The Miami Herald reviewed the album favorably, praising Hanna's and Ibbotson's lead vocals and the lyrics of the title track. Following in 1986 was their second greatest-hits package, Twenty Years of Dirt. It was accompanied by an anniversary concert tour of the same name, featuring a 10,000-person show in Denver, Colorado, with Michael Martin Murphey. The album included the new song "Stand a Little Rain". Both this and a re-release of "Fire in the Sky" were sent to country radio as singles, with both reaching top 10.

This was followed in 1987 by Hold On, led off by the single "Baby's Got a Hold on Me". It reached number two on the country charts upon release. Following it was their third and final number one, "Fishin' in the Dark", written by Wendy Waldman and Jim Photoglo. Ed Bruce had recorded the song a year prior. For this album, they again switched producers to Josh Leo. He found "Fishin' in the Dark" when searching for songs, and upon hearing Photoglo's demonstration recording of the song, immediately suggested the band record it. Hanna later described it as Nitty Gritty Dirt Band's signature song and a popular song to play during the summertime. The song was certified gold as a music download in 2011, and increased to platinum in 2014. The album's third and final single was "Oh What a Love", also written by Ibbotson. Writing for the Palm Beach Post, Holly Gleason praised Leo's "perfectly pretty production" and Ibbotson's vocals on "Fishin' in the Dark", while also finding influences of country rock and Cajun music on individual tracks. She also compared the track "Joe Knows How to Live" (later a number-one single for Eddy Raven) to "An American Dream".

=== 1988–1989: Departure of John McEuen and Will the Circle Be Unbroken: Volume Two ===
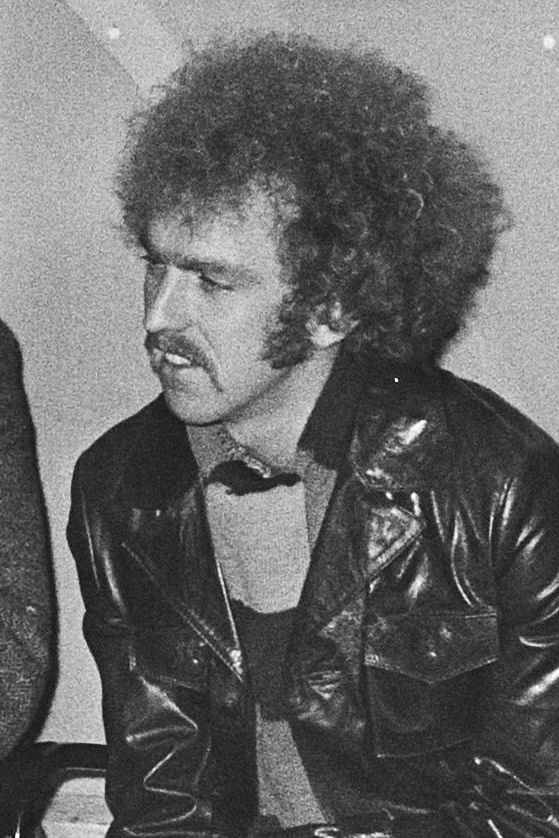
Bernie Leadon briefly joined Nitty Gritty Dirt Band in 1987.

During promotion for Hold On, McEuen quit to raise his family. He was replaced by Bernie Leadon, formerly of the Eagles and Flying Burrito Brothers. Leadon's only in-studio appearance with the band was on 1988's Workin' Band. This project charted three singles within the top ten of the Billboard country charts: "Workin' Man (Nowhere to Go)", "I've Been Lookin'", and "Down That Road Tonight". Fadden wrote the former, while Hanna co-wrote the latter two. Leadon left after this album as well, reducing the lineup to a quartet of Fadden, Hanna, Carpenter, and Ibbotson. An uncredited review in The Tennessean praised the use of acoustic instruments and the "crisp" nature of Josh Leo's production style, as well as the "urgency" of the singing.

In 1989, the band transferred to Universal Records, then a new country label started by producer Jimmy Bowen. Their only release for the label was Will the Circle Be Unbroken: Volume Two, a sequel album to their 1972 album Will the Circle Be Unbroken. Like its predecessor, it featured a large number of guest musicians, including Johnny Cash, Earl Scruggs, Bruce Hornsby, Levon Helm, Marty Stuart, and Vince Gill. Many of the guests appeared on the title track, a cover of A. P. Carter's "Will the Circle Be Unbroken". Earl Scruggs's son, Randy, produced the album. The album featured over 200 guests in total, and was recorded between December 1988 and January 1989. Universal simultaneously released three songs as lead singles from the project. These were a cover of Bob Dylan's "You Ain't Going Nowhere" featuring Roger McGuinn and Chris Hillman on lead vocals, as well as the original compositions "Turn of the Century" and "And So It Goes", the latter a collaboration with John Denver. The Dylan cover, credited solely to McGuinn and Hillman, peaked at number six on the country charts upon release. The other two singles were less successful, but follow-up "When It's Gone" peaked at number ten, becoming their last top-40 country single. Released last from the project was "One Step over the Line", featuring guest vocals from Rosanne Cash and John Hiatt. The album won the Grammy Award for Best Country Performance by a Duo or Group with Vocal, the track "The Valley Road" (a collaboration with Hornsby) won Best Bluegrass Recording, and the title track was nominated for Best Country Collaboration with Vocals at the 32nd Grammy Awards in 1990. Will the Circle Be Unbroken also won Album of the Year from the Country Music Association, their only win from that organization.

=== 1990s: Label changes ===
After Universal closed, Nitty Gritty Dirt Band transferred to MCA Nashville Records for 1990's The Rest of the Dream. Randy Scruggs also produced this project, and Carpenter observed that the track "Wishing Well" was the first time every band member wrote a song together. Serving as lead single was another Bruce Springsteen cover, this time of "From Small Things (Big Things One Day Come)". Neither this song nor "You Make Life Good Again" was successful on the charts. Hanna later stated that covering "From Small Things" and recording a song written by every member of the band were both objectives of his for nearly a decade prior. Bruce Mason of The Province praised the use of mandolin in the production, as well as the number of John Hiatt cover songs.

This project was followed in 1992 by Live Two Five, a live album recorded a year prior in Alberta, Canada. The band returned to Liberty a third time for 1992's Not Fade Away, titled after a cover of the Buddy Holly song "Not Fade Away". Suzy Bogguss provided guest vocals on the track "Don't Underestimate Love". This project charted the singles "I Fought the Law" (a cover of the Bobby Fuller Four) and "One Good Love". It also included covers of Merle Haggard's "Mama Tried" and the Dennis Linde composition "What'll You Do About Me", previously recorded by Randy Travis and later a single for Doug Supernaw in 1995. Writing for the Elmira, New York Star-Gazette, Dennis Miller praised the covers in particular, as well as the vocal harmony and "uncluttered musical arrangements."

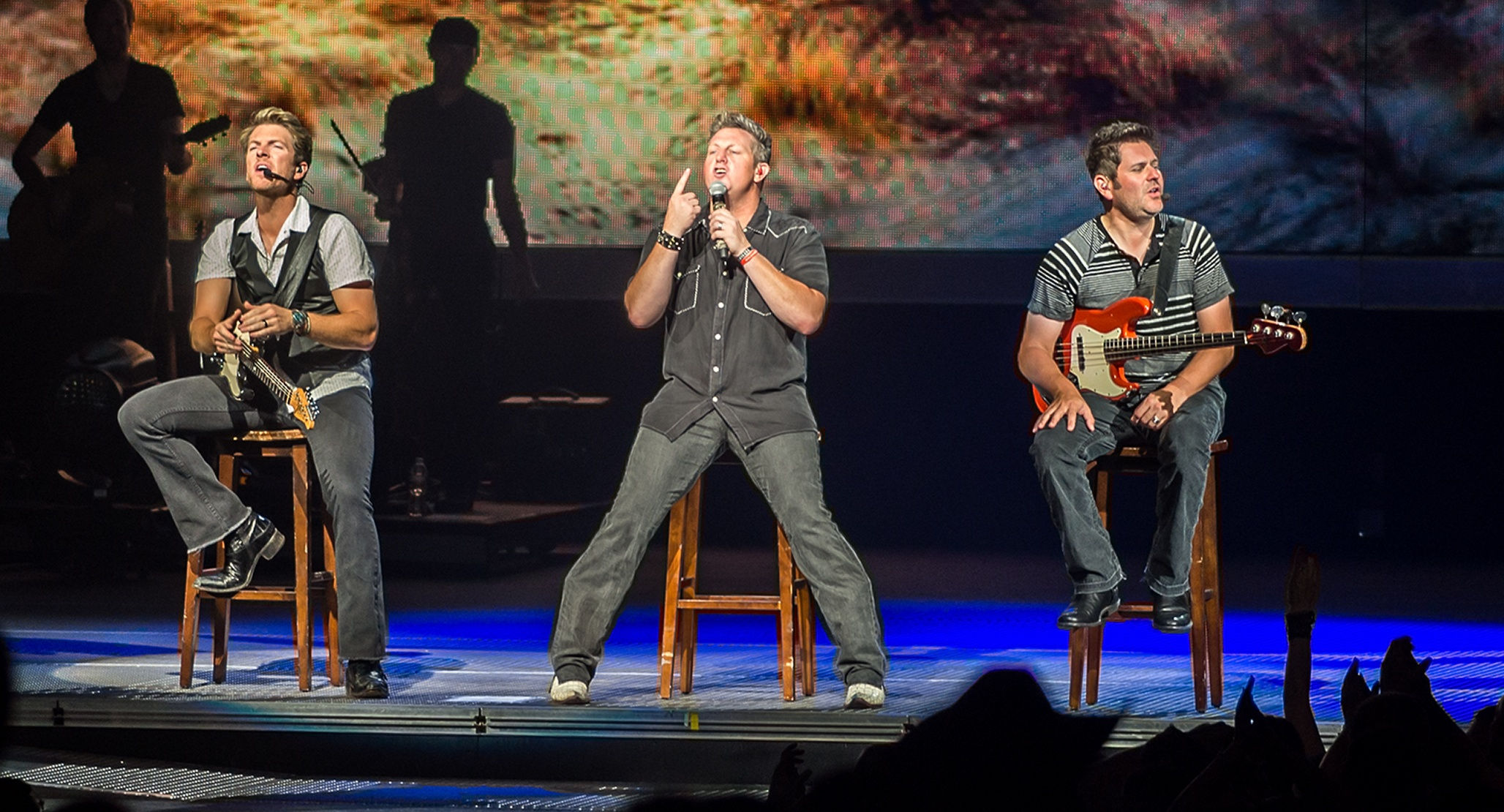
Jeff Hanna co-wrote "Bless the Broken Road", originally recorded by Nitty Gritty Dirt Band and later a hit single for Rascal Flatts, pictured in 2013.

Next on Liberty was 1994's Acoustic, composed entirely of acoustic songs. Jim Newsom of AllMusic called the album "refreshingly unadorned" and praised the use of instruments such as Dobro and accordion. Entertainment Weekly writer Bob Cannon was less favorable, writing, "They're always competent, with shimmering three-part harmonies and stellar musicianship, but that doesn't compensate for their generally forgettable songwriting." The album's closing track is "Bless the Broken Road", which Hanna wrote with Bobby Boyd and Marcus Hummon. Hummon later recorded the song himself, as did Melodie Crittenden, whose version was a charted single in 1998. Rascal Flatts also covered the song in 2005 and took their version to number one on the country charts, while Crittenden also charted the song a second time as a collaboration with the Christian group Selah.

The band released no further projects until 1997's The Christmas Album on Rising Tide Records. This project contained a mix of traditional Christmas songs and new material mostly written by the band members. While on Rising Tide, they recorded another album titled Bang Bang Bang, whose title track charted ahead of the album's release. However, the album was delayed due to the closure of Rising Tide and transferred to Decca Records, which also closed before it could be released. It was ultimately issued in 1998 through DreamWorks Records, which also re-released the title track and caused it to chart a second time. The project included a cover of Mac McAnally's "Down the Road", previously a single for him in 1990 and later re-released in 2008 as a duet between him and Kenny Chesney. An uncredited review of the album in Billboard called the project "entertainingly quirky". George Hauenstein of Country Standard Time spoke favorably of the variety of songwriters, which included Jim Lauderdale, Dennis Linde, and Hanna's wife, Matraca Berg. He also wrote that "record label trouble" had kept them from being more successful in the 1990s.

=== 21st century: Will the Circle Be Unbroken, Volume III, membership changes, and farewell tour ===
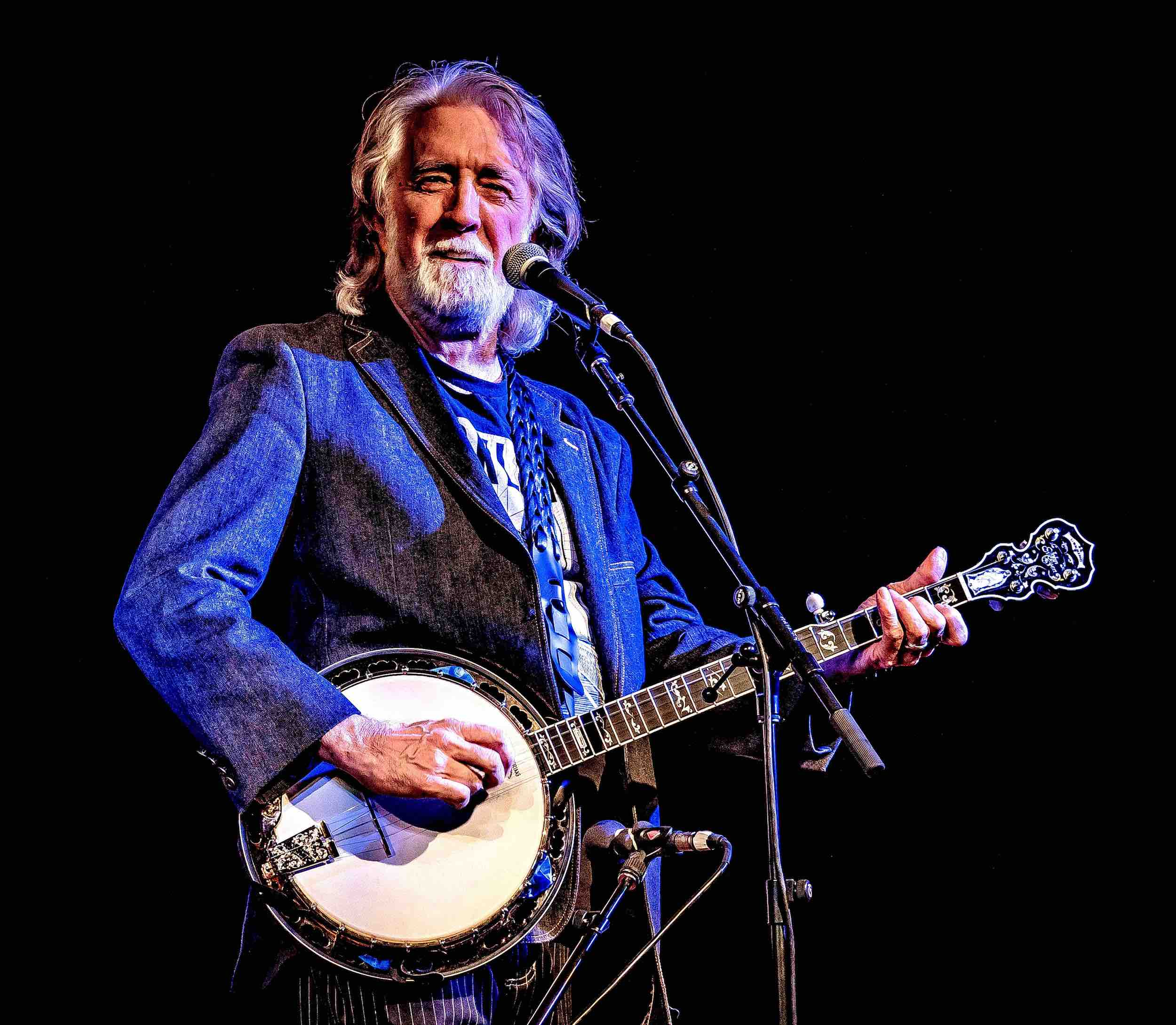
John McEuen was a longtime member of Nitty Gritty Dirt Band.

McEuen rejoined the band in 2001, shortly before the release of their third collaborative album, Will the Circle Be Unbroken, Volume III, in 2002. This album featured further guests such as Dwight Yoakam, Tom Petty, and Iris DeMent. Collaborators from the previous Will the Circle Be Unbroken albums returned, as well, such as Doc Watson and Johnny Cash. Robert L. Doerschuk of AllMusic thought the album felt less collaborative than the previous two, due to a lack of chemistry between certain performers. Corresponding with both this album's release and the 30th anniversary of the first Will the Circle Be Unbroken album, they joined Earl and Randy Scruggs, Vassar Clements, and Jerry Douglas for a live concert aired on PBS and titled Will the Circle Be Unbroken: Farther Along. All of the artists performed a live rendition of "Earl's Breakdown". This rendition accounted for Nitty Gritty Dirt Band's third Grammy Award win, in the category of Best Country Instrumental Performance.

Next in 2004 was Welcome to Woody Creek on Dualtone Records. This album was recorded at a studio owned by Ibbotson in Woody Creek, Colorado. Dan MacIntosh of Country Standard Time wrote, "Such an idyllic setting may well have inspired the warmth and friendliness of this bluegrass-tinged album." Ibbotson left the band just before 2009's Speed of Life, a self-released project. George Massenburg and Jon Randall produced the album. In Ibbotson's absence, session musician Glenn Worf played bass, while Randall and Berg were among the backing vocalists. A review for Country Standard Time said of this album that it "isn't breaking much new ground, but it sounds like an album the boys in the band had a lot of fun making, and that fun translates well to the listening."

To honor their 50th anniversary, the band played a special concert at the Ryman Auditorium in Nashville. The concert was also released as a live album and DVD titled Circlin' Back: Celebrating 50 Years. It included guests John Prine, Sam Bush, Vince Gill, Jerry Jeff Walker, Alison Krauss, Rodney Crowell, Byron House, Jerry Douglas, and Jackson Browne, in addition to former member Ibbotson. The special also aired on PBS and was later packaged as a live CD and DVD titled Circlin' Back: Celebrating 50 Years in 2016. A Los Angeles Times review stated that the original release "helped knock down barriers then separating the traditional country and rock music communities, setting the stage for the eventual emergence of what came to be known as Americana music".

Following the end of their anniversary tour in 2017, McEuen exited again, citing creative differences. This left just Hanna, Carpenter, and Fadden as members. In response to this, they hired three new members in 2018: Ross Holmes on fiddle and mandolin, Jeff Hanna's son Jaime Hanna on guitar, and Jim Photoglo on bass guitar. Prior to joining the band, Jaime Hanna had been a touring guitarist for the Mavericks; he also performed with John McEuen's son Jonathan in the duo Hanna-McEuen, and later as a member of Gary Allan's road band. Holmes had previously been a touring musician for Mumford & Sons. Photoglo had been a friend of the members for several years prior, and wrote "Fishin' in the Dark" almost 30 years before he joined. With this lineup in place, the band recorded a Bob Dylan covers album, Dirt Does Dylan, in 2022 with Ray Kennedy as producer. The first single was a cover of "The Times They Are a-Changin'", featuring guest vocals from the War and Treaty, Rosanne Cash, Jason Isbell, and Steve Earle. All proceeds from this version were donated to Feeding America. Larkin Poe also joined the band on a cover of "I Shall Be Released". Hanna told Billboard he wanted to release a Dylan cover album for many years due to his being a longtime fan of Dylan's music. Dan McIntosh of Country Standard Time noted that while the project mostly contained "familiar tunes", he considered the arrangements indicative of Dylan's influence on country.

In January 2024, Nitty Gritty Dirt Band began their farewell tour For the Good Times, starting with a concert in Bowling Green, Kentucky, and lasting throughout 2024. Several stops on the tour included Isbell as an opening act.

== Musical styles ==
Nitty Gritty Dirt Band's music encompasses a wide variety of styles. Colin Larkin, in The Virgin Encyclopedia of Country Music, wrote that their early albums contained jug band and Vaudeville influences, while by the release of Uncle Charlie and His Dog Teddy, they "abandoned the jokey elements...[and] pursued a career as purveyors of superior country rock." AllMusic's Mark Deming spoke similarly of their early material, noting influences of bluegrass in the "Mr. Bojangles" cover as well as the tracks from the first Will the Circle Be Unbroken album. He also defined the band's late-1970s output as soft rock, and that their 1990s and 21st-century material was indebted to American folk music. On the same site, Stephen Thomas Erlewine also noticed influences of soft rock on The Dirt Band. Rickey Ferguson wrote the country influences were more evident on Plain Dirt Fashion due to the use of instruments such as fiddle and mandolin. Holly Gleason noted the twang evident in Hanna's and Ibbotson's singing voices, and thought the rhythm sections were stronger than usual for a country band.

During the release of Will the Circle Be Unbroken, the members were noted for their long-haired appearance, which was considered counter to the appearances of country music acts at the time. Bill Monroe was said to have refused an offer to appear on the album, and Roy Acuff was initially apprehensive before joining. The band said that an impetus behind their shift to country music in the 1980s was the lack of a successful pop song after "An American Dream" and "Make a Little Magic", followed by a realization that members of the country music community in Nashville were still fans of their music. They also thought that the first two Will the Circle Be Unbroken projects helped to "dim the lines" between pop and country, especially since the genre of country rock was still new when the first one was recorded. Walter Tunis of the Lexington Herald-Leader thought that of them as an early example of the California-based country rock movement of the 1970s furthered by bands such as the Flying Burrito Brothers and Eagles, and that such a comparison was furthered when Leadon, a former member of both bands, joined. He also thought that their success in country in the 1980s was more indebted to marketing and changes in taste from listeners more so than a shift in sound within the band itself. Leadon also stated that he heard influences of the Eagles within the Nitty Gritty Dirt Band's songs. Jim Wensits of The South Bend Tribune described them as a "coming force in country rock" during the success of "Mr. Bojangles", and added that they "confounded critics by refusing to be categorized." He also thought that the band's sound during the 1970s was comparable to the Eagles, and that some songs such as their cover of "Jambalaya" featured influences of Cajun music.

In a 2022 concert review, Jeffrey B. Remz of Country Standard Time opined that Jeff Hanna's "voice was well intact at 75" and that he had "an affable, easy-going stage presence." He also noted that Jaime Hanna, Carpenter, and Fadden occasionally sang lead vocals, as well. He also praised the use of fiddle and mandolin in their live settings.

== Members ==
Current members

- Jeff Hanna – guitar, vocals (1966–present)
- Jimmie Fadden – drums, guitar, harmonica, vocals (1966–present)
- Bob Carpenter – keyboards, accordion, vocals (1979–present)
- Jim Photoglo – bass guitar, vocals (2018–present)
- Jaime Hanna – guitar, vocals (2018–present)
- Ross Holmes – fiddle, mandolin, vocals (2018–present)

Former members

- John McEuen – guitar, banjo, vocals, mandolin, fiddle (1966–1988, 2001–2017)
- Les Thompson – guitar, bass, mandolin (1966–1974)
- Ralph Barr – guitar, clarinet (1966–1969)
- Jackson Browne – vocals, guitar (1966)
- Bruce Kunkel – vocals, guitar (ca. 1966–1967)
- Chris Darrow – vocals, guitar (ca. 1967–1969)
- Jimmy Ibbotson – bass guitar, accordion, keyboards, drums, vocals (1970–1976, 1983–2009)
- John Cable – guitar, bass guitar (ca. 1976–1978)
- Jackie Clark – guitar, bass guitar (ca. 1976–1978)
- Merel Bergante – drums (ca. 1978–1979)
- Michael Buono – drums (ca. 1979)
- Al Garth – saxophone, fiddle, guitar, keyboards, vocals (ca. 1978–1983)
- Richard Hathaway – bass guitar (ca. 1978–1983)
- Vic Mastrionni – drums (ca. 1980–1983)
- Bernie Leadon – vocals, guitar, banjo (1988–1989)

== Discography ==
- The Nitty Gritty Dirt Band (1967)
- Ricochet (1967)
- Rare Junk (1968)
- Uncle Charlie & His Dog Teddy (1970)
- All the Good Times (1972)
- Will the Circle Be Unbroken (1972)
- Stars & Stripes Forever (1974)
- Symphonion Dream (1975)
- The Dirt Band (1978)
- An American Dream (1979)
- Make a Little Magic (1980)
- Jealousy (1981)
- Let's Go (1983)
- Plain Dirt Fashion (1984)
- Partners, Brothers and Friends (1985)
- Hold On (1987)
- Workin' Band (1988)
- Will the Circle Be Unbroken: Volume Two (1989)
- The Rest of the Dream (1990)
- Not Fade Away (1992)
- Acoustic (1994)
- The Christmas Album (1997)
- Bang, Bang, Bang (1999)
- Will the Circle Be Unbroken, Volume III (2002)
- Welcome to Woody Creek (2004)
- Speed of Life (2009)
- Dirt Does Dylan (2022)

== Works cited ==
- McEuen, John (2017). The Life I've Picked: A Banjo Player's Nitty Gritty Journey. Chicago Review Press. ISBN 978-1613738955.
- Roland, Tom (1991). The Billboard Book of Number One Country Hits. Billboard Books. ISBN 0-8230-7553-2.
- Whitburn, Joel (2017). Hot Country Songs 1944 to 2017. Record Research, Inc. ISBN 978-0-89820-229-8.
