= Make a Little Magic =

Studio album by The Dirt Band
- Released: 1980
- Genre: Country; country rock; pop; folk rock; bluegrass
- Length: 34:18
- Label: United Artists
- Producer: Jeff Hanna, Bob Edwards

The Dirt Band chronology
| An American Dream (1979) | Make a Little Magic (1980) | Jealousy (1981) |

Professional ratings
Review scores
| Source | Rating |
|---|---|
| AllMusic | 2/5 stars |

Make a Little Magic is the twelfth album by the Dirt Band, formerly known as the Nitty Gritty Dirt Band. This album includes the title cut which reached number 77 on the Billboard Hot Country Singles & Tracks chart but peaked at number 25 on the U.S. Billboard Hot 100 with Nicolette Larson singing backup. The album reached number 62 on the US Billboard 200 chart. It also includes their cover version of the Cindy Bullens tune, "Anxious Heart".

== Track listing ==
1. "Make a Little Magic" (Hanna, Hathaway, Carpenter) – 3:55
2. "Badlands" (Hathaway, Carpenter, Hanna) – 4:14
3. "High School Yearbook" (Hanna, Hathaway, Carpenter) – 2:44
4. "Leigh Anne" (Holster) – 4:10
5. "Riding Alone" (Hathaway, Carpenter, Hanna) – 2:20
6. "Anxious Heart" (Bullens, Veitch) – 2:43
7. "Do It! (Party Lights)" (Fadden, Carpenter, Hathaway, Hanna) – 4:24
8. "Harmony" (Hanna, Fadden) – 4:22
9. "Too Good to Be True" (Carpenter, Hanna) – 3:38
10. "Mullen's Farewell to America" (McEuen, Garth) – 1:48

== Personnel ==
- Jeff Hanna – lead and backing vocals, rhythm and lead guitars
- Jimmie Fadden – electric and acoustic harmonica
- Al Garth – alto and tenor saxophones, viola
- John McEuen – lap steel guitar, mandolin; acoustic guitar on "Mullen's Farwell to America"
- Bob Carpenter – keyboards, backing vocals; lead vocals on "Leigh Ann" and "Harmony"
- Richard Hathaway – bass, backing vocals

Additional Musicians

- Rick Shlosser – drums, percussion
- Nicolette Larson – backing and harmony vocals on "Make A Little Magic", "Do It" and "Harmony"
- Haden Gregg – backing vocals on "Anxious Heart" and "Badlands"
- Geoffrey Morris – slide guitar on "Too Good To Be True"

Production

- Producer – Jeff Hanna and Bob Edwards

== Chart performance ==
| Chart (1980) | Peak position |
|---|---|
| US Billboard 200 | 62 |
| Canadian RPM Country Albums | 12 |
| Canadian RPM Top Albums | 64 |
