= Bang Bang Bang (Nitty Gritty Dirt Band album) =

Studio album by Nitty Gritty Dirt Band
- Released: 1999
- Genre: Country, country rock, folk rock, bluegrass
- Length: 36:39
- Label: DreamWorks
- Producer: Emory Gordy, Jr., Steve Fishell, Josh Leo

Nitty Gritty Dirt Band chronology
The Christmas Album (1997)	Bang Bang Bang (1999)	Will the Circle Be Unbroken, Volume III (2004)

Professional ratings
Review scores
Source	Rating
AllMusic	3/5 stars

Bang Bang Bang is the 1999 album from the Nitty Gritty Dirt Band. The title track reached number 52 on the US Country chart. The track "Down the Road" was originally recorded by Mac McAnally, and would later be a No. 1 in 2008 when he re-recorded it with Kenny Chesney.

The album was originally recorded for Rising Tide Records, which closed prior to the album's release. It was then moved to Decca Records, which also closed. The lead single, which was the title track, originally charted through release on Rising Tide, and charted again after DreamWorks released the album.

== Critical reception ==
A review in Billboard was favorable, calling the songs "entertainingly quirky" and praising the musicianship.

== Track listing ==
No.	Title	Writer(s)	Length
1.	"If This Ain't Love"	Jim Lauderdale, Gary Nicholson	2:57
2.	"Bang Bang Bang"	Al Anderson, Craig Wiseman	3:42
3.	"Singing to the Scarecrow"	Dennis Linde	4:30
4.	"Forget the Job (Get a Life)"	Steve Bogard, Rick Giles	3:04
5.	"It's About Time"	John Bunzow	3:59
6.	"Down the Road"	Mac McAnally	2:38
7.	"Nickel in the Well"	Lonnie Wilson, Chris Waters	3:23
8.	"Rent, Groceries and Gasoline"	John Bunzow, Harry Stinson	3:31
9.	"Dry Town"	Gillian Welch, David Rawlings	2:45
10.	"The Monkey Song"	Jimmy Ibbotson	2:32
11.	"Southbound Train"	Dennis Linde	3:38
Total length:			36:39

== Personnel ==
- Jeff Hanna – vocals, electric and acoustic guitars, slide guitar, 12 string guitar, washboard
- Jimmy Ibbotson – vocals, acoustic and electric guitar, mandolin
- Jimmie Fadden – drums, harmonica
- Bob Carpenter – vocals, piano, Hammond B-3, accordion
