= Acoustic (Nitty Gritty Dirt Band album) =

Studio album by Nitty Gritty Dirt Band
- Released: 1994
- Genre: Country, country rock, folk rock, bluegrass
- Length: 38:04
- Label: Liberty
- Producer: Nitty Gritty Dirt Band

Nitty Gritty Dirt Band chronology
Not Fade Away (1990)	Acoustic (1994)	The Christmas Album (1997)

Acoustic is the 1994 album by Nitty Gritty Dirt Band.

The song "Sara In The Summer" was originally released as "Sara" on Jimmy Ibbotson's first solo album Nitty Gritty Ibbotson in 1977. The Wild Jimbos also included it on their 1991 debut album Wild Jimbos.

== Reception ==
The AllMusic review by Jim Newsom awarded the album 4 stars and said:

A couple of years after the Nitty Gritty Dirt Band's string of country hits ended, the band returned to its roots to record this appropriately titled collection of original material. Most of the songs are very good, and the sound is refreshingly unadorned with any concessions to the soundalike country mainstream. Because the NGDB was among the many fine artists swept aside by the faceless hat acts and young country babes birthed by the Garth era, Acoustic never found a sizable audience. However, this blend of acoustic guitars, mandolin, resonator guitar, harmonica, accordion, washboard, and beautiful vocal harmonies delivers a bevy of country/folk delights.

Professional ratings
Review scores
Source	Rating
Allmusic	4/5 stars

== Track listing ==
1. "How Long?" (Jimmy Ibbotson) – 2:54
2. "Cupid's Got A Gun" (Jimmie Fadden, LeRoy Preston) – 3:41
3. "Sarah In The Summer" (Ibbotson) – 3:18
4. "Let It Roll" (Jeff Hanna, Bob Carpenter, Tom Kell) – 4:05
5. "Hello, I Am Your Heart" (Dennis Linde) – 3:05
6. "Love Will Find A Way" (Carpenter, Kell) – 2:42
7. "Tryin' Times" (Fadden, Alex Harvey) – 3:34
8. "This Train Keeps Rolling Along" (Jim Photoglo, Vince Melamed, Ibbotson) – 4:28
9. "Badlands" (Carpenter, Hanna, Fadden, Richard Hathaway) – 3:31
10. "One Sure Honest Line" (Ibbotson) – 2:56
11. "Bless the Broken Road" (Hanna, Marcus Hummon, Bobby Boyd) – 3:50

== Personnel ==
- Jeff Hanna – guitars, washboard, lead and background vocals
- Jimmie Fadden – drums, harmonica, background vocals, lead vocal on "Cupid's Got A Gun"
- Jimmy Ibbotson – bass, guitar, mandolin, lead and background vocals
- Bob Carpenter – keyboards, accordion, bass, harmony vocals, lead vocal on "Broken Road"

== See also ==
- Nitty Gritty Dirt Band discography
