= Jealousy (Dirt Band album) =

Studio album by Nitty Gritty Dirt Band
- Released: 1981
- Genre: Country; country rock; folk rock; bluegrass
- Label: Liberty
- Producer: Jeff Hanna, Bob Edwards

Nitty Gritty Dirt Band chronology
Make a Little Magic (1980)	Jealousy (1981)	Let's Go (1983)

Professional ratings
Review scores
Source	Rating
Allmusic	2/5 stars

Jealousy is an album released in 1981 by the Dirt Band (a.k.a. Nitty Gritty Dirt Band). It reached #102 on the US album charts. The single "Fire in the Sky" reached #76 on the US singles chart.

== Track listing ==
1. "Jealousy" (Holster, Hanna, Carpenter) – 3:38
2. "Too Close For Comfort" (Hanna, Hathaway, Carpenter) – 3:05
3. "Fire in the Sky" (Carpenter, Hanna) – 4:37
4. "Love is the Last Thing" (Hanna, Hathaway, Carpenter) – 3:42
5. "Crossfire" (Hanna, Carpenter) – 4:02
6. "Circular Man" (Fadden, Carpenter, Hanna) – 3:46
7. "Catch the Next Dream" (Silbar, Lorber, Van Stephenson) – 3:22
8. "So You Run" (Holster, Carpenter) – 3:18
9. "Forget It!" (Hathaway, Hanna, Carpenter) – 3:09
10. "Easy Slow" (Hathaway, Hanna, Carpenter) – 4:26

== Personnel ==
- Jeff Hanna – rhythm and lead guitar, vocals
- Jimmie Fadden – harmonica, vocals
- John McEuen – acoustic guitar, electric 12-string guitar, lap steel guitar, 5-string banjo
- Bob Carpenter – keyboards, rhythm guitar on "Crossfire", vocals
- Richard Hathaway – bass guitar
- Al Garth – saxophone, violin

Additional musicians

- Rick Shlosser – drums
- M. L. Benoit – congas, percussion
- Steve Lukather – lead guitar on "Jealousy"
- John Macy – pedal steel guitar
- Bryan Savage – additional saxophone on "Fire in the Sky"

Background vocals

- Kenny Loggins
- Rosemary Butler
- David Holster
- The "Goodbye" Girls – Karen and Lisa

== Production ==
- Producer – Jeff Hanna and Bob Edwards

== Track personnel ==
- "Jealousy" – lead vocals: Jeff Hanna, harmony vocals: Rosemary Butler, lead electric guitar: Steve Lukather (Toto)
- "Too Close For Comfort" – lead vocals: Jeff Hanna, harmony vocals: Bob Carpenter, Jeff Hanna
- "Fire in the Sky" – lead vocals: Jeff Hanna with Kenny Loggins
- "Love is the Last Thing" – lead vocals: Bob Carpenter, harmony vocals: Jeff Hanna
- "Crossfire" – lead vocals: Jeff Hanna, background vocals: Bob Carpenter, David Holster
- "Circular Man" – lead vocals: Jeff Hanna, harmony vocals: Bob Carpenter
- "Catch the Next Dream" – lead vocals: Jeff Hanna, harmony vocals: Bob Carpenter
- "So You Run" – lead vocals: Jimmie Fadden, background vocals: Jeff Hanna, Bob Carpenter, David Holster
- "Forget It!" – lead vocals: Jeff Hanna, featuring: the Doowrats and the "Goodbye" Girls
- "Easy Slow" – lead vocals: Bob Carpenter, background vocals: Jeff Hanna, Bob Carpenter

== Discography ==
- Nitty Gritty Dirt Band discography
