= Dance Little Jean =

Single by Nitty Gritty Dirt Band

from the album Let's Go
- B-side: "Maryann"
- Released: October 1, 1983
- Genre: Country
- Length: 3:12
- Label: Warner Bros. Nashville
- Songwriter: Jimmy Ibbotson
- Producer: Norbert Putnam

Nitty Gritty Dirt Band singles chronology
"Shot Full of Love" (1983)	"Dance Little Jean" (1983)	"Long Hard Road (The Sharecropper's Dream)" (1984)

"Dance Little Jean" is a song written by Jimmy Ibbotson, and recorded by American country music group Nitty Gritty Dirt Band. It was released in October 1983 as the second single from the album Let's Go. The song reached number 9 on the Billboard Hot Country Singles & Tracks chart.

== Background and writing ==
Jimmy Ibbotson wrote the song hoping the charm and romance of the story would convince his ex-wife that they should get back together. Little Jean was named for his real life daughter who would always dance when he played guitar. When he played it for his ex-wife for the first time, Little Jean danced, but his ex-wife's response was not what he had hoped for. She told him he would be able to afford child support now, because that song would be a hit.

== Content ==
The song is about a musician disillusioned about marriage, whose heart is softened by a daughter dancing to his band at her parents' wedding reception whilst wearing crinolines and a calico skirt.

== Chart performance ==
Chart (1983)	Peak position
US Hot Country Songs (Billboard)	9
Canadian RPM Country Tracks	39
