= Not Fade Away (Nitty Gritty Dirt Band album) =

Studio album by Nitty Gritty Dirt Band
- Released: 1992
- Genre: Country; Country rock Folk rock Bluegrass
- Label: Liberty
- Producer: Jimmy Bowen; Chuck Howard

Nitty Gritty Dirt Band chronology
Live Two Five (1991)	Not Fade Away (1992)	Acoustic (1994)

Professional ratings
Review scores
Source	Rating
Allmusic	2/5 stars

Not Fade Away is a 1992 album by the Nitty Gritty Dirt Band. Two singles from the album charted: a cover of "I Fought the Law" reached 66 on the US Country charts, and "One Good Love" reached 74 on the US Country charts.

Suzy Bogguss appears as guest vocalist on "Don't Underestimate Love". The Nitty Gritty Dirt Band also appeared on her 1992 album Voices in the Wind.

This album should not be confused with Not Fade Away (Remembering Buddy Holly), a Buddy Holly tribute album that included one track by the Nitty Gritty Dirt Band.

== Track listing ==
1. "Not Fade Away" (Charles Hardin, Norman Petty) – 2:52
2. "Little Angel" (Matraca Berg, Jeff Hanna) – 3:52
3. "Mama Tried" (Merle Haggard) – 2:52
4. "One Good Love" (Radney Foster, Jeff Hanna) – 3:47
5. "Losin' You" (Bob Carpenter, Tom Kell) – 4:20
6. "I Fought the Law" (Sonny Curtis) – 2:19
7. "Mother of the Bride" (Jimmy Ibbotson) – 3:46
8. "Don't Underestimate Love" (Matraca Berg, Jeff Hanna) – 3:47
9. "What'll You Do About Me" (Dennis Linde) – 2:40
10. "The Dream" (Jimmie Fadden, Bernie Nelson) – 4:06

== Personnel ==
- Bob Carpenter – keyboards, bass, vocals
- Jimmie Fadden – drums, harmonica
- Jeff Hanna – electric and acoustic guitar, vocals
- Jimmy Ibbotson – electric and acoustic guitar, mandolin, bass, vocals
- Suzy Bogguss – guest vocalist on "'Don't Underestimate Love"
