= Uncle Charlie & His Dog Teddy =

Studio album by Nitty Gritty Dirt Band
- Released: February 1970
- Recorded: 1969
- Genre: Country, country rock, folk rock, bluegrass
- Length: 45:16
- Label: Liberty
- Producer: William E. McEuen

Nitty Gritty Dirt Band chronology
| Alive (1969) | Uncle Charlie & His Dog Teddy (1970) | All the Good Times (1971) |

Singles from Uncle Charlie & His Dog Teddy
- 1. "Mr. Bojangles" Released: September 1970; 2. "House at Pooh Corner" Released: April 12, 1971

Professional ratings
Review scores
| Source | Rating |
|---|---|
| Allmusic | 4/5 stars |
| Rolling Stone | (mixed) |

Uncle Charlie & His Dog Teddy is the fourth studio album from The Nitty Gritty Dirt Band, released in 1970, including the hit song "Mr. Bojangles". The album reached No. 66 on US charts. Three singles charted: "Mr. Bojangles" reached No. 9, "House at Pooh Corner" reached No. 53, and "Some Of Shelly's Blues" reached No. 64. In Canada, the singles reached No. 2, No. 30, and No. 56.

The 1994 CD version has the title Uncle Charlie And His Dog on the spine.

== Songs ==
"Some of Shelly's Blues" and "Propinquity" were written by Michael Nesmith, best known as a member of The Monkees.

"Travelin' Mood" was written and first recorded by R&B artist James "We Willie" Waynes in 1955.

"Clinch Mountain Backstep" is credited to Ruby Rakes, who is the half-sister of The Stanley Brothers. She was assigned the rights to many of their songs for financial reasons.

"Jesse James" is a 1963 recording of Uncle Charlie, who was a relative of Bill McEuen's wife. The "Uncle Charlie Interview" is from the same 1963 recording. This leads directly into Mr. Bojangles, associating the real man with the song character.

"Mr. Bojangles" was written and recorded by Jerry Jeff Walker. Hanna heard the song on the radio one night and mentioned it to Jimmy Ibbotson. Ibbotson knew the song and actually had been carrying the single (a gift) around in his trunk for months. They cleaned it off and transcribed the song as best they could. Engineer Craymore Stevens wrote down the lyrics; however, he got a few words wrong and they made the final recording. This story is told in more colorful detail on the 2003 CD reissue.

"Opus 36" was written by English composer Muzio Clementi in 1797. Its full title is "Sonatina in C major, op.36, no.1". It was arranged and adapted by Walter McEuen.

== Track listing ==
Side 1

1. "Some of Shelly's Blues" (Michael Nesmith) – 2:51
2. "Prodigal's Return" (Kenny Loggins, Dann Lottermoser) – 3:11
3. "The Cure" (Jeff Hanna) – 2:11
4. "Travelin' Mood" (James Waynes) – 2:39
5. "Chicken Reel" (Traditional) – 0:55
6. "Yukon Railroad" (Kenny Loggins, Dann Lottermoser) – 2:16
7. "Livin' Without You" (Randy Newman) – 2:00
8. "Clinch Mountain Backstep" (Ruby Rakes) – 2:31
9. "Rave On" (Norman Petty, Bill Tilghman, Sonny West) – 2:56
10. "Billy in the Low Ground" (Les Thompson) – 1:13

Side 2

1. "Jesse James" (Traditional) – 0:50
2. "Uncle Charlie Interview" (Uncle Charlie) – 1:38
3. "Mr. Bojangles" (Jerry Jeff Walker) – 3:37
4. "Opus 36, Clementi" (Muzio Clementi) – 1:42
5. "Santa Rosa" (Kenny Loggins) – 2:24
6. "Propinquity" (Michael Nesmith) – 2:20
7. "Uncle Charlie" (Jimmie Fadden) – 1:49
8. "Randy Lynn Rag" (Earl Scruggs) – 1:46
9. "House at Pooh Corner" (Kenny Loggins) – 2:39
10. "Swanee River" (Stephen Foster) – 0:36
11. "Uncle Charlie Interview #2 / Spanish Fandango" (Traditional) – 2:36

Extra tracks on the 2003 CD reissue:

1. "Mississippi Rain" (Lottermoser) – 3:06
2. "What Goes On" (John Lennon, Paul McCartney, Richard Starkey) – 2:12

== Charts ==
| Chart (1971) | Peak position |
|---|---|
| Australian (Kent Music Report) | 31 |
| Canada (RPM) | 56 |

== Production ==
- Producer – William McEuen
- Recording Engineer – Woody Woodward
- Mixing – John McEuen/Jimmy Hoyson
- Art Direction – Dean Torrence/Kittyhawk Graphics
- Photography – William McEuen

2003 CD reissue with two additional tracks and new liner notes

- Interview and liner notes – Robyn Flans
