= The Rest of the Dream =

Studio album by Nitty Gritty Dirt Band
- Released: 1990
- Genre: Country; Country rock; Folk rock; Bluegrass
- Label: MCA
- Producer: Randy Scruggs; Nitty Gritty Dirt Band

Nitty Gritty Dirt Band chronology
Will the Circle Be Unbroken: Volume Two (1989)	The Rest of the Dream (1990)	Live Two Five (1991)

The Rest of the Dream is an album by American country music band Nitty Gritty Dirt Band. It was released in 1990 through MCA Nashville Records. The album contains the singles "From Small Things (Big Things One Day Come)" and "You Make Life Good Again".

== Content ==
The song "Wishing Well" was the first song in the band's history written by every member. "From Small Things (Big Things One Day Come)", a cover of Bruce Springsteen, was issued in July 1990 as the project's first single. Both that song and "You Make Life Good Again" charted on Billboard Hot Country Songs upon release, although neither made top 40.

== Critical reception ==
Bruce Mason of The Province praised the use of mandolin in the production, as well as the inclusion of John Hiatt material.

== Track listing ==
1. "From Small Things (Big Things One Day Come)" (Bruce Springsteen) – 3:56
2. "Waiting on a Dark Eyed Girl'" (Ron Davies) – 4:16
3. "Junior's Grill" (Jim Photoglo, Vince Melamed, Jimmy Ibbotson) – 3:08
4. "Blow Out the Stars, Turn Off the Moon" (Bobby Braddock) – 3:52
5. "The Rest of the Dream" (John Hiatt) – 4:36
6. "Just Enough Ashland City" (Hiatt) – 3:56
7. "Hillbilly Hollywood" (Photoglo, Melamed) – 2:55
8. "Snowballs" (Bob Garshelis, Kim Tribble, Jimmie Fadden) – 4:07
9. "Wishing Well" (Jeff Hanna, Ibbotson, Fadden, Bob Carpenter) – 3:30
10. "You Made Life Good Again" (Bob DiPiero, Steve Seskin) – 3:00

== Personnel ==
The Band

- Jeff Hanna – lead, harmony and background vocals, electric lead and acoustic 6 & 12 string and national guitars, washboard
- Jimmy Ibbotson – lead and harmony vocals, mandolin, acoustic guitar
- Jimmie Fadden – drums, harmonica, jaw harp, background vocals
- Bob Carpenter – piano, harmony and background vocals, accordion, keyboards

Contributing Musicians

- Jerry Douglas – lap steel, dobro
- Paul Franklin – steel guitar
- Mike Henderson – electric slide guitar, electric guitar, big note tremolo guitar
- Josh Leo – electric guitar
- Randy Scruggs – electric guitar, acoustic guitar, Bill Lloyd's 12-string Rickenbacker, banjo
- Glenn Worf – bass, upright bass
- Jim Photoglo – background vocals
- Harry Stinson – background vocals
