= Virtual audience =

Videoconferencing-based audience in television programming

External videos
- Virtual audience during a Ellen DeGeneres Show, YouTube video

A virtual audience is the use of videoconferencing as a substitute for an in-person studio audience or spectators during a television program or sporting event. A virtual audience allows users to attend a television taping or other event virtually by viewing it via livestreaming, and having audio and video of themselves streamed via webcam to screens at the studio or event site.

The practice emerged during the COVID-19 pandemic, due to lockdowns and restrictions on gatherings preventing in-person attendance in the studio or venue.

== Implementation ==
Virtual audiences are often implemented using existing videoconferencing platforms such as Microsoft Teams or Zoom, or with proprietary platforms, such as one developed by technology company The Famous Group, and an internal system designed by the BBC.

Members of a virtual audience witness the event or the recording of a program via livestreaming. In turn, the audio and video feeds from their webcams can be aggregated by the production staff and incorporated into the program or event, such as the audio mix, and presenting the video from feeds inside the studio or venue as either a mosaic on video walls, or on individual screens.

== Notable examples ==
Virtual audiences became prominent on many non-scripted television programs after their return to production, including variety shows, reality competitions, game shows, and talk shows. A virtual audience used for the British variety and game show Ant & Dec's Saturday Night Takeaway was designed to allow for two-way interaction with the hosts and the show, handling up to 2,000 participants.

Some shows used a mixture of both in-person and virtual audiences; Let's Make a Deal maintained a smaller number of in-person audience members as contestants, but added a virtual audience whose members could also participate in the show. Similarly, The Ellen DeGeneres Show placed virtual audience members on individual screens replacing seats in its audience area, which were later mixed with limited in-person audience members. The Masked Singer used a mixture of stock footage and limited in-person audience members to preserve the illusion of a full audience, but did employ a virtual audience for a "fan vote" feature used as part of the judging process.

Virtual audiences were sometimes used during sports and sports-related events, particularly when they were held behind closed doors. During the 2020 NFL draft, a virtual "Inner Circle" of fans from each team was displayed on a television behind Commissioner Roger Goodell (who presented the draft as a virtual event from his home) during the first and second rounds; participants were chosen by each team, and video feeds from each fan were fed using a WebRTC client and a cloud server. The NBA Bubble featured virtual spectators displayed on screens along its courts, which were powered and sponsored by Microsoft Teams. Special guests such as NBA alumni were also present in the lobbies, with viewers given a chance to interact with them during the halftime break.

The professional wrestling promotion WWE introduced a closed studio known as the "ThunderDome", which featured a large-scale virtual audience displayed on multiple tiers of screens formed into a curved "grandstand". The ThunderDome stage was used at multiple venues in Florida, and replaced a smaller-scale studio at its WWE Performance Center training facility in Orlando. It was used for WWE's main weekly programs and almost all pay-per-view events from August 2020 through June 2021, before WWE returned to hosting in-person touring events. WWE's third brand, NXT, moved from Full Sail University to the Performance Center in October 2020, adopting a new stage design that similarly incorporated a virtual audience, along with limited in-person attendees. NXT would later reinstate a full-capacity studio audience in June 2021.

== Reception ==
The use of an audio-only virtual audience during the 74th British Academy Film Awards faced mixed reception; Deadline Hollywood noted that it "certainly added more atmosphere than BAFTA would've gotten from a silent Royal Albert Hall", but that some viewers and journalists questioned whether the show was actually using a canned laugh track and crowd noise.

Multiple writers have described virtual audiences as being dystopian; some writers drew comparisons to "Fifteen Million Merits"—a 2011 episode of the British sci-fi anthology Black Mirror where an in-universe talent show is depicted as having an audience of 3D avatars on a screen.

== See also ==
- Impact of the COVID-19 pandemic on television
- Impact of the COVID-19 pandemic on sports
