= Templeton, California =

Templeton
- Census-designated place
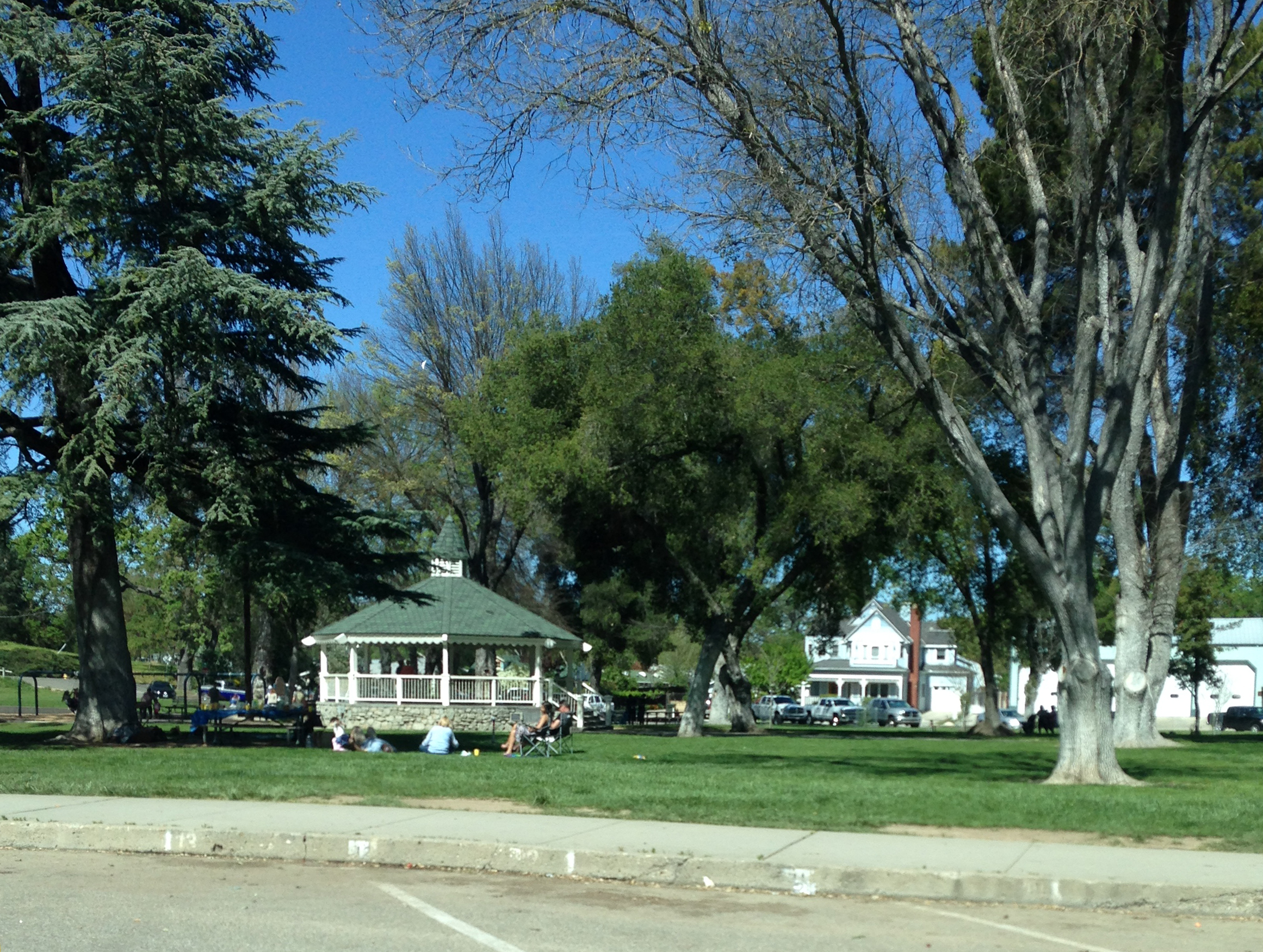
- Templeton Park

- Location in San Luis Obispo County and the state of California
- Coordinates: 35°33′14″N 120°42′34″W
- Country: United States
- State: California
- County: San Luis Obispo

Area
  - Total: 7.909 sq mi (20.485 km^{2})
  - Land: 7.909 sq mi (20.485 km^{2})
  - Water: 0 sq mi (0 km^{2}) 0%
- Elevation: 807 ft (246 m)

Population (2020)
  - Total: 8,386
  - Density: 1,060/sq mi (409.4/km^{2})
- Time zone: UTC-8 (Pacific (PST))
  - Summer (DST): UTC-7 (PDT)
- ZIP code: 93465
- Area code: 805
- FIPS code: 06-78162
- GNIS feature IDs: 1661557, 2410065

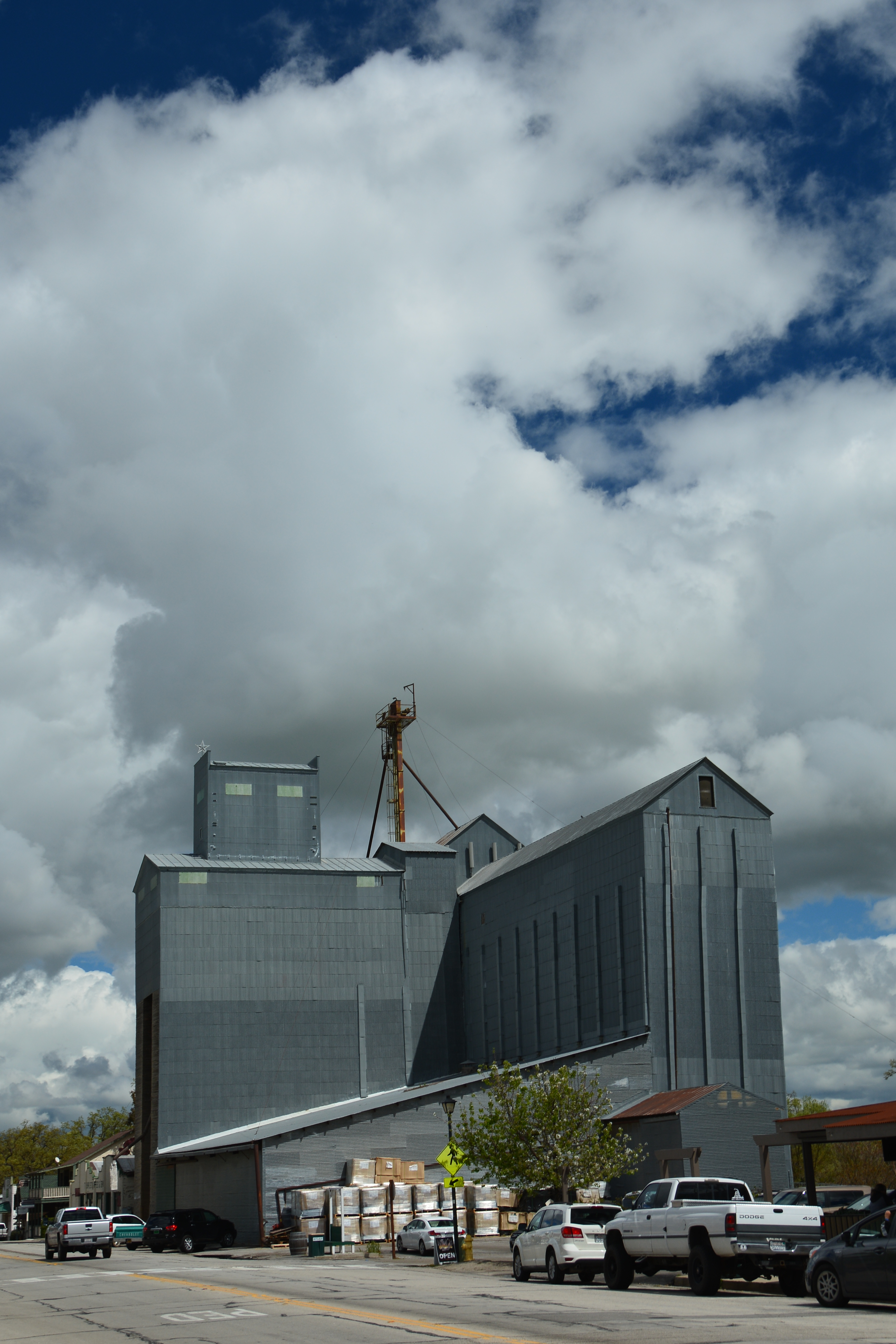
Feed and grain silo in downtown Templeton, 2017

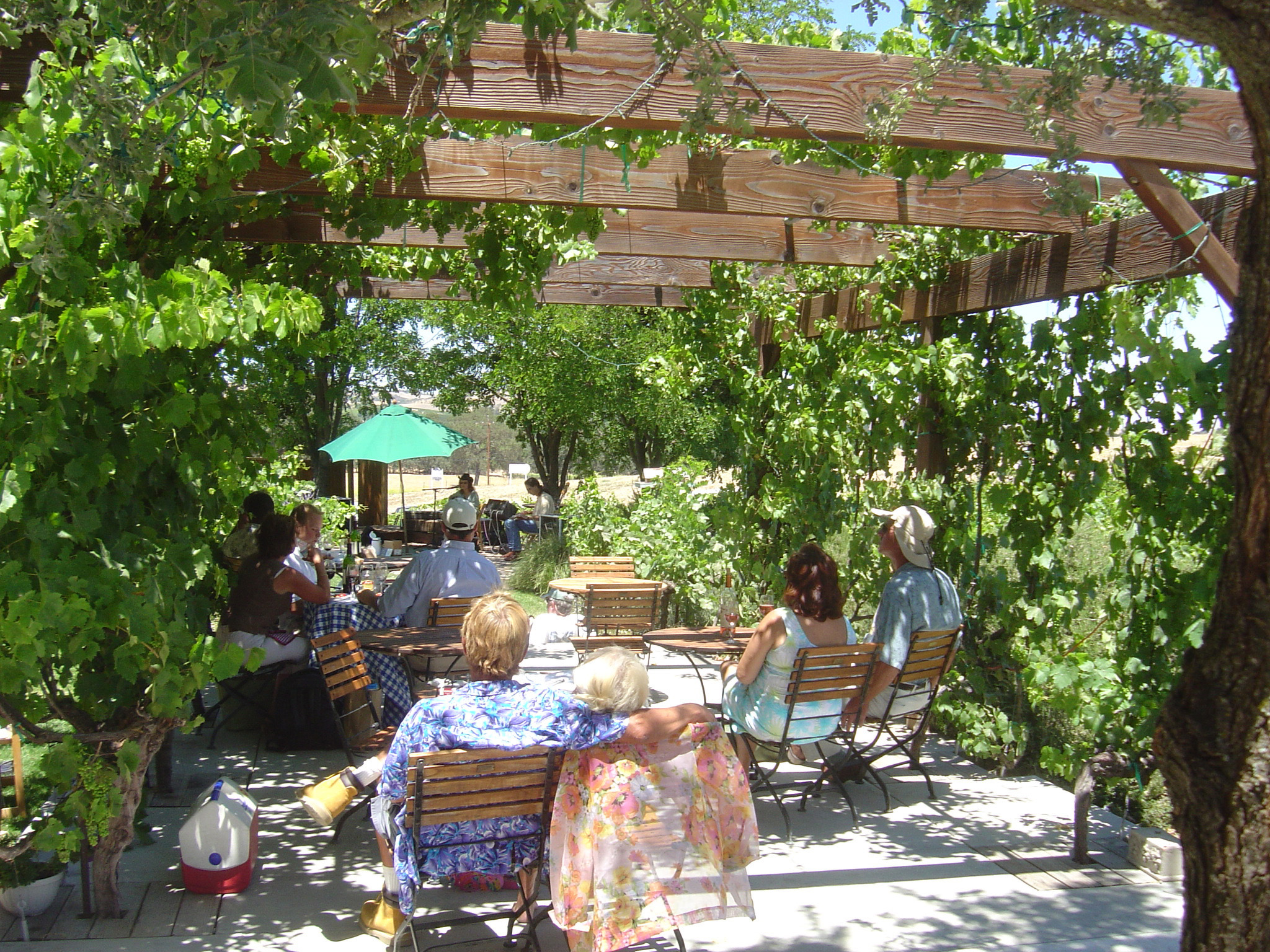
Castoro Cellars concert in Templeton

Templeton is a census-designated place (CDP) in San Luis Obispo County, California, United States. The population was 8,368 at the 2020 census, up from 7,674 at the 2010 census.

== Geography and climate ==
=== Geography ===
Templeton is located at 35°33′14″N 120°42′34″W (35.553847, −120.709469). It is approximately five miles (8 km) south of Paso Robles and five miles north of Atascadero along U.S. 101. State Route 46 intersects U.S. 101 on the northern edge of the town.

According to the United States Census Bureau, the CDP has a total area of 7.9 square miles (20 km^{2}), all land. However, much of the surrounding unincorporated area between Atascadero and Paso Robles is considered as part of Templeton, with most U.S. mail for this area addressed as such.

=== Climate ===
Templeton has a Mediterranean climate that is characterized by mild winters and dry summers. The area usually has low humidity. Rain generally falls only between November and March, with the rainy season tapering off almost completely by the end of April. Temperature lows can reach from 20 to 25 °F (−7 to −4 °C) in the winter, and highs can reach 100 °F (38 °C) in the summer, with the highest recorded temperature being 115 °F (46 °C).

Like much of the nearby area, Templeton occasionally receives significant but temporary fog through parts of the year. In summer, Templeton will occasionally receive fog due to its proximity with the California Coastal Range, Pacific Ocean, and the higher valley temperatures of Templeton itself; the differential in density between the warm rising air in the valley causes it to be displaced with the descent of the cooler marine air layer via the Templeton Gap in the Santa Lucia Range. Similarly, in winter, Templeton will occasionally receive morning fog due to the temperature differential with the Central Valley.

Although it is rare to see snow in Templeton, it did snow on December 15, 1988, leaving between 5 and 8 inches (13 and 20 cm) of total snowfall. It also most recently snowed in the winter of 2023.

== Demographics ==
=== 2023 estimates ===
In 2023, the US Census Bureau estimated that the median household income was $114,155, and the per capita income was $52,348. About 1.3% of families and 4.6% of the population were below the poverty line.

=== 2020 census ===
As of the 2020 census, Templeton had a population of 8,386. The population density was 1,060.3 inhabitants per square mile (409.4/km^{2}). The median age was 42.6 years. 24.4% of residents were under the age of 18 and 20.2% of residents were 65 years of age or older. For every 100 females there were 91.4 males, and for every 100 females age 18 and over there were 88.1 males age 18 and over.

The age distribution also included 6.4% aged 18 to 24, 22.1% aged 25 to 44, and 27.0% aged 45 to 64.

92.4% of residents lived in urban areas, while 7.6% lived in rural areas.

The census reported that 99.1% of the population lived in households and 0.9% were institutionalized.

There were 3,117 households in Templeton, of which 32.5% had children under the age of 18 living in them. Of all households, 56.0% were married-couple households, 5.0% were cohabiting couple households, 12.5% were households with a male householder and no spouse or partner present, and 26.5% were households with a female householder and no spouse or partner present. About 23.1% of all households were made up of individuals and 14.3% had someone living alone who was 65 years of age or older. The average household size was 2.67. There were 2,244 families (72.0% of all households).

There were 3,317 housing units at an average density of 419.4 units per square mile (161.9 units/km^{2}). Of these, 3,117 (94.0%) were occupied, 72.0% were owner-occupied, and 28.0% were occupied by renters. 6.0% of housing units were vacant. The homeowner vacancy rate was 1.7% and the rental vacancy rate was 3.4%.

Racial composition as of the 2020 census
Race	Number	Percent
White	6,325	75.4%
Black or African American	47	0.6%
American Indian and Alaska Native	110	1.3%
Asian	177	2.1%
Native Hawaiian and Other Pacific Islander	15	0.2%
Some other race	567	6.8%
Two or more races	1,145	13.7%
Hispanic or Latino (of any race)	1,755	20.9%

=== 2010 census ===
As of the 2010 census, Templeton had a population of 7,674. The population density was 988.1 inhabitants per square mile (381.5/km^{2}). The racial makeup of Templeton was 6,833 (89.0%) White, 59 (0.8%) African American, 80 (1.0%) Native American, 123 (1.6%) Asian, 10 (0.1%) Pacific Islander, 337 (4.4%) from other races, and 232 (3.0%) from two or more races. Hispanic or Latino of any race were 1,171 persons (15.3%).

The Census reported that 7,580 people (98.8% of the population) lived in households, 1 (0%) lived in non-institutionalized group quarters and 93 (1.2%) were institutionalized.

There were 2,830 households, of which 1,121 (39.6%) had children under the age of 18 living in them, 1,572 (55.5%) were opposite-sex married couples living together, 363 (12.8%) had a female householder with no husband present, 127 (4.5%) had a male householder with no wife present. There were 117 (4.1%) unmarried opposite-sex partnerships and 29 (1.0%) same-sex married couples or partnerships. 654 households (23.1%) were made up of individuals, and 352 (12.4%) had someone living alone who was 65 years of age or older. The average household size was 2.68. There were 2,062 families (72.9% of all households); the average family size was 3.14.

2,049 people (26.7%) of the population were under the age of 18, 598 people (7.8%) aged 18 to 24, 1,627 people (21.2%) aged 25 to 44, 2,288 people (29.8%) aged 45 to 64, and 1,112 people (14.5%) who were 65 years of age or older. The median age was 40.8 years. For every 100 females, there were 89.1 males. For every 100 females age 18 and over, there were 84.6 males.

There were 3,006 housing units at an average density of 387.1 per square mile (149.5/km^{2}), of which 2,002 (70.7%) were owner-occupied, and 828 (29.3%) were occupied by renters. The homeowner vacancy rate was 1.2%; the rental vacancy rate was 6.9%. 5,453 people (71.1% of the population) lived in owner-occupied housing units and 2,127 people (27.7%) lived in rental housing units.

== Economy ==
Templeton is home to numerous businesses that serve local agriculture and ranching, with the economy comprised most significantly from medical care including the Twin Cities Hospital, Templeton Unified School District, agriculture consisting primarily of vineyards and wineries, and assorted businesses on Main Street. Many residents work in nearby communities.

Templeton is emerging as a world class wine producer; with many of the wineries carrying the "Paso Robles" appellation actually located in the unincorporated Templeton area – including Castoro Cellars, Peachy Canyon, York Mountain, and Wild Horse.

There is a growing production of olive oil, with many small groves producing olives intended for consumption and oil, including Pasolivo.

== History ==
Templeton is located within the former Rancho Paso de Robles Mexican land grant and was founded in 1886 when Chauncey Hatch Phillips of the West Coast Land Company sent R.R. Harris to survey 160 acres (0.65 km^{2}) set aside for a town to exist south of Paso Robles as part of the company's larger purchase of 63,000 acres (250 km^{2}). These 160 acres were to be laid out in business and residential lots with 5–12 acre parcels, with the town to be named "Crocker" after a Vice President of the Southern Pacific Railroad, Charles F. Crocker; however, Crocker instead chose to name the town "Templeton," after his two-year-old son, Charles Templeton Crocker.

The town was briefly the end of the line for passengers travelling south via the Southern Pacific Railroad from northern California; passengers disembarked at Templeton and were then carried by stagecoach south to San Luis Obispo. In 1889, the railroad was continued 14 miles (23 km) south to Santa Margarita and the town was reclassified to a flag stop. Currently, the railroad stops in nearby Paso Robles before continuing on, and Templeton is classified as a bypass.

In 1898, a fire destroyed most of the original wooden buildings of the business district along Main Street, prompting this section of the town to be rebuilt with brick, although on a somewhat smaller scale than before.

In 2025, the historic grain silo of Templeton Feed and Grain burned down. It was a structure that had stood for over 100 years on the Main Street.

Four juvenile males from Northern San Luis Obispo County were identified in connection with the July 4, 2025, arson fire that destroyed the historic building. While all four teens were involved, investigators determined one of the teens was responsible for throwing the firework that ignited the blaze. Because they were juveniles at the time, none of their names were released to the public.

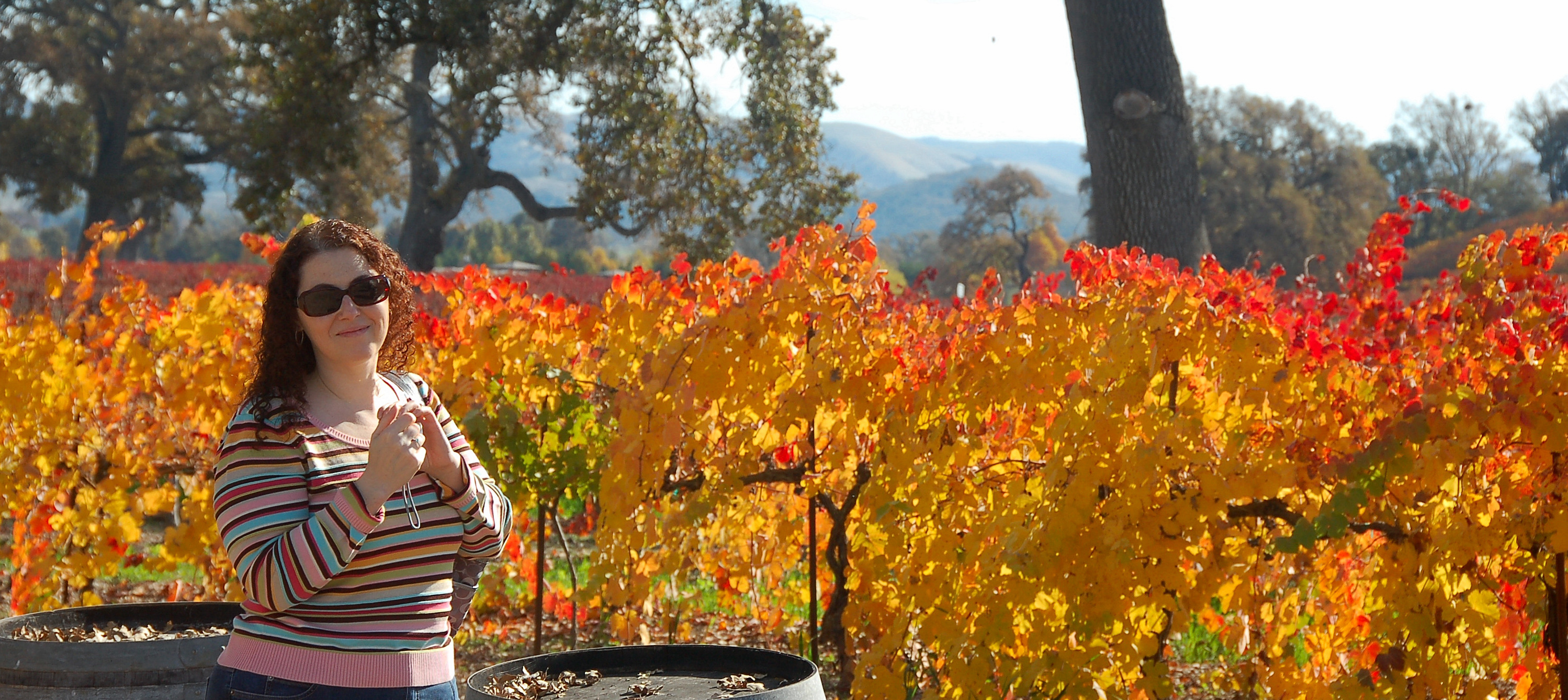
Fall colors in a Templeton vineyard

== Government ==
=== Local ===
Templeton is governed by the five-member board of the Templeton Community Services District.

The current board members are:

- President: Navid Fardanesh
- Vice President: Debra Logan
- Board members: Wayne Petersen, Chelsea Tirone, and Eric Mortensen

=== State and federal ===
In the state legislature, Templeton is in the 17th senatorial district, represented by Democrat John Laird, and in the 30th Assembly district, represented by Democrat Dawn Addis.

In the United States House of Representatives, Templeton is in California's 19th congressional district, represented by Democrat Jimmy Panetta.

== Schools ==
- Templeton High School - grades 9 to 12
- Templeton Middle School - grades 6 to 8
- Vineyard Elementary School - grades 3 to 5
- Templeton Elementary School - kindergarten to 2

Public schools in Templeton are located in and operated by the Templeton Unified School District, which notably includes Templeton High School, which was selected as a National Blue Ribbon High School in 2006, having previously been selected in both 1999 and 2005 as one of 64 schools out of 860 in the state of California as a California Distinguished School.

== Notable people ==
Hall-of-Famer Sandy Koufax

- Brian Barden, baseball player, born in Templeton
- Josh Brolin, actor, raised in Templeton
- Kurtis "Miss Fame" Dam-Mikkelsen, American drag queen, makeup artist, model, and recording artist
- Charles Douglass, inventor of the laugh track
- Stewart Finlay-McLennan, actor
- Tyler Gray, Miami Dolphins NFL linebacker
- Spencer Howard, MLB pitcher
- Sandy Koufax, Hall of Fame baseball player
- Elyse Pahler, teenaged murder victim
- Steve Webb, former mayor of Beverly Hills, California
