= Spencer Howard =

American baseball player (born 1996)

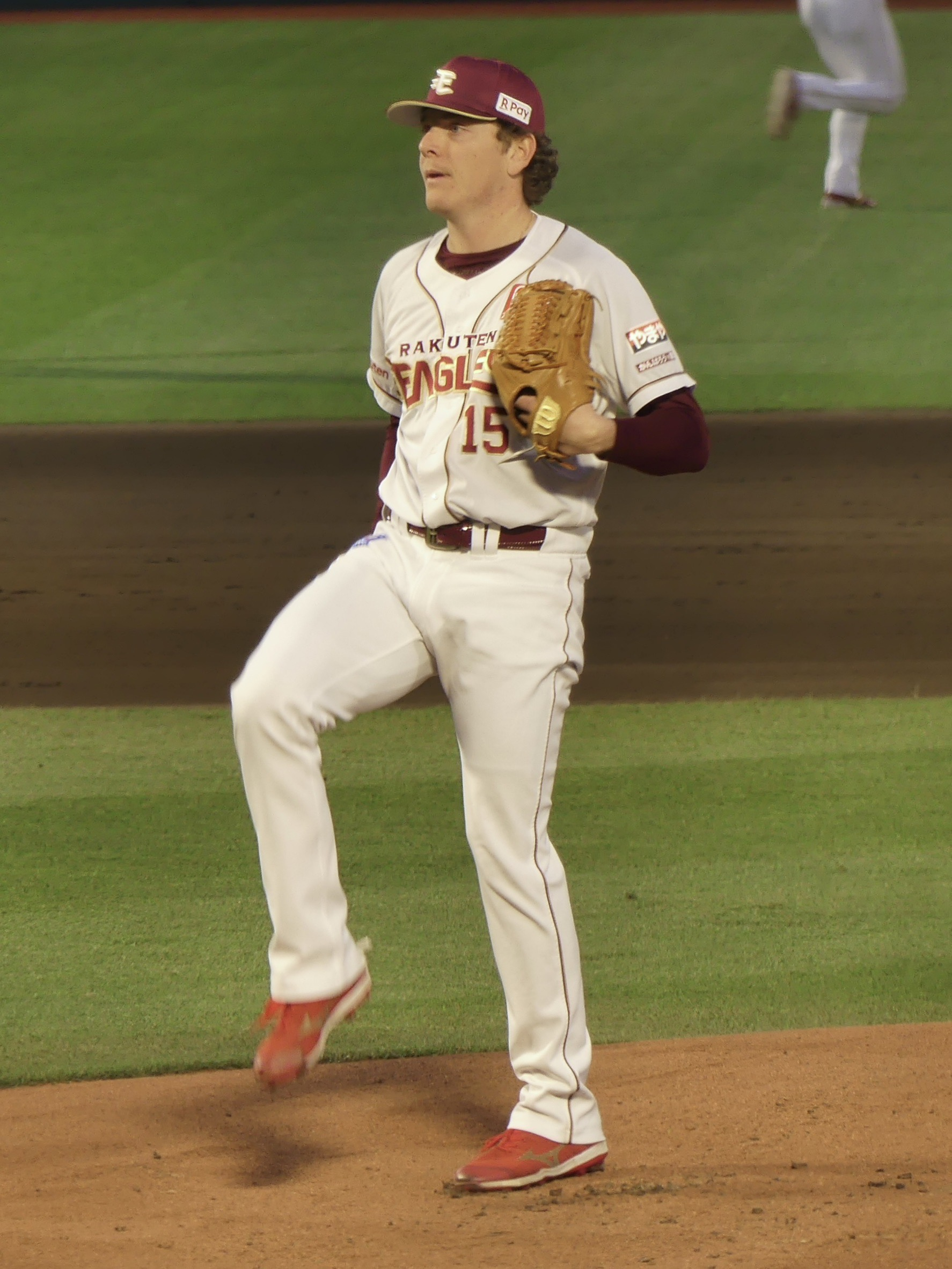
- Howard with the Tohoku Rakuten Golden Eagles in 2025

Yomiuri Giants – No. 28
- Pitcher
- Born: July 28, 1996 (age 30); San Luis Obispo, California, U.S.
- Bats: Right Throws: Right

Professional debut
- MLB: August 9, 2020, for the Philadelphia Phillies
- NPB: May 14, 2025, for the Tohoku Rakuten Golden Eagles

MLB statistics (through 2024 season)
- Win–loss record: 4–13
- Earned run average: 7.00
- Strikeouts: 136

NPB statistics (through August 18, 2026)
- Win–loss record: 7-3
- Earned run average: 1.96
- Strikeouts: 72
- Stats at Baseball Reference

Teams
- Philadelphia Phillies (2020–2021); Texas Rangers (2021–2023); San Francisco Giants (2024); Cleveland Guardians (2024); Tohoku Rakuten Golden Eagles (2025); Yomiuri Giants (2026–present)

Spencer Lee Howard (born July 28, 1996) is an American professional baseball pitcher for the Yomiuri Giants of Nippon Professional Baseball (NPB). He has previously played in Major League Baseball (MLB) for the Philadelphia Phillies, Texas Rangers, San Francisco Giants, and Cleveland Guardians, and in NPB for the Tohoku Rakuten Golden Eagles.

Born in San Luis Obispo and raised in Templeton, California, Howard played baseball and volleyball at Templeton High School. He received no scholarship offers to play college baseball but joined the Cal Poly Mustangs after a tryout camp. Originally a relief pitcher, he joined the starting rotation in 2017.

The Phillies selected Howard in the second round of the 2017 MLB draft, and he made his major league debut in 2020. He was traded to the Rangers the next year. Howard struggled with injury and stamina throughout his major league career, and by 2023, he was primarily a Triple-A player. In 2025, Howard left MLB and joined the Golden Eagles on a one-year contract.

== Early life ==
Spencer Lee Howard was born on July 28, 1996, in San Luis Obispo, California. He grew up in nearby Templeton, California, and was a multi-sport athlete at Templeton High School, playing baseball, volleyball, soccer, and Ultimate Frisbee. Baseball was not Howard's athletic priority; he almost quit the team during his junior year in order to pursue volleyball, and he did not play on private travel teams like many other high school baseball players seeking to break into professional leagues. After being persuaded by his coach to remain on the baseball team, Howard helped take Templeton to the Los Padres League championship as a junior in 2014. At Templeton, Howard served as both a pitcher and an outfielder. During his senior season, Howard posted a 7–3 win–loss record, with a 2.20 earned run average (ERA), and he struck out 87 batters in 66 2/3 innings pitched. As a hitter, he also maintained a .306 batting average. At the end of the year, he was named both the San Luis Obispo County Player of the Year and the Los Padres League Most Valuable Player.

== College career ==
Having not received any scholarship offers to play college baseball, Howard chose to attend California Polytechnic State University (Cal Poly) and major in business. In August 2015, before arriving at Cal Poly, Howard contacted the Mustangs baseball program and said that he was interested in playing for them. He impressed coaches at a fall tryout camp, pitching up to 88 mph (142 km/h), and was one of 35 players named to the team. Howard chose to redshirt his freshman year in order to put on more muscle mass. He took up a yoga-based athletic program, gained 10 pounds (4.5 kg), and improved his fastball speed from 86–87 mph (138–140 km/h) to above 90 mph (140 km/h).

The summer after his freshman year of college, Howard played collegiate summer baseball with the Bellingham Bells of the West Coast League. Under the supervision of pitching coach Jim Clem, he spent the summer diversifying his pitching repertoire with a new breaking ball and changeup. Playing as a redshirt freshman in 2016, Howard served as a relief pitcher for the Mustangs, where he posted a 3–1 record and a 2.95 ERA, striking out 39 batters in 36 2/3 innings. Howard also recorded one save. In his 21 season appearances, Howard averaged more than 9.5 strikeouts per nine innings pitched.

Howard returned to Bellingham for another season of summer baseball in 2016. Most of his work with Clem that summer was in building his strength, in the hopes that he would become a starting pitcher. After a member of the Cal Poly starting rotation suffered an injury, Howard was called to fill in as a starting pitcher for the 2017 season. Partway through his redshirt sophomore season, Fangraphs named Howard the top overall draft-eligible pitcher, as well as the top starter, in the Big West Conference. He went 8–1 that season in 17 games, 12 of which were starts, with a 2.05 ERA and 97 strikeouts in 87 2/3 innings. MLB.com ranked Howard the 99th-best prospect in his draft class, while Baseball America ranked him 137th.

== Professional career ==
=== Draft and minor leagues (2017–2019) ===
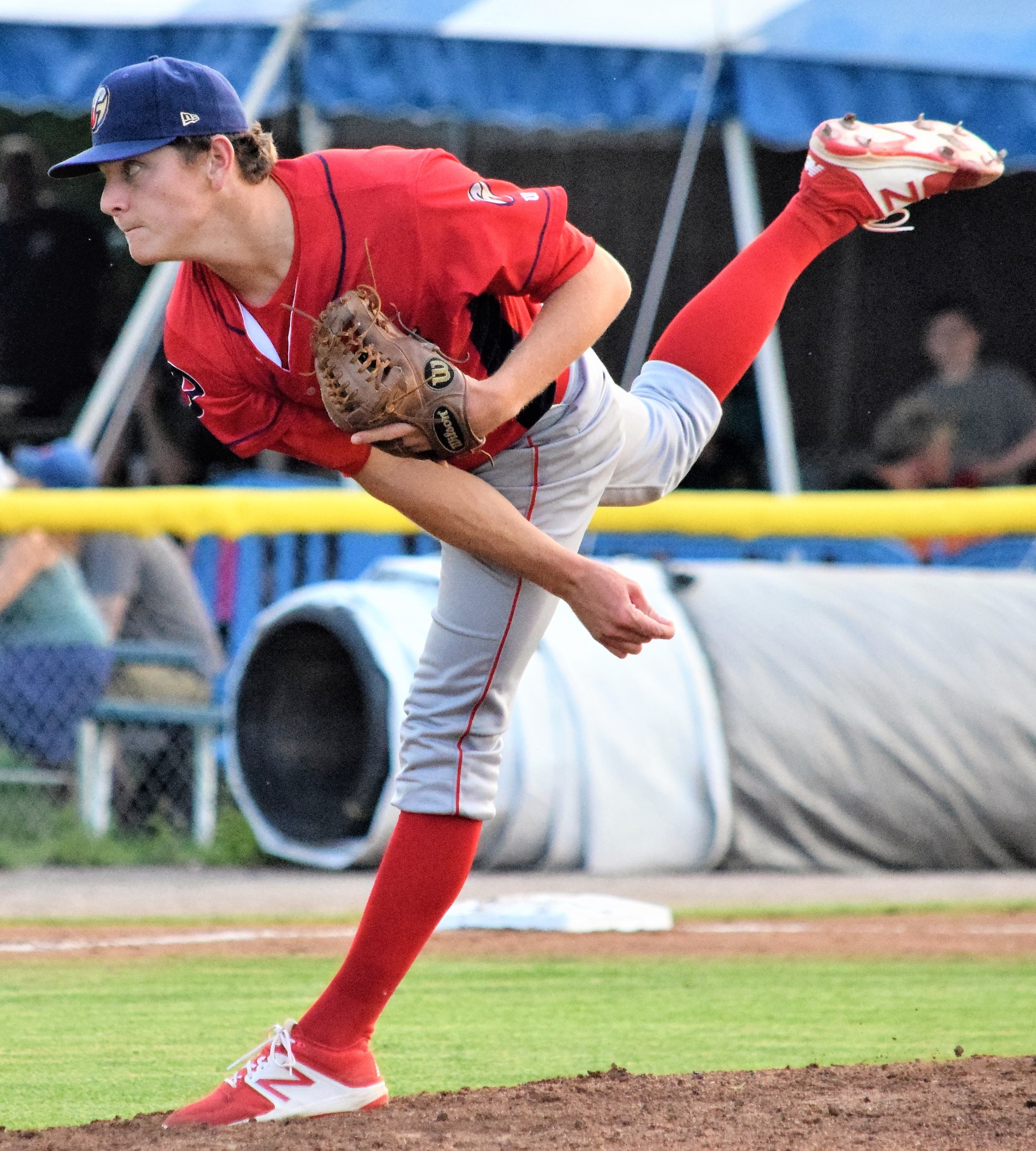
Howard with the Williamsport Crosscutters in 2017

The Philadelphia Phillies of Major League Baseball (MLB) selected Howard in the second round, 45th overall, of the 2017 Major League Baseball draft. He was the third-highest draft pick in Cal Poly history, and the highest that year. Howard signed with the team that June for a $1.15 million signing bonus. Howard bypassed the Rookie League, being assigned to the Low–A Williamsport Crosscutters of the New York–Penn League. In his first season of professional baseball, Howard put up a 1–1 record with a 4.45 ERA and 40 strikeouts in 28 1/3 innings over nine starts. Williamsport pitching coach Hector Berrios spent the season improving Howard's pitching mechanics, making him and the rest of the rotation focus on the lower half of his body, a move which helped to stabilize Howard's velocity and preserve the health of his arm after each start.

Howard spent the entire 2018 season with the Single–A Lakewood BlueClaws of the South Atlantic League, where he earned Pitcher of the Week honors twice. On June 30, Howard recorded a career-high 10 strikeouts in six shutout innings against the Hagerstown Suns. He told reporters that the game was "the first time all year that all my stuff has been synced up and I've been able to command all four of my pitches". Two starts later, Howard pitched his first complete game in a 4–1 win over the Asheville Tourists. He pitched 112 innings for the BlueClaws in 2018, posting a 3.78 ERA in 23 starts and striking out 147 batters. On September 7, 2018, Howard pitched the first postseason no-hitter in BlueClaws history, striking out nine batters in the semifinal championship series against the Kannapolis Cannon Ballers and advancing the BlueClaws to the South Atlantic League championships. For his no-hitter, Howard received a Minor League Baseball Yearly Award for Top Performance.

The following season, Howard was assigned to the High–A Clearwater Threshers of the Florida State League. He achieved another career-high strikeout performance on April 23, recording 11 in a 1–0 win against the Florida Fire Frogs. He missed two months of the season with shoulder soreness, returning to Clearwater on July 9, 2019, for four shutout innings against the Palm Beach Cardinals. At the end of July, Howard was promoted to the Double-A Reading Fightin' Phils of the Eastern League. He went 3–1 for the season, posting a 2.03 ERA and striking out 94 batters in 71 innings with Clearwater, Reading, and a pair of rehab appearances with the GCL Phillies. At the end of the season, Howard was named a Phillies Organization All-Star. After the season, Howard was one of six Phillies prospects assigned to the Scottsdale Scorpions of the Arizona Fall League. He planned to use the league to build his pitching time and make up for the two months that were missed due to a shoulder injury, while working on some of his newer pitches. In six fall league starts, Howard posted a 1–1 record and a 2.11 ERA, striking out 27 batters in 21 1/3 innings of work.

=== Philadelphia Phillies (2020–2021) ===
On June 30, 2020, Minor League Baseball chose to cancel its 2020 season due to the COVID-19 pandemic. Several Phillies prospects, including Howard, began the pandemic-shortened season by practicing at an alternate training site in Allentown, Pennsylvania. The decision not to include Howard on the opening day roster was motivated both by a desire to see his pitching control and for contractual reasons; by waiting at least five days into the season to promote him to the major leagues, the Phillies maintained control of Howard's contract through the 2026 season. Howard made his major league debut on August 9, 2020, starting on the mound for the second game of a doubleheader against the Atlanta Braves. He struck out four batters in 4 2/3 innings, but allowed four runs on seven hits, including two home runs, and the Braves won the game 8–0. His first career win came on August 31, when he pitched five innings of an 8–6 victory over the Washington Nationals, striking out sluggers Trea Turner and Juan Soto in the process. Despite leaving a September 12 start with more shoulder pain, Howard was included on the Phillies' 40-man roster on September 20. Howard pitched only 24 1/3 innings in his rookie season, and posted a 5.92 ERA, allowing 30 hits and six home runs while striking out 23 batters.

Howard's limited performance in 2020 led to the offseason acquisitions of Matt Moore and Chase Anderson as back-of-the-rotation starters for the Phillies in 2021. Howard, meanwhile, was assigned to the Triple-A Lehigh Valley IronPigs at the start of the season in order to build his arm strength. Continued issues with Anderson's pitch control and inability to consistently record outs pushed the pitcher to the bullpen on May 21, with Howard called up to fill his place in the starting rotation. Howard struggled with stamina in his first two season starts, with his fastball velocity dropping over the course of the first few innings. Both times, Ranger Suárez was called to the mound to provide long relief, and manager Joe Girardi told reporters that he planned on utilizing the two pitchers together for the remainder of the season, with Suárez providing relief as Howard continued to build strength and experience. On June 29, after five starts of 68 or fewer pitches each, the Phillies optioned Howard to Lehigh Valley. He was called back up for a July 22 start against the New York Yankees after Zach Eflin suffered a knee injury and Bailey Falter was placed on COVID-19 protocols. He pitched three innings on short rest and maintained his velocity on both a fastball and slider throughout the appearance. After leaving the team, Howard referred to his time in Philadelphia as like "trying to polish a turd", contrasting the Phillies' immediate desire to win games with the more long-term pitching development that he had required at the time.

=== Texas Rangers (2021–2023) ===
On July 30, 2021, the Phillies traded Howard, Kevin Gowdy, and Josh Gessner to the Texas Rangers in exchange for Kyle Gibson, Ian Kennedy, and Hans Crouse. The Rangers coaching staff hoped to transition Howard into a full-time major-league starting pitcher, in contrast to Philadelphia, where he had bounced between the major and minor leagues, as well as between the rotation and the bullpen. In his Texas debut, Howard lasted two no-hit innings before allowing three runs in the third inning. He was taken out of the game after allowing his fourth base runner, and the Rangers lost to the Los Angeles Angels 5–0. Howard's difficulties with consistency and pitch delivery in later innings, as well as a drop in velocity, followed him in Texas, and he finished his first full major league season with an 0–5 record and a 7.43 ERA in 19 games, striking out 52 batters in 49 2/3 innings.

Howard beat A. J. Alexy and Glenn Otto in spring training to become the Rangers' fifth starter for the 2022 season. He suffered a blister and cracked fingernail shortly into the season and was placed on the injured list on April 11. He made 10 appearances (8 starts) for Texas in 2022, registering a 2-4 record and 7.41 ERA with 32 strikeouts in 37.2 innings pitched.

On April 10, 2023, Howard was placed on the 60-day injured list with a right lat strain. He was activated on June 5.

=== New York Yankees (2023) ===
On August 1, 2023, the Rangers traded Howard to the New York Yankees for cash considerations. He was subsequently assigned to the Yankees’ Triple–A affiliate, the Scranton/Wilkes-Barre RailRiders, where he struggled immensely to a 16.88 ERA with 4 strikeouts in 2 2/3 innings pitched. Howard was released by the Yankees on August 30.

=== San Francisco Giants (2023–2024) ===
On September 23, 2023, Howard signed a minor league contract with the San Francisco Giants organization.

Howard began the 2024 season with the Triple–A Sacramento River Cats, posting a 5.90 ERA with 57 strikeouts across 10 starts. On May 28, 2024, the Giants selected Howard's contract, adding him to their active roster. In 7 games (2 starts), he compiled a 5.63 ERA with 21 strikeouts across 24 innings of work. Howard was designated for assignment by San Francisco on June 30.

=== Cleveland Guardians (2024) ===
On July 5, 2024, Howard was traded to the Cleveland Guardians in exchange for cash considerations. In 2 appearances for Cleveland, he allowed 8 runs (5 earned) on 11 hits with 6 strikeouts over 5 innings pitched. Howard was designated for assignment by the Guardians on July 21. He cleared waivers and was sent outright to the Triple-A Columbus Clippers on July 27. Howard declined the outright assignment the following day, electing free agency instead.

=== Second stint with Giants (2024) ===
On August 8, 2024, Howard re–signed with the San Francisco Giants on a minor league contract. In 22 games (10 starts) for the Triple–A Sacramento River Cats in 2024, he compiled a 3–3 record and 6.57 ERA with 87 strikeouts across 61 2/3 innings pitched. Howard elected free agency following the season on November 4.

=== Tohoku Rakuten Golden Eagles (2025) ===
On December 8, 2024, Howard signed with the Tohoku Rakuten Golden Eagles of Nippon Professional Baseball (NPB) for the 2025 season. After missing the start of the season with lower back stiffness, Howard made his NPB debut on May 14, against the Chiba Lotte Marines; he earned the win after pitching seven scoreless innings with five hits and no walks. In nine appearances for Rakuten, Howard posted a 5-1 record and 2.22 ERA with 36 strikeouts across 48 2/3 innings pitched. On December 3, 2025, Howard and the Eagles parted ways.

=== Yomiuri Giants (2026–present) ===
Howard signed with NPB's Yomiuri Giants on December 31, 2025. The Giants were in need of another experienced right-handed pitcher after losing several players to injury late in the previous season.

== Pitcher profile ==
Howard has carried a four-pitch repertoire throughout his professional career. His pitching is rooted in a fastball, with a changeup, slider, and curveball acting as off-speed pitches. In 2018, when one particular pitch was struggling to land during a game, Howard would retire it for the rest of the game and focus on the others; a goal that he set in 2019 was to maintain all four pitches throughout an outing. Howard's fastball has averaged 94 mph (151 km/h) during the 2021 season, while his changeup averages 79 mph (127 km/h), his slider 82 mph (132 km/h), and his curveball at 74 mph (119 km/h).

There have been concerns about Howard's long-term health and ability to pitch deep into games. As a rookie in 2020, Howard lost 11 pounds (5.0 kg) between spring training and the start of the pandemic-abbreviated season, and his irregular practice in the spring and summer led to a loss of strength and stamina. His average fastball velocity dropped from 95 mph (153 km/h) in the first inning to 91.7 mph (147.6 km/h) in the fifth, with batters hitting more effectively against the slower pitches. A recurring shoulder injury has also limited Howard's long-term effectiveness. The most he has ever pitched in a season has been 112 innings in 2018; shoulder problems limited his 2019 season to 92 1/3 innings, while a combination of injury and the COVID-19 pandemic shortened his 2020 season down to 24 1/3. During the 2020–21 offseason, Howard pursued physical therapy to prevent a recurrence of the injury, while making changes to his pitching mechanics, particularly in his hips, that were aimed to limit the damage.
