= Artificial crowd noise =

Pre-recorded audio simulating event spectator sounds

Artificial crowd noise is pre-recorded audio that simulates the live sounds of spectators, particularly during sporting events.

Sports teams have used artificial crowd noise to simulate stadium sounds during practices to acclimate themselves to conditions they would face in actual games, and some have accused teams of using artificial crowd noise on top of in-person crowds to distract opposing teams.

Regular use of such audio grew during the COVID-19 pandemic, which required many sporting events to be played with no spectators due to restrictions on gatherings or use of facilities. This audio is usually mixed to correspond with in-game events.

== Uses ==
Some American football teams, particularly within the NFL, have used white noise or artificial crowd noise during practices to acclimate players to stadium conditions of actual games. It may also be mixed with music played at a similar volume to make it harder to tune out the increased sound.

There have been accusations on several occasions, including the Indianapolis Colts in 2007, and the Minnesota Twins during the 1987 World Series (as speculated by sportscaster Al Michaels in a 2015 interview), that teams have intentionally sweetened their in-person attendance with artificial crowd noise in an effort to distract the visiting team (with the Colts, in particular, accused of doing so to make it harder for the New England Patriots to call their plays). In the case of the former, the NFL exonerated the Colts and ruled that this had not actually occurred.

In May 2013 during a Zürich Derby football match, fans of both clubs protested against heightened security measures by not entering the stadium until 10 minutes after kickoff. Swiss broadcaster SRF added artificial crowd noise to its highlights of the match, and later apologized for having manipulated the footage.

=== Events being played behind closed doors ===
External videos
- Champions league final 2020 with no live spectators and artificial crowd noise, YouTube video

The COVID-19 pandemic prompted teams to play many sporting events behind closed doors with no spectators to maintain player safety and reduce large gatherings that can spread Coronavirus disease 2019 (COVID-19).

Artificial crowd noise was used to preserve a degree of normalcy (via a suspension of disbelief), especially during events where a lack of crowd would be considered unusual to viewers and/or players. Audio used for this purpose was often compiled from stock of previous games (in some cases, originally compiled for use in a sports video game). The crowd noise sometimes included audio associated with the sport or home team, such as specific chants, and in the case of football in South Africa, the sounds of vuvuzelas.

There were varying approaches to the practice, including whether the sounds were played over a venue's audio systems or only for television viewers, and whether the audio is synchronized in real-time to correspond with in-game events. It was usually mixed by an audio engineer on-site, but some events also employed mobile apps that allowed viewers to influence the sounds by voting on reactions. The Philadelphia Union employed a member of their supporters' group to provide input to the sound engineers. For the 2020 US Open, IBM trained its Watson artificial intelligence system to cue crowd noise automatically, using footage from past editions of the tournament to determine appropriate reactions to in-game events. In some cases, artificial crowd noise was paired with the use of augmented reality to fill in empty stands with CGI "spectators" (as used during La Liga and trialled by U.S. broadcaster Fox Sports), or the use of virtual audiences displayed on video boards within the venue.

The practice was overall met with mixed reception from viewers and sportswriters, usually dependent on the quality of the execution. One football writer argued that artificial crowds were "disingenuous" and created a disconnect with accounts of games noting the lack of spectators, and felt that viewers were missing out on the ability to hear on-field communications between players, arguing that "if a game that generally produces one of the most fierce atmospheres in the world is being played in front of a silent backdrop, that's as much a part of the story as the result."

== See also ==
- Laugh track
