= Studio audience =

Audience present for the recording of all or part of a program in a studio

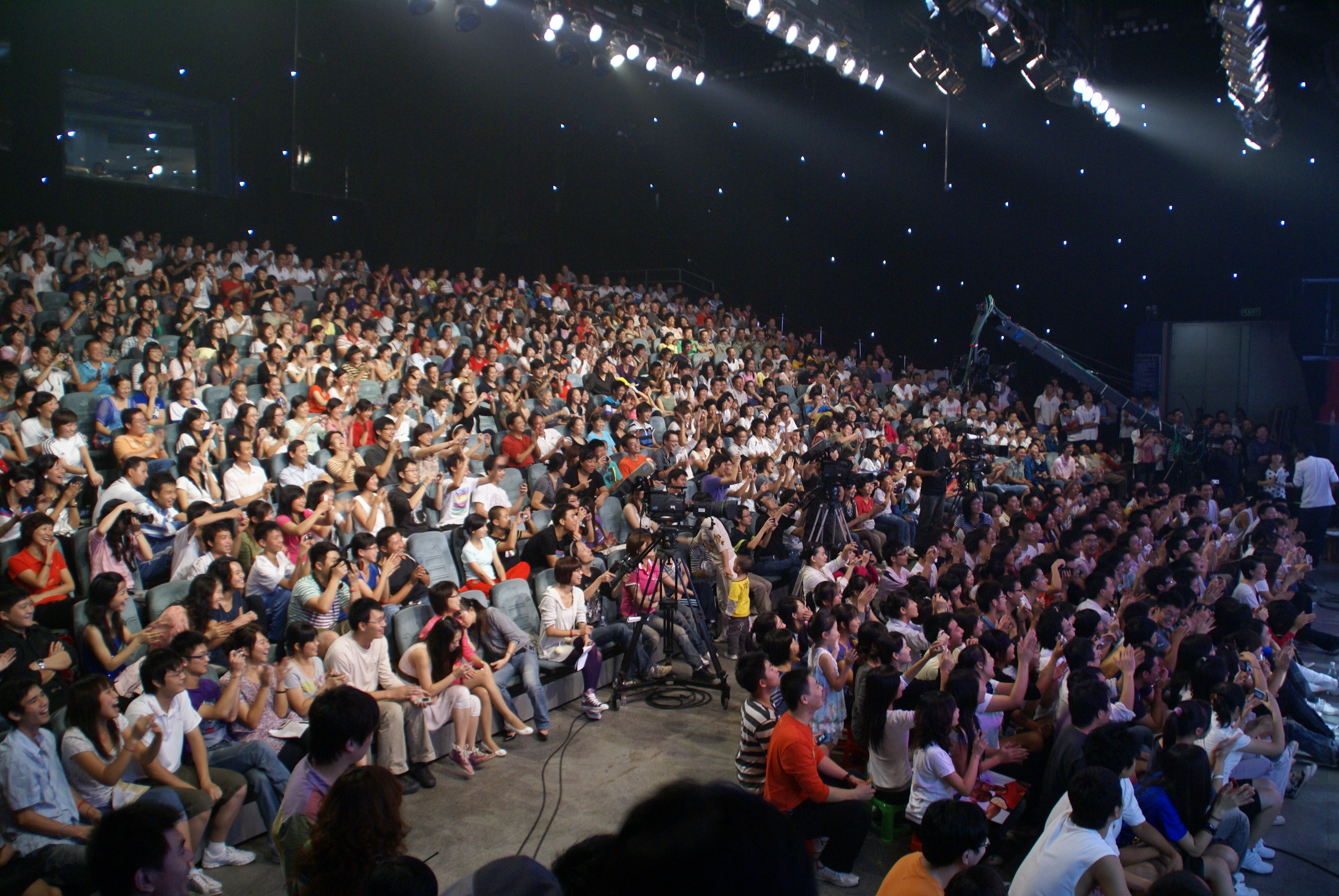
Studio audience at Hunan Television, China

A studio audience is an audience present for the recording of all or part of a television program or radio program. The primary purpose of the studio audience is to provide applause and/or laughter to the program's soundtrack (as opposed to canned laughter).

In the United States, tickets to be a part of a studio audience are usually given away. However, as an enticement to attend, one or more members of the audience may be selected to win a prize, which is usually provided by a manufacturer in exchange for an advertisement, usually at the end of the show. Some game shows, such as Let's Make a Deal and The Price Is Right, select contestants directly from the studio audience.

For sitcom/sketch comedy shows like All in the Family, Saturday Night Live and Happy Days (for indoor scenes), the use of a live studio audience essentially turns them into de facto stage productions while shooting individual scenes, with minor problems like the audience applauding or uproariously whooping (the latter since becoming a satirical cliché in shows which mock the format and tropes of traditional sitcoms) when their favorite performers enter the stage. Shows like The Red Green Show, meanwhile, actually make the audience a part of the show, since that show is supposedly a television broadcast made from the (fictional) Possum Lodge, cast members react and speak directly to the audience as if they were talking to the viewers at home.

== History ==
Most early radio shows in the United States were recorded in the presence of a studio audience, including comedies such as The Jack Benny Program, The Phil Harris-Alice Faye Show, and Fibber McGee and Molly, as well as anthology series like The Mercury Theatre and Lux Radio Theatre.

In its earliest days, most television broadcasts stemmed from the world of New York theater. Stage veterans were experienced in performing for a crowd. Starting in the 1940s, these plays were broadcast live. Thus, these plays were now directed towards both the live audience and those watching from home.

Premiering in 1951, I Love Lucy was the first television series to be filmed in front of an audience. This was made possible by the idea of Desi Arnaz to use multi-camera setup, a concept which had been pioneered by Jerry Fairbanks, and which had been used on The Silver Theater and Truth or Consequences. This implementation allowed the show to benefit from the strengths of both stage plays (live audience) and film (camera angle options, point of view, etc.). This approach produced a marriage between cinema and theater; television and plays. This approach was subsequently adopted by most American network sitcoms until the 2000s, when one characteristic of that era's Golden Age of Television was a resurgence in single-camera setup sitcoms without studio audiences, although studio-audience sitcoms continued to be made.

Although radio broadcasts for a studio audience have for the most part ended for commercial radio programs (outside of special "road show" episodes), public radio shows such as A Prairie Home Companion, Wait Wait... Don't Tell Me!, Says You!, Tent Show Radio and Whad'Ya Know? are mainly performed in front of live audiences in theaters or art centers, if not a confined studio setting.

Due to the COVID-19 pandemic, a large number of television programs were forced to conduct tapings without live audiences due to restrictions on gatherings. Some shows usually filmed in front of a studio audience used canned applause and laugh tracks instead, in some cases accompanied by stock footage of audiences from previous episodes filmed prior to pandemic restrictions. Some shows—particularly talk shows, game shows, and reality competitions—have adopted virtual audiences, whereby audience members appear from their homes via webcams and videoconferencing.

== Crowd reactions ==
While the audience's reactions can be inspired by the show itself, they may also be cued to respond with applause or other reactions by illuminated signs. Modern applause signs might be simply a text that shows up in the monitors, which audience members see during the show. In the early television era, applause signs were made from cardboard and other materials that studio staff members showed to the audience to get the desired reaction.

Television tapings for sitcoms and talk shows have a warm-up comedian who warms up the crowd before the recording starts and sometimes in between the commercials or between the scenes. The warm-up comedian usually will familiarize the audience members with the Applause signs which are facing the audience near monitor screens. Before the show, the audience is given some training on how and when to applaud and told to be loud and enthusiastic so that the people at home can hear them.

Applause signs are currently being used on late night talk shows including The Tonight Show Starring Jimmy Fallon, Late Night with Seth Meyers as well as variety and sketch comedy shows like Saturday Night Live, The Daily Show among others.

In some cases, a studio audience can be called upon to vote, to help a contestant(s) (such as with Who Wants to Be a Millionaire?) or pass judgment on a politician (such as with Question Time).

== See also ==
- Audience response
- Clap-o-meter
- Cue card
- Laugh track
