= Murder of Elyse Pahler =

American murder victim (1980–1995)

Elyse Pahler
- Elyse Pahler at age 15
- Born: Elyse Marie Pahler; April 24, 1980; Templeton, California, U.S.
- Died: July 22, 1995 (aged 15); Arroyo Grande, California, U.S.

Elyse Marie Pahler (April 24, 1980 – July 22, 1995) was a 15-year-old Arroyo Grande High School (in Arroyo Grande, California) freshman who was murdered on July 22, 1995, by three teenage boys, Royce Casey, Jacob Delashmutt, and Joseph Fiorella.

Casey, Delashmutt, and Fiorella lured Elyse Pahler to a remote location and stabbed her to death as a sacrifice to Satan. The trio, who formed a band together, had planned the act for months, believing that murdering Pahler would increase their musical abilities and musicianship. They were each sentenced to 25 to 26 years to life in prison.

In 2000, Pahler's family unsuccessfully attempted to sue American thrash band Slayer, claiming that the band's music incited the boys to murder their daughter. The lawsuit was dismissed by a judge.

== Background ==
Elyse Pahler was "a vivacious, curious teenager with a dramatic flair--she designed and sewed her own dresses." She attended Arroyo Grande High School with Royce Casey, Jacob Delashmutt, and Joseph Fiorella who were self-professed "cult followers" of Slayer, who founded their own thrash metal group known as "Hatred". More obsessed than his two friends, Fiorella studied Slayer song lyrics “as if they held deep meaning," admitting that "the music started to influence the way [he] looked at things." Fiorella later asked Delashmutt if he would be interested in sacrificing a virgin, selecting their classmate, Elyse Pahler, because he was "obsessed with her and obsessed with killing her."

== Crime ==
On July 22, 1995, Casey, Delashmutt, and Fiorella lured Elyse Pahler to a Nipomo Mesa eucalyptus grove, telling her that they were going to smoke cannabis. Shortly after arrival, Delashmutt strangled Pahler with a belt before Fiorella stabbed her in the neck with a hunting knife. Delashmutt and Casey then stabbed her several more times in the neck and back. As Pahler "moaned on the ground, Casey stomped on the back of her neck." Since none of the wounds were fatal, Pahler slowly bled to death. After the boys were sure that Pahler died, Delashmutt started to pull off Pahler's pants, since they had previously discussed raping her corpse. Court documents reported that Casey "said they should leave instead, and the men buried Pahler in a shallow grave and left the area."

Pahler's body was discovered after Casey confessed his role in the crime to a clergyman. The clergyman notified police, and Casey led authorities to Pahler's partially mummified remains. All three were taken into custody and charged "with seven counts, including murder, conspiracy to commit murder, conspiracy to commit rape, and kidnapping." Authorities initially pursued torture and rape charges, but "officials [were] unable to determine whether she was sexually assaulted due to the decomposition of her remains."

The murder was described in court documents as "one of the most brutal and horrific murders in the history of San Luis Obispo County." Casey, Delashmutt, and Fiorella were convicted and sentenced to 25 to 26 years in prison. During the trial, the District Attorney's Office's chief investigator, Doug Odom, testified that the three teenagers had picked Pahler because "she had blonde hair and blue eyes, and because she was a virgin, she would be a perfect sacrifice for the devil." When asked why they committed the crime, Odom reported that Casey said, "By making this perfect sacrifice to the devil, they would gain more craziness, or 'nuts…' That would make them play harder, play faster. And by making this perfect sacrifice to the devil, it might help them go, quote, professional.”

== Subsequent lawsuit ==
David and Lisanne Pahler claimed that the Slayer songs "Altar Of Sacrifice" and "Dead Skin Mask" (from the albums Reign in Blood and Seasons in the Abyss, respectively) gave the three killers detailed instructions to "stalk, rape, torture, murder, and commit acts of necrophilia" on their daughter. The lawsuit was originally filed in 1996 but delayed until 2000 when the killers' trial was concluded. The initial case was originally thrown out, the judge stating, "There's not a legal position that could be taken that would make Slayer responsible for the girl's death. Where do you draw the line? You might as well start looking through the library at every book on the shelf."

Undeterred, the Pahlers launched a second lawsuit claiming that Slayer "knowingly distributed harmful material to minors." This case too was dismissed, with Judge E. Jeffrey Burke stating, "I do not consider Slayer's music obscene, indecent, or harmful to minors."

Jacob Delashmutt himself stated in a Washington Post interview, "The music is destructive [but] that's not why Elyse was murdered. She was murdered because Joe [Fiorella] was obsessed with her and obsessed with killing her."

== Aftermath ==
Royce Casey was denied parole by governor Gavin Newsom in July 2021. However, a superior court judge in June 2022 overturned the decision and granted parole to Casey which was reversed by the California Court of Appeal. Joseph Fiorella had a parole hearing tentatively scheduled for July 2023 after voluntarily waiving his right to a hearing for one year, and Jacob Delashmutt had a parole hearing scheduled for December 2024.

Royce Casey was imprisoned in Valley State Prison, Joseph Fiorella in High Desert State Prison, and Jacob Delashmutt in Correctional Training Facility.

Delashmutt was released in July 2025. Casey was released in August 2025.
