= Sweetening (show business) =

Sound design practice

Sweetening is a sound design practice in which additional audio and effects are used to enhance audio already recorded.

In the case of a music performance or recording, sweetening may refer to the process of adding instruments in post-production such as those found on "The Sounds of Silence" by folk musicians Simon and Garfunkel. The original acoustic version of the song features just their vocals with one guitar. Producers at Columbia Records, however, felt that it needed a little spicing up to be a commercial hit, and so without the consent of the artists, they added drums, electric bass and electric guitar.

In television, sweetening refers to the use of a laugh track in addition to a live studio audience. The laugh track is used to "enhance" the laughter for television audiences, sometimes in cases where a joke or scene intended to be funny does not draw the expected response, and sometimes to avoid awkward sound edits when a scene is shortened or more than one take is used in editing. Some shows used this technique very obviously rather than the "in-between" technique (a recording from an external audience, but genuine laughter) described as a laugh track. An obvious sign of this is that the laughter is more or less identical in volume or magnitude, regardless of how extreme the joke is. Sweetening can also be used in a similar manner for other types of reactions like cheering.

== See also ==
- Carroll Pratt
- Charles Douglass
- Canned heat
- Artificial crowd noise

== Literature ==
- Simons, David (2004). Studio Stories - How the Great New York Records Were Made. San Francisco: Backbeat Books. Cf. pp.94-97.
