= Templeton High School =

Location
- 1200 Main Street; Templeton, California; United States
- Coordinates: 35.5419°N 120.7112°W

Information
- Type: Public
- School district: Templeton Unified School District
- Principal: Jessica Lloyd
- Faculty: 36.72 (FTE)
- Enrollment: 738 (2023–2024)
- Student to teacher ratio: 20.10
- Colors: Green, Gray, White
- Mascot: Eagle
- Website: templetonhs.schoolloop.com

Templeton High School is a WASC accredited public high school providing 9th-12th grade education in Templeton, California. In 2006, Templeton High School was nationally recognized as a (NCLB) Blue Ribbon School. It offers a large number of Advanced Placement classes for a school of its size.

Templeton High School is located at the end of Main Street. Enrollment has grown substantially during the past decade. The school comprises 43 classrooms, a library, multi-purpose room, food services area, two locker complexes, eating areas, a gymnasium (with seating capacity for 1200), and a vocational/technology area composed of wood, metals, CAD, and ornamental horticulture classrooms. An active 7-acre (2.8 ha) farm is located on “Ag Hill” with indoor/outdoor facilities for large and small animals. A sports complex consisting of baseball fields is located at Vineyard Elementary School. A permanent restroom facility was added to the complex in 2005. The Performing Arts Center opened its doors for the winter concerts in December 2002 with 340 seats and the new varsity stadium held its first football game in the fall of 2005.

== Extracurricular activities ==
Templeton High School is home to a band program that includes a concert band, jazz band, marching band, winter drum line, and winter guard. The marching band, which numbers under 50 individuals, placed first in their division and was the overall best band in the Atascadero Colony Days Band Competition in 2009 and 2013.

The school mock trial team has also had a long history of success. The team has won the county competition and proceeded to state finals for 12 of the last 15 years. In 2009/2010, the team medaled at state finals in San Jose and also won two first-place awards for individuals.
