= Charles Douglass =

American sound engineer (1910–2003)

Charley Douglass
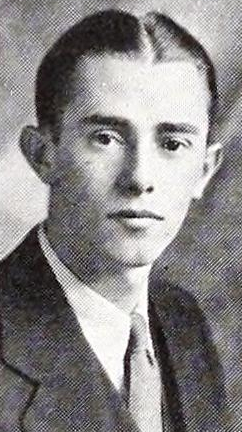
- Douglass in the University of Nevada, Reno yearbook, 1933
- Born: Charles Rolland Douglass; January 2, 1910; Guadalajara, Jalisco, Mexico
- Died: April 8, 2003 (aged 93); Templeton, California, U.S.
- Other name: Charley Douglass
- Spouse: Dorothy Lorraine Dunn

Charles Rolland Douglass (January 2, 1910 – April 8, 2003) was a Mexican-born American sound engineer, credited as the inventor of the laugh track.

== Early years ==
Douglass was born in Guadalajara, Mexico, in 1910 to an American family. His father was an electrical engineer on assignment there, and eventually relocated the family to Nevada. Douglass graduated from the University of Nevada with a bachelor's degree in electrical engineering, and eventually found work as a sound engineer with CBS Radio in Los Angeles. During World War II, Douglass served in the Navy and worked in Washington with engineers developing shipboard radar systems.

== The mysterious "laff box" ==
Before radio and television, audiences almost always experienced comedic productions in groups. Television producers attempted to recreate this atmosphere in the early days by introducing laughter or other crowd reactions into the soundtrack of TV programs. However, live audiences could not be relied upon to laugh at the correct moment. Douglass noticed this problem, and decided to remedy the situation. If a joke did not get the desired chuckle, Douglass inserted additional laughter. If the live audience chuckled too long, Douglass gradually muted the laughter. This editing technique became known as "sweetening," in which pre-recorded laughter is used to augment the response of the real studio audience if they did not react as desired.

At first, Douglass's technique was used sparingly on live shows like The Jack Benny Program; as a result, its invention went unnoticed. By the end of the 1950s, live comedy transitioned from film to videotape, which allowed for editing during post-production. By editing a prerecorded live show, bumps and gaps were present in the soundtrack. Douglass was called upon to "bridge" or "fill" these gaps. Both performers and producers gradually began to realize the power behind prerecorded laughter. Comedian Milton Berle, while witnessing a post-production editing session, once said, "as long as we are here, this joke didn't get all that we wanted." After Douglass inserted a guffaw after a failed joke, Berle reportedly commented, "See? I told you it was funny." Douglass went from enhancing soundtracks to orchestrating audience reactions.

By the early 1960s, the recording of TV sitcoms before audiences had fallen out of fashion, and Douglass was employed to simulate audience response for entire programs. Shows like Bewitched, The Munsters and The Beverly Hillbillies are virtually showcases of Douglass' editing work. Low-key shows, like The Andy Griffith Show, The Brady Bunch and My Three Sons, had less raucous laugh tracks, but were entirely fabricated post-production. The practice of simulating an audience reaction was controversial from the beginning, but it became standard practice and a commodity in the industry.

Douglass formed Northridge Electronics in August 1960, named after the Los Angeles suburb in the San Fernando Valley where the Douglass family resided and operated their business. From the late 1950s to the early 1970s, Douglass had a virtual monopoly on the laugh-track business. In 1966, TV Guide critic Dick Hobson said the Douglass family were "the only laugh game in town." When it came time to "lay in the laughs", the producer would direct Douglass where and when to insert the type of laugh requested. Douglass would then go to work at creating the audience, concealed from the producer (or anyone else present at the studio) to preserve the secrecy of his technique. Consequently, few in the industry witnessed Douglass using his invention.

The one-of-a-kind laugh-track device—known throughout the industry as the "laff box"—was secured with padlocks, was more than two feet tall, and operated like an organ. Only immediate members of the family knew how the inside looked. At one time, the laff box was called "the most sought after but well-concealed box in the world". A team of "Laff Boys," technicians trained to operate Douglass's Laff Box, created extremely detailed textures designed to suggest specific ethical situations.

In 1986, Charley's son Bob began experimenting with an all-digital audio computer manufactured by CompuSonics, a Palo Alto, California company, as a replacement for the analog equipment invented by his father. By 1990, Bob was using a custom version of CompuSonics equipment that had multiple channels of digital audio samples and a laptop computer interface for control. The new Laff Box was loaded and unloaded from the trunk of Bob's Mercedes-Benz with a small crane bolted to the trunk floor.

In 2003, the laff box consisted of a digital device approximately the size of a laptop computer which contains hundreds of human sounds.

Douglass' laff box was unearthed in 2010. It was later discussed in detail in a June 2010 episode of Antiques Roadshow, where its historical value was appraised at $10,000.

== Later years and death ==
Douglass moved to Laguna Beach, California, in 1970 and retired there in 1980. He died of pneumonia on April 8, 2003, in Templeton, California, at age 93.

== Personal life ==
Douglass was married for 62 years to Dorothy Dunn Douglass. They had two sons, Steve and Bob. Bob operated Northridge Electronics, the company established by Charley in August 1960, until 2012. Dorothy lived in Laguna Beach until her death in January 2014 at age 95.

== Achievements ==
The Academy of Television Arts & Sciences honored Douglass with a 1992 Emmy for lifetime technical achievement.
