= Laugh track =

Recorded laughter in broadcast comedy show

An example laugh track recorded in 2009

A laugh track (or laughter track) is an audio recording consisting of laughter (and other audience reactions) usually used as a separate soundtrack for comedy productions. The laugh track may contain live audience reactions or artificial laughter (canned laughter or fake laughter) made to be inserted into the show, or a combination of the two. The use of canned laughter to "sweeten" the laugh track was pioneered by American sound engineer Charles Douglass.

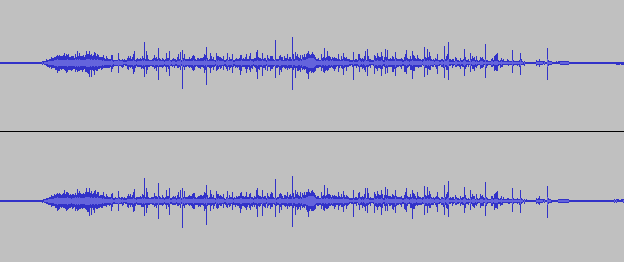
A waveform of an audio track in Audacity with a fake laughter mixed with real studio audience applause which follows immediately after fake laugh

The Douglass laugh track became a standard in mainstream television in the U.S., dominating most prime-time sitcoms and sketch comedies from the late 1950s to the late 1970s. Use of the Douglass laughter decreased by the 1980s upon the development of stereophonic laughter. In addition, single-camera sitcoms eliminated audiences altogether. Canned laughter is used to encourage the viewer to laugh.

== History in the United States ==
=== Radio ===
Before radio and television, audiences experienced live comedy performances in the presence of other audience members. Radio and early television producers used recordings of live shows and later studio-only shows attempted to recreate this atmosphere by introducing the sound of laughter or other crowd reactions into the soundtrack.

Jack Dadswell, former owner of WWJB in Florida, created the first "laughing record".

In 1946, U.S. Army Signal Corps Major Jack Mullin brought back two Magnetophon recorders and 50 reels of magnetic tape from a German radio station at the end of World War II. The high-fidelity recorders had been built by German companies BASF and AEG and could record 20 minutes per reel of high-quality audio. Alexander M. Poniatoff had his Ampex company manufacture a version of the Magnetophon for use in radio production. Popular vocalist Bing Crosby later adopted the technology to pre-record his weekly radio show.

The new recording method allowed sounds to be added during post-production. Jack Mullin explained how the laugh track was invented on Crosby's show:

The hillbilly comic Bob Burns was on the show one time, and threw a few of his then-extremely racy and off-color folksy farm stories into the show. We recorded it live, and they all got enormous laughs, which just went on and on, but we couldn't use the jokes. Today those stories would seem tame by comparison, but things were different in radio then, so scriptwriter Bill Morrow asked us to save the laughs. A couple of weeks later he had a show that wasn't very funny, and he insisted that we put in the salvaged laughs. Thus the laugh-track was born.

=== Early live U.S. television, film; "sweetening" ===
In early television, many shows used the single-camera filmmaking technique, filming each scene several times from different camera angles. Live audiences could not be relied upon to laugh at the "correct" moments, or might laugh too loudly or too long.

CBS sound engineer Charley Douglass noticed these inconsistencies, and took sweetening audience reactions. If a joke did not get the desired chuckle, Douglass inserted additional recorded laughter; if the live audience chuckled too long, Douglass gradually muted the guffaws. The process could also be used to "desweeten" audience reactions by toning down unwanted loud laughter to conform with the producer's conception.

Douglass built a prototype laugh machine using a reel of tape containing recordings of mild laughs glued to the edge of a 28 inch wooden wheel. The machine was operated by a key that played until it hit another detent on the wheel, playing a complete laugh. CBS demanded possession of the machine when Douglass left the company and the prototype machine fell apart within months of use. Douglass expanded his technique in 1953 by extracting laughter and applause from recorded pantomime segments of The Red Skelton Show and other sources. The recorded sounds were placed into a huge tape machine.

The first American television show to incorporate a laugh track was the sitcom The Hank McCune Show in 1950. Other single-camera filmed shows soon followed suit though several, like The Trouble with Father (ABC, 1950–1955), The Beulah Show (ABC, 1950–1952) and The Goldbergs (1949–1956), did not feature an audience or laugh-track. The anthology series Four Star Playhouse did not utilize a laugh-track or audience on its occasional comedic episodes, with co-producer David Niven calling the laugh track "wild indiscriminate mirth" and stating, "We shall carry on without mechanical tricks".

==== Multi-camera shows ====
Soon after the introduction of the laugh track, Lucille Ball and Desi Arnaz began filming their sitcom I Love Lucy with a live studio audience using a setup of multiple film cameras. The show had no laugh track and used audience reactions. Some multi-camera shows with live audiences would use recorded laughs to supplement responses. For variety shows, the migration to videotape from live broadcast allowed editing before the show aired, but editing a taped audience would cause bumps and gaps on the soundtrack. Charley Douglass was called on to bridge the gaps.

Both performers and producers began to realize the power behind prerecorded laughter. While witnessing an early post-production editing session, comedian Milton Berle once pointed out a particular joke and said, "as long as we're here doing this, that joke didn't get the response we wanted". After Douglass inserted a hearty laugh following the failed joke, Berle reportedly commented, "See? I told you it was funny". The comedian Bob Hope, while working on one of his television specials, took Douglass's hands in his own and began rubbing them to create the effect of limbering up Douglass's fingers, saying "OK, now, give me some good laughs."

=== 1960s ===
As the medium evolved, production costs associated with broadcasting live television escalated. Filming with a studio audience, such as I Love Lucy or The Ed Sullivan Show also had limitations: half the audience could not see the show from their seats. Douglass would be brought in to simulate reactions for the duration of the show. Producers soon realized it was simpler to film a show without an audience and tailor the reactions during post-production. Directors initially did not allow space for inserting reactions, making sweetening difficult and causing dialogue to be drowned out. Audience response cards repeatedly came back saying that laughter seemed forced or contrived. Writers began timing scripts to allow space for the laugh track. Directors left pauses for as-yet-unheard audience reactions and producers budgeted for post-production so Douglass could edit with greater ease.

Most television sitcoms produced during the 1950s and 1960s used the single-camera technique, with a laugh track simulating the absent audience. Producers became disenchanted with the multi-camera format; consensus at the time was that live audiences were tense, nervous and rarely laughed on cue.

==== Hogan's Heroes ====
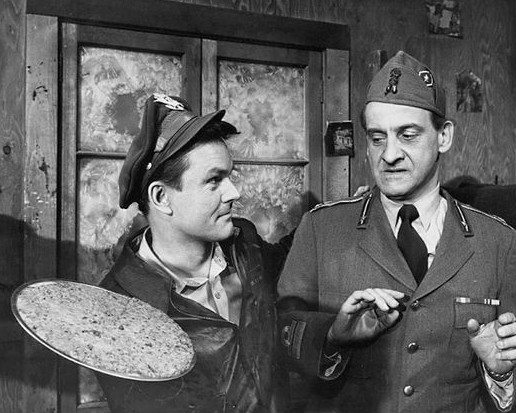
The test to see if a sitcom could survive without a laugh track was performed on the pilot episode of Hogan's Heroes.

Network research indicated that the inclusion of a laugh track was considered essential for categorizing a single-camera show as a comedy. This hypothesis was tested in 1965 when CBS conducted an experiment involving its new single-camera sitcom Hogan's Heroes (1965–1971), presenting two versions of the pilot episode to test audiences: one with a laugh track and one without. The version without the laugh track, due in part to the show's more cerebral humor, performed poorly, while the version with the laugh track garnered a more favorable reception. Consequently, Hogan's Heroes was broadcast with the laugh track, and CBS subsequently incorporated laugh tracks into all of its comedic programming.

Sitcom laugh tracks differed, depending on the style of the show. The more outlandish the show, the more invasive the laugh track. Shows like Bewitched, The Munsters, I Dream of Jeannie and The Beverly Hillbillies relied heavily on laugh tracks, while more subdued programs, like The Andy Griffith Show, The Brady Bunch and My Three Sons, had more modulated laughter. Certain shows, like Get Smart, featured a laugh track that became more invasive as the series progressed, while shows like M*A*S*H toned down the laughter as the series became more dramatic; it was entirely absent during operating room scenes.

By the mid-1960s, nearly every U.S. sitcom was shot using the single camera and was fitted with a laughter track. Only a handful of programs, such as The Joey Bishop Show, The Dick Van Dyke Show, and The Lucy Show used studio audiences but augmented the real laughter via "sweetening."

=== Charley Douglass and the mysterious "laff box" ===
From the late 1950s to the early 1970s, Douglass had a monopoly on the expensive and painstaking laugh business. By 1960, nearly every prime time show in the U.S. was sweetened by Douglass. When it came time to "lay in the laughs", the producer directed Douglass where and when to insert the type of laugh requested. Inevitably, disagreements arose between Douglass and the producer, but the producer had final say. After taking his directive, Douglass went to work at creating the audience, out of sight from the producer or anyone else present at the studio.

Critic Dick Hobson commented in a July 1966 TV Guide article that the Douglass family were "the only laugh game in town." Very few in the industry ever witnessed Douglass using his invention, as he was notoriously secretive about his work, and was one of the most talked-about men in the television industry.

Douglass formed Northridge Electronics in August 1960, named after the Los Angeles suburb in the San Fernando Valley where the Douglass family resided and operated their business in a padlocked garage. When their services were needed, they wheeled the device into the editing room, plugged it in, and went to work. Production studios became accustomed to seeing Douglass shuttling from studio to studio to mix in his manufactured laughs during post-production.

The technological advancements pioneered by Douglass closely resembled those found in musical instruments such as the Chamberlain Music Master and Mellotron. His sophisticated one-of-a-kind device – affectionately known in the industry as the "laff box" – was tightly secured with padlocks, stood more than two feet tall, and operated like an organ. Douglass used a keyboard similar to that of a typewriter to select the corresponding style, gender and age of the laugh as well as a pedal to time the length of the reaction. Inside the machine was a wide array of recorded chuckles, yocks and belly laughs: 320 laughs on 32 tape loops, ten to a loop. Each loop contained up to ten individual audience laughs spliced end-to-end, whirling around simultaneously waiting to be cued up. Since the tapes were looped, laughs were played in the same order repeatedly. Sound engineers could watch sitcoms and knew exactly which recurrent guffaws were next, even if they were viewing an episode for the first time. Douglass frequently combined different laughs, either long or short in length. Attentive viewers could spot when he decided to mix chuckles together to give the effect of a more diverse audience. Rather than being simple recordings of a laughing audience, Douglass's laughs were carefully generated and mixed, giving some laughs detailed identities such as "the guy who gets the joke early" and "housewife giggles" and "the one who didn't get the joke but is laughing anyway" all blended and layered to create the illusion of a real audience responding to the show in question. A man's deep laugh would be switched for a new woman's laugh, or a high-pitched woman's giggle would be replaced with a man's snicker. One producer noticed a recurrent laugh of a woman whom he called "the jungle lady" because of her high-pitched shriek. After regularly complaining to Douglass, the laugh was retired from the regular lineup.

There was also a 30-second "titter" track in the loop, which consisted of individual people laughing quietly. This "titter" track was used to quiet down a laugh and was always playing in the background. When Douglass inserted a hearty laugh, he increased the volume of the titter track to smooth out the final mix. This titter track was expanded to 45 seconds in 1967, later to 60 seconds in 1970, and received overhauls in 1964, 1967, 1970, and 1976. Douglass kept recordings fresh, making minor changes every few months, believing that the viewing audience evolved over time. Douglass also had an array of audience clapping, "oohs" and "ahhhs," as well as people moving in their seats (which many producers insisted be constantly audible).

Only immediate members of the family knew what the inside of the device looked like (at one time, the "laff box" was called "the most sought after but well-concealed box in the world"). More than one member of the Douglass family was involved in the editing process, and each reacted to a joke differently. Charley Douglass was the most conservative of all, so producers often put in bids for Charley's son Bob, who was more liberal in his choice of laughter. Subtle textural changes could have enormous consequences for the ethical situation suggested by a laugh track. Douglass knew his material well, as he had compiled it himself. He had dozens of reactions, and he knew where to find each one. Douglass regularly slightly sped up the laughter to heighten the effect. His work was well appreciated by many in the television industry. Over the years, Douglass added new recordings and revived old ones that had been retired and then retired the newer tracks. Laughter heard in sitcoms of the early 1960s resurfaced years later in the late 1970s. Especially starting in the 1970s, Douglass started alternating the updated laugh track with an older laugh track and even sometimes combined the two together. Up to 40 different laugh clips could be combined and layered at one time, creating the effect of a larger, louder reaction when in fact the same laughs were later heard individually. As the civil rights movement gained momentum, Douglass also started making his laugh track more diverse, including examples of laughter of people from other cultures, whose sounds were noticeably different from white Americans.

Douglass's "laff box" was purchased, unseen, at auction in 2010 when its owner failed to pay rent on the storage locker where it was housed. It was later discussed, and demonstrated in a June 2010 episode of Antiques Roadshow from San Diego, California, where its value was appraised at $10,000 (equivalent to $15,000 in 2025).

=== Cartoons and children's shows ===
The integration of laugh tracks extended beyond live-action programming to include select prime-time animated television series during the mid-20th century. This trend commenced notably with The Rocky and Bullwinkle Show (ABC, 1959–61; NBC, 1961–64), albeit restricted to the initial four episodes of the series. Subsequent to this pioneering endeavor, Hanna-Barbera adopted a similar approach, incorporating comprehensive laugh tracks into its prime-time animated productions until approximately 1970.

Noteworthy examples of Hanna-Barbera's utilization of laugh tracks encompassed acclaimed series such as The Flintstones (ABC, 1960–1966), Top Cat (ABC, 1961–62), and The Jetsons (ABC, 1962–63). Additionally, supplementary productions including Hanna-Barbera's mid-summer sitcom, Where's Huddles? (CBS, 1970), and Krayo Creston and MCA's Calvin and the Colonel (ABC, 1961–62), featured analogous employment of laugh tracks. The incorporation of laugh tracks extended further into midday programming, exemplified by The Banana Splits Adventure Hour (NBC, 1968–1970), gradually aligning with prevailing industry practices.

From the late 1960s through the early 1980s, a substantial proportion of comedic cartoons tailored for the Saturday morning genre embraced the inclusion of laugh tracks. This trend was inaugurated with the debut of Filmation's The Archie Show in 1968, subsequently emulated by industry stalwarts such as Rankin-Bass, DePatie–Freleng Enterprises (DFE), and Hanna-Barbera. However, as the proliferation of laugh tracks grew pervasive, diminishing their novelty and efficacy, animation studios gradually relinquished their reliance on this auditory embellishment by the early 1980s. The denouement of this era was marked by the conclusion of Filmation's Gilligan's Planet (CBS, 1982–83), which stands as the culminating animated Saturday-morning series to feature the inclusion of a laugh track within its framework.

Given its midday time slot, The Banana Splits served as a precursor to Hanna-Barbera's utilization of Charles Douglass's laugh track technology in animated programming aired during Saturday morning hours. This transition commenced with the debut of Scooby-Doo, Where Are You! (CBS, 1969–70) in 1969, marking the inaugural incorporation of Douglass's laugh track within Hanna-Barbera's Saturday morning lineup. Encouraged by the favorable reception of this innovation, Hanna-Barbera proceeded to integrate the laugh track into the majority of its productions for the 1970–71 season. This expansion of the laugh track's usage encompassed a broad spectrum of Hanna-Barbera's animated offerings, including series such as Harlem Globetrotters (CBS, 1970–71) and Josie and the Pussycats (CBS, 1970–71). Such strategic deployment of Douglass's technology mirrored Hanna-Barbera's commitment to enhancing the comedic appeal and viewer engagement of its animated content during the pivotal Saturday morning programming block.

The Pink Panther Show (NBC, 1969–1978; ABC, 1978–1980) was something of an anomaly among its peers. Comprising a compilation of previous theatrical releases, the show adopted a format featuring half-hour showcases, amalgamating various DFE theatrical shorts such as The Inspector, The Ant and the Aardvark and The Tijuana Toads (rebranded as The Texas Toads for television broadcasts due to perceived cultural sensitivities). Notably, the original theatrical versions of these shorts did not incorporate laugh tracks. However, NBC mandated the inclusion of such audio elements for television airing. Consequently, laugh tracks were added to adapt the content for broadcast, a decision driven by network preferences and perceived audience expectations. Subsequently, in 1982, when the DFE theatrical package entered syndication, efforts were undertaken to restore the soundtracks to their original state, aligning with the artistic integrity of the source material. Over time, the repackaging of these shorts has led to the availability of both theatrical and television versions, preserving the diverse auditory experiences associated with each iteration. Exceptions to this trend include Misterjaw and Crazylegs Crane, which were exclusively produced for television and never subjected to theatrical releases, resulting in versions characterized solely by the presence of laughter tracks.

Following the precedent set by Filmation, producers Sid and Marty Krofft adopted Douglass's laugh track technology for their television productions. The pivotal moment occurred with the commencement of production on H.R. Pufnstuf in 1969, when executive producer Si Rose advocated for the inclusion of a laugh track, considering any comedy devoid of such augmentation as inherently disadvantaged. This persuasion led to the incorporation of Douglass's laugh track into H.R. Pufnstuf, setting the stage for its integration into subsequent Krofft productions tailored for Saturday morning television.

Subsequently, the Kroffts enlisted Douglass's services for all their Saturday morning television ventures, excluding the more dramatically oriented Land of the Lost series. This collaborative endeavor extended to a range of productions, including The Bugaloos, Lidsville, Sigmund and the Sea Monsters, The Lost Saucer and Far Out Space Nuts. Transitioning from high-concept children's programming to live variety shows, the Kroffts continued their collaboration with Douglass for audio sweetening purposes. Notable variety shows benefiting from Douglass's expertise include Donny and Marie, The Brady Bunch Hour, The Krofft Supershow, The Krofft Superstar Hour, Pink Lady and Jeff, Barbara Mandrell and the Mandrell Sisters, Pryor's Place, as well as their 1987 syndicated sitcom D.C. Follies.

As the practice of incorporating laugh tracks into Saturday morning television programming gained traction, Douglass expanded his repertoire to include a variety of children's laughter. Referred to as "kiddie laughs," these additions to his sound library were first utilized for audio enhancement in the 1973 syndicated television special, The World of Sid and Marty Krofft at the Hollywood Bowl, but by 1974, were heard on most Saturday morning kids' shows such as Uncle Croc's Block, Sigmund and the Sea Monsters, The Pink Panther Show, The Lost Saucer and Far Out Space Nuts.

Current Disney Channel-produced sitcoms and studio-created laugh tracks are primarily recorded in front of live audiences. Nickelodeon – Disney's top competitor – utilizes a laugh track for shows such as iCarly and Victorious since closing the original studio facilities fitted for live audience seating.

==== Making their own ====
By the onset of 1970, Charles Douglass's enterprise in laugh production had become increasingly profitable, prompting a decision to adjust the pricing structure for his services. However, the economic landscape of animated television programming differed significantly from that of sitcoms, characterized by tighter budgetary constraints. In response to the imperative of cost reduction, animation studios, notably Hanna-Barbera and Rankin-Bass, commenced a gradual disengagement from Douglass's services beginning in 1971.

While acknowledging the necessity of incorporating laughter tracks into their productions, these studios sought alternative methods to procure chuckles, employing diverse strategies to compile custom laugh tracks independently. The adoption of such proprietary laugh tracks elicited considerable controversy within contemporary discourse and among historical commentators, who raised questions regarding their authenticity and aesthetic congruence.

Nevertheless, amidst this shifting landscape, entities such as Filmation, DePatie-Freleng Enterprises, and Sid & Marty Krofft Television Productions maintained their collaborative alliances with Douglass, continuing to enlist his expertise for the augmentation of laughter in their Saturday-morning animated content.

==== Hanna-Barbera ====
Hanna-Barbera, a pioneering force in American cartoon production, marked a significant departure from its utilization of Douglass's services. The studio embraced the laugh track phenomenon, initially integrating it into their prime-time lineup comprising acclaimed shows such as The Flintstones, Top Cat, and The Jetsons. Subsequently, this practice extended to their daytime programming, notably with the introduction of The Banana Splits in 1968, drawing inspiration from Filmation's The Archies. Prior to 1971, successful series such as Scooby-Doo, Where Are You!, Harlem Globetrotters, and Josie and the Pussycats were characterized by the pervasive presence of a comprehensive laugh track.

A pivotal shift occurred at the outset of the 1971–72 season when Hanna-Barbera adopted a nuanced approach by implementing a limited laugh track mechanism employing the MacKenzie Repeater machine. This device, capable of cyclically playing up to five sound effects, facilitated the repetition of Douglass's distinctive laughs. The auditory composition featured a blend of mild chuckles and hearty belly-laughs, occasionally accentuated by a prominent female laugh, all augmented by a metallic resonance. With the exception of their eclectic variety shows, exemplified by The Hanna-Barbera Happy Hour, which briefly reverted to Douglass for additional enhancements, Hanna-Barbera standardized the use of this modified laugh track across the majority of their Saturday morning programming throughout the ensuing decade.

The impact of the Hanna-Barbera laugh track extended beyond episodic content to various television specials, notably those featured within The ABC Saturday Superstar Movie (ABC, 1972–74), functioning as a platform for the introduction of prospective comedic cartoon series. Occasionally, the studio employed techniques such as deceleration of the laugh track to heighten its comedic effect, as exemplified by the second season of The New Scooby-Doo Movies.

In 1972, Hanna-Barbera continued its experimentation with laugh track dynamics with the production of Wait Till Your Father Gets Home. Notably, this endeavor featured a modified laugh track distinguished by the inclusion of an additional belly laugh, a distinctive departure from their standard practice. Moreover, the laugh track in this instance underwent a deliberate reduction in speed during the production process, marking a singular occurrence within Hanna-Barbera's television repertoire.

Saturday morning shows featuring the Hanna-Barbera laugh track:

- Harlem Globetrotters (CBS, 1970–71; second season only)
- Help!... It's the Hair Bear Bunch! (CBS, 1971–72)
- The Pebbles and Bamm-Bamm Show (CBS, 1971–72)
- The Funky Phantom (ABC, 1971–72)
- The Roman Holidays (NBC, 1972)
- The Amazing Chan and the Chan Clan (CBS, 1972)
- The Flintstone Comedy Hour (CBS, 1972–73)
- Josie and the Pussycats in Outer Space (CBS, 1972–1974)
- The New Scooby-Doo Movies (CBS, 1972–74)
- Yogi's Gang (ABC, 1973)
- The Addams Family (CBS, 1973–74)
- Inch High, Private Eye (NBC, 1973–74)
- Jeannie (CBS, 1973–1975)
- Speed Buggy (CBS, 1973–1975)
- Goober and the Ghost Chasers (ABC, 1973–1975)
- Hong Kong Phooey (ABC, 1974)
- Partridge Family 2200 A.D. (CBS, 1974–75)
- Wheelie and the Chopper Bunch (NBC, 1974)
- The Great Grape Ape Show (ABC, 1975–1978)
- Jabberjaw (ABC, 1976–78)
- The Scooby-Doo Show (ABC, 1976–78)
- Dynomutt, Dog Wonder (ABC, 1976–77)
- Captain Caveman and the Teen Angels (ABC, 1977–1980)
- The Super Globetrotters (NBC, 1979–80)
- Scooby-Doo and Scrappy-Doo (ABC, 1979–80; first installment)
- Fred and Barney Meet the Shmoo (NBC, 1979–80)
- Fred and Barney Meet the Thing (NBC, 1979)
- The New Fred and Barney Show (NBC, 1979)
- Casper and the Angels (NBC, 1979)

Prime time specials/TV movies:

- Wait Till Your Father Gets Home (Syndicated, 1972–74)
- The Banana Splits in Hocus Pocus Park (ABC, 1972)
- The Adventures of Robin Hoodnik (ABC, 1972)
- A Flintstone Christmas (NBC, 1977)
- The Flintstones: Little Big League (NBC, 1978)
- The Flintstones Meet Rockula and Frankenstone (NBC, 1979)
- Scooby-Doo Goes Hollywood (ABC, 1979)
- Casper the Friendly Ghost: He Ain't Scary, He's Our Brother (NBC, 1979)
- Casper's First Christmas (NBC, 1979)
- The Flintstone Primetime Specials:
  - The Flintstones' New Neighbors (NBC, 1980)
  - The Flintstones: Fred's Final Fling (NBC, 1980)
  - The Flintstones: Wind-Up Wilma (NBC, 1981)
  - The Flintstones: Jogging Fever (NBC, 1981)

The Hanna-Barbera laugh track was discontinued after the 1981–82 television season.

In 1994, laugh track historian and re-recording mixer Paul Iverson commented on the legacy of the Hanna-Barbera track:

The Hanna Barbera laugh track did more to give laugh tracks a bad name than Douglass's work could ever have done. Using the same five or so laughs repeatedly for a decade does not go by unnoticed, no matter how young the viewer is.

Iverson added:

All it takes is watching an episode of Josie and the Pussycats alongside of Josie and the Pussycats in Outer Space and it is painfully obvious. It is a shame that a company as powerful as Hanna-Barbera – who, at its peak, practically owned Saturday mornings – thought so little of their audience by dubbing such an inferior laugh track for so long a period.

==== Rankin/Bass ====
Rankin/Bass, a notable animation studio renowned predominantly for their Christmas-themed specials, ventured into the realm of incorporating a laugh track into their Saturday morning animated series The Jackson 5ive in 1971. Following a model akin to that of Hanna-Barbera, Rankin/Bass adopted a methodology involving the extraction of laughter samples from Charles Douglass's extensive library, integrating them seamlessly into the program's audio track.

Initially, the laughter segments featured unmodulated bursts of sound, rendering their application somewhat discordant; instances of subdued humor prompted disproportionately robust reactions, often disrupting the natural flow of the narrative. Additionally, there were instances where laughter would spontaneously erupt mid-dialogue, further undermining the comedic effect.

However, the studio exhibited a commitment to refining their approach, evident in their second season endeavors. Through meticulous curation from Douglass's updated 1971–72 library, Rankin/Bass introduced more nuanced and contextually appropriate laughter segments. Notably, the improved selection was characterized by a greater degree of modulation, ensuring a more harmonious integration with the program's comedic timing. Sound engineering enhancements undertaken by Rankin/Bass further contributed to the optimization of the laugh track's synchronization with the animated sequences.

This enhanced methodology was not confined solely to The Jackson 5ive; concurrently, it was also applied to another Rankin/Bass production, The Osmonds (ABC, 1972). Diverging from the metallic tonality often associated with Hanna-Barbera's laugh track, Rankin/Bass endeavored to provide a more diverse array of laughter samples, thereby enriching the auditory experience for viewers.

Ultimately, the utilization of the laugh track by Rankin/Bass was temporally constrained, ceasing upon the conclusion of production for the aforementioned series. This decision marked the culmination of the studio's experimentation with this particular aspect of audio enhancement within the context of their television productions.

==== Jim Henson & Associates: The Muppet Show ====
The transition from the preliminary "silent" pilots to the official series of The Muppet Show marked a departure in comedic presentation. Incorporating a laugh track into the show's framework, albeit in a unique manner, distinguished it from its predecessors. Embracing the vaudevillian essence inherent in the variety program, viewers were not only treated to the antics of The Muppets but also to glimpses of the theater audience and their reactions.

Situated at the ATV Elstree Studios in England, the production team, under the guidance of Jim Henson, took measures to ensure a distinct auditory experience. Departing from the pre-recorded laughs of previous ventures, fresh chuckles and applause were meticulously curated for initial episodes, often sourced from the authentic reactions of cast and crew members to dailies. This novel approach not only lent an aura of authenticity but also cultivated a perception among viewers that the show was performed before a live audience. Despite this illusion, Henson acknowledged the impracticality of a live audience given the complexities of production, drawing parallels to similar challenges faced by other television productions. Henson noted that because of the series' vaudeville inspiration, having sounds of laughter was a necessity, but admits that it was not an easy task – "I look at some of the early shows, I'm really embarrassed by them. The sweetening got better later on, but it's always a difficult thing to do well, and to create the reality of the audience laughing."

The incorporation of a laugh track was not devoid of skepticism. Henson initially harbored reservations about its compatibility with the Muppet series, experimenting with both dry and laughter-enhanced versions of the pilot episode before conceding to its efficacy in amplifying comedic impact. The utilization of the laugh track became a distinctive feature of The Muppet Show, occasionally acknowledged within the narrative by characters breaking the fourth wall. In the fourth episode of the series, Kermit the Frog was asked by guest Ruth Buzzi if he felt a gag or routine was funny enough for the show, to which he turned to the camera and replied, "That's up to the laugh track." A season two episode featuring guest Steve Martin eschewed a laugh track altogether to support the concept that the show had been canceled that night in favor of auditioning new acts; the only audible laughs were those of the Muppet performers themselves.

Following the conclusion of The Muppet Show in 1981, subsequent Muppet projects saw a shift in production locales to the United States. This relocation was prompted by the cessation of the commercial ATV franchise in the UK and the disassociation of Lord Lew Grade, the show's financier, from television ventures. In the absence of Henson's original laugh track, subsequent projects turned to the expertise of Douglass for audience reactions, a tradition continued by his son Robert in subsequent Muppet endeavors, including special one-shot productions like The Fantastic Miss Piggy Show and The Muppets: A Celebration of 30 Years, and Muppets Tonight under Disney's auspices.

=== 1970s; Comeback of live audiences ===
The use of canned laughter peaked in the 1960s. However, some producers felt uncomfortable managing a sitcom that wasn't designed to be filmed in front of a live audience. One such example was Lucy veteran and Lucille Ball's ex-husband Desi Arnaz, who was more familiar with live sitcoms, as he had previously co-produced I Love Lucy. In mirroring Ball's successful comeback in The Lucy Show and The Dick Van Dyke Show, Arnaz produced The Mothers-in-Law (NBC, 1967–69), which was recorded in front of a live audience at Desilu Studios, but still hired Douglass to augment a sweetened track in post-production. A year later, The Good Guys (CBS, 1968–70) attempted to follow the same format. Although the first few episodes were filmed live, changes in production and location forced the crew to drop using multiple cameras for the remainder of the first season, using only a laugh track. This continued through season two until low ratings led to its cancellation in 1970.

Another show that started being taped partially in front of a live audience was George Schlatter's sketch comedy Rowan & Martin's Laugh-In (NBC, 1968–73), as well as its rival Hee-Haw (CBS, 1969–71, Syndication, 1971–93). Laugh-In became an anomaly among other comedic shows of the time in terms of its production methods; the 1967 pilot and the first few episodes of the first season featured a studio audience to react to the comedy routines of the ensemble on-stage, while pre-recorded shots mainly used Douglass' laugh track. Eventually, as marathon taping sessions of the show became increasingly expensive, Schlatter no longer required audiences to attend the tapings. Instead, cast relatives, the crew, people who still opted to attend, and the cast themselves, composed the studio audience, and the show relied more on Douglass' laugh track. Douglass would even simulate the reactions of the audience and diversify these chuckles with the track. He would continue to use this effect until the show's end in 1973, and for earlier seasons of Hee-Haw.

Other shows that continued bucking the trend against the single-camera method was Lucille's Ball next incarnate sitcom, Here's Lucy (CBS, 1968–74). Unlike other sitcoms of the era, Here's Lucy became one of the first sitcoms to embrace the social and cultural zeitgeist of the late 1960s, featuring guest stars ranging from the older guard of Hollywood to pop and rock musicians and athletes (e.g. Joe Namath, Donny Osmond, and Petula Clark). With focusing more on episodes revolving around a more urban setting, it ushered in what CBS had sought out to do by the turn of the 1970s.

The 1970s began with the decline of rural-based shows (such as The Beverly Hillbillies, Green Acres and Mayberry RFD) and the rise of socially conscious programming (such as All in the Family, M*A*S*H and Maude). What prompted CBS to revamp its new image was the success of the sitcom Here's Lucy and its new emerging hit, The Mary Tyler Moore Show (CBS, 1970–77). The series' pilot episode, "Love is All Around", had been initially filmed using the single-camera method. The results were not satisfactory to Moore or the producers, who then decided to shift to multiple cameras. Since the first several episodes were taped in late summer, the pilot's first taping was not received well due to bad insulation and poor audio. The second taping, however, provided better air conditioning and a better quality sound system to the stage. Critical reception thus improved, and the show used the multi-camera format thereafter, and became a major success during its seven-year run.

The resurgence of live audiences began to gradually take hold. More sitcoms began to veer away from the single-camera, movie-style format, reverting to the multi-camera format with a live studio audience providing real laughter, which producers found more pleasing because it had a better comic rhythm and helped them write better jokes. Creator Norman Lear's All in the Family (CBS, 1971–1979) followed suit in 1971. Videotaped live, Lear was more spontaneous; he wanted the studio audience to act like the performer, with hopes of the two developing a rapport with each other. Lear was not a fan of pretaped audiences, resulting in no laugh track being employed, not even during post-production when Lear could have had the luxury of sweetening any failed jokes (Lear relented somewhat in later seasons, and allowed Douglass to insert an occasional laugh). Lear's decision resulted in the show being a huge success, and ushered in the return of live audiences to the U.S. sitcom mainstream. To make his point clear, an announcement proclaimed over the closing credits each week that "All in the Family was recorded on tape before a live audience" or during the show's final seasons where live audiences no longer attended tapings of the show, "All in the Family was played to a studio audience for live responses."

Jack Klugman and Tony Randall expressed displeasure during the first season of The Odd Couple (ABC, 1970–75), which used a laugh track without a live audience. Co-creator/executive producer Garry Marshall also disliked utilizing a laugh track, and theatre veteran Randall, in particular, resented the process of having to wait several seconds between punchlines in order to allot enough space for the laugh track to be inserted. The production team experimented with omitting the laugh track altogether with the episode "Oscar's New Life"; the episode aired without a laugh track (laughter was subsequently added for syndication in order to maintain continuity). ABC relented by the second season, with The Odd Couple being filmed with three cameras (vs. a single camera the previous season) and performed like a stage play in front of a studio audience. The change also required a new, larger set to be constructed within a theatre. With a live audience present, Randall and Klugman enjoyed the spontaneity that came with it; any missed or blown lines went by without stopping (they could always be re-filmed during post-production). In addition, it gave the show a certain edge that was seen as missing in the first season, although actors had to deliver lines louder, since they were on a larger sound stage as opposed to a quiet studio with only minimal crew present. Klugman later commented, "We spent three days rehearsing the show. We sat around a table the first day. We tore the script apart. We took out all the jokes and put in character. The only reason we leave in any jokes is for the rotten canned laughter. I hated it. I watch the shows at home, I see Oscar come in and he says, 'Hi,' and there is the laughter. 'Hey,' I think, 'what the hell did I do?' I hate it; it insults the audience."

The sitcom Happy Days (ABC, 1974–84) mirrored The Odd Couple scenario as well. Its first two seasons used only a laugh track, and by third season, shifted over to a live audience.

The shows were not entirely live, however. With the exception of All in the Family, sweetening was still a necessity during post-production in order to bridge any gaps in audience reactions. Television/laugh track historian Ben Glenn II observed a taping of the sitcom Alice (CBS, 1976–85) and noted the need for sweetening: "The actors kept blowing their lines. Of course, by the third or fourth take, the joke was no longer funny. A Douglass laugh was inserted into the final broadcast version to compensate."

Some producers, like James Komack, however, followed Lear's approach. Komack, who was involved in the short-lived sitcom Hennesey starring Jackie Cooper, was a longtime critic of the Douglass laugh track, believing the laughs were too predictable and could hinder the effect of the sitcom's humor. Komack instead employed music to counteract the sweetened laughs. He experimented with this technique in The Courtship of Eddie's Father (ABC, 1969–72), which featured a subdued laugh track. Multi-camera shows produced by Komack, such as Chico and the Man (NBC, 1974–78) and Welcome Back, Kotter (ABC, 1975–79), utilized background music cues during scene transitions (obvious locations for sweetening) and made sure that Douglass's laugh track was used infrequently during post-production. Komack later commented, "If you ever try to do a show without a laugh track, you'll see a huge difference...[I]t flattens. The only way to get away from a laugh track is to use music, which can indicate when something is funny." On sweetening, he continued, "Then it's determined by the taste of the producers – by the morality of the producers...[A]fter a while, you learn that it is valueless. In the extremes, people are going to hear it and say, 'Why are they laughing?' and they'll turn off your program."

In addition to The Odd Couple, The Mary Tyler Moore Show and Happy Days, other live sitcoms that were sweetened by Douglass (many of which also sweetened by Pratt by the end of the 1970s) were The Paul Lynde Show (ABC, 1972–73), The Bob Newhart Show (CBS, 1972–78), Maude (CBS, 1972–78), Rhoda (CBS, 1974–78), Barney Miller (ABC, 1975–82), Laverne and Shirley (ABC, 1976–83), Soap (ABC, 1977–81), The Comedy Shop (Syndication, 1978–81), Mork & Mindy (ABC, 1978–82), Taxi (ABC, 1978–82; NBC, 1982–83), Cheers (NBC, 1982–93) and its spinoff Frasier (NBC, 1993–2004).

Variety shows that became prominent during the 1970s, such as The Carol Burnett Show, The Flip Wilson Show and The Dean Martin Show (as well as The Dean Martin Celebrity Roast succeeding afterwards) also continued to use Douglass's sweetening for any less appealing jokes performed during sketches.

Game shows were sweetened during the 1970s and early 1980s, often played when a contestant or the host says something considered to be funny and only a small reaction comes from the live audience. Douglass's laugh track was especially heard in Chuck Barris's game shows (i.e. The Gong Show and The Newlywed Game), whose shows were designed mainly to entertain the audience; the "prizes" were often rudimentary or derisive. Game shows that were produced at CBS Television City and NBC Studios Burbank were also sweetened, often to intensify audience reactions, including shows like Press Your Luck (used during "Whammy" segments). During a typical game show's closing credits, the show used canned cheers and applause noises to sweeten the live studio audience applause noises that viewers did not hear during the credits. This was common on daytime game shows on CBS and NBC and some syndicated game shows from the 1970s through the 1990s. Game shows taped at NBC Studios Burbank used three different applause tracks for sweetening: one with a smaller crowd, one with a medium crowd, and one with a large crowd with a cheerful male audience member in the background. However, many kids' game shows, most ABC game shows, and most Mark Goodson-Bill Todman productions, such as The Price Is Right, Match Game and Family Feud were taped with a live audience present, though sweetening was used on rare occasions.

There were still some producers who either still did not trust a live audience, produced a show that was too complex for an audience to be present, favored the single-camera method, or could not afford to screen it live to an audience for responses. In these cases, Douglass orchestrated the laugh track from scratch. Sitcoms like The Brady Bunch, The Partridge Family and M*A*S*H utilized the single-camera method for their entire run. Several hour-long comedy dramas, like The Love Boat and Eight Is Enough, used only a laugh track.

In the intervening years beginning with live film, progressing through videotape and onto studio-filmed productions with no live audience back to live-on-tape, Douglass had gone from merely enhancing or tweaking a soundtrack, to literally customizing entire audience reactions to each performance and back again to enhancing and tweaking performances recorded with live audiences.

=== Competition and decline ===
During the zenith of the 1970s era in U.S. television, Charles Douglass's ascendancy in the domain of laugh track provision faced a notable challenge by 1977, as emerging competitors began offering alternatives to Douglass's signature laugh sequences. Foremost among these challengers was Carroll Pratt, a protégé of Douglass and accomplished sound engineer in his own right, who embarked on establishing his venture, Sound One.

Having apprenticed under Douglass since the early 1960s, Pratt and his brother discerned that Douglass's methodologies lagged behind technological advancements, with discernible degradation in the quality of Douglass's laugh tracks. Pratt noted an audible deterioration in sound quality attributable to the wear and tear on Douglass's tape library, compounded by evolving audience sensibilities towards sitcom humor, which necessitated a more nuanced and subdued approach to laughter augmentation.

Cognizant of these shifting dynamics, Pratt opted to diverge from Douglass's paradigm, devising a more user-friendly and technically advanced "laff box" utilizing cassette tape technology, in contrast to Douglass's somewhat antiquated reel-to-reel apparatus. Moreover, Pratt's pioneering adoption of stereo recordings, synchronized with the emergence of stereophonic television broadcasts, afforded a perceptible improvement in audio fidelity, particularly in comparison to Douglass's efforts to retrofit mono recordings into a stereo format.

Pratt's laugh track innovations introduced a departure from Douglass's distinctive laughter sequences, offering a more diverse and naturalistic sonic palette. While retaining elements of recognizable laughter, Pratt's compositions exhibited a greater subtlety and restraint, eschewing the overt familiarity associated with Douglass's ubiquitous laugh tracks. This shift resonated with certain sitcom productions, such as M*A*S*H and The Love Boat, which gravitated towards Pratt's offerings, particularly given their tonal compatibility with more dramatic narratives.

By the decade's denouement, Pratt's ascendancy supplanted Douglass's hegemony, evidenced by the widespread adoption of Pratt's laugh tracks across a spectrum of live and single-camera sitcoms (Laverne and Shirley, Happy Days, Eight Is Enough, including productions by MTM Enterprises (WKRP in Cincinnati (CBS, 1978–82), Newhart (CBS, 1982–90)). Douglass, compelled to adapt to the evolving landscape, embarked on a revitalization effort, refining his laugh track library to incorporate fresher compositions while preserving vestiges of his trademark guffaws. However, the reception to Douglass's revamped offerings was mixed, underscoring Pratt's hegemony in an increasingly competitive market.

This epochal shift in laugh track provision coincided with broader transformations within the television landscape, notably marked by the advent of single-camera comedies, championed by entities like HBO, which eschewed the traditional laugh track in favor of a more naturalistic audiovisual aesthetic. Single-camera comedies such as Dream On and The Larry Sanders Show were permitted to run without laugh tracks, and won critical praise for doing so. Concurrently, animated shows followed suit, abandoning laugh tracks altogether, save for occasional parodic usage. Animated shows that used to employ a laugh track, such as Scooby-Doo, had dismissed the laugh track altogether by the 1990s. However, sitcoms made by It's a Laugh Productions, such as That's So Raven, use laugh tracks.

The practice of sweetening live awards shows persisted, albeit undergoing technological refinements to ensure seamless integration with live broadcasts.

In the contemporary milieu, the resurgence of multicamera sitcoms like Holliston on platforms such as Fearnet has witnessed a revival of laugh track utilization, underscoring the enduring appeal and nostalgic resonance of this television tradition. However, the prevailing trend towards single-camera productions, coupled with evolving audience preferences, portends continued diversification in audiovisual storytelling modalities within the television lands.

=== Controversy, bucking the trend ===
The practice of simulating an audience reaction was controversial from the beginning. A silent minority of producers despised the idea of a prerecorded audience reaction. Douglass was aware that his "laff box" was maligned by critics and actors, but also knew that the use of a laugh track became standard practice. Leading industry experts reasoned that laugh tracks were a necessary evil in prime time television: without the canned laughter, a show was doomed to fail. It was believed that in the absence of any sort of audience reaction, American viewers could not differentiate between a comedy or drama. That did not stop several from forgoing the laugh track entirely:

- Former child star Jackie Cooper believed that the laugh track was false. Cooper's comedy/drama Hennesey (CBS, 1959–62) was cancelled in 1962 after three seasons. For its first two seasons, the show used only a mild laugh track; by the third and final season, the chuckles were eliminated completely. Cooper later commented that "we're manufacturing a reaction to our own creation, yet we'll never know if people out there are really laughing." Cooper concluded by saying, "It's a put-on all the time."
- In September 1964, the comedy/drama Kentucky Jones (NBC, 1964–65), starring Dennis Weaver, tried to eliminate laughs, simulated or live. After only five episodes and slumping ratings, Douglass was recruited to add the laugh track. Kentucky Jones was cancelled the following April.
- Ross Bagdasarian Sr., creator of the Alvin and the Chipmunks franchise, outright refused to utilize a laugh track when production began on The Alvin Show (CBS, 1961–62) in 1961. Bagdasarian's reasoning was if the show was funny, the viewers would laugh without being prompted. The Alvin Show was cancelled after a single season.
- Peanuts creator Charles M. Schulz refused to employ a laugh track during the production of the holiday favorite A Charlie Brown Christmas (CBS, 1965). Like Bagdasarian, Schulz maintained that the audience should be able to enjoy the show at their own pace, without being cued when to laugh. When CBS executives saw the final product, they were horrified and believed the special would be a flop (CBS did create a version of the show with the laugh track added, just in case Schulz changed his mind; this version remains unavailable). When the special first aired on December 9, 1965, it was a surprise critical and commercial hit. As a result of this success, all subsequent Peanuts specials aired with no laugh track present.
- Rocky and His Friends (ABC, 1959–61; NBC, 1961–64 as The Bullwinkle Show) was originally broadcast with a laugh track, against the wishes of creators Jay Ward and Bill Scott, who disputed the laugh track with ABC; given the rapid-fire pace of the show's humor, the laugh track slowed the timing and at times interrupted dialogue. After getting support from sponsor General Mills, Ward and Scott convinced ABC, and the laugh track ended after its fourth episode; while current syndicated prints of these episodes still retain the laugh track, it has been subsequently removed from the DVD release.
- The musical sitcom The Monkees (NBC, 1966–68) featured a laugh track throughout its first season and several episodes of the second. Midway through Season 2, the Monkees band members insisted the show eliminate the laugh track, believing their viewers were intelligent enough to know where the jokes were. NBC, already annoyed by the rock group wanting too much control over their show, cancelled The Monkees after the conclusion of its second season, citing the removal of the laugh track as a significant factor. Peter Tork commented in 2013 that "we didn't want it from the beginning, but NBC insisted. I thought it was a stroke of genius when it was eliminated in the second season."
- When discussing the making of the sitcom Get Smart (NBC, 1965–69, CBS, 1969–70) in 2003, television producer and screenwriter Leonard B. Stern initially opposed to employing a laugh track for the sitcom, given its somewhat violent nature, calling it "offensive." Stern and Mel Brooks relented and the earlier seasons contained a more-or-less modulated track. The laugh track got steadily more invasive as the show increasingly got campier in the later seasons. Comedian Don Adams, who played Maxwell Smart on Get Smart, reportedly hated the laugh track, citing it for refusing to watch the show in reruns. At a reunion seminar honoring the show in 2003, Adams stated, "it offended me in the pilot, the laugh track. I would come in a room and say 'Hello, 99!' and the guy would push the goddamn button! What the hell is funny about 'Hello!'?" In a 1995 Entertainment Weekly interview when discussing the legacy of the show, Adams firmly stated the laugh track was unnecessary. Conversely in the same interview, actress Barbara Feldon, who played Agent 99, was more lenient, saying "You need a laugh track. Laughter inspires laughter."
- Bill Cosby's first sitcom, The Bill Cosby Show (NBC, 1969–71) was produced without a laugh track at the insistence of Cosby. He stated that his opposition to NBC's desire to add a laugh track led to the show's cancellation after two seasons.
- Andy Griffith initially resisted the inclusion of a laugh track on The Andy Griffith Show. Co-star Don Knotts had previously been a member of the ensemble cast of The Steve Allen Show when it transitioned from a live audience to a laugh track in its fourth season. Knotts felt the artificial audience reaction contributed to the show's demise – a sentiment that influenced Griffith's opinion. Instead of a laugh track, Griffith insisted on screening completed episodes in front of an audience, recording their reaction, and inserting that into the show's soundtrack (a practice that became more commonplace for television comedies in years to come). The earliest episodes include these custom audience reactions; however, Griffith's experiment was too costly, and the network insisted on a Douglass laugh track. Griffith eventually compromised on the condition that it be utilized sparingly.
- Larry Gelbart, co-creator of M*A*S*H (CBS, 1972–83), initially wanted the show to air without a laugh track ("Just like the actual Korean War", he remarked dryly). Though CBS initially rejected the idea, a compromise was reached that allowed Gelbart and co-producer Gene Reynolds to omit the laugh track during operating room scenes if they wished. "We told the network that under no circumstances would we ever can laughter during an OR scene when the doctors were working," said Gelbart in 1998. "It's hard to imagine that 300 people were in there laughing at somebody's guts being sewn up." Seasons 1–5 utilized Douglass's more invasive laugh track; Carroll Pratt's quieter laugh track was employed for Seasons 6–11 when the series shifted from sitcom to comedy drama with the departure of Gelbart and Reynolds. Several episodes ("O.R.", "The Bus", ""Quo Vadis, Captain Chandler?", "The Interview", "Point of View" and "Dreams" among them) omitted the laugh track; as did almost all of Season 11, including the 135-minute series finale, "Goodbye, Farewell and Amen". The laugh track is also omitted from some international and syndicated airings of the show; on one occasion during an airing in the UK, the laugh track was accidentally left on, and viewers expressed their displeasure, an apology from the network for the "technical difficulty" was later released. The DVD releases, meanwhile, give the viewer a choice of watching every episode with or without the laugh tracks (though the French and Spanish track do not have this option). UK DVD critics speak poorly of the laugh track, stating "canned laughter is intrusive at the best of times, but with a programme like M*A*S*H, it's downright unbearable." "They're a lie," said Gelbart in a 1992 interview. "You're telling an engineer when to push a button to produce a laugh from people who don't exist. It's just so dishonest. The biggest shows when we were on the air were All in the Family and The Mary Tyler Moore Show both of which were taped before a live studio audience where laughter made sense," continued Gelbart. "But our show was a film show – supposedly shot in the middle of Korea. So the question I always asked the network was, 'Who are these laughing people? Where did they come from?'" Gelbart persuaded CBS to test the show in private screenings with and without the laugh track. The results showed no measurable difference in the audience's enjoyment. "So you know what they said?" Gelbart said. "'Since there's no difference, let's leave it alone!' The people who defend laugh tracks have no sense of humor." Gelbart summed up the situation by saying, "I always thought it cheapened the show. The network got their way. They were paying for dinner."
- The sitcom Police Squad!, which was a parody of police procedurals, did not utilize a laugh track in any of its six episodes. The decision not to incorporate one was at the behest of its creators, the trio of Zucker-Abrahams-Zucker, since most of the humor of the program was derived from events that occurred either in the foreground or in the background of various scenes.
- Another satirical police sitcom, Sledge Hammer! (ABC, 1986–88), utilized a laugh track for the first 13 episodes of its first season, of which creator Alan Spencer did not approve. After months of fighting with ABC, Spencer was able to cease adding laughter beginning with episode 14, "State of Sledge".
- The sitcom Dinosaurs (ABC, 1991–94) initially featured a laugh track. At the insistence of co-producers Brian Henson and Michael Jacobs, it was eventually dropped as the show grew in popularity.
- Sports Night (ABC, 1998–2000) premiered with a laugh track, against the wishes of show creator Aaron Sorkin, but the laugh track became more subtle as the season progressed and was completely removed at the start of the second season. In some cases, a laugh track was needed to maintain continuity, as portions of each episode were filmed in front of a live audience, while the remainder were filmed without an audience present.
- The 2020 revival of Saved by the Bell is a single-camera sitcom that dropped the live audience and laugh track altogether, which is a major difference from the original series.

=== Persistence in modern sitcoms ===
Some people, including creators of well-known comedies and fans of documentary-style sitcoms, criticize laugh tracks. However, laugh tracks are still standard on television. Many sitcoms use them, with seven multi-camera sitcoms using laugh tracks on broadcast television, compared to five single-camera sitcoms without them. Laugh tracks can come from a live studio audience, the Laff Box (which has 320 different laughs recorded in the 1950s), or digital sound files. They remain popular because they appeal to audiences in a way that encourages laughter.

== Outside the U.S. ==
=== United Kingdom ===
In the second half of the 20th century, most sitcoms in the United Kingdom were taped before live audiences to provide natural laughter. Scenes recorded outdoors, traditionally recorded in advance of studio work, are played back to the studio audience, and their laughter is recorded for the broadcast episode (occasionally, entire shows have been recorded in this fashion, for example, the later series of Last of the Summer Wine and Keeping Up Appearances).

One notable exception to the use of a live audience was Thames Television's The Kenny Everett Video Show, whose laugh track consisted of spontaneous reactions to sketches from the studio production crew. This technique was maintained throughout its four-year run, even as the show moved to larger studio facilities and its emphasis switched from music to comedy. Everett's later series for the BBC (The Kenny Everett Television Show) were recorded in front of live studio audiences.

In the early 1980s it was BBC policy that comedy programmes be broadcast with a laugh track, though producers did not always agree this suited their programmes. As a result, a laugh track for The Hitchhiker's Guide to the Galaxy was recorded for the first episode, but dropped before transmission. The League of Gentlemen was originally broadcast with a laugh track, but this was dropped after the programme's second series.

The pilot episode of the satirical series Spitting Image was also broadcast with a laugh track, apparently at the insistence of Central Television. This idea was dropped as the show's producers felt that the show worked better without one. Some later editions, in 1992 (Election Special) and 1993 (two episodes) did use a laughter track, as these were performed live in front of a studio audience and included a spoof Question Time.

Most episodes of Only Fools and Horses feature a studio audience; the exceptions, which featured no laughter at all, were all Christmas specials, "To Hull and Back", "A Royal Flush" and the second part of "Miami Twice". For their DVD releases, "A Royal Flush" (which was edited to remove over 20 minutes of footage) had an added laughter track, as did the second part of "Miami Twice" (which was merged with the first part to make Miami Twice: The Movie).

Beginning in the late 1990s, comedies such as The Royle Family and The Office pioneered a cinéma vérité style without audience laughter. This largely continued into 21st century sitcoms. Although Green Wing does not feature audience laughter, partly because of its surreal nature, it does feature unusual lazzi techniques, where the film of the episode is slowed down immediately following a joke. Mrs Brown's Boys and Still Open All Hours are notable reversions to the older format with a studio audience.

=== Canada ===
In the landscape of contemporary Canadian television comedies, the prevalent trend eschews the incorporation of a laugh track. However, notable exceptions exist, exemplified by select programs such as the sitcom Maniac Mansion (1990–1993) and the children's program The Hilarious House of Frightenstein (1971), which, despite originating from Canada without a laugh track, saw the addition of such an element for U.S. broadcasts.

The evolution of laugh track utilization within Canadian television is further exemplified by the trajectory of the children's sketch comedy series You Can't Do That on Television (1979–90). Initially absent during its inaugural season as a locally televised program, the introduction of a laugh track coincided with its transition to Canadian network broadcasting under the title Whatever Turns You On. This laugh track, predominantly composed of children's laughter with intermittent inclusion of adult reactions, underscored the unique nature of the show. However, the consistency and effectiveness of the laugh track exhibited variation across seasons.

Noteworthy fluctuations in laugh track implementation and quality are discernible throughout the series' run. The 1981 episodes stand out for their diverse array of laughter samples, contributing to an authentic auditory experience. In contrast, the 1982 season, coinciding with the series' debut on the U.S. cable channel Nickelodeon, witnessed a reduction in the variety of laughs utilized. Furthermore, the introduction of Carroll Pratt's titter track, reminiscent of laugh tracks employed in popular U.S. sitcoms such as Happy Days and What's Happening!!, introduced a distinct tonal shift.

Subsequent adjustments in laugh track composition aimed to mitigate issues of repetition and enhance auditory diversity. Notably, the latter half of the 1982 season saw a blend of different laughter samples, alongside the incorporation of the titter track. However, the quality of the laugh track experienced fluctuations, evident in the notably subdued and inadequately edited tracks of 1983.

Efforts to rectify these deficiencies culminated in improvements by 1984, with laughter tracks resembling those utilized in the 1982 season, albeit without the inclusion of the titter track. Notably, the introduction of a new children's laugh track in 1986, characterized by distinctly younger laughter samples, aimed to resonate with the target demographic of the series.

Upon its revival in 1989, the series adopted a hybrid approach, utilizing laugh tracks from both the 1981 and 1986 iterations, underscoring the continued evolution and adaptation of laugh track aesthetics within the context of Canadian television production.

=== China ===
I Love My Family, the first multi-camera sitcom in mainland China, used a live studio audience. Some single-camera comedies, such as iPartment, used a laugh track.

Laugh tracks are commonly used in variety shows for comic effect. Examples include Super Sunday, Kangxi Lai Le, Variety Big Brother and Home Run.

=== Latin America ===
Several Latin American countries like Argentina replace the laugh track with a crew of off-screen people paid specifically to laugh on command whenever the comedic situation merits a laugh. Known as reidores ("laughers"), a senior laugher signals all the others when to laugh. In others like Mexico, comedies without audience reactions were openly stated to have no laugh track because they respected their audience, most notably Chespirito programs like El Chapulín Colorado and El Chavo del Ocho, with the announcer in the starting credits stating "Por una cuestión de respeto al público este programa no contiene risas grabadas" ("As a form of respect towards the audience, this show does not features canned laughs.").

=== France ===
In the realm of French television comedy, the prevalent convention eschews the inclusion of laugh tracks. However, a notable departure from this trend occurred within the productions of AB Productions, helmed by Jean-Luc Azoulay, notably exemplified by series such as Hélène et les Garçons and its subsequent spin-offs. These interconnected series, characterized by their adherence to sitcom conventions, including a duration of approximately twenty minutes and a predominantly single-camera setup, eschewed the presence of a studio audience. The absence of live audience participation stemmed from the exigencies of production, characterized by stringent editing schedules and truncated principal photography sessions, rendering the integration of genuine audience laughter unfeasible.

Critiques levied against these productions centered on various aspects, ranging from deficiencies in direction and performances to the employment of non-professional actors. Moreover, the attempt to emulate American television series formats, combining elements of sitcoms, soap operas, and teen dramas, elicited considerable criticism, with particular attention directed towards the perceived overreliance on canned laughter. This emulation was viewed as diluting the authenticity and cultural specificity of French television comedy, instead favoring a formulaic approach heavily influenced by transatlantic norms.

== Effects ==
In order to gauge the continued relevance of Douglass's laugh track, a study was published in 1974 in the Journal of Personality and Social Psychology that concluded people were still more likely to laugh at jokes that were followed by canned laughter. That Girl co-creator Sam Denoff commented in 1978 that "laughter is social. It's easier to laugh when you're with people." Denoff added "in a movie theatre, you don't need a laugh track, but at home, watching TV, you're probably alone or with just a few others."

Dartmouth College psychology professor Bill Kelley gauged the necessity of the laugh track, particularly on U.S. sitcoms. He stated "we're much more likely to laugh at something funny in the presence of other people." Kelley's research compared students' reactions to an episode of Seinfeld, which utilizes a laugh track, to those watching The Simpsons, which does not. Brain scans suggested that viewers found the same things funny and the same regions of their brain lit up whether or not they heard others laughing. Despite this, Kelley still found value in the laugh track. "When done well," Kelley commented, "they can give people pointers about what's funny and help them along. But when done poorly, you notice a laugh track and it seems unnatural and out of place."

A 2017 study by Andreas M. Baranowski and colleagues at University of Mainz further explored the effects of laugh tracks, expanding the research to include other audience reactions such as canned screaming. The researchers conducted three experiments with a total of 110 participants, comparing the influence of laugh tracks, scream tracks, and no audience sound on the perception of comedy, horror, and neutral film scenes. Their findings reinforced prior studies, showing that laugh tracks increased amusement, particularly for material that was only mildly funny. However, unlike laugh tracks, canned scream tracks did not significantly heighten fear responses. When real confederates provided audience reactions, the effects were even stronger, demonstrating that social cues—whether live or recorded—play a significant role in shaping emotional reactions to media. The study also found that congruent audience reactions enhanced viewer immersion, with comedies being most engaging when accompanied by laughter and horror films most immersive when paired with screams. These results suggest that audience reactions, even artificial ones, can alter a viewer’s perception and emotional engagement with media content.

== Legacy and support ==
Since its inception, the idea of prerecorded laughter has had its share of supporters as well as detractors.

Si Rose, executive producer for Sid and Marty Krofft, convinced the Kroffts to use a laugh track on their puppet shows, such as H.R. Pufnstuf, The Bugaloos and Sigmund and the Sea Monsters. Rose stated:

The laugh track was a big debate, they [the Kroffts] said they didn't want to do it, but with my experience with night-timers, night-time started using laugh tracks, and it becomes a staple, because the viewer watches the program and there's a big laugh every time because of the laugh track, and then when you see a show that's funny and there's no laugh because of no laugh track, it becomes a handicap, so I convinced them of that. Good or bad.

In 2000, Sid Krofft commented, "We were sort of against that [the laugh track], but Si Rose – being in sitcoms – he felt that when the show was put together that the children would not know when to laugh." Marty Krofft added:

the bottom line – it's sad – you gotta tell them when it's funny. And the laugh track, [Rose] was right. It was necessary, as much as we were always looking to have a real laugh track, a real audience. In comedies, if you don't have them, you're in big trouble, because if you don't hear a laugh track, it's not funny. And that's the way the audience [at home] was programmed to view these shows.

When discussing the show's production techniques for The Bugaloos DVD commentary track in 2006, British series stars Caroline Ellis and John Philpott addressed the laugh track, which at that time was uncharacteristic and often scorned in the United Kingdom. "I was never one for the American canned laughter, because sometimes it's too much," said Ellis. She added, however, that it does help in creating "the atmosphere for the reaction." Philpott added that, unlike their UK counterparts, US viewing audiences at the time had become accustomed to hearing laughter, saying, "I think you find yourself genuinely laughing more if you are prompted to laugh along with the canned laughter." When viewing the Kroffts' H.R. Pufnstuf for the first time, Brady Bunch star Susan Olsen described the laugh track as "overbearing," saying, "I remember being eight years old...and just thinking, 'Will they get rid of that awful canned laughter?!'" Olsen added that recreational drug use was necessary to enjoy the silliness of the program, saying, "I never tried combining mind-altering substances and Krofft entertainment; I'm afraid the laugh track would send me on a bad trip."

In a 2007 interview, Filmation producer/founder Lou Scheimer praised the laugh track for its usage on The Archie Show. "Why did we use a laugh track?" Scheimer asked. "Because it makes the audience want to laugh with all the other people who are watching [at home]. And you felt like [you were] part of the show than just [being] an observer." Scheimer confirmed that The Archie Show was the first Saturday morning cartoon to utilize a laugh track.

Television and laugh track historian Ben Glenn, II, commented that the laugh tracks currently used are radically different from the "carefree" quality of the laughter of past:

Today's sitcoms are based mostly on witty reparté and no longer rely on outlandish situations or sight gags, such as you would see in an episode of Mister Ed, The Munsters or Bewitched, and today's muted laughs reflect that. Generally, laughs are now much less aggressive and more subdued; you no longer hear unbridled belly laughs or guffaws. It's 'intelligent' laughter – more genteel, more sophisticated. But definitely not as much fun. There was an optimism and carefree quality in those old laugh tracks. Today, the reactions are largely "droll" just the way in which they sound. In the past, if the audience was really having a good time, it shone through. Audience members seemed less self-conscious and they felt free to laugh as loudly as they wanted. Maybe that's a reflection of contemporary culture. In the 1950s, the laughs were generally buoyant and uproarious, although somewhat generic, because Douglass hadn’t yet refined his structured laugh technique. In the 60s, however, you could hear more individual responses – chortles, cackles from both men and women. The reactions were much more orderly and organized. I can actually tell you the exact year that a show was produced, just by listening to its laugh track."

Several months after Douglass's death in 2003, his son Bob commented on the pros and cons of his father's invention:

On some of the shows it was abused. They wanted to keep adding more and more laughs, and it would go way overboard. They thought it was going to be funnier, and it wasn't. A lot of producers would have the laughter almost louder than the dialogue, and that ruins it. It's a tool. Like music is, like sound effects, like dialogue. It's everything combined together to make a show flow along and have a nice pace to it. It's all timing. With skill, and a little luck, a well-executed laugh track can be a work of art contributing to a larger work of art. We've been around a long time, and it fills a need in the industry. We don't expect to be the main ingredient in a show. It's just part of the puzzle that puts together the shows that make for great television.

Carroll Pratt confirmed Douglass's comments in a June 2002 interview with the Archive of American Television, saying that producers regularly wanted louder, longer laughs:

In the beginning, it was terrible! It got to be a point where the more you laugh, the louder you laugh, the funnier the joke was. And that wasn't so. And that's why the press, the media, the public in general came down on laughs at all: it was just too much. And there are still shows that are required to do that, but now less is better. I think less in enthusiasm, perhaps, but not less in volume. It's been tried by some producers and some shows to lessen the volume until it was a whisper and that becomes a bigger irritation than having it too loud. A joke is a joke, but I've noticed that the public is more sophisticated now. They don't seem to be hand-fed as they were in the early days. Now, we take the light approach as far as trying to drive home a joke with audience reaction. I think that it's okay to back off a little bit especially on a live-audience show. Go with the show and let them tell you.

Few re-recording mixers have carried on the "laff box" tradition. In addition to Bob Douglass, Los Angeles-based mixers Bob La Masney, and Sound One's Jack Donato and John Bickelhaupt currently specialize in audience sweetening. While modern digital machines are not as cumbersome as Douglass's original machinery, Bickelhaupt confirmed they "are pretty anonymous, with [unlabeled] knobs and buttons. We like to remain kind of mysterious – the man-behind-the-curtain thing. We don't really like to talk about it too much." Bickelhaupt added that "most of the time, what we're doing isn't re-creating a studio audience; the audience laughter is already there. But in editing, when sections of the show are taken out, when they take out lines to make the show fit a time slot – we have to cover the bridge between one laugh and another by using the laugh machine." In reference to the quiet laugh track employed on How I Met Your Mother, Bickelhaupt commented that producers are increasingly "shying away from that big, full audience – the raucous sound that was more commonplace in the 70s, 80s, and 90s. They want a more subtle track." Bickelhaupt concluded, "I have a great job. When you sit and work on comedy all day, you can't possibly get depressed. When people ask me what I do for a living, I tell them, 'I laugh.'"

Steven Levitan, creator of Just Shoot Me! (a multi-camera series that used live and taped audience reactions) and co-creator of Modern Family (which does not utilize live or recorded audience laughter as a single-camera series), commented, "When used properly, the laugh guy's job is to smooth out the soundtrack – nothing more." Phil Rosenthal confirmed that he "rarely manipulated the laughs" on Everybody Loves Raymond. "I worked on shows in the past where the 'sweetener' was ladled on with a heavy hand, mainly because there were hardly any laughs from the living. The executive producers would say, 'Don't worry – you know who will love that joke? Mr. Sweet man.'" Bickelhaupt confirmed this observation, admitting there are many occasions he has created all audience responses. Conversely, Lloyd J. Schwartz, son of Brady Bunch creator Sherwood Schwartz, admitted in his book, Brady, Brady, Brady, that the laugh track in his directorial debut of The Brady Bunch (S4E23 "Room at the Top") was "significantly louder than any of the other [Brady Bunch] episodes." Schwartz added, "I'm a little embarrassed about it now, but I wanted to make sure that the manufactured audience got all the jokes I directed."

Karal Ann Marling, professor of American studies and art history at the University of Minnesota, voiced concerns about Douglass's invention:

Most critics think that the laugh track is the worst thing that ever happened to the medium, because it treats the audience as though they were sheep who need to be told when something is funny – even if, in fact, it's not very funny. It's probably changed comedy, particularly situation comedy. I mean, anything can be passed off as hilariously funny, at least for the first two or three go-rounds, if you've got people laughing like maniacs in the background. It's as though during a drama show, suddenly a voice in the background goes, "Ooohh, this is scary!" or "Oh, he looks guilty!" It seems like the next logical step if you're going to have laugh tracks. For proof of the intelligent power of a non-laugh track show, look no further than The Simpsons. It's wonderfully written. They work for their laughs. And audiences sit there and wet their pants. That's a great example of why not to have a laugh track. Let me be the laugh track."

Marling added she was concerned more about canned laughter as a symptom of a larger social willingness to accept things uncritically, which included political messages as well as commercial messages. "It's a kind of decline in American feistiness and an ability to think for yourself," she said. "It certainly is embedded, but that doesn't make it a good thing. There are a lot of things that we do every day of the week that aren't good things. And this is one of them."

== See also ==
- Artificial crowd noise
- Claque
- Noddies
- Studio audience
