= The Jerk, Too =

1984 television film directed by Michael Schultz

- Genre: Comedy
- Written by: Steve Martin (characters); Carl Gottlieb (characters); Ziggy Steinberg; Rocco Urbisci
- Directed by: Michael Schultz
- Starring: Mark Blankfield; Stacey Nelkin; Ray Walston
- Music by: Frank Denson; Phil Galdston; John Sebastian
- Country of origin: United States
- Original language: English

Production
- Executive producer: Steve Martin
- Producer: Ziggy Steinberg
- Cinematography: Joseph F. Biroc
- Editors: Jack Gleason; Harry Keramidas
- Running time: 95 minutes
- Production companies: 40 Share Productions, Inc. Universal Television

Original release
- Network: NBC
- Release: January 6, 1984

The Jerk, Too is a 1984 American made-for-television comedy film starring Mark Blankfield as title character Navin Johnson, in a reworked version of the 1979 Steve Martin film The Jerk. While Martin is credited as "executive producer" of the film, he did not write or appear in the film.

== Plot ==
The story centers upon Navin Johnson, the white adopted son of a black farming family living in Alabama. One day his penpal Marie informs him that she will be marrying Count Marco and that the wedding will take place in Los Angeles, California. Navin decides that he shall attend the wedding and along the way, meets a hobo named Diesel. The two discover that Navin is a natural poker player, so they travel to Las Vegas in order to raise funds to complete Navin's journey to Los Angeles.

Once there, Navin attends Marie's engagement party and realizes that he is in love with Marie. He decides to climb into her room later that night to confess, in the process discovering that Marco is cheating on Marie. Navin is ultimately unsuccessful at telling Marie his feelings. Correctly assuming that Marie is in love with Navin, Marco arranges for Navin to get abducted until after the wedding is complete. Navin manages to escape and stop the wedding. The film ends with Navin and Marie flying away together in a hot air balloon, where she gives him his first kiss.

== Cast ==
- Mark Blankfield as Navin Johnson
- Ray Walston as Diesel
- Robert Sampson as Van Buren
- Patricia Barry as Mrs. Van Buren
- Barrie Ingham as Carl the Butler
- Stacey Nelkin as Marie Van Buren
- Jean LeClerc as Count Marco
- Thalmus Rasulala as Crossroads
- Pat McCormick as Dudley
- Bill Saluga as Shoes
- Mabel King as Mama Johnson
- Lina Raymond as Cheetah Johnson
- William Smith as Suicide
- Pete Schrum as Ugly Eddie
- Lainie Kazan as Card Player

== Development ==
While credited by some as a sequel, The Jerk, Too was written by Ziggy Steinberg and Rocco Urbisci to be a reworked version of the 1979 Steve Martin film. It was intended to serve as a TV pilot, but was never picked up for series. Martin was brought on as an executive producer but did not return as an actor or writer for The Jerk, Too. Mark Blankenfield was brought on to portray the main character, Navin. John Sebastian was brought on to write some of the music, penning "Navin's Theme".

== Release ==
The Jerk, Too premiered on NBC on January 6, 1984. The film received two DVD releases in the United Kingdom. The first was in 2007, as a double feature with The Jerk through UCA Catalogue, and the second was in 2017, through Fabulous Films Ltd and Fremantle Media Enterprises.

== Reception ==
Critical reception for the film has been negative. Tom Green of USA Today panned the film, criticizing the pacing as too slow and the comedy as "contrived and predictable slapstick." Erik Davis covered the film for his Moviefone blog Cinematical, calling it and another "Too" film, Splash, Too, horrific films.
