= Pulse (1988 film) =

Film by Paul Golding

- Theatrical release poster
- Directed by: Paul Golding
- Written by: Paul Golding
- Produced by: Patricia Stallone
- Starring: Cliff De Young; Roxanne Hart; Joey Lawrence
- Cinematography: Peter Lyons Collister
- Edited by: Gib Jaffe
- Music by: Jay Ferguson
- Production company: Aspen Film Society
- Distributed by: Columbia Pictures
- Release date: March 11, 1988
- Running time: 95 minutes
- Country: United States
- Language: English
- Budget: $6 million
- Box office: $40,397

Pulse is a 1988 American science fiction horror film written and directed by Paul Golding and starring Cliff De Young, Roxanne Hart, and Joey Lawrence. The film's title refers to a highly aggressive and intelligent pulse of electricity that terrorizes the occupants of a suburban house in Los Angeles, California. The film was produced through Columbia Pictures and the Aspen Film Society and distributed by Columbia Pictures. The titular Pulse and its accompanying elements were designed by Cinema Research Corporation.

== Plot ==
A highly aggressive, paranormal intelligence thriving within the electrical grid system of Los Angeles, California is moving from house to house. It terrorizes the occupants by taking control of the appliances, killing them or causing them to wreck the house in an effort to destroy it. Once this has been accomplished, it travels along the power lines to the next house, and the terror restarts. Having thus wrecked one household in a quiet, suburban neighborhood, the pulse finds itself in the home of a boy's divorced father whom he is visiting. It gradually takes control of everything, injuring the stepmother, and trapping father and son, who must fight their way out.

== Cast ==
- Cliff De Young as Bill Rockland
- Roxanne Hart as Ellen Rockland
- Joey Lawrence as David Rockland
- Matthew Lawrence as Stevie
- Charles Tyner as Old Man Holger
- Dennis Redfield as Pete
- Robert Romanus as Paul
- Myron Healey as Howard
- Michael Rider as Foreman
- Jean Sincere as Ruby
- Terry Beaver as policeman
- Greg Norberg as policeman
- Tim Russ as policeman

== Production ==
The film was produced by Aspen Film Society, a film production company founded by Steve Martin and William E. McEuen.

Paul Golding got the idea for Pulse from two unrelated events with the first being when the cinematographer Caleb Deschanel spent the night in his house and told him that at night he had been listening to "the sounds of the house ... the house was alive and it was taking care of me", and the second was when he heard about a computer that reprogrammed itself.

Golding wrote the screenplay under the working titles of House, Tract and Currents in 1981 but couldn't get it made until Columbia eventually took it on seven years later. David Morse and Tommy Lee Jones both auditioned for the role of Bill but lost to Cliff De Young. Production was completed a day early and $1 million under its $6 million budget, and as a result were able to afford Oxford Scientific Films to do many of the special effects.

== Music ==
The musical score for Pulse was composed by Jay Ferguson, who also composed "Pictures of You" from the soundtrack to The Terminator, and the film score to A Nightmare on Elm Street 5: The Dream Child.

== Release ==
David V. Picker, the head of Paramount Pictures at the time, was impressed by the film and intended to position it as a wide release, but changes in studio management curtailed this and it was only released theatrically in Texas and Oklahoma, while it went straight to video elsewhere. The movie did however become a success on video.

== Reception ==
On the review aggregator website Rotten Tomatoes, the film holds an approval rating of 60% based on 15 reviews.
