= Bullet in the Face =

- Genre: Dark comedy Action; Noir
- Created by: Alan Spencer
- Starring: Max Williams; Kate Kelton; Neil Napier; Jessica Steen; Eddie Izzard; Eric Roberts
- Countries of origin: Canada; United States
- Original language: English
- No. of seasons: 1
- No. of episodes: 6

Production
- Executive producers: Alan Spencer; Bruce Hills; Michael Prupas; Jesse Prupas; Evi Regev
- Camera setup: Single camera
- Running time: 22 minutes
- Production companies: Just For Laughs Television; Muse Entertainment Enterprises

Original release
- Network: IFC
- Release: August 16 – August 17, 2012

Bullet in the Face is a dark comedy television series developed by Alan Spencer. It premiered on IFC on August 16, 2012. It premiered in Canada on Super Channel on September 11, 2012. The series follows an ex-con, Gunter Vogler, who is recruited into the police force when he is betrayed by his partner and lover.

== Synopsis ==
The story is set in neo-noir Brüteville City, a dystopian city fought over by two vicious mob bosses, agoraphobic elitist Johann Tannhäuser (Eddie Izzard) and doltish Racken (Eric Roberts).

While robbing a jewelry store, Gunter Vogler (Max Williams), a sociopath and universally feared hitman, receives an order from his boss, Tannhäuser, to kill his partner and lover, Martine Mahler (Kate Kelton). Martine, however, complicates the situation when she tells Vogler that she is pregnant with his child. When a police officer interrupts the robbery, Vogler enthusiastically kills the cop, but he himself is shot in the face by Martine.

Waking up in a hospital, Vogler finds himself under the care of the Brüteville Police, who have surgically grafted the face of the detective he killed in place of his own. The police seek to use Vogler's knowledge of the criminal underworld and thirst for vengeance to finally take out the elusive Tannhäuser, with Vogler posing as the deceased cop. Partnering up with the morally unshakable Lt. Karl Hagerman (Neil Napier), the two solve crimes while searching for Tannhäuser, including a series of apparent priest suicides and a teenaged murderer.

== Characters ==
- Max Williams as Gunter Vogler: A notoriously unstable and violent hitman, Gunter Vogler invokes comic book supervillains such as the Joker as well as the antihero from the novel and film A Clockwork Orange. He temporarily allies himself with the police in order to seek revenge for being betrayed.
- Neil Napier as Lieutenant Karl Hagerman: Lt. Karl Hagerman is the opposite of Gunter Vogler: he's wimpy, emotional and prone to homoerotic gaffes. Vogler murdered every one of Hagerman's previous partners, but the two are forced to work together when Vogler receives a face transplant of Hagerman's last partner, who may have been his gay lover.
- Jessica Steen as Commissioner Eva Braden: The police commissioner, Eva Braden is overwhelmed by the violent gang wars in Brüteville. She recruits Gunter Vogler to fight evil with evil. She is sexually frustrated and unsuccessfully attempts to seduce both Hagerman's former partner and Gunter Vogler.
- Kate Kelton as Martine Mahler: Martine Mahler was Gunter Vogler's partner and lover before she betrayed him and shot him in the face. She is simultaneously having affairs with both Tannhäuser and Racken, whom she hopes to manipulate into a gang war against each other.
- Eddie Izzard as Johann Tannhäuser: A secretive, agoraphobic crime lord who favors chess. He sets up Gunter Vogler and Martine Mahler to kill each other, both of whom are assassins in his employ. Tannhäuser believes himself the father of Martine's baby and has big plans for the child, but not the mother.
- Eric Roberts as Racken: A dimwitted crime lord who opposes Tannhäuser. Racken believes himself married to Martine Mahler, though she is actually conning him. Racken recruits Vogler, who he believes to be a dirty cop, after Vogler convinces Racken that there's a mole in his organization.

== Production ==
The first three episodes were aired on August 16, 2012, in the U.S., followed by the remaining three episodes on August 17, 2012. The series is Canadian, produced for an American cable channel, and was filmed in Montreal, Quebec, Canada. Bullet in the Face is executive produced by series developer Alan Spencer, alongside Michael Prupas, Bruce Hills, Jesse Prupas, Evi Regev, and the production companies Just For Laughs Television and Muse Entertainment Enterprises. IFC originally presented Spencer with a concept for an action comedy that parodied Miami Vice and other 1980s shows. Spencer retooled the concept to be more perverse, modern, and stand in its own universe. Though he had been offered chances to remake Sledge Hammer! as a feature film, Spencer said that he did not want to retread his older work, so he instead created a more original project that would take advantage of newfound liberties – a series that he himself would watch. Production began in October 2011.

Visual influences include graphic novels, Quentin Tarantino, Ridley Scott, and film noir such as Alphaville. Other influences cited by journalists include Face/Off, Sin City, and Guy Ritchie films, all of which it parodies. Spencer cited the level of violence in the series, describing it as "the most violent comedy in television history". The Parents Television Council confirmed this by listing the series amongst its "seven most violent shows on cable" for that season where it bore the distinction of being the only half-hour comedy on the list. With its filmic influences, Spencer thought it appropriate to include stylized action sequences and violence not usually associated with half-hour comedies. The camerawork, such as use of the Dutch angle, was designed to be reminiscent of graphic novels as well as the Cinema of Europe.

The series musical score was composed by James Gelfand. The theme song was composed and produced by AmA, a group whose members are Amanda Bauman and Patrick Doyle; Bauman provided the vocals.

== Episodes ==
No.	Title	Directed by	Written by	Original release date	US viewers (millions)
1	"Meet Gunter Vogler"	Érik Canuel	Alan Spencer	August 16, 2012	0.094
Gunter Vogler, a vicious criminal, is betrayed and left for dead, only to be recruited by the police, who want to use him against the mob. Given a badge and authority, Vogler becomes even more dangerous and out of control.
2	"Angel of Death"	Érik Canuel	Alan Spencer	August 16, 2012	0.087
Vogler and Hagerman investigate a series of apparent suicides by priests, uncovering a conspiracy involving a dentist-hitman and gangsters who are hiding out in churches.
3	"Drug of Choice"	Érik Canuel	Alan Spencer	August 16, 2012	0.077
A teenager goes on a violent rampage and kills several people, impressing Vogler. Vogler encourages the boy to embrace his dark side, but Vogler then must defuse a hostage situation at the school when it turns out that a new drug is the cause of the violence in the city. Vogler is shot in the face again during the hostage crisis, which drives him even further into madness.
4	"Kiss Me Thrice"	Érik Canuel	Alan Spencer	August 17, 2012	0.054
Vogler confronts Racken, exposes some dirty cops, and attempts to figure out Martine's plans. Martine has convinced Tannhäuser, Racken, and Vogler that each man is the father of her baby, and has even married Racken while living under a false identity. More curious than anything else, Vogler does not expose Martine to Racken.
5	"The World Stage"	Érik Canuel	Alan Spencer	August 17, 2012	0.093
Vogler and Hagerman fight a group of prostitutes who are knocking off gangsters and inflaming tensions in the underworld. Racken and Tannhäuser, convinced that each other are behind the attacks, declare war, threatening to destroy the entire city.
6	"Cradle to Grave"	Érik Canuel	Alan Spencer	August 17, 2012	0.053
Everyone converges on the hospital in which Martine is giving birth. Martine reveals that she's been playing all sides against each other so that she can take control of the underworld. Her pregnancy is revealed to have been a ruse, and she pulls out a submachine gun from the prosthetic belly, killing Racken and his men. While Martine prepares to kill Vogler once again, a bomb planted by Tannhäuser's men counts down to zero. The show fades to black on that cliffhanger.

No further episodes are planned at this time.

== Critical reception ==
Bullet in the Face received mixed reviews. Metacritic, a review aggregator, rated it 67 out of 100 based on four reviews. Positive reviews highlighted the wild originality and cult appeal, while more critical reviews focused on an uneven tone. Matthew Gilbert of The Boston Globe wrote: "Spencer conjures up the same cult sensibility of Sledge Hammer! and ushers it into the more politically incorrect and graphic world of 2010s America and cable TV." Jesse Tigges of Columbus Alive wrote: "Bullet in the Face is, hands down, one of the strangest things I've ever watched." Brian Lowry of Variety called it "gleefully juvenile" and recommended it for "a genre-savvy crowd that can appreciate the joke." Mike Hale of The New York Times wrote: "… the show suffers from a failure to commit: resolutely charting a middle course between cheese-ball parody and something darker and more sophisticated, it manages to be both over the top and consistently flat, too silly to take seriously and too dull to care about." The series garnered solid ratings for IFC, increasing their usual viewership. As with Spencer's previous cult series, Bullet in the Face received a critical reappraisal on DVD. Francis Rizzo of DVD Talk wrote: "Spencer hits all the right notes here, crafting a cinematic experience that looks great and manages an excellent balance of comedy and action, with a healthy number of laugh-out-loud moments, thanks in large part to the wonderful dialogue." Diane Werts of Newsday wrote: "Ultra-stylish, incredibly violent, it's a touchstone of comic tone and meticulous production." Tirdad Derakhshani of The Philadelphia Inquirer called it "wickedly dark and hilarious". Rob Hunter of Film School Rejects wrote, "This six episode series from IFC is foul-mouthed and violent, and its razor-sharp wit comes with a satirical edge. It's an acquired taste to be sure, but if you remember Sledge Hammer! then you know what you'll be getting here."

=== Awards ===
Neil Napier received a nomination for "Outstanding Male Performance" for his portrayal of Lieutenant Karl Hagerman in "Bullet in the Face" from the 2013 ACTRA Awards.

== DVD release ==
Shout Factory released entire series on DVD in the U.S. and Canada in January 2014 with commentary provided by Alan Spencer. A Blu-ray release from Beyond Home Entertainment was also released for foreign regions.
