= Aspen Film Society =

American film production company

- Company type: Production company
- Industry: Film
- Founded: 1976; 50 years ago
- Founders: Steve Martin; William E. McEuen
- Fate: inactive
- Headquarters: Los Angeles, California, United States
- Products: motion pictures

Aspen Film Society was an American film production company formed in 1976 by actor, writer, comedian, and musician Steve Martin and film and record producer William E. McEuen, with backing from Paramount Pictures. The company's films include The Jerk and Pee-wee's Big Adventure.

== Beginnings ==
The company's first project, the 1977 short film The Absent-Minded Waiter, starred Steve Martin, Teri Garr, and Buck Henry. Written by Martin and directed by Carl Gottlieb, it was nominated for the Academy Award for Best Live Action Short Film at the 50th Academy Awards.

In the wake of Woody Allen's Annie Hall winning four Oscars at the 50th Academy Awards, Martin received $500,000 from Universal Pictures to write and star in the box office hit The Jerk, and the company gave Aspen Film Society and Martin the last cut and approval of the marketing campaign, as well as 50 percent of the profits.

== Filmography ==
Aspen Film Society
Date	Film	Director	Distribution Company	Notes
1977	The Absent-Minded Waiter	Carl Gottlieb	Paramount Pictures	nominated for the Academy Award for Best Live Action Short Film
1979	The Jerk	Carl Reiner	Universal Pictures	
1980	Steve Martin: Comedy is Not Pretty	Joseph Cates		TV special
1982	Dead Men Don't Wear Plaid	Carl Reiner	Universal Pictures	
1983	The Man with Two Brains	Carl Reiner	Warner Bros.	
1984	The Lonely Guy	Arthur Hiller	Universal Pictures	
1985	Pee-wee's Big Adventure	Tim Burton	Warner Bros.	Burton's feature-length directorial debut
1988	Pulse	Paul Golding	Columbia Pictures	
1989	The Big Picture	Christopher Guest	Columbia Pictures	
1990	Cold Dog Soup	Alan Metter	Anchor Bay Entertainment	

== See also ==
- Steve Martin filmography
- List of live-action film production companies
- New Hollywood
