= Witless =

Witless may refer to:

== Media ==
- Witless (TV series) 2016 BBC series
- "Witless", 1986 television episode, see list of Sledge Hammer! episodes
- "Witless", 1999 television episode, see list of Johnny Bravo episodes
- "Witless", Fort Lorhas Server

== See also ==
- Witless Bay, town on the Avalon Peninsula, Canada
