= Ziggy Steinberg =

American film director

- Born: United States
- Occupation(s): Screenwriter, film producer, television producer, film director

Ziggy Steinberg is a screenwriter and producer. He was in college when he wrote stand-up comedy material for David Steinberg (no relation), George Carlin and Debbie Reynolds.

His first script for television was the "Neighbors" episode of The Mary Tyler Moore Show in 1974. He then went on to write The Bob Newhart Show, The David Steinberg Show, The American Music Awards (from 1976 through 1980), It's Garry Shandling's Show, several Lily Tomlin specials for CBS, including Lily: Sold Out for which he won an Emmy Award in the category of Best Musical or Variety Show.

In addition, he authored many short stories and humor pieces for various magazines, including Gagtime, a parody of E.L. Doctorow's Ragtime, which he co-wrote with David Steinberg. Gagtime received a Playboy Editorial Award for Humor in 1976.

Steinberg produced and wrote the screenplay for The Jerk, Too, the sequel to Steve Martin's The Jerk as well as Porky's Revenge, the sequel to Porky's. He then wrote and directed The Boss' Wife for Tri-Star Pictures. In 1991, he wrote and produced Another You, which was the last time Gene Wilder and Richard Pryor co-starred in a motion picture. It was Richard Pryor's final starring role.
