= Rocco Urbisci =

American film director

- Born: United States
- Occupation(s): Film director, producer, screenwriter

Rocco Urbisci is an American director, producer and film and television writer.

Urbisci has written films and television shows such as Richard Pryor's Jo Jo Dancer, Your Life Is Calling, The Richard Pryor Show and the made for television sequel to The Jerk entitled The Jerk, Too with Mark Blankfield replacing Steve Martin in the lead.

Urbisci worked frequently with comedian George Carlin and produced and directed many of Carlin's comedy specials.

He won an Emmy for producing the 1981 Lily Tomlin comedy special Lily: Sold Out.
