= Jean Sincere =

American actress

- Born: August 16, 1919; Mount Vernon, New York, U.S.
- Died: April 3, 2013 (aged 93); Los Angeles, California, U.S.
- Occupation: Actress
- Years active: 1941–2012
- Spouse: Charles Carmine Zambello (m. 1949; died 1992)
- Children: 2, including Francesca Zambello

Jean "Sinny" Sincere Zambello (August 16, 1919 – April 3, 2013) was an American film, television, theater and voice actress. Her credits included the films Roxanne, The Incredibles, and the musical television series, Glee.

== Early life ==
Sincere was born on August 16, 1919, in Mount Vernon, New York.

== Career ==
In 1941, she debuted in her first Broadway performance in a production of Arsenic and Old Lace. Her other Broadway credits included Brigadoon (1947), Barefoot Boy With Cheek (1947), Razzle Dazzle (1951), Wonderful Town (1953), By the Beautiful Sea (1954), and Oh Captain! (1958).

Sincere joined the United Service Organizations (USO), entertaining American troops during World War II. She also performed with the Peninsula Players in Wisconsin.

Sincere provided the voice for Mrs. Hogenson in the 2004 Pixar film, The Incredibles, directed by Brad Bird. She was cast in a recurring role as the Librarian in the FOX series, Glee, in 2010 and 2011. Her last role was in a guest appearance as Gloria on the Nickelodeon series, iCarly, in November 2012.

== Personal life ==
Sincere died from natural causes in Los Angeles, California, on April 3, 2013, at the age of 93. She had two children, director Francesca Zambello and art dealer Larry Zambello. Her late husband, Charles Carmine Zambello, whom she married in 1949, died in 1992. She was a Christian Scientist.

== Filmography ==
=== Film ===
Year	Title	Role	Notes
1977	A Little Night Music	Box Office Lady in Theatre	
1987	Roxanne	Nina	
1988	Pulse	Ruby	
2004	The Incredibles	Mrs. Hogenson	Voice

=== Television ===
Year	Title	Role	Notes
1950–1951	Lux Video Theatre	Various roles	3 episodes
1960	The Comedy Spot	Mrs. Harley	Episode: "Head of the Family"
1985	Thirteen at Dinner	Ellis the Maid	Television film
1985, 1987	The Facts of Life	Various roles	2 episodes
1986	Cagney & Lacey	Judge Stenborg	Episode: "Disenfranchised"
1986	She's with Me	Hedda	Television film
1987	St. Elsewhere	Mrs. Woolson	Episode: "Russian Roulette"
1988	Addicted to His Love	Edith	Television film
1988	Scandal in a Small Town	Etta Wethli	Television film
1989	Newhart	Rita	Episode: "Shoe Business Is My Life"
1989	It's Garry Shandling's Show	Audience Member	Episode: "Going, Going, Gone"
1989	Alien Nation	Granny	Episode: "Fifteen with Wanda"
1990	Who's the Boss?	Mrs. Albrecht	Episode: "Hey Dude"
1990	Good Grief	Emmie	Episode: "Warren Learns to Fly"
1990	Dallas	Room service attendant	Episode: "Heart and Soul"
1991	Nurses	Mrs. King	Episode: "Coming to America"
1992	Murphy Brown	Louise, Gene's Secretary	Episode: "Rage Before Beauty"
1992	The Wonder Years	Nurse	Episode: "Lunch Stories"
1993	Renegade	Mildred	Episode: "Give and Take"
1993	Love & War	Nun	Episode: "I Love a Parade"
1994	Empty Nest	Eileen	Episode: "The Ballad of Shady Pines"
1994	Party of Five	Older Woman	Episode: "Worth Waiting For"
1994	Lois & Clark	Distraught Woman	Episode: "A Bolt from the Blue"
1995	The Wayans Bros.	Shrimp Lady	Episode: "Free Wally"
1995	Courthouse	Mrs. Daly	Episode: "One flew over the Courthouse"
1995	The Client	Lucille Carruthers	Episode: "Drive, He Said"
1996	7th Heaven	Cafeteria Lady	Episode: "What Will People Say?"
1997	The Drew Carey Show	The Old Lady	Episode: "Drew and the Singles Union"
1997	The Pretender	Gladys	Episode: "Exposed"
1997	Alright Already	Phyllis	Episode: "Again with the Funeral"
1999	Everybody Loves Raymond	Merry Widow #3	Episode: "Cursing with Marie"
1999	ER	Gladys	Episode: "Power"
1999, 2000	Beyond Belief: Fact or Fiction	Emmaline	Episode: "The Gathering"
2000	Strong Medicine	Edith	Episode: "Performance Anxiety"
2001	Gary & Mike	Additional voices	Episode: "Washington D.C."
2002	Malcolm in the Middle	Old Woman	Episode: "Lois' Makeover"
2002	Ally McBeal	Mary Ellen	Episode: "Love Is All Around: Part 1"
2002	MDs	Evelyn	Episode: "Wing and a Prayer"
2003	The Division	Woman at Graveyard	Episode: "Murder.com"
2003	Frasier	Old Daphne	Episode: "The Devil & Dr. Phil"
2003	The Parkers	Woman	Episode: "A Plot of View"
2003	It's All Relative	Aunt Eileen	Episode: "Waking Uncle Paddy"
2005	Invasion	Mrs. Lowell	Episode: "Alpha Male"
2007	Private Practice	Gloria Walker	Episode: "In Which Sam Receives an Unexpected Visitor..."
2008	October Road	Old Woman	Episode: "Stand Alone by Me"
2009	Mending Fences	Mary Ann	Television film
2010–2011	Glee	Ancient Librarian	3 episodes
2012	iCarly	Gloria	Episode: "iBust a Thief"
