= The Boss' Wife =

1986 film by Ziggy Steinberg

- Directed by: Ziggy Steinberg
- Written by: Ziggy Steinberg
- Produced by: Thomas H. Brodek
- Starring: Daniel Stern; Arielle Dombasle; Fisher Stevens; Melanie Mayron; Christopher Plummer
- Cinematography: Gary Thieltges
- Edited by: John A. Martinelli
- Music by: Bill Conti
- Production company: Tri-Star Pictures
- Distributed by: Tri-Star Pictures
- Release date: November 7, 1986
- Running time: 83 minutes
- Country: United States
- Language: English

The Boss' Wife is a 1986 American comedy film directed by Ziggy Steinberg and starring Daniel Stern, Arielle Dombasle and Christopher Plummer. It is about a young stockbroker who becomes enticed by the wife of his boss.

== Plot ==
The wife of the boss tries openly and avidly to seduce a married stockbroker at a company function.

== Cast ==
- Daniel Stern as Joel Keefer
- Arielle Dombasle as Louise Roalvang
- Fisher Stevens as Carlos Delgado
- Melanie Mayron as Janet Keefer
- Lou Jacobi as Harry Taphorn
- Martin Mull as Tony Dugdale
- Christopher Plummer as Mr. Roalvang
- Diane Stilwell as Suzy Dugdale
- Robert Costanzo as Eddie
- Jack Andreozzi as Doorman

== Release ==
=== Home media ===
The Boss's Wife was released on VHS on May 14, 1987, by Key Video.
