= List of Sledge Hammer! episodes =

Sledge Hammer! is a satirical American television series broadcast on ABC in the United States. The series was created by Alan Spencer and stars David Rasche as Inspector Sledge Hammer, a preposterous caricature of the standard "cop on the edge" character. It was first broadcast on September 23, 1986, and ran until February 12, 1988, after just two seasons. The series has received generally favorable reviews from critics.

Many of the episode titles are parodies of film and TV show titles.

== Series overview ==
Season	Episodes	Originally released	
Season	Episodes	First released	Last released
1	22	September 23, 1986	April 28, 1987
2	19	September 17, 1987	February 12, 1988

== Episodes ==
=== Season 1 (1986–87) ===
No. overall	No. in season	Title	Directed by	Written by	Original release date
1	1	"Under the Gun"	Martha Coolidge	Alan Spencer	September 23, 1986
The mayor's daughter is abducted and is held for ransom of a million dollars. The mayor calls for Sledge Hammer, a police inspector known for confronting situations with gun violence or massive destruction wherever he goes, to take the case and to partner with a woman police detective Dori Doreau. This pilot episode places Sledge and the police department in San Francisco, and is the only episode to feature a laugh track.
2	2	"Hammer Gets Nailed"	Chuck Braverman	Mike Reiss & Al Jean	September 26, 1986
Sledge and Dori give a local television reporter and his cameraman a ride-along, but when he gets injured, he gives a negative review, resulting in Captain Trunk having to lay off Sledge and half of his department. Sledge ends up working as a crossing guard until he hears about a nearby bomb threat.
3	3	"Witless"	Jackie Cooper	Alan Spencer	October 3, 1986
A crime boss places a million dollar hit on Sledge. Although he luckily makes it to work, he is ordered by Captain Trunk to leave town and lay low. Sledge ends up in a remote farmland run by a "Maninote" and his attractive daughter. The title is a reference of the 1985 film Witness; creator Alan Spencer said the episode wasn't a parody of that film but more about putting Sledge in a similar setting.
4	4	"They Shoot Hammers, Don't They?"	David Wechter	S : Diana Ayers, Susan Sebastian; S/T : Mert Rich, Brian Pollack, Alan Spencer	October 17, 1986
Convict John Kogan takes over a prison bus, going on a destruction spree over multiple towns. He challenges his former police partner and best friend Sledge to a gunfighting duel. Sledge tries to get suspended so he can accept the duel. The title is a reference to the film They Shoot Horses, Don't They?.
5	5	"Dori Day Afternoon"	James Sheldon	Mert Rich & Brian Pollack	October 24, 1986
After the ATM denies Sledge any funds, Sledge and Dori visit the bank but end up being hostages of a bank robbery. The robber leader seems to be his doppelganger. A spoof of the hostage bank robbery movie Dog Day Afternoon.
6	6	"To Sledge, with Love"	David Wechter	Jim Fisher & Jim Staahl	October 31, 1986
Sledge is charged to reform some high school delinquents who would rather follow a crime boss in stealing car parts.
7	7	"All Shook Up"	Jackie Cooper	Alan Spencer	November 6, 1986
Elvis impersonators around town have been serially murdered at their cars by someone using a golden microphone. Sledge enrolls in the Elvis school and enters some contests to bait the murderer. The title is a reference to Elvis's song of the same name.
8	8	"Over My Dead Bodyguard"	Charles S. Dubin	Mike Reiss & Al Jean	November 14, 1986
As Captain Trunk is scheduled to testify against a crime syndicate, Sledge is assigned by the city commissioner to be his personal bodyguard. He saves Trunk from several attacks but causes more physical damage while Trunk tries to reconcile with his ex-wife.
9	9	"Magnum Farce"	Chuck Braverman	Jim Fisher & Jim Staahl	November 22, 1986
A group of police officers have been killing off recently acquitted criminal defendants. The police department have to work with a new district attorney. Sledge stages an altercation with Captain Trunk in order to lure the corrupt officers into recruiting him. A spoof of the Dirty Harry film Magnum Force.
10	10	"If I Had a Little Hammer"	Kim Manners	Deborah Raznick & Daniel Benton	November 29, 1986
Newborns have been abducted from a hospital. As the infants are to be sold in an illegal adoption racket, Sledge and Dori pretend to be a rich couple looking to adopt. The title is a reference to the song "If I Had a Hammer".
11	11	"To Live and Die on TV"	Daniel Attias	Mert Rich & Brian Pollack	December 13, 1986
A quiz show contestant who was going for the grand prize on The Million Dollar Question is found dead in his newly won car submerged in the river. Sledge learns from the coroner that there was no alcohol found in his body. He volunteers to go on the show in an attempt to prove the host (Peter Marshall) was responsible for the murder.
12	12	"Miss of the Spider Woman"	Chuck Braverman	Mike Reiss & Al Jean	December 20, 1986
Sledge inadvertently ingests snake venom and has less than eight hours before he dies to find the assassin and the antidote. He and Dori track a woman who slipped him the venom to a mud wrestling bar, and learn she went to the wrong apartment. With the help of Sledge's landlord, they eventually find the woman behind the entire ploy who was hoping to get her ex-lover to reunite with her. The title is a reference to Kiss of the Spider Woman which had a film adaptation released in 1985.
13	13	"The Old Man and the Sledge"	Chuck Braverman	Mert Rich & Brian Pollack	January 3, 1987
Sledge meets his idol Gil Yates, a former police officer who does not want to relocate to a retirement home. Sledge arranges for Gil to have a security job at a jewelry store, but trouble arises when robbers overpower Gil, and then later the robbers come back and are shot by the store owner. The title is a reference to the Ernest Hemingway novel The Old Man and the Sea.
14	14	"State of Sledge"	Dan Attias	Al Jean & Mike Reiss	January 10, 1987
Captain Trunk tries to hide Sledge's files from an internal affairs officer who is auditing the precinct. When Sledge arrives with the arrest of a satanic cult leader named Slag, the officer tells Sledge to give him a phone call, which Slag uses to summon his gang to surround the police station. Dori also brings on-board a young police cadet..
15	15	"Haven't Gun, Will Travel"	David Wechter	Gerald Gardner	January 17, 1987
A leader of a struggling criminal group decides that Sledge must be destroyed. Sledge is required to take psychology sessions. One night, a thief breaks into his apartment and steals Sledge's Magnum, and this devastates Sledge. He has to use a tiny pistol, until he learns that his Magnum has been used in a new crime spree. The title uses the snowclone "Have X, will travel".
16	16	"The Color of Hammer"	Bruce Bilson	Mert Rich & Brian Pollack	January 24, 1987
Sledge has been admiring a strict judge; he and Dori go on a walk and meet him as he is enjoying lunch. A woman seduces the judge to a pool hall where she hustles him out of a lot of money. In order to make up the debt, he acquits the defendant related to the gang, but is later stabbed by the woman when he threatens to go public about the blackmail. Sledge, Dori, and Captain Trunk go to the pool hall to try to lure out the hustler, with Sledge trying to do some hustling of his own. A spoof of the 1986 film The Color of Money.
17	17	"Brother, Can You Spare a Crime?"	Chuck Braverman	Gerald Gardner	January 31, 1987
A man who was arrested for breaking and entering claims to be Myles Hammer, Sledge's brother. He easily wins over everyone he interacts with, except for Sledge himself. When Dori goes on a date with Myles, she discovers he faked his identity. The title is based on the song title "Brother, Can You Spare a Dime?"
18	18	"Desperately Seeking Dori"	Bob Sweeney	Mike Reiss & Al Jean	February 7, 1987
Dori pursues a counterfeit money operator, but he loosens a rope and a mobile artwork falls on her. When she recovers from the blow to the head, she seems to have adopted the excessively violent, aggressive personality and mannerisms of the person she is around every day: Sledge Hammer. A reference to the 1985 film Desperately Seeking Susan.
19	19	"Sledgepoo"	Thomas Schlamme	Alan Mandel	February 14, 1987
Sledge investigates a beauty salon that is suspected to be a front for a cat burglar operation. While he gets his hair done by Sir Guy (Michael Des Barres), Sledge subtly remarks that he would like to participate in the operation as a "second-story man" (break into the second-story of a house). The title is a reference to the film Shampoo.
20	20	"Comrade Hammer"	Bruce Bilson	Dave Ketchum & Tony DiMarco	February 21, 1987
Sledge and Dori must escort a Soviet-defecting scientist on a passenger train while evading KGB agents.
21	21	"Jagged Sledge"	Reza Badiyi	S : Doug Molitor; S/T : Chris Ruppenthal	April 21, 1987
Sledge becomes his own attorney in a murder trial of racketeer Hugo Victor (a clear word play with the author of 'Les Misérables' Victor Hugo). However, the witnesses and his own team seem to incriminate him even further. He is found guilty until he makes a last-minute observation. The title is a reference to the 1985 legal film Jagged Edge.
22	22	"The Spa Who Loved Me"	Jackie Cooper	Tino Insana & Robert Wuhl	April 28, 1987
Robin Leach introduces this episode, stating it will be a filled with extra action and end in a cliffhanger. A military truck is stopped by a group of women in bikinis playing volleyball in the middle of the road, but the guys get knocked out by gas and get their cargo stolen. Sledge and Dori must find the terrorist leader who plans to blow up the city with a nuclear bomb unless they get a billion dollars. Going off descriptions, they visit the facility of a popular aerobics video instructor Jill Taylor. The title is a reference to the James Bond film The Spy Who Loved Me.

=== Season 2 (1987–88) ===
No. overall	No. in season	Title	Directed by	Written by	Original release date
23	1	"A Clockwork Hammer"	Reza Badiyi	S : Alan Spencer; T : Chris Ruppenthal	September 17, 1987
At the beginning of the episode, it is stated that the season takes place five years prior to the ending of the previous season. A fellow cop goes crazy on the witness stand on the mention of the defendant's name Johnny "Red Shoes" Haggis. Sledge suspects there might be brainwashing involved through a lab room so he spreads news that he will go on the witness stand with "new information". That night, Johnny's goons abduct Sledge and subject him to watching violent videos, which doesn't work, so they resort to a Max Headroom-like avatar of himself. A spoof of A Clockwork Orange
24	2	"Big Nazi on Campus"	Chuck Braverman	S : Alan Spencer; T : Mert Rich, Brian Pollack	September 24, 1987
Sledge and Dori investigate the murder of a college coed. They interview her research advisor (Ray Walston) and find that she has been studying the Third Reich. Sledge suspects her boyfriend, who plays quarterback, and tries to get him to confess. Dori finds the girl was in possession of some expensive jewelry and goes after the professor.
25	3	"Play It Again, Sledge"	Bill Bixby	S : Alan Spencer; T : David Ketchum, Tony DiMarco	October 1, 1987
After Sledge violently arrests a purse snatcher, he and Dori are suspended for six months without pay. Having seen Casablanca on TV recently, Sledge starts imagining Rick Blaine's character, complete with hat and trench coat, who advises Sledge to become a private investigator. The title is a spoof of "Play it again, Sam", Rick's misquoted line from the film
26	4	"Wild About Hammer"	Gary Walkow	Alan Spencer	October 8, 1987
Elizabeth Jenkins, a female cop, falls for Sledge. She tries to seduce him, even being sadomasochistic, but when Sledge refuses, she shoots and grazes his head. The next day, Sledge is accused of sexually harassing her and has to hand in his badge. Dori suspects Elizabeth is hiding something.
27	5	"Death of a Few Salesmen"	Bill Bixby	S : Brooke Kofford, Bret Kofford; T : Mark Curtiss, Rod Ash	October 15, 1987
Sledge suspects he has psychic powers after he wishes the used car salesman on TV was dead and he dies. When Dori tries to convince Sledge he had nothing to do with it, she discovers that the last few salesmen all died within 48 hours of their wedding, and were married to women with similar sounding names. To lure the widow out, Sledge goes undercover as a hot-shot Australian car dealer Crocodile Bruce. The title is a spoof of the play Death of a Salesman.
28	6	"Vertical"	Reza Badiyi	David Ketchum & Tony DiMarco	October 29, 1987
While suffering from vertigo, Sledge must protect the girlfriend of a mobster. A spoof of Vertigo
29	7	"Dressed to Call"	Jackie Cooper	Mert Rich & Brian Pollack	November 5, 1987
Sledge must discover who is making threatening calls to a radio psychologist.
30	8	"Hammer Hits the Rock"	Bill Bixby	Mark Curtiss & Rod Ash	November 12, 1987
Sledge poses as an assassin to discover a mobster's secret hideout.
31	9	"Last of the Red Hot Vampires"	Bill Bixby	Alan Spencer	November 19, 1987
An old-time actor who played vampires in the movies dies, but a vampire is then seen at two murders where the victims are drained of blood.
32	10	"Hammeroid"	Gary Walkow	Ron Friedman	November 26, 1987
After breaking nearly all his bones, Sledge encases himself in a robotic suit to stop a robot. A spoof of RoboCop
33	11	"Sledge in Toyland"	Gary Walkow	Brian Pollack & Mert Rich	December 3, 1987
Sledge is sent to investigate when a toy manufacturer is attacked by one of his own toys. A spoof of Babes in Toyland
34	12	"Icebreaker"	Bill Bixby	S : Chris Ruppenthal; T : Mark Curtiss, Rod Ash	December 10, 1987
Sledge finds himself competing with a British cop who later turns out to be an international terrorist known as "The Pelican".
35	13	"They Call Me Mr. Trunk"	Seymour Robbie	Mark Curtiss & Rod Ash	December 17, 1987
Trunk must solve the puzzle of why the army has surrounded the entire precinct before the entire staff dies. A spoof of They Call Me Mr. Tibbs
36	14	"Model Dearest"	Dick Martin	David Ketchum & Tony DiMarco	January 7, 1988
Dori poses as a model to get the dirt on a white slavery ring.
37	15	"Sledge, Rattle & Roll"	Bill Bixby	Mert Rich & Brian Pollack	January 15, 1988
Hammer investigates the mysterious deaths of a heavy metal group and their manager.
38	16	"Suppose They Gave a War & Sledge Came?"	Dick Martin	Chris Ruppenthal	January 22, 1988
To investigate the death of a prominent businessman, Sledge joins a weekend paintball tournament organization.
39	17	"The Secret of My Excess"	Dick Martin	Alicia Marie Schudt	January 29, 1988
The governor assigns Sledge to find his missing daughter, but Sledge also has to keep the assignment a secret.
40	18	"It Happened What Night?"	Bill Bixby	Mark Curtiss & Rod Ash	February 5, 1988
The precinct thinks that Sledge and Dori have slept together when all that appears on a surveillance tape is them drunk and in bed.
41	19	"Here's to You, Mrs. Hammer"	Bill Bixby	Mert Rich & Brian Pollack	February 12, 1988
Sledge's ex-wife Susan Hilton (named in homage to Agent 99 from Get Smart) marries his best high school friend and forces Sledge to think about his lifestyle. A spoof of The Graduate song "Mrs. Robinson". His ex-wife is played by David Rasche's real-life wife, Heather Lupton.
