= Another You =

1991 film by Maurice Phillips

- Theatrical release poster
- Directed by: Maurice Phillips
- Written by: Ziggy Steinberg
- Produced by: Ziggy Steinberg
- Starring: Richard Pryor; Gene Wilder; Mercedes Ruehl; Stephen Lang; Vanessa Williams
- Cinematography: Victor J. Kemper
- Edited by: Dennis M. Hill
- Music by: Charles Gross
- Production company: Tri-Star Pictures
- Distributed by: Tri-Star Pictures
- Release date: July 26, 1991
- Running time: 94 minutes
- Country: United States
- Language: English
- Budget: $17 million
- Box office: $2.9 million

Another You is a 1991 American comedy film directed by Maurice Phillips and written and produced by Ziggy Steinberg. The film stars Richard Pryor, Gene Wilder, Mercedes Ruehl, Stephen Lang, and Vanessa Williams. It follows con man Eddie Dash (Pryor) and former pathological liar George (Wilder), who become entangled in a scheme to pass the latter off as the missing heir to a brewery fortune.

Production was troubled, with original director Peter Bogdanovich replaced during filming after his footage was deemed unusable, and a shift in shooting locations from New York City to Los Angeles led to the film being rewritten for the new setting. Pryor described the shoot as a negative experience.

Released on July 26, 1991, by Tri-Star Pictures, Another You was a critical and commercial failure, grossing approximately $2.9 million against a reported $17 million budget. Reviews were negative, describing the film as lacking any comedic entertainment, with even the combined talents of Pryor and Wilder unable to save it. The film marked the fourth and final screen pairing of Pryor and Wilder following their popular collaborations on Silver Streak (1976), Stir Crazy (1980), and See No Evil, Hear No Evil (1989). It was Wilder's final appearance in a theatrical film and was also the last major acting role for Pryor, who had been diagnosed with multiple sclerosis shortly before filming began.

== Plot ==
Con man Eddie Dash, required to complete community service for past crimes, reluctantly chooses the easiest assignment: accompanying mental patient and reformed pathological liar George as he adjusts to life outside the sanitarium. Although George quickly assumes Eddie is his best friend, Eddie attempts to ditch him at a museum. Panicked, George runs outside and knocks over Al Sandro, who mistakes him for millionaire brewery heir Abe Fielding, missing for five months. Al arranges to meet George at a café to pay a large debt owed to Abe. Sensing an opportunity, Eddie convinces George to go along with the ruse. At the café, staff and patrons also recognize George as Abe. Forced to maintain the deception, George spins elaborate stories about his supposed disappearance.

Outside, George is confronted by Abe's wife, Elaine, who brings him to their mansion. Despite George's attempts to admit the truth, Elaine remains convinced he is Abe. The next morning, Eddie arrives to collect George, praising his lying skills, but George regrets deceiving Elaine, to whom he is attracted. Abe's business manager, Rupert Dibbs, appears with cash and a credit card for 'Abe', which Eddie promptly pockets before leaving. Overwhelmed without Eddie's support, George panics and returns to the sanitarium.

Meanwhile, Elaine is revealed to be actress Mimi Kravitz, hired by Rupert, along with other paid actors, to convince George he is Abe. Rupert, who expected to inherit the brewery after Abe Fielding Sr.'s death, discovered that Abe Sr. had an illegitimate son, now deceased. To stall probate and secure the brewery for himself, Rupert plots to pass George off as the heir. He even pays Eddie to participate.

Eddie brings George back to the mansion, where George tries to win Elaine's affection. Moved by his sincerity, Elaine begins to regret deceiving him. George serenades her with a yodeling performance at an Austrian restaurant, and they grow closer, eventually spending the night together.

At Rupert's urging, Eddie and Elaine escort George to doctors and a dentist to create false medical records. Overhearing an unrelated discussion about identifying bodies through dental records, they realize Rupert plans to murder George to claim the brewery. Rupert dismisses Elaine's concerns and secretly offers Eddie a large sum to kill George. During a hunting trip, Rupert eavesdrops on Eddie and George through a remote device. Instead of hunting, George warns animals to flee, but the pair are soon confronted by a bear. Panicked, Eddie fires his gun, seemingly killing George.

At the funeral, Eddie delivers an impromptu eulogy, only for George to reappear, revealing they faked his death. Eddie announces he has recorded Rupert's incriminating conversations, exposing his murder plot. Rupert tries to unmask George as an imposter, but his own hired actors maintain the deception. Enraged that George will inherit the brewery, Rupert attacks him, but is subdued by Eddie and Elaine and taken into custody.

Rupert warns George that living a lie will consume him. In response, George confesses his real identity to the crowd, but they dismiss it as a joke, leaving him in control of the brewery with Eddie and Elaine by his side.

Sometime later, George and Elaine celebrate their wedding on a tropical beach with Eddie and his girlfriend Gloria, Rupert's former secretary.

== Cast ==
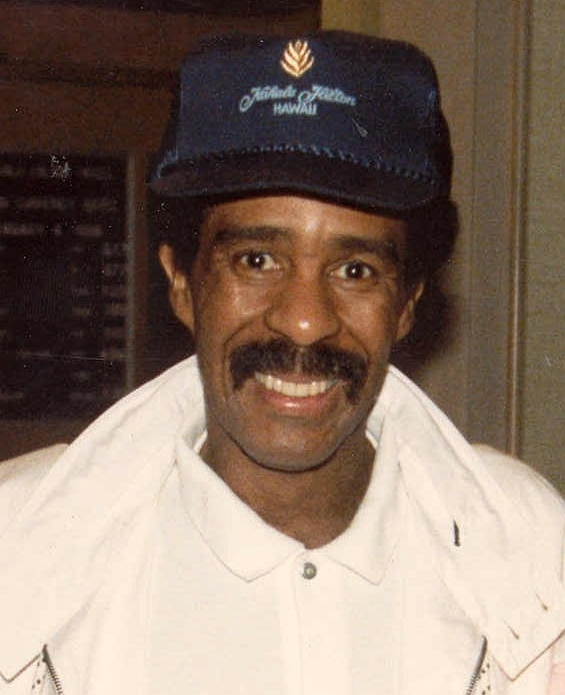
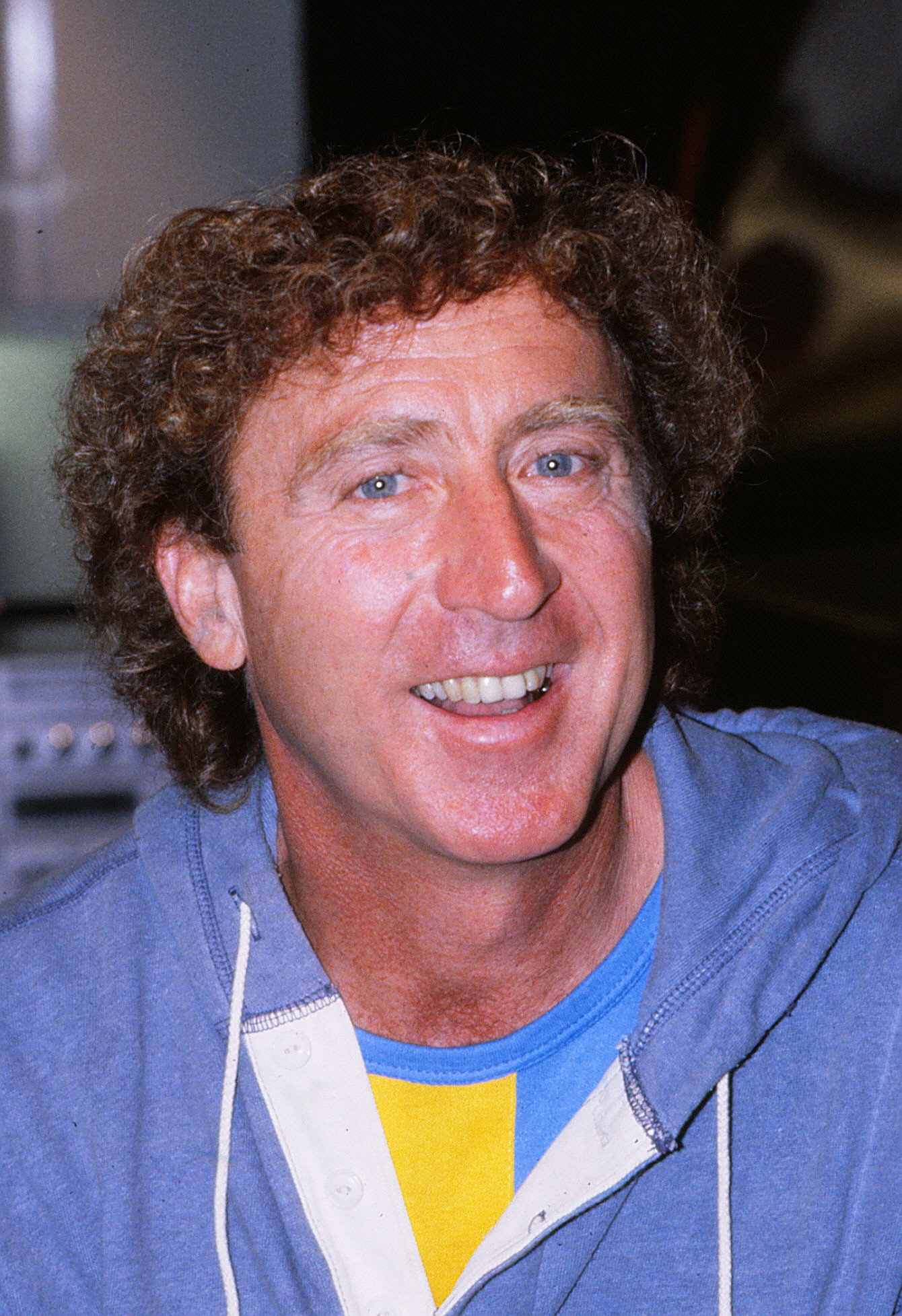
Richard Pryor (pictured in 1986) and Gene Wilder (1984)
- Richard Pryor as Eddie Dash
- Gene Wilder as George/Abe Fielding
- Mercedes Ruehl as Elaine
- Stephen Lang as Rupert Dibbs
- Vanessa Williams as Gloria
- Vincent Schiavelli as Dentist
- Craig Richard Nelson as Walt
- Kevin Pollak as Phil
- Phil Rubenstein as Al
- Michael J. Pollard as Brad, uncredited

== Production ==
The film was released five years after Pryor revealed that he had been diagnosed with multiple sclerosis, and his physical deterioration is evident in this film. Pryor said that he "got personally and professionally fucked on that film. They fired the director and hired another ego. I was told I wasn't going to have to reshoot scenes but the new ego had me do it anyway. That's when I discovered things weren't going well for me professionally."

Peter Bogdanovich was the original director, but was replaced after five weeks of shooting in New York. On the last night of location filming, he received a phone call from his agent near midnight letting him know that he was being replaced. After reviewing footage with the replacement director, it was determined that none of the New York footage was usable, and the script was rewritten to be shot entirely in Los Angeles. The movie was shot and completed in Los Angeles, and none of Bogdanovich's footage was used. Coincidentally, Bogdanovich had also been an early candidate to direct Silver Streak, Wilder and Pryor's first film pairing, but was ousted in favor of Arthur Hiller.

In 2016, on Gilbert Gottfried's podcast (Gilbert Gottfried's Amazing Colossal Podcast!), Bogdanovich described how he and Gene Wilder did not get along because Bogdanovich devoted most of his time and energy to Richard Pryor due to his health issues. Although Bogdanovich claimed that the film had been greenlit only because he had gotten Pryor involved (the studio apparently did not want Wilder to star alone), he believed that it was Wilder who successfully campaigned to have him replaced with another director. Gottfried was cast in the Bogdanovich version of the film, but he was dropped when it was reshot. Also among Bogdanovich's unused, and presumably lost, footage was a cameo featuring Donald Trump.

== Reception ==
Another You was a box-office failure. It ranks among the top thirty widely released films for having the biggest second weekend drop at the box office, dropping 78.1% from $1,537,965 to $334,836. It has a 5% rating on Rotten Tomatoes, based on 21 reviews. The consensus summarizes: "So stubbornly unfunny that not even a reunited Richard Pryor and Gene Wilder are enough to give it a spark, Another You is worse than none at all." Audiences surveyed by CinemaScore gave the film a grade of "C" on a scale of A+ to F.

Stephen Holden of The New York Times called the film "a frantically incoherent comedy" with a screenplay that "jabbers along in ways that even Mr. Wilder, who carries the brunt of the dialogue, cannot make amusing. Mr. Pryor's role is paltry and his dialogue scant. When all else fails, he is reduced to repeating obscenities."

Joseph McBride of Variety wrote that "producer Ziggy Steinberg's feeble script is given slapdash direction by the man who replaced Peter Bogdanovich on what is billed 'a film by Maurice Phillips' (the best joke in the film)... Though Pryor shows old flashes of his old comic brilliance and charm, it's painful to see how his health problems have affected him in this role."

Michael Wilmington of the Los Angeles Times wrote, "Producer-writer Ziggy Steinberg's script is like a stone tied around the movie's neck that sinks it, despite all those gaudy, glossy balloons pulling it up."

Gene Siskel of the Chicago Tribune gave the film half of one star out of four, calling it a "completely worthless comedy" with "no laughs".
