= The Absent-Minded Waiter =

1977 American comedy short film

- Directed by: Carl Gottlieb
- Written by: Steve Martin
- Produced by: William E. McEuen
- Starring: Steve Martin; Buck Henry; Teri Garr
- Music by: Marvin Hamlisch
- Production company: Aspen Film Society
- Distributed by: Paramount Pictures
- Release date: July 13, 1977
- Running time: 7 minutes
- Country: United States
- Language: English

The Absent-Minded Waiter is a 1977 American comedy short film starring Steve Martin, Buck Henry and Teri Garr. It was written by Martin and directed by Carl Gottlieb. The film was produced by William E. McEuen, who would go on to produce Steve Martin's next six films.

The short was screened as part of "The Best of the Shorts" program at Filmex on March 26, 1977 and was also shown at Martin's stand-up shows before he went on. It was nominated for the Academy Award for Best Live Action Short Film at the 1977 Academy Awards.

== Plot ==
A couple (Henry and Garr) have gone out to dinner at a fancy restaurant the husband claims has the world's most absent-minded waiter. Steven is a poor waiter. He has many mishaps, including pouring water before placing down the glasses, forcing the couple to repeat their order of "two martinis" three times, and subsequently bringing them six martinis. The wife soon becomes angry that she got dressed up, hired a babysitter and then was brought out to a restaurant with such amazingly bad service. The husband pleads with her: "Trust me... trust me." Immediately afterwards, the waiter returns with their "change"—$10,000 worth—before the couple had even paid. As they gleefully get up from their chairs to leave, the waiter comes back to ask, "Two for dinner?" to which the wife quickly responds, "Yes, two please," and the couple then sits right back down at their table.

== Cast ==
- Steve Martin as Steven, the Waiter
- Buck Henry as Bernie Cates
- Teri Garr as Susan Cates
- Ivor Barry as Carl, the Maitre D'
- Naomi Stevens as Naomi, the Cashier

== Home media ==
The short was included on the 1993 VHS release of the special Steve Martin Live and on the 2012 DVD box set Steve Martin: The Television Stuff.
