= Symphonion Dream =

Studio album by Nitty Gritty Dirt Band
- Released: September 1975
- Recorded: 1975
- Genre: Country rock; bluegrass; country
- Length: 42:55
- Label: United Artists
- Producer: William E. McEuen

Nitty Gritty Dirt Band chronology
Stars & Stripes Forever (1974)	Symphonion Dream (1975)	Dirt, Silver and Gold (1976)

Professional ratings
Review scores
Source	Rating
Allmusic	3/5 stars
Rolling Stone	(unfavorable)

Symphonion Dream is the ninth album by American country music band The Nitty Gritty Dirt Band. They were joined by guest musicians Leon Russell and Linda Ronstadt, along with actor Gary Busey, who was credited as "Teddy Jack Eddy", and played various percussion instruments.

== Track listing ==
1. "Winter White (Wind Harp)" (Jimmie Fadden) – 1:17
2. "Raleigh-Durham Reel" (John McEuen, Jeff Hanna, James Ibbotson, Jimmie Fadden) – 3:31
3. "The Battle of New Orleans" (Jimmy Driftwood) – 3:55
4. "Bayou Jubilee" (Jeff Hanna) – 2:47
5. "Sally Was a Goodun" (John McEuen, Jeff Hanna, James Ibbotson, Jimmie Fadden) – 0:44
6. "Hey Good Lookin'" (Hank Williams) – 1:50
7. "Classical Banjo 1/Malaguena/Classical Banjo 2" (John McEuen, Ernesto Lecuona) – 3:27
8. "Daddy Was a Sailor" (Jimmie Fadden) – 2:54
9. "Sleeping on the Beach" (Jimmie Fadden) – 1:32
10. "Santa Monica Pier" (John McEuen) – 2:50
11. "Ripplin' Waters" (James Ibbotson) – 5:55
12. "All I Have to Do is Dream" (Boudleaux Bryant, Felice Bryant) – 3:51
13. "Mother of Love" (Ken Edwards) – 2:43
14. "The Moon Just Turned Blue" (JD Souther) – 2:43
15. "Got To Travel On" (Paul Clayton, Larry Ehrlich, Dave Lazar) – 1:05
16. "Joshua Come Home" (James Ibbotson) – 3:32
17. "Solstice (Wind Harp)" (James Ibbotson) – 1:24
18. "Symphonion Montage" (James Ibbotson) – :54

== Personnel ==
The Band

- John McEuen – guitar, banjo, fiddle, mandolin, steel guitar, vocals
- Jimmie Fadden – guitar, harmonica, drums, vocals
- Jeff Hanna – guitar, drums, vocals
- Jimmy Ibbotson – guitar, bass, keyboards, drums, vocals

Contributing Artists

- Les Thompson – bass, guitar, vocals
- Leon Russell – piano, keyboards, synthesizer, drums, chimes, gourd, vocals
- Linda Ronstadt – vocals
- Gary Busey – drums, timbales, bells, cowbell
- Paul Harris – piano
- Alice McEuen – background vocals
- Kae McEuen – background vocals
- Rae Hanna – background vocals
- Jim Ratts – background vocals
- Mary McCreary – background vocals
- Mary Stevens – background vocals

== Production ==
- Producer: William E. McEuen
- Recording Engineer: Richie Cicero/Michael Denecke/Gary Mullen
- Mixing: William E. McEuen/Baker Bigsby
- Art Direction: n/a
- Liner Notes: John Tobler
