= The Triangle Factory Fire Scandal =

- Genre: Drama
- Written by: Mel Brez; Ethel Brez
- Directed by: Mel Stuart
- Starring: David Dukes; Tovah Feldshuh; Lauren Frost; Stacey Nelkin; Ted Wass
- Music by: Walter Scharf
- Country of origin: United States
- Original language: English

Production
- Executive producers: Merrill Grant; Don Kirshner; Alan Landsburg
- Producer: Paul Freeman
- Production location: New York City
- Cinematography: Matthew F. Leonetti
- Editor: Corky Ehlers
- Running time: 98 minutes
- Production companies: Alan Landsburg Productions; Don Kirshner Productions

Original release
- Network: NBC
- Release: January 30, 1979

The Triangle Factory Fire Scandal is a 1979 American television movie directed by Mel Stuart and starring David Dukes, Tovah Feldshuh, Lauren Frost, Stacey Nelkin, Tom Bosley and Ted Wass. It premiered on NBC on January 30, 1979.

The film chronicles the Triangle Shirtwaist Factory fire of March 25, 1911, in which 146 garment workers died and which spurred the growth of the International Ladies' Garment Workers' Union.

The film was nominated for three Emmy awards, and won for Outstanding Achievement in Hairstyling.

== Plot ==
On Friday, March 24, 1911, the Triangle factory workers, who labored on the eighth, ninth and tenth floor of a supposedly fire-safe building, are shown working in unsafe conditions on the eighth floor. A hanging light above four sewing machines keeps going out, and the electrical wires are smoking. A seamstress stands up, taps on the metal light shade, and the light comes back on, but Mr. Feldman, a foreman, yells at her for not working. Lou, one of the fabric cutters, pushes fabric scraps off the cutting table, into an overflowing waste bin, and pieces drop to the floor. Feldman comes over, yells about scraps on the floor, and Lou says they need to have the scraps removed, for they are a safety hazard. He also states he knows a bribe was paid to the fire marshal. Feldman tells him to stop causing trouble.

Workers talk about going to that evening’s engagement party for Vinnie, a mechanic, and Connie, a seamstress. Though about to be married Vinnie flirts with Gina, a new worker. Sonya wants to go to the party, but she is Jewish, and has to go to temple that evening. Her friend Florence, who wants to marry a millionaire, tells her she can tell her family she is sick, and then sneak off to the party.

When the work day ends the inside factory doors are unlocked, and the women workers line up to have their handbags searched before they can leave. Mr. Feldman reports to the factory owners how much work was produced that day. One of the owners complains about the high cost of doing business, and he includes the bribes regularly paid to the police, safety and fire inspectors as one of his costly expenses.

That evening, at temple, Sonya tells her mother she isn’t feeling well, and she is told to go home and rest. She instead goes to the engagement party, which is taking place outside of Connie’s apartment building. When her family is walking home they see her dancing in the street with a gentile. Her father is angry at her for going against her Jewish upbringing, but Sonya reminds him that if she wasn’t working on the Sabbath the family would starve, and her brother would not be attending college.

At the party Lou talks of wanting to unionize the garment factory, but his sweetheart, Rose, is more interested in finding a man with a better job. She leaves the party early for Bessie, a matchmaker, has arranged for her to meet a business owner. The man is interested in Rose, but she doesn’t like him.

On Saturday, March 25, the Triangle factory seamstresses must work until four o’clock to get in the fifty-six hours needed to earn nine dollars a week. The doors are locked so that no one can sneak out for a break, or steal anything. Selma, an older seamstress with aching hands, is unable to meet her daily quota of work, and Mr. Feldman wants to fire her, but Lou goes around the work room and asks seamstresses to donate sewn sleeves, to allow Selma to reach her quota. He tells them that unity is strength. Feldman says he will tell the owners what Lou has done.

The wiring on the bad light starts sparking, and then the wire catches fire. Some burning matter falls into a scrap bin, and the fabric scraps catch fire. When the fire is discovered workers try to put it out with pails of sand, then Mr. Feldman orders the male workers to get out the fire hose. It’s discovered that the hose was never connected to a water line. As the fire spreads some of the locked doors are opened, but one door is jammed, and can’t be used. A telephone call is made to the tenth floor to have the workers evacuated, but there is no telephone on the ninth floor, so those workers weren’t told of the fire.

Horse-drawn fire engines arrive and the firemen begin fighting the blaze.

Some workers are able to escape using the freight elevator, some run through the fire to the stairwells. Florence is trapped by fire and is standing on a work table. Although Sonya tries to calm her down and help her escape Florence loses her balance and falls through the window behind her to her death. As the fire becomes more intense many women fear burning to death, jump out the windows, and die from their fall. Some workers, including Mr. Feldman and his visiting daughter, climb up to the tenth floor, then get onto the roof. Workers in a neighboring building push a ladder out a window until it reaches the burning building’s rooftop. Trapped workers are able to crawl across the ladder to safety.

Vinnie is killed by an explosion caused by the fire. Lou is hurt by falling debris and can’t move. Rose kneels beside him and refuses to leave. They begin praying in Hebrew as they await death. Sonya, Connie and Gina are shown escaping the building.

A narrator states that the fire burned for twenty minutes. One hundred forty-six people died, including more than fifty who jumped to their deaths. Twenty-three lawsuits were filed, which resulted in seventy-five dollars being paid out for each worker who died. The fire helped increase membership in the International Ladies Garment Workers Union.

Soon after the fire Sonya, Connie and Gina take part in the annual Easter Parade. The narrator states the survivors carried on by remembering the credo brought from other lands – Life must go on.

== Cast ==
- David Dukes as Lou Ribin
- Janet Margolin as Rose
- Tovah Feldshuh as Florence
- Lauren Frost as Sonya Levin
- Stacey Nelkin as Gina
- Ted Wass as Vinnie
- Stephanie Zimbalist as Connie
- Tom Bosley as Morris Feldman
- Charlotte Rae as Bessie

== See also ==
- List of firefighting films
