= Max Williams (actor) =

Canadian film and television actor

- Born: Max E. Williams; Canada
- Occupation: Actor
- Notable work: Bullet in the Face

Max E. Williams is a Canadian film and television actor best known for his lead role in the IFC television series Bullet in the Face. Williams played Jack Nicholson in the HBO drama Winning Time: The Rise of the Lakers Dynasty. A scene was filmed in which Williams, as Nicholson, mooned Boston Celtics fans at the Boston Garden but was deleted because, according to director and producer Salli Richardson-Whitfield, "it felt a little bit too comical."
