= Kate Kelton =

Canadian actress

- Born: June 20, 1978 (age 47); Bamberg, West Germany
- Occupations: Artist, model and actress

Kate Kelton (born June 20, 1978) is a Canadian film and television actress and an artist, who had a recurring role on Syfy's Haven from 2012 to 2013. Kelton has also had leading roles in music videos as well as a long-running international commercial for Tic Tac.

== Personal life and education ==
Kelton was born in Bamberg, West Germany to Czech parents. Her mother is an artist and her adopted father was an architect. Kelton is the great-granddaughter of Czech architect Josef Fanta. Settling in Toronto when she was seven, Kelton attended the Etobicoke School of the Arts and received a Bachelor of Applied Arts in film from Ryerson University. She began her career as an artist before moving into acting.

== Art career ==
Kelton's artwork is exhibited internationally, including at La Luz de Jesus Gallery and Gallery1988 in Los Angeles and New York, and Galerie F in Chicago. She has posed for artist Jason Shawn Alexander in the lead role of Corrine for his comic book series, Empty Zone. Kelton is a contributing author to Making It in High Heels: Inspiring Stories by Women for Women of All Ages. In 2019, her series SENTRY debuted in Los Angeles at Cactus Gallery. The series takes embellishments of a Prague train station designed by her great-grandfather, Josef Fanta, and combines these with portraits of women who came forward about sexual harassment and abuse in the entertainment industry- theSilence Breakers.

== Commercial career ==
Kelton played the "Tic Tac Girl" appearing in Tic Tac mints television commercials for almost a decade throughout Canada, Australia, South Africa and Israel.

=== Film ===
Kelton's feature film debut was in Harold & Kumar Go to White Castle. Kelton has also appeared in several independent films.

Year	Title	Role	Notes
2002	American Psycho 2	Clara	Video
2003	The Republic of Love	Mother #1	
2004	Eden's Wake	Mary	Short
2004	Harold & Kumar Go to White Castle	Christy	
2005	The Chick Magnet	Betty	Short
2005	The Last Hit	Amanda	
2005	Cake	Tralee	
2006	The Last Woman on Earth	Hannah	Short
2008	The Museum	Abby	Short
2010	Growth	Gina	
2011	Detention	Madison / Slashing Beauty	
2012	The Longer Day of Happiness	Veronica	

=== Television ===
Her first series leading role on television was opposite Eric Roberts and Eddie Izzard, as Martine, in IFC's Bullet in the Face.

Year	Title	Role	Notes
2002	Spynet	Carmen	"Sugar Mountain"
2005	The Eleventh Hour	Charlotte Gish	"Bumpy Cover"
2005	Wild Card	Angie	"See Ya Later, Investigator!"
2010	Suitemates	Melanie McPherson	Main role
2012	Bullet in the Face	Martine Mahler	TV miniseries
2012–2013	Haven	Jordan McKee	Recurring role
2015	HOARS (Home Owner Association Regency Supreme)	PanAm	"No Multi-colored, Non-specific or Specific Holiday Lights 67(Ooh)"

== Music video ==
Kelton starred in numerous music videos, including Shaggy's "It Wasn’t Me" and Eric Clapton’s "Can’t Let You Do It."
