= Dirt, Silver and Gold =

Compilation album by Nitty Gritty Dirt Band
- Released: 1976
- Genre: Country, country rock, folk rock, bluegrass
- Length: 1:48:48
- Label: Liberty Records//BGO Records
- Producer: William McEuen

Nitty Gritty Dirt Band chronology
Symphonion Dream (1975)	Dirt, Silver and Gold (1976)	The Dirt Band (1978)

Dirt, Silver and Gold is a 1976 compilation album by The Nitty Gritty Dirt Band that contains some of the band's greatest material to that point. It also includes 12 songs not previously available. It was originally released as a three LP album, and was released in 2003 as a two compact disc set by BGO Records.

The original release reached 77 on the US Charts and 28 on the US Country Charts.

The album's outer cover opens up to a picture of an elaborately painted safe door from the Ute City Banque in Aspen, Colorado. The original album had a four foot by two foot poster of the safe. The inside cover has pictures of the band in its three incarnations to that point, 1966–67, 1968–69 and 1970–76. The inner sleeves also had artwork. One side has tools for mining gold and a 45 record with a mountain on the label. The other side had a poster for the Society Of California Pioneers. The liner notes were written over these images on two of the sleeves.

== Track listing ==
=== Disc one ===
LP side 1

1. "Buy For Me The Rain" (Copeland/Noonan) – 2:23 – recorded December 1966
  from The Nitty Gritty Dirt Band
2. "Melissa" (Jackson Browne) – 2:18 – recorded December 1966
  from The Nitty Gritty Dirt Band
3. "Collegiana" (McHugh/Fields) – 2:34 – recorded December 1967
  from Rare Junk
4. "Mournin' Blues" (Sbarbaro) – 3:47 – recorded December 1967
  from Rare Junk
5. "Willie The Weeper" (Rymal/Melrose/Bloom) – 2:22 – recorded January 1968
  from Rare Junk

LP side 2

1. "Uncle Charlie Interview" – 1:39 – recorded November 1968
  from Uncle Charlie & His Dog Teddy
2. "Mr. Bojangles" (Jerry Jeff Walker) – 3:25 – recorded November 1969
  from Uncle Charlie & His Dog Teddy
3. "Some Of Shelly's Blues" (Nesmith) – 3:02 – recorded August 1969
  from Uncle Charlie & His Dog Teddy
4. "The Cure" (Jeff Hanna) – 2:04 – recorded September 1969
  from Uncle Charlie & His Dog Teddy
5. "House At Pooh Corner" (Kenny Loggins) – 2:37 – recorded October 1969
  from Uncle Charlie & His Dog Teddy
6. "Randy Lynn Rag" (Earl Scruggs) – 1:46 – recorded November 1969
  from Uncle Charlie & His Dog Teddy
7. "Clemente Opus 36 (John)" (John McEuen) – 1:40 – recorded April 1970
  from Uncle Charlie & His Dog Teddy
8. "Livin' Without You" (Newman) – 2:01 – recorded May 1970
  from Uncle Charlie & His Dog Teddy

LP side 3

1. "Sixteen Tracks" (Hanna/Jimmy Ibbotson) – 5:11 – recorded August 1971
  from All the Good Times
2. "Fish Song" (Jimmy Fadden) – 4:26 – recorded June 1971
  from All the Good Times
3. "Creepin' Round Your Back Door" (Fadden) – 2:52 – recorded September 1971
  from All the Good Times
4. "Honky Tonkin'" (Hank Williams) – 2:24 – recorded August 1971
  from Will the Circle Be Unbroken
5. "Togary Mountain" (McEuen) – 2:27 – recorded August 1971
  from Will the Circle Be Unbroken
6. "Soldier's Joy" (Scruggs/McEuen) – 2:09 – recorded August 1971
  from Will the Circle Be Unbroken

=== Disc two ===
LP side 4

1. "Ripplin' Waters" (Ibbotson) – 5:49 – recorded February 1975
  from Symphonion Dream
2. "You Are My Flower" (A.P. Carter) 3:34 – recorded August 1971
  from Will the Circle Be Unbroken
3. "The Battle of New Orleans" (Jimmie Driftwood) 3:21 – recorded January 1973
  from Symphonion Dream
4. "All I Have To Do Is Dream" (Felice and Boudleaux Bryant) – 3:49 – recorded February 1975
  from Symphonion Dream
5. "Rocky Top" (Bryant/Bryant) – 2:12 – recorded February 1975
  Previously unreleased
6. "Gavotte No. 2" (Arranged by McEuen) – 1:34 – recorded June 1976
  Previously unreleased

LP side 5

1. "Jamaica Lady" (Holster) – 4:12 – recorded June 1976
  Previously unreleased
2. "Mother Earth (Provides For Me)" (Kaz) – 3:26 – recorded June 1976
  Previously unreleased
3. "Falling Down Slow" (Fadden) – 3:13 – recorded June 1976
  Previously unreleased
4. "Bowleg's" (Hanna) – 4:13 – recorded June 1976
  Previously unreleased
5. "Doc's Guitar" (Doc Watson) – 1:32 – recorded June 1976
  Previously unreleased

LP side 6

1. "Bayou Jubilee/Sally Was A Goodun" (Hanna/McEuen/Fadden/Ibbotson) – 3:03 – recorded February 1975
  from Symphonion Dream
2. "Cosmic Cowboy, Part 1" (Murphey) – 3:58 – recorded June 1976
  Previously unreleased
3. "Win Or Lose" (McEuen) – 3:35 – recorded June 1976
  Previously unreleased
4. "Woody Woodpecker" (Tiddles/Idriss) – 1:09 – recorded April 1973
  Previously unreleased
5. "Visiting An Old Friend" (Kelly) – 1:53 – recorded June 1976
  Previously unreleased
6. "Will the Circle Be Unbroken" (Carter) – 4:51 – recorded August 1971
  from Will the Circle Be Unbroken
7. "Foggy Mountain Breakdown" (Scruggs) – 2:36 – recorded August 1971
  Previously unreleased

== Personnel ==
The Dirt Band 1966–1967

- Ralph Barr
- Jimmie Fadden
- Jeff Hanna
- Bruce Kunkle
- Les Thompson
- John McEuen

The Dirt Band 1968–1969

- John McEuen
- Jimmie Fadden
- Jeff Hanna
- Chris Darrow
- Les Thompson
- Ralph Barr

The Dirt Band 1970–1976

- Jeff Hanna
- John McEuen
- Jimmie Fadden
- Les Thompson
- Jim Ibbotson
- Jackie Clark
- John Cable

Contributing Players

- Jim Gordon
- Russ Kunkel
- Byron Berline
- Johnny Sandlin
- Michel Rubini
- Maury Manseau
- Earl, Gery and Randy Scruggs
- Norman Blake
- Vassar Clements
- Doc Watson
- Roy "Junior" Huskey
- Bernie Mysior
- Bobby Carpenter
- Bobby Mason
- Brian Savage
- David James Holster
- Hayden Gregg

Will The Circle Be Unbroken vocalists

- Mother Maybelle Carter
- Jimmy Martin
- Roy Acuff

== Production ==
Production, art direction, design – William McEuen
