= Jo Jo Dancer, Your Life Is Calling =

1986 film by Richard Pryor

- Theatrical release poster
- Directed by: Richard Pryor
- Written by: Paul Mooney; Richard Pryor; Rocco Urbisci
- Produced by: Richard Pryor
- Starring: Richard Pryor
- Cinematography: John A. Alonzo
- Edited by: Donn Cambern
- Music by: Herbie Hancock
- Production company: Indigo Productions
- Distributed by: Columbia Pictures
- Release date: May 2, 1986
- Running time: 97 minutes
- Country: United States
- Language: English
- Budget: $20 million
- Box office: $18,034,150

Jo Jo Dancer, Your Life Is Calling is a 1986 American biographical comedy-drama film directed, produced by and starring Richard Pryor, who also wrote the screenplay with Paul Mooney and Rocco Urbisci. Jo Jo Dancer, Your Life Is Calling was Richard Pryor's first and only directorial effort, although he is credited as such on the screen version of his 1983 stand-up comedy concert film.

== Background ==
Pryor plays Jo Jo Dancer, a popular stand-up comedian, who has severely burned himself while freebasing cocaine. The film came out six years after Pryor had set himself on fire while freebasing.

== Plot ==
As Dancer lies hospitalized in a coma, his spiritual alter ego revisits his life, from growing up in a brothel as a child and struggling to beat the long odds to become a top-rated comedian. However, his success leads to extensive drug use and womanizing that takes its toll on his life. It affects every relationship, including his marriages. Jo Jo's spirit watches and attempts to convince his past self to end the cycle of self-destruction.

== Cast ==
- Richard Pryor as Jo Jo Dancer
  - E'Lon Cox as Jo Jo Dancer (child)
- Paula Kelly as Satin Doll
- Art Evans as Arturo
- Barbara Williams as Dawn
- Fay Hauser as Grace
- Billy Eckstine as Johnny Barnett
- Diahnne Abbott as Mother
- Carmen McRae as Grandmother
- Debbie Allen as Michelle
- Tanya Boyd as Alicia
- Wings Hauser as Cliff
- Michael Ironside as Detective Lawrence
- Scoey Mitchell as Father
- Dennis Hayden as Policeman #1
- Dennis Farina as Freddy

== Production ==
The earlier parts of the film were shot in Pryor's hometown of Peoria, Illinois.

In 1986, the New York Amsterdam News asked Pryor, "'Why a Jo Jo Dancer?' Was it a form of exorcism, did he want to do it for drama's sake or did he hope to cop some awards?" Pryor replied, "I think I did it for two of those reasons. It was like an exorcism for me and a drama. I wanted to make a film as entertaining as it could be, while telling a story which parallels my life. It was a film I had to do. There was nothing else I could do. I had to do this to go on with my life and do, hopefully, what I would consider to be some of the best work in my life from now on."

== Reception ==
Jo Jo Dancer, Your Life Is Calling received mixed reviews from critics. It currently has a 55% "Rotten" rating on the movie review aggregator site Rotten Tomatoes based on 20 reviews.

The New York Daily World wrote: "Pryor...has undertaken an incredibly ambitious and personally challenging task here, in an effort to come to terms with his drug and alcohol addiction and self-destructiveness which nearly cost him his life. The result is a sincere, imaginative and impassioned piece that bears the mark of a man who has broad decision-making creative control over his work. This factor, which accounts for the film's strengths, is, however, also the source of its weaknesses. Jo Jo Dancer's content is often too close to Pryor's subjective feelings and responses, lacking the kind of psychological distance necessary for analysis, reflection, and insight that probes the depth of the narrative....The film only touches the surfaces of his life, of the related racial issues, and of the social content of his public performances, leaving audiences stirred, but hungry for much more.

The Pittsburgh Courier proclaimed the film "a bonafide award winner....without question, Pryor's finest work ever. Those who have followed the path of his controversial-but-successful career will agree. 'Jo Jo' seems to answer any questions we've ever imagined as to why Richard Pryor is the way he is....Additionally, the entire supporting cast in the film performs flawlessly. Stunning performances are offered by a couple of legends who earned their distinction in another artform...Carmen McRae and Billy Eckstine....Other shining performances are offered by Debbi Allen, Fay Hauser, and Barbara Williams....For Richard Pryor, the film makes up for all the recent goofy, non-humorous films he has starred in."
