= Like Mom, Like Me =

1978 American made-for-television movie

- Main title
- Genre: Drama
- Based on: Like Mom, Like Me by Sheila Schwartz (Note: This author was not Sheila Schwartz, the writer and creative writing professor.)
- Written by: Nancy Lynn Schwartz
- Directed by: Michael Pressman
- Starring: Linda Lavin; Kristy McNichol
- Music by: Lee Holdridge
- Country of origin: United States
- Original language: English

Production
- Producer: Nancy Malone
- Cinematography: Brianne Murphy
- Editor: Millie Moore
- Running time: 100 minutes
- Production company: CBS Entertainment Production

Original release
- Network: CBS
- Release: October 22, 1978

Like Mom, Like Me is a 1978 American made-for-television drama film directed by Michael Pressman. The film was based on the novel of the same name written by Sheila Schwartz, and the screenplay was written by her daughter Nancy Lynn Schwartz.

== Plot ==
Althea is the mother of teenager Jennifer. Althea's husband leaves her; this has a horrible influence on her relationship with her daughter. When Althea starts to date other men, Jennifer can't accept this. Meanwhile, Althea is irritated by Jennifer taking over her own habits.

== Cast ==
- Linda Lavin - Althea Gruen
- Kristy McNichol - Jennifer Gruen
- Max Gail - Henry Millen
- Stacey Nelkin - Tao Wolf
- Michael LeClair - Peter
- Lawrence Pressman - Michael Gruen
- Patrick O'Neal - Philip Stanford
- Michele Laurita - Mellissa
