= The Nutt House =

- Genre: Sitcom
- Created by: Mel Brooks; Alan Spencer
- Written by: Bruce Bilson; Mel Brooks; Alicia Marie Schudt; Alan Spencer
- Directed by: Gary Nelson
- Starring: Cloris Leachman; Harvey Korman; Brian McNamara; Molly Hagan; Gregory Itzin; Mark Blankfield
- Theme music composer: Lance Rubin
- Country of origin: United States
- Original language: English
- No. of seasons: 1
- No. of episodes: 11 (5 unaired in U.S.)

Production
- Executive producer: Alan Spencer
- Producer: Mel Brooks
- Camera setup: Multi-camera
- Running time: 30 minutes
- Production companies: Brooksfilms Television; Alan Spencer Productions; Touchstone Television

Original release
- Network: NBC
- Release: September 20 – October 25, 1989

The Nutt House is an American sitcom television series that aired for five episodes on NBC from September 20 to October 25, 1989.

== Overview ==
The Nutt House was the creation of executive producers Mel Brooks and Alan Spencer and was a broad farce about a once-prestigious New York City hotel, which had of late fallen on hard times, due in part to it being named for the proprietress, Edwina Nutt (Cloris Leachman). Other characters included manager Reginald Tarkington (Harvey Korman), and head of housekeeping Ms. Frick (also portrayed by Leachman). Frick appeared in every episode, Mrs. Nutt only in the pilot.

The Nutt House was a broad satire, described by cast member Molly Hagan as "Police Squad! meets Fawlty Towers". The main storyline for each and every episode was periodically interrupted by short, unrelated, often surreal gags. Its audience was quite a narrow one, and it was cancelled within 6 weeks of its premiere. However, all 11 of the produced episodes were broadcast on BBC 2 in the United Kingdom, where it became a moderate success being shown on Saturday evening following Clive James' Saturday Night Clive. Brooks appeared on this program to promote the first episode of The Nutt House on 14 October 1989. However, to the dismay of viewers, the BBC did not give the show a fixed airtime. Usually shown around 23.00 hours (but sometimes as late as 23.30), the final episode inexplicably aired at 19.30 on 16 December 1989.

== Cast ==
- Cloris Leachman as Ms. Frick (also Edwina Nutt in the pilot episode)
- Harvey Korman as Reginald Tarkington
- Brian McNamara as Charles Nutt III
- Molly Hagan as Sally Lonnaneck
- Gregory Itzin as Dennis
- Mark Blankfield as Freddy

== Episodes ==
No.	Title	Directed by	Written by	Original release date	Viewers (millions)
1 2	"Pilot"	Gary Nelson	Mel Brooks & Alan Spencer	September 20, 1989	23.0
When Big Jake Herder (David Huddleston) of the powerful Texplex hotel chain announces his intention to purchase the failing Nutt House hotel, proprietress Edwina Nutt calls on her ne'er-do-well grandson, Charles Nutt III, to intervene. Upon his arrival, Charles finds a female guest stuck in a phone booth, a nearly-blind elevator operator, and discovers that hotel manager Reginald Tarkington has a fake guest list with 600 names on it -- a list he's been fudging for the past several years. Meanwhile, Big Jake's top buyer, Shrike (John de Lancie), gets more than he bargained for when he pays the Nutt House a visit.
3	"The Accidental Groom"	Bill Bixby	Alan Spencer	September 27, 1989	18.3
Agent Flynn (Mark L. Taylor), an immigration officer, informs Ms. Frick that she will be deported to Germany, unless she can marry a U.S. citizen within 24 hours. When it appears that Tarkington is the only available suitor, he and Frick set out to prove her first husband was an American.
4	"A Frick Called Wanda"	Bruce Bilson	Jim Geoghan	October 11, 1989	15.6
A younger woman named Gwen Goode (Beth Broderick) tries to seduce Tarkington, sending him into full mid-life crisis mode. A jealous Ms. Frick discovers that Gwen is working for the infamous criminal mastermind, Hans Grueblik (Michael Harris).
5	"21 Men and a Baby"	Bruce Bilson	Alicia Marie Schudt	October 18, 1989	20.7
Tarkington's favorite baseball team is in town, and their manager chooses the nearly-empty Nutt House for his team's accommodations in the hope that it is the quietest place in the city. Instead, a crying baby keeps the team's 21 players up all night. When the baby's mother leaves her child in Ms. Frick's care, Frick's long-suppressed motherly instincts are awakened.
6	"Suites, Lies and Videotape"	Roger Duchowny	Richard Day	October 25, 1989	17.2
The President of the United States is in town to make an appearance at the Gentile Haberdashers conference, and Charles hopes to lure him into staying in the presidential suite at The Nutt House. To do so, he asks the employees to produce and star in a promotional video for the hotel.
7	"When Charles Met Sally"	Bruce Bilson	Alan Spencer	Unaired	TBD
Newly-hired public relations manager, Marla (Beverly Leech), becomes Sally's rival for Charles' affections. When Marla makes Charles the star of a fashion show to be hosted at the hotel, Freddy and Ms. Frick intervene on behalf of Sally.
8	"A Night at the Reunion"	Art Wolff	TBD	Unaired	TBD
Tarkington's Roosevelt High Class of '49 is staying at the Nutt House while in town for a reunion. Reginald tries to hide the fact that he is the hotel's manager, instead pretending to be into big business to impress his high school rival and classmates, which include Pope John Paul II.
9	"To Tell the Truth"	Art Wolff	Mark Curtiss, Rod Ash	Unaired	TBD
Sally needs to raise $7,000 to get her mother's damaged nose fixed. Just as Tarkington announces he's won some cash, an acrobatic burglar and her brutish assistant rob The Nutt House's till.
10	"My Man Tarkington"	TBD	TBD	Unaired	TBD
Stuffy Englishman Alec Creed (Paxton Whitehead) supplants Tarkington as manager just in time for pay raise day. Creed fires Freddy, but the rest of the staff conspires against him to get Freddy's job back.
11	"The Nutt Cracker Suite"	TBD	TBD	Unaired	TBD
To further the growing peace between the USA and USSR, Sally invites the Kiev Ballet to stay at The Nutt House. But Sally has ulterior motives, as she's really longing to meet handsome Soviet dancer Mikael Nabokov.
