= Stars & Stripes Forever (album) =

Studio album by Nitty Gritty Dirt Band
- Released: June 1974
- Genre: Country, country rock, folk rock, bluegrass
- Length: 72:48
- Label: United Artists
- Producer: William E. McEuen

Nitty Gritty Dirt Band chronology
Will the Circle Be Unbroken (1972)	Stars & Stripes Forever (1974)	Symphonion Dream (1975)

Professional ratings
Review scores
Source	Rating
AllMusic	4.5/5 stars

Stars & Stripes Forever is the eighth album from Nitty Gritty Dirt Band.

== Track listing ==
[some material was recorded with audience and friends at Woodland Studio's, Nashville, Tennessee]

1. "Jambalaya (On the Bayou)" (Hank Williams) – 1:43
2. "Dirt Band Interview" – 3:39
3. "Cosmic Cowboy (Part 1)" (Michael Martin Murphey) – 3:21
4. "Aluminum Record Award / Jeff Hanna – 1:31
5. "Fish Song" (Jimmie Fadden) – 3:50
6. "Mr. Bojangles" (Jerry Jeff Walker) – 3:46
7. "Vassar Clements Interview" – 3:56
8. "Listen to the Mockingbird" (Arranged & Adapt. by Millie Clements) – 2:47
9. "The Sheik of Araby" (Harry Beasley Smith, Ted Snyder, Francis Wheeler) – 2:08
10. "Resign Yourself to Me" (Casey Kelly) – 2:40
11. "Dixie Hoedown" (Jesse McReynolds, Jim McReynolds) – 2:27
12. "Cripple Creek" (Arr. & Adapt. by Millie Clements) – :54
13. "The Mountain Whippoorwill (or, How Hillbilly Jim Won the Great Fiddler's Prize") (Stephen V. Benet, Arranged & Adapt William McEuen) – 7:07
14. "Honky Tonkin'" (Hank Williams) – 2:00
15. "House at Pooh Corner" (Kenny Loggins) – 2:54
16. "Buy for Me the Rain" (Greg Copeland, Steve Noonan) – 2:32
17. "Oh Boy" (Sonny West, Bill Tilghman, Norman Petty) – 2:50
18. "Teardrops in my Eyes" (Tommy Sutton, Red Allen) – 2:11
19. "Glocoat-Blues" (Jimmie Fadden) – 3:11
20. "Stars and Stripes Forever" (Arranged & Adapt. by Jeff Hanna) – :38
21. "The Battle of New Orleans" (Jimmie Driftwood) – 2:58
22. "It Came From The 50s (Blast From The Past) / Jeff Hanna" (Jeff Hanna) – 6:45
23. "My True Story" (Eugene Pitt, Oscar Waltzer) – 3:08
24. "Diggy Liggy Lo" (Terry J. Clement) – 3:52

== Charts ==
Chart (1974)	Peak position
Australian (Kent Music Report)	93

== Personnel ==
- Jimmie Fadden
- Jeff Hanna
- Jim Ibbotson
- John McEuen

Special Guest Artists

- Vassar Clements
- Doug Journigan
- Les Thompson

== Production ==
- Producer - William E. McEuen
