= Sledge Hammer! =

American television crime comedy series (1986–1988)

- Cover of season 1 DVD collection
- Genre: Comedy
- Created by: Alan Spencer
- Starring: David Rasche; Anne-Marie Martin; Harrison Page
- Theme music composer: Danny Elfman
- Composers: Arthur B. Rubinstein; Arthur Kempel; Don Davis; Ron Grant; Lance Rubin; Richard Stone; David Spear; Ron Ramin
- Country of origin: United States
- Original language: English
- No. of seasons: 2
- No. of episodes: 41 (list of episodes)

Production
- Executive producers: William P. D'Angelo; Alan Spencer; Robert Lovenheim
- Producer: Thomas John Kane
- Cinematography: Chuck Colwell; Norman Leigh
- Editors: Janet Ashikaga; Briana London; Craig Ridenour; Peter V. White
- Camera setup: Single-camera
- Running time: 22–24 minutes
- Production companies: Alan Spencer Productions; D'Angelo Productions (1986–1987; season 1); New World Television

Original release
- Network: ABC
- Release: September 23, 1986 – February 12, 1988

Sledge Hammer! is an American satirical police sitcom produced by New World Television that ran for two seasons on ABC from September 23, 1986, to February 12, 1988. The series was created by Alan Spencer and stars David Rasche as Inspector Sledge Hammer, a caricature of the standard "cop on the edge" character.

== Episodes ==
Season	Episodes	Originally released	
Season	Episodes	First released	Last released
1	22	September 23, 1986	April 28, 1987
2	19	September 17, 1987	February 12, 1988

== Cast and characters ==
=== Main ===
- David Rasche as Inspector Sledge Hammer: The titular character of the series, he is stubborn, sexist, and reactionary (all of this by his own admission), but also a serious and respectful detective from the San Francisco Police Department. Hammer's most prized possession is his Smith & Wesson Model 29 .44 Magnum with a customized grip, featuring an engraving of a sledgehammer. Hammer sleeps and showers with his gun (which has its own satin pillow), and even talks to it (to which a character will reply "Who are you talking to?"), referring to it as his "amigo." He believes in shooting first and asking questions never. Unlike other comic crime fighters, Hammer is a blunderbuss that is effective and even capable of humanity on rare occasions. Spencer chose Rasche, since he was someone who was not already known as a comedian, but "someone that could make you believe that this man really was having a relationship with his gun". He drives a Dodge St. Regis.
- Anne-Marie Martin as Detective Dori Doreau: A sensitive, intelligent, and sophisticated police detective, she becomes Hammer's partner. In an interview with The A.V. Club, Spencer said he needed someone that the "audience would look up to, and adore, and like. And she was the validation for Sledge Hammer because Anne-Marie is such a wonderful actress—appealing person, sexy, with authority, and strong. And if she likes Sledge Hammer, that means he's okay, so she was kind of the insurance on screen. No matter what he was doing, as long as she liked him, believed in him, and was his partner, he was going to be okay". In season 2, Spencer was asked to develop her relationship more with Hammer as with ABC's flagship Moonlighting, but he preferred to have it be more like in Get Smart.
- Harrison Page as Captain Trunk: Hammer and Doreau's supervisor, he is regularly driven into fits of rage by Hammer's inconsiderate and brash attitude. Spencer related Page's portrayal to Louis Gossett's character in An Officer and a Gentlemen with regards to his yelling, and also Herbert Lom's character Inspector Dreyfus in The Pink Panther film series.

=== Recurring ===
- Leslie Morris as Officer Fletcher Majoy: desk sergeant at the precinct.
- Patti Tippo as Officer Daley: another officer at the precinct who is sometimes a friend to Doreau.
- Kurt Paul as Norman Blates: the precinct's medical examiner, he specializes in the sudden deceased at crime scenes. According to executive producer Alan Spencer, the character is an homage to Norman Bates, the character from Alfred Hitchcock's Psycho.
- Diane Sainte-Marie as Lisa Ellerblub: a local news anchorwoman (a play on Linda Ellerbee), she is usually on the receiving end of Hammer's chauvinistic insults.

=== Guest appearances ===
Some notable figures who made guest appearances on Sledge Hammer!:

- Adam Ant ("Icebreaker")
- Lewis Arquette ("Witless")
- Bill Bixby ("Hammer Hits the Rock"); also directed a number of episodes
- Mark Blankfield ("State of Sledge", "Comrade Hammer", and "The Secret of My Excess")
- Stanley Brock ("It Happened What Night?")
- Bud Cort ("Last of the Red Hot Vampires")
- Bill Dana ("Haven't Gun, Will Travel")
- John Densmore ("State of Sledge")
- Michael Des Barres ("Sledgepoo")
- Sarah Douglas ("Play It Again, Sledge")
- Norman Fell ("They Call Me Mr. Trunk")
- Conchata Ferrell ("Jagged Sledge")
- Dennis Fimple ("They Shoot Hammers, Don't They?" and "If I Had a Little Hammer")
- Kurt Fuller ("Hammer Hits the Rock")
- Sid Haig ("Hammeroid")
- Mark Holton ("The Secret of My Excess")
- Clint Howard ("State of Sledge")
- Brion James ("If I Had a Little Hammer" and "Model Dearest")
- Davy Jones ("Sledge, Rattle & Roll")
- Bernie Kopell ("Last of the Red Hot Vampires")
- Dan Lauria ("A Clockwork Hammer")
- Robin Leach ("The Spa Who Loved Me")
- Beverly Leech ("Wild About Hammer" and "A Clockwork Hammer")
- Lance LeGault ("The Spa Who Loved Me")
- David Leisure ("Hammer Hits the Rock" and "Magnum Farce")
- Floyd Levine ("They Shoot Hammers, Don't They?")
- Peter Marshall ("To Live and Die on TV")
- Rod McCary ("Desperately Seeking Dori")
- Richard Moll ("Hammeroid")
- Ronnie Schell ("Hammer Gets Nailed")
- Armin Shimerman ("Hammeroid")
- Don Stark ("Under the Gun" and "Sledgepoo")
- Brenda Strong ("Miss of the Spider Woman")
- John Vernon ("Under the Gun" – parodying his role in the first Dirty Harry film)
- Ray Walston ("Big Nazi on Campus")
- Patrick Wayne ("Brother Can You Spare a Crime")
- Duane Whitaker ("Hammer Gets Nailed")
- Mary Woronov ("The Spa Who Loved Me")

Actor and director Jackie Cooper directed a few episodes including "Witless", "All Shook Up" and the first-season finale, "The Spa Who Loved Me".

== Production history ==
Inspired by Clint Eastwood's no-nonsense approach to law enforcement in the Dirty Harry films, teenager Alan Spencer dreamed up the idea of a police officer whose approach was even more over-the-top, to the point of absurdity. At the age of 16, Spencer wrote a screenplay based on this idea. The script and the main character were both named Sledge Hammer.

Despite his youth, Spencer had already written for Rodney Dangerfield and such television shows as The Facts of Life and One Day at a Time. He sold his script upon the release of the fourth Dirty Harry movie, Sudden Impact. The popularity at the time of NBC's Dirty Harry-inspired action series Hunter suggested to HBO the potential of a similar but satirical police television show. When the company approached Leonard B. Stern, former producer of Get Smart, about developing such a show, Stern recommended Spencer's "Sledge Hammer!" idea. Stern knew of Spencer due to Spencer having helped Don Adams by personally writing a few gags for the comedian on the set of The Nude Bomb and was returning the favor.

Spencer quickly reworked his script for a half-hour television format. HBO executives wanted to produce the pilot and suggested casting ideas that Spencer found unacceptable, such as known comedians Rodney Dangerfield or Joe Piscopo in the lead role as opposed to a lesser known actor who would become the character. Last-place ABC was willing to take a chance on the unorthodox script. ABC insisted that the violence be toned down for network television and that a laugh track be included (although some versions – including the DVD release of the show – do not have this track or had it removed; Spencer found it offensive that the audience be told when to laugh and was furious over the decision), but agreed to cast Spencer's first choice for the lead character, the classically trained actor David Rasche. Sledge Hammer! entered ABC's fall lineup in 1986.

The pilot of Sledge Hammer! was completed just as Peter Gabriel's song "Sledgehammer" became a huge hit. ABC took advantage of this coincidence by using the song in television, radio, and film advertisements for the show. Spencer said Gabriel had been willing to license his song to the series and even rewrite the lyrics, but New World Television wouldn't meet the artist's terms. Nevertheless, Spencer was happy with what would be Danny Elfman's first TV theme.

The pilot places the series in San Francisco, California, featuring shots of the Golden Gate Bridge, San Francisco City Hall, and a building that is labelled San Francisco Police Department. However, Spencer stated that "we never said it was San Francisco because the city wanted nothing to do with this character." The police station building exterior is located in Los Angeles.

=== Intro and theme music ===
Image from introduction

The introduction to the show features long, near sensual closeup shots of Hammer's .44 Magnum as it rests on a luxurious satin pillow. The show's ominous theme music, composed by Danny Elfman, plays in the background. Hammer then picks up his gun, spins it expertly like a cinematic Old West gunslinger, and utters his catchphrase, "Trust me, I know what I'm doing", just before firing into the screen, making a hole in it. According to the DVD release extras, the original version had Hammer firing directly at the viewer, but ABC executives feared this could be too shocking, possibly even causing heart attacks (and leaving the network liable). Thus, Hammer fires into the screen at a slight angle.

According to the DVD release, Hammer's original catchphrase was "I'm crazy, but I know what I'm doing." ABC executives objected to a lead character being "crazy", so they insisted on a change. Spencer remarked that "it wound up working just as well and is probably funnier, because then he's not self-aware".

The DVD release uses an updated heavy metal version of the theme music by Baboon Rising on the main menus.

=== Ratings and second season ===
Despite critical acclaim and garnering high ratings in a special time slot just for the debut, Sledge Hammer! struggled in the ratings partly due to being repeatedly bounced around ABC's fall schedule. During the same season Sledge Hammer! made its debut, ABC scheduled a high-profile comeback vehicle for a then 75-year-old Lucille Ball entitled Life with Lucy that was not well received by critics or audiences. After only eight episodes aired, Ball's show was canceled and Sledge Hammer! was given her timeslot.

Sledge Hammer! attracted weekly viewership of 19 million viewers who followed the show religiously through its many time-slot shifts. The fact that the series had positive reviews and ratings, appealing to key target demographics also kept it on the schedule.

Because ABC intended to cancel the series, the last episode of the first season ends with Hammer accidentally destroying the city when he attempts to disarm a stolen nuclear warhead. This episode received much better-than-expected ratings, in large part because the network had moved the show to a better time slot. ABC executives changed their minds and renewed the show for a second season.

The second-season premiere perfunctorily explained that it and following episodes were set "five years before" the explosion, though Doreau is Sledge's partner in the second season, despite being introduced to him in the pilot, and despite the presence of references to contemporary events, rather than those of five years earlier.

The second season suffered from another extremely undesirable time slot (this time against The Cosby Show), a reduced budget, and lowered filming standard (they went from 35 mm in season 1 to 16mm film in season 2). The cutbacks contributed to the show not being renewed for a third season.

== Home media ==
Anchor Bay Entertainment released the entire series on DVD in Region 1. The first season of Sledge Hammer! was released on DVD on July 27, 2004. The laugh track, which the network had insisted on including on the pilot and first 12 episodes, is removed on the DVD version. For this Spencer in part sourced copies of the episodes from collectors in the UK who had recorded the episodes where they aired without the laugh track and hired an experienced sound designer. These collectors are thanked on these DVDs. The DVD features a documentary on the series featuring interviews by Spencer, David Rasche, Anne-Marie Martin and Harrison Page. The DVD also includes an unaired version of the pilot that runs several minutes longer and has a different ending and theme music. An earthquake hit while Spencer was recording commentary for one of the DVDs; the tape kept rolling during the event and was included on the DVD, leaving viewers wondering whether the earthquake was real. The first season enjoyed strong sales. The second season was released on DVD on April 12, 2005; the commentary on the final episode ended with Spencer, again, being caught in another earthquake, this time with sound effects and a convenient cliffhanger.

On September 6, 2011, it was announced that Image Entertainment had acquired the rights to the series. It was subsequently announced that they would release Sledge Hammer!- The Complete Series on DVD in Region 1 on December 13, 2011. The set will not feature the documentary, commentaries, the uncut pilot (the broadcast version is used) and other bonus features from the Anchor Bay release.

In Region 4, Shock Entertainment has released both seasons on DVD in Australia.

DVD name	Ep #	Release date	
DVD name	Ep #	Region 1	Region 4
Season 1	22	July 27, 2004	June 29, 2011
Season 2	19	April 12, 2005	August 31, 2011
The Complete Series	41	December 13, 2011	N/A

== Awards ==
Sledge Hammer! was nominated for a 1987 People's Choice Award in the category of "Favorite New TV Comedy."

== Comics ==
New World's then-subsidiary Marvel Comics released a short-lived comic book based upon the series as a promotion for the second season. In the second issue, Sledge is up against a Spider-Man impostor and on the cover issue a disclaimer hints that Sledge Hammer is actually a mutant when the X-Men series and its mutant spin-offs were at the height of their popularity.

The series only lasted two issues but was only intended for publicity purposes.

== See also ==
- Police Squad!, a similar American TV series from the 1980s that spawned the Naked Gun film series.
- Angie Tribeca, a similar American TV series that satirizes American procedurals
- A Touch of Cloth, a similar British comedy (2012–2014)
