= William E. McEuen =

American film producer (1941–2020)

William E. "Bill" McEuen
- Born: 1941; Oakland, California
- Died: September 24, 2020 (aged 78–79); Kona, Hawaii
- Occupations: Music Producer, Film Producer
- Spouse: Alice McEuen
- Relatives: John McEuen (brother)

William Eugene McEuen (1941 – September 24, 2020) was a film producer and record producer famous for working with Steve Martin and the Nitty Gritty Dirt Band. His younger brother is John McEuen, banjo player and founding member of the Nitty Gritty Dirt Band.

== Career ==
McEuen is credited with earning the Nitty Gritty Dirt Band their first recording contract with Liberty Records. He also co-wrote eight songs with the band.

McEuen has five production credits, including Steve Martin's A Wild and Crazy Guy, Steven Wright's I Have a Pony and three albums by the Nitty Gritty Dirt Band.

Writing in 1974 in reference to Stars & Stripes Forever, Cashbox stated: "'William E. McEuen Presents' once again becomes an honored phrase as the Nitty Gritty Dirt Band bows their latest album..."

Through Aspen Film Society, the production company he co-founded in 1976 with Steve Martin, McEuen also acted as producer or executive producer for multiple movies, most notably as producer with 1979's The Jerk, 1983's The Man with Two Brains, and executive producer for 1985's Pee-wee's Big Adventure and The Big Picture. In 1978 McEuen was nominated at the Academy Awards for Best Short Film with The Absent-Minded Waiter.

McEuen was twice been nominated for a Grammy, in 1970 for Best Album Cover (for Uncle Charlie & His Dog Teddy) and in 1975 for Best Album Package (for Symphonion Dream).

McEuen died on September 24, 2020, in Kona, Hawaii.
