= Mark Blankfield =

American actor (1950–2024)

- Born: Mark W. Blankfield; May 8, 1950; Pasadena, Texas, U.S.
- Died: March 20, 2024 (aged 73); United States
- Occupations: Actor, comedian
- Years active: 1979–2017
- Spouse: Brandis Kemp (m. 1972; div. 1987)

Mark W. Blankfield (May 8, 1950 – March 20, 2024) was an American actor and comedian. He is best known as a regular cast member of the television variety series Fridays. Other work included roles in Jekyll and Hyde...Together Again, The Incredible Shrinking Woman, Robin Hood: Men in Tights, Dracula: Dead and Loving It, and The Jerk, Too, a reworked TV-movie version of The Jerk.

He made appearances in television series such as Taxi, Night Court, The Nutt House, The Jamie Foxx Show, Saved by the Bell, Sledge Hammer!, Crusade, Double Rush, Hangin' with Mr. Cooper, The John Larroquette Show, and Arrested Development.

Blankfield died on March 20, 2024, at the age of 73.

== Recurring characters on Fridays ==
- Pastor Babbitt, a highly conservative, yet very hypocritical televangelist whose sermons would always lead to admissions of being abused in his youth or indulging in the very sins and vices he's preaching against, such as homosexuality, prostitution, and premarital sex.
- Ken the Monster, a hunchback and working actor with an exaggerated walk that could be described as a spoof of Grandpa Amos McCoy of The Real McCoys. He was also cross-eyed, which impaired his depth perception. Ken found himself in various scenarios, including a parody of "The Postman Always Rings Twice", called "The Monster Always Rings Twice" where he seduces a lonely diner waitress, and a parody of Mommy Dearest (framed as Ken pitching a movie to a sleazy Hollywood producer [played by cast member Michael Richards]), where his movie star father (played by guest host Marty Feldman) tries to keep the press and his circle of friends from discovering that he has a son and abuses him, though most of what Ken goes through were fairly normal (going to his high school reunion, waking up from a one-night stand with a woman dressed as Tinker Bell from Peter Pan, and auditioning for acting roles).
- The Pharmacist, a jittery, drug-addled owner of "Drugs R Us" who tried to keep sane while working at his drug store (and getting high on the drugs and other assorted products, like glue, unmarked pills, and the testing liquid to a pregnancy kit, in his store). His catchphrases were, "I can handle it. I can handle it!" and "Take a pill!"
- One of The Transphibians, a trio of men (the other two members are played by Darrow Igus and Michael Richards) who, like actual transsexuals, feel that they were born in the wrong body, got surgery to look how they perceive themselves to be, and are discriminated for it by other people. Unlike actual transsexuals, the Transphibians are men who identify as amphibians and got surgery to look like them.
