= The Jerk =

1979 film by Carl Reiner

- Theatrical release poster
- Directed by: Carl Reiner
- Screenplay by: Steve Martin; Carl Gottlieb; Michael Elias
- Story by: Steve Martin; Carl Gottlieb
- Produced by: David V. Picker; William E. McEuen
- Starring: Steve Martin; Bernadette Peters; Catlin Adams; Jackie Mason
- Cinematography: Victor J. Kemper
- Edited by: Bud Molin; Ron Spang
- Music by: Jack Elliott
- Production company: Aspen Film Society
- Distributed by: Universal Pictures
- Release date: December 14, 1979
- Running time: 95 minutes
- Country: United States
- Language: English
- Budget: $4 million
- Box office: $100 million

The Jerk is a 1979 American comedy film directed by Carl Reiner and written by Steve Martin, Carl Gottlieb, and Michael Elias (from a story by Martin and Gottlieb). This was Martin's first starring role in a feature film. The film also features Bernadette Peters, M. Emmet Walsh, Catlin Adams, Maurice Evans, and Jackie Mason. Critical reviews were mostly positive, and The Jerk was a major financial success.

== Plot ==
Navin Johnson, a homeless person sleeping in a stairwell in Los Angeles, addresses the camera directly to tell his life story.

The white adopted son of black sharecroppers in Mississippi, Navin grows to adulthood naïvely unaware of these circumstances. On his birthday his mother prepares him his favorite meal of tuna salad with mayonnaise on white bread, a Tab, and twinkies with candles. She prepares a traditional southern meal for the rest of the family. She then reveals he is adopted. He is unable to dance in rhythm to the spirited folk songs played by the family but finds that he can do so perfectly to a champagne-style song on the radio. Seeing this moment as a calling, he excitedly decides to leave home and travel to St. Louis, where the broadcast originated. Along the way, he adopts a dog and names it "Shithead" after angering the guests at a motel by waking them up in the middle of the night, having misinterpreted the dog's barking at his door as a warning of a fire.

Navin finds a job as a gas station attendant, where he attempts to detain some thieves but accidentally destroys a nearby church. Later, a madman chooses his name at random from the telephone book and decides to kill him. As the gunman waits for an opportunity, Navin solders a brace to a customer's eyeglasses to stop them from slipping down his nose. The customer, Stan Fox, is an inventor who promises to try to market the device and split any profits with Navin. The gunman opens fire at Navin but misses, and Navin flees to the grounds of a traveling carnival.

Navin is hired as a weight guesser and is brusquely seduced by Patty Bernstein, an intimidating daredevil motorcyclist. Later, while operating a miniature railway, he meets a cosmetologist named Marie Kimble and arranges a date with her. When a jealous Patty interrupts and starts to beat Navin, Marie easily knocks her unconscious. The two begin a relationship, and Navin decides to ask Marie to marry him. Before he can do so, though, she leaves him because he cannot provide financial security. Devastated, Navin takes Shithead and travels to Los Angeles. There, the gunman who tried to kill him—now sane and working as a private investigator—tracks him down and gives him a letter from Stan requesting a meeting.

Stan has been able to market Navin's device, now branded as the Opti-Grab, and gives him a check for $250,000 as the first installment on his share of the profits. Navin finds and marries Marie, and the two adopt a life of extravagant spending as his wealth continues to grow. However, Navin is soon named as defendant in a class action lawsuit brought by director Carl Reiner and millions of other Opti-Grab customers who have become permanently cross-eyed after using the device. Navin loses the suit and is ordered to pay $10 million in damages, leaving him broke, and he storms out into the street after an argument with Marie.

Having finished his story, Navin resigns himself to living in poverty, only to be found by his adoptive family, who have brought Marie and Shithead with them. The family has become wealthy by investing the money Navin sent them from time to time, and they take him and Marie home to live in their new house, which is nearly identical to their old shack but larger to scale and sturdier. Once again, Navin dances on the porch to folk songs, this time with perfect rhythm.

== Cast ==
- Steve Martin as Navin R. Johnson
  - Martin also plays Cat Juggler, under the alias Pig Eye Jackson
- Bernadette Peters as Marie Kimble Johnson
- Catlin Adams as Patty Bernstein
- Mabel King as Mother
- Richard Ward as Father
- Dick Anthony Williams as Taj
- Bill Macy as Stan Fox
- M. Emmet Walsh as Madman
- Dick O'Neill as Frosty
- Maurice Evans as Hobart
- Helena Carroll as Hester
- Ren Woods as Elvira Johnson
- Pepe Serna as Punk #1
- Sonny Terry and Brownie McGee as Blues Singers
- Jackie Mason as Harry Hartounian
- David Landsberg as Bank Manager
- Domingo Ambriz as Father De Cordoba
- Richard Foronjy and Lenny Montana as Con Men
- Carl Gottlieb as Iron Balls McGinty
- Clete Roberts as Announcer
- Frances E. Williams as Grandma Johnson

Director Carl Reiner, credited as "Carl Reiner, the Celebrity", plays himself. Former Playboy Playmate Sharon Johansen plays Mrs. Hartounian, while Alfred Dennis has a small role as Irving. In addition there are uncredited appearances by Reiner's son Rob Reiner as the truck driver who picks up Navin and character actor Larry Hankin briefly appears as a circus hand.

== Production ==
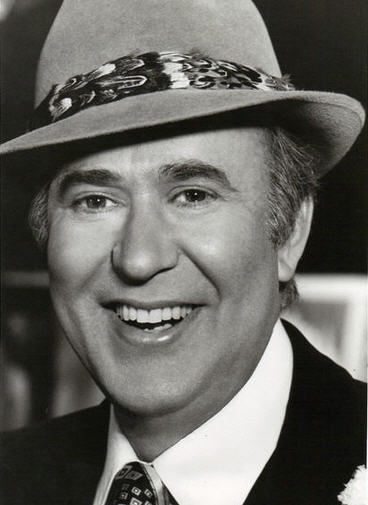
Director Carl Reiner (1976 photograph)

By 1977, comedian Steve Martin was experiencing wild success. He wanted to cross over to a film career, believing it promised more longevity. Basing his film proposal on a line from his act — "It wasn't always easy for me; I was born a poor black child" — he fleshed out his ideas into a series of notes he intended to deliver to studios. With confidence in his budding standup career, he imagined it would not be difficult to break into Hollywood. Instead, he found it more difficult than expected. Bill McEuen was acquainted with Paramount Pictures president David Picker, and convinced Picker to sign Martin for a three-year contract at the studio after showing him one of his routines at the Boarding House comedy club in San Francisco.

Martin passed along his notes, which the studio read carefully. It described a series of odd jobs lead character "Steve" would hold in his saga. Martin developed this concept into the first draft of The Jerk, but Paramount passed on the project after Picker left the studio. However, Picker convinced his new employer Universal Studios to sign a distribution deal for the film, which would leave Martin in creative control of the project. Martin was able to pick which director he wanted to work with. Martin initially chose Mike Nichols, but Nichols then "bowed out" of the project in 1978. Martin's next choice was Carl Reiner, famous for his work on The Dick Van Dyke Show.

The duo met constantly, and the film's title grew out of their conversations. Martin recounts in his memoir:

It needs to be something short, yet have the feeling of an epic tale. Like Dostoyevsky's The Idiot, but not that. Like The Jerk.

Martin wrote the part of "Marie" with Bernadette Peters in mind. He adapted several bits of his standup act to fit within the film, such as a monologue in which he emotionally exits a scene, remarking "I don't need anything", but nevertheless picking up each object he passes on his way out. In co-writing the script with Carl Gottlieb and Michael Elias, their goal was to provide a laugh on each page of the screenplay.

Principal photography took 45 days using 85 locations in Greater Los Angeles, on a $4.6 million budget. This included Mohammed al Fassi's mansion in Beverly Hills, Pasadena, Westlake Village and Devonshire Downs in Northridge. In shooting the film, Reiner "ran a joyful set", according to Martin, with the cast and crew eating lunch together each day. Martin's favorite moment of the film, as he detailed in his 2007 memoir Born Standing Up, was the scene in which he and Peters sing "Tonight You Belong to Me". Martin felt the moment was touching, and waited in anticipation at the film's premiere screening in St. Louis. Unfortunately, much of the audience left during the scene to buy more popcorn.

=== Deleted scenes ===
A scene in which Bill Murray was to have made a cameo was cut from the final film. An alternate, comic introduction of Marie (Peters), near the train ride Navin was running at the carnival, was shot. When her nephew takes off on the train, Navin rescues him, and in returning the boy to Marie, has the bill of his engineer's cap pulled down over his eyes so he cannot see the toy village he (Navin) destroys like a lunatic.

Another scene that was cut featured Gailard Sartain as a Texas oil millionaire who tearfully begs Navin for money to replace the cracked, dried-out leather seats on his private jet. Navin grants his request and he gratefully states: "Now I can fly my friends to the Super Bowl like a MAN, and not some damned BUM!"

The television version features a scene in which a forlorn Navin, trying to forget Marie, spends six hours on the Round Up carnival ride. The boss orders the ride stopped, and Navin is removed by two carnival workers, who sit him down on the ride's stairs. "What are you looking at?", he asks them. "Haven't you seen a man so broken he needed to spin?"

== Reception ==
=== Box office ===
The film was a hit, earning over $73 million domestically, and making the movie the eighth highest-grossing of 1979 and $100 million worldwide, having been produced on a relatively low budget of $4 million.

=== Critical response ===
On review aggregator Rotten Tomatoes, the film has an approval rating of 82% based on 44 reviews, with an average rating of 6.9/10. The site's critical consensus reads: "Crude, crass, and oh so quotable, The Jerk is nothing short of an all-out comedic showcase for Steve Martin." On Metacritic, the film received a score of 61 based on 14 reviews, indicating "generally favorable reviews".

Janet Maslin of The New York Times wrote that The Jerk "is by turns funny, vulgar and backhandedly clever, never more so than when it aspires to absolute stupidity. And Mr. Martin, who began his career with an arrow stuck through his head, has since developed a real genius for playing dumb ... Even when it's crude—which is quite a lot of the time—it's not mean-spirited ... Mr. Martin and his co-star, Bernadette Peters, work very sweetly together, even when they sing a duet of 'Tonight You Belong to Me,' carrying sweetness to what could easily have become an intolerable extreme."

Roger Ebert of The Chicago Sun-Times gave the film a mixed review, stating The Jerk was "all gags and very little comedy" and built of "gag situations [which] are milked for one-time laughs. They don't grow out of his character, or contribute to it." In a retrospective review published in 2000, the BBC rated the movie two out of five stars and described the film as an "early watered-down version of the crude comedy the Farrelly Brothers would later take to new extremes" and made references to it having similar themes to the early 1980s parody film Airplane! VideoHound's Golden Movie Retriever reviewed the film for its book and rated the movie as being two and a half stars. The author of the review referred to Steve Martin's silly, exaggerated acting as complementary to the early comedian Jerry Lewis.

== Legacy ==
The Jerk has been praised as not only one of Martin's best comedic efforts, but also one of the funniest films ever made. In 2000, readers of Total Film voted The Jerk the 48th greatest comedy film of all time. This film is No. 20 on Bravo's 100 Funniest Movies and No. 89 on the American Film Institute list AFI's 100 Years...100 Laughs. IGN ranked the film as the tenth top comedy film of all time. Premiere voted Steve Martin's performance of Navin Johnson No. 99 on their list, "The 100 Greatest Performances of All Time". A BBC poll of more than 250 critics rated the film as the 99th greatest comedy of all time.

Christiane Kubrick hailed it as one of Stanley Kubrick's favorite films of all time. It led to Kubrick meeting with Martin to discuss working together on his film Eyes Wide Shut.

== Sequel ==
The Jerk had a television film sequel, The Jerk, Too (1984), starring Mark Blankfield as Navin and co-starring Stacey Nelkin. Steve Martin was executive producer, but did not write the screenplay.
