= Stacey Nelkin =

American actress

- Occupation: Actress
- Years active: 1978–present
- Known for: Generations; Halloween III: Season of the Witch
- Spouses: Barry Bostwick (m. 1987; div. 1991) Marco Greenberg (m. 1998)
- Children: 3

Stacey Nelkin is an American film and television actress.

== Early life ==
Nelkin was raised in New York City in a Jewish family. She attended Stuyvesant High School.

== Career ==
=== Acting ===
Nelkin starred as Bonnie Sue Chisholm in four episodes of the CBS western miniseries The Chisholms (1979). When the miniseries resumed in 1980, she was up for the role in the miniseries but turned it down to take a role as Candy on Up the Academy. Delta Burke starred in the role of Bonnie Sue instead of Stacey.

She appeared in the horror film Halloween III: Season of the Witch (1982) as Ellie Grimbridge. Around the same time, Nelkin was scheduled to appear in the film Blade Runner. She had been cast as Mary, a sixth Nexus-6 replicant that escapes from "off-world" and comes to Earth, but budget constraints resulted in her part being cut from the film early in the period of principal photography. Before being cast as Mary, she had done a screen test for the role of Pris but the role ultimately went to Daryl Hannah. Nelkin's screen test appears on Disc 4 of the collector's edition DVD set. Nelkin has made guest appearances in several TV series, including The Paper Chase, The Waltons, CHiPs, The A-Team, Eight Is Enough, 1st & Ten and Hunter.

Her best-known TV role was on the soap opera Generations (1990) as Christy Russell.

She starred in the 2022 horror film, The Shed after responding to a posting about a movie that was going to be shot locally, and calling the number on the poster.

=== Relationship expert ===
Nelkin is a self-styled "relationship expert" and has her own YouTube channel and a website. She wrote a book called You Can't Afford to Break Up: How an Empty Wallet and a Dirty Mind Can Save Your Relationship. For a time, she was a frequent guest on the program Fox & Friends.

=== Substance abuse professional ===
In 2008, Nelkin began a career in drama therapy and today is a substance abuse professional and Certified Alcohol and Substance Abuse Counselor (CASAC).

In February 2016, Nelkin began treating dually diagnosed individuals with mental health and substance abuse issues through the Office of Alcoholism and Substance Abuse Services Program (OASAS), since serving as an intake and CASAC counselor at The Bridge, a New York-based $65 million agency that provides housing and behavioral health services to 4,000 New Yorkers annually.

== Personal life ==
Woody Allen's film Manhattan (1979) was inspired by his relationship with Nelkin, whom Allen met when she was 16 on the set of his earlier film Annie Hall (from which her bit part was later cut). Their relationship began when Allen was 42 and Nelkin was 17, the age of consent in New York. The pair remained longtime friends; Allen later cast Nelkin as Rita in Bullets Over Broadway (1994).

Nelkin married Marco Greenberg in 1998; the couple have three children. She was married to actor Barry Bostwick from 1987 to 1991. She has been married three times.

== Filmography ==
=== Film ===
Year	Title	Role	Notes
1979	California Dreaming	Marsha	
1980	Serial	Marlene	
1980	Up the Academy	Candy	
1981	Going Ape!	Cynthia	
1982	Halloween III: Season of the Witch	Ellie Grimbridge	
1983	Yellowbeard	Triola	
1983	Get Crazy	Susie Allen	
1993	Desperate Motive	Bank Teller	
1994	Bullets Over Broadway	Rita	
1996	Everything Relative	Katie Kessler	
2008	Breaking Pattern	Joanie	Short
2010	12 Floors Up	Margot Reese	Short
2015	Dante and Beatrice: A Family Film	Theresa Portinari	Short
2022	The Shed	Barbara	Short
2023	The Forest Hills	Debbie	

=== Television ===
Year	Title	Role	Notes
1978	CHiPs	Marge	Episode: "Hitch-Hiking Hitch"
1978	Eight Is Enough	Linda	Episode: "The Lost Weekend"
1978	Fish	Adrian	Episode: "For the Love of Mike"
1978	The Paper Chase	Tracy Ford	Episode: "The Man Who Would Be King"
1978	The Waltons	Mary Frances Conover	Episode: "The Calling"
1978	Like Mom, Like Me	Tao Wolf	TV film
1979	The Triangle Factory Fire Scandal	Gina	TV film
1979	The Chisholms	Bonnie Sue Chisholm	TV miniseries
1979	The Last Convertible	Sheila Garrigan	TV miniseries
1980	Children of Divorce	Andrea Hoffman	TV film
1981	Trapper John, M.D.	Kim	Episode: "A Family Affair"
1982	The Adventures of Pollyanna	Cora Spencer	TV film
1984	The Jerk, Too	Marie Van Buren	TV film
1984	Simon & Simon	Linda Sanborn	Episode: "Deep Cover"
1985	Finder of Lost Loves	Donna Sinclair	Episode: "Aftershocks"
1985	The A-Team	Lisa Perry	Episode: "Waste 'Em!"
1985	The Fall Guy	Rhonda Payne	Episode: "Femme Fatale"
1985	Murder, She Wrote	Cheryl Lodge	Episode: "Reflections of the Mind"
1985	The Insiders		Episode: "After the Fox"
1986	Crazy Like a Fox	Dianne	Episode: "Just Another Fox in the Crowd"
1986	The Twilight Zone	Faith Carlson	Episode: "A Day in Beaumont"
1989	1st & Ten	Dr. Death's Girlfriend	Episode: "Mind Games"
1990	The Yum Yums: The Day Things Went Sour	(voice)	TV special
1990	Generations	Christy Russell #2	TV series (28 episodes)
1990	The Adventures of Don Coyote and Sancho Panda	Additional voices	Episode: "Pity the Poor Pirate"
1991	Hunter	Barbara	Episode: "Ex Marks the Spot"
1993	Basic Values: Sex, Shock & Censorship in the 90's	Patty Turner	TV film
1994	Ride with the Wind	Steph	TV film
2009	Fringe	Reporter	Episode: "Midnight"
