= Carl Gottlieb =

American actor (born 1938)

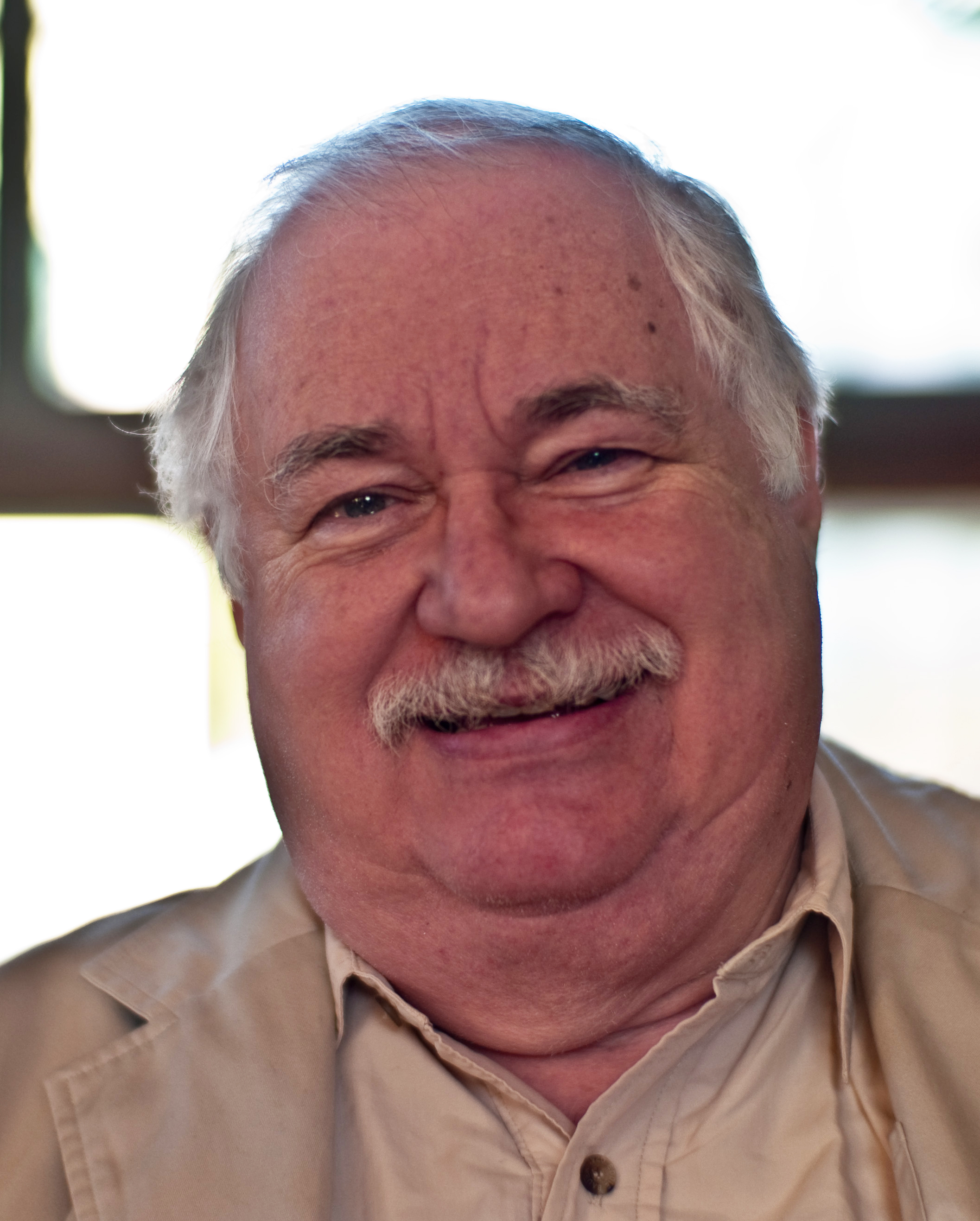
- Gottlieb in 2009
- Born: March 18, 1938 (age 88); New York City, U.S.
- Occupations: Actor; comedian; screenwriter; executive
- Writing career
- Period: 1966–present
- Genres: Comedy; thriller
- Notable work: Jaws

Carl Gottlieb (born March 18, 1938) is an American screenwriter, actor, comedian, and executive. He is best known for co-writing the screenplay for Jaws (1975) and its first two sequels, as well as directing the 1981 film Caveman.

== Early life ==
Carl Gottlieb was born in 1938 in New York City to a middle-class Jewish family, the son of Sergius M. Gottlieb, an engineer, and Elizabeth, a medical administrative assistant.

Gottlieb studied drama at Syracuse University where he befriended character actor Larry Hankin. After graduating, he was drafted into the U.S. Army, serving as an entertainment specialist in the Special Services division from 1961 to 1963. Following his discharge, he became a member, later in the 1960s, of the San Francisco improvisational comedy troupe The Committee. They made one feature film: A Session with the Committee.

== Career ==
He began writing comedy for TV, contributing to The Smothers Brothers Comedy Hour for which he won an Emmy Award in 1969, The Music Scene, The Bob Newhart Show, All in the Family, and The Odd Couple. He also appeared on camera on Ken Berry's Wow Show variety summer television program in 1972. Minor acting roles have included Robert Altman's M*A*S*H and the film Clueless.

Gottlieb also cowrote David Crosby's two autobiographies, 1989's Long Time Gone and 2006's Since Then.

=== Jaws ===
Gottlieb was hired as an actor to appear as Harry Meadows, the editor of the local newspaper, in Jaws. He was hired by his friend, Steven Spielberg, to redraft the script, adding more dimensions to the characters, particularly humor. His redrafts reduced the role of Meadows (who still appears in the Town Hall corridor and the Tiger Shark scene).

Gottlieb wrote a book, The Jaws Log, about the notoriously difficult production of the film.

Gottlieb was enlisted under similar circumstances to work on the Jaws 2 screenplay. He co-wrote the screenplays for The Jerk, in which he played Iron Balls McGinty, and Jaws 3-D. Gottlieb contributes to Jaws related activities, such as interviews (including the documentary The Shark Is Still Working) and attended JawsFest on Martha's Vineyard in June 2005.

== Writers' politics ==
Gottlieb joined the Writers Guild of America in 1968 and became interested in Guild politics and with a desire to serve fellow writers following writers' strikes in the 1970s and 1981. He was elected to the Board of Directors in 1983, and re-elected for numerous terms thereafter, including two stints as vice-president (1991–1994). He was again appointed VP of the Writers Guild of America, West in 2004 and served until the following year. In September 2011, he was elected as WGA-West secretary-treasurer.

== Filmography ==
=== Feature films ===
==== As writer only ====
| Year | Title | Director | Notes |
|---|---|---|---|
| 1975 | Jaws | Steven Spielberg | Credited with Peter Benchley; Nominated - BAFTA Award for Best Screenplay; Nominated - Golden Globe Award for Best Screenplay; Nominated - Writers Guild of America Award for Best Adapted Screenplay |
| 1977 | Which Way Is Up? | Michael Schultz | Credited with Cecil Brown |
| 1978 | Jaws 2 | Jeannot Szwarc | Credited with Howard Sackler |
| 1979 | The Jerk | Carl Reiner | Credited with Steve Martin & Michael Elias |
| 1983 | Jaws 3-D | Joe Alves | Credited with Richard Matheson |
| 1983 | Doctor Detroit | Michael Pressman | Credited with Bruce Jay Friedman & Robert Boris |

==== As director ====
| Year | Title | Notes |
|---|---|---|
| 1977 | The Absent-Minded Waiter | Short Film |
| 1981 | Caveman | Also Writer |
| 1987 | Amazon Women on the Moon | Co-Directed with Joe Dante, Peter Horton, John Landis & Robert K. Weiss; Directed Segments: Pethouse Video, Son of the Invisible Man, Art Sale & Peter Pan Theatre |

==== As actor ====
| Year | Title | Role | Notes |
|---|---|---|---|
| 1968 | Maryjane | Larry Kane | |
| 1970 | MASH | 'Ugly John' | |
| 1972 | Up the Sandbox | Vinnie | |
| 1972 | Something Evil | Party Guest | TV Movie |
| 1973 | The Long Goodbye | Wade Party Guest | Uncredited |
| 1975 | Jaws | Harry Meadows | |
| 1976 | Cannonball | Terry McMillan | |
| 1979 | The Jerk | Iron Balls McGinty | |
| 1983 | The Sting II | Maitre D' | |
| 1984 | Johnny Dangerously | Dr. Magnus | |
| 1985 | Into the Night | Federal Agent | |
| 1995 | Clueless | Priest | |
| 2017 | Decker | Himself | TV Series: 1 Episode |
