= Alan Spencer (writer) =

American director and writer

- Occupations: Screenwriter; film director
- Known for: Sledge Hammer!

Alan Spencer is an American screenwriter and director, best known for his work in comedy and creating the ABC series Sledge Hammer!

== Biography ==
Spencer was born in Whittier, California. He began his career in television writing at the age of 15. His initial work involved writing jokes for comedians. His early success in television was marked by overcoming skepticism due to his young age and was notable for his unconventional approach, including befriending industry figures such as Andy Kaufman and Marty Feldman by sneaking onto movie sets. At 26, he created Sledge Hammer! for ABC, becoming one of the youngest creators of a network series at that time. The show gained a cult following and influenced later comedies, particularly in its offbeat style.

Following the cancellation of Sledge Hammer!, Spencer worked on various projects, some of which remained unproduced. He developed a sitcom featuring Anthony Perkins and in 1990 created The Ghost Writer for ABC, which was later considered by Fox but not produced due to its dark tone and Spencer's concurrent commitment to The Nutt House with NBC and Mel Brooks. In 1993, he wrote and directed Hexed. Galaxy Beat (1994), a science fiction comedy, and The Tomorrow Man (1995), a science fiction film intended as a series pilot, were among his other projects.

In 2007, Spencer returned to television with Crime Team!, a parody of police procedurals co-created with Jim Abrahams for ABC. He was also involved in the development of The Naked Gun: What 4? The Rhythm of Evil (2009), a proposed sequel to the original film series. Despite a positive reception of the script and a planned role for Leslie Nielsen, budgetary constraints and creative differences led to Spencer's departure from the project, which was subsequently canceled.

In 2010, Spencer developed Man Up! for SPIKE, in collaboration with Adam Sandler's Happy Madison. The comedy, about a paramilitary group performing exercises in civilian areas, was not produced due to SPIKE's discontinuation of scripted programming. In 2012, he created IFC's Bullet in the Face, another action satire series.
