= More Great Dirt =

Compilation album by Nitty Gritty Dirt Band
- Released: January 10, 1989
- Genre: Country, country rock, folk rock, bluegrass
- Length: 33:31
- Label: Warner Bros. Nashville
- Producer: Marshall Morgan, Paul Worley, Josh Leo

Nitty Gritty Dirt Band chronology
Workin' Band (1988)	More Great Dirt (1989)	Will the Circle Be Unbroken: Volume Two (1989)

Professional ratings
Review scores
Source	Rating
AllMusic	4/5 stars

More Great Dirt is the 1989 album from the Nitty Gritty Dirt Band. It is subtitled The Best of The Nitty Gritty Dirt Band, Vol. II, making it a sequel to Twenty Years of Dirt. The songs on this compilation are from albums released from 1984 through 1988. This album reached No. 38 on the US country chart and was certified gold.

== Track listing ==
No.	Title	Writer(s)	Original album	Length
1.	"Cadillac Ranch"	Bruce Springsteen	Plain Dirt Fashion (1984)	3:41
2.	"I've Been Lookin'"	Jimmy Ibbotson, Jeff Hanna	Workin' Band (1988)	3:10
3.	"Oh What a Love"	Ibbotson	Hold On (1987)	3:08
4.	"Workin' Man (Nowhere to Go)"	Jimmie Fadden	Workin' Band	3:47
5.	"I Love Only You"	Dave Loggins, Don Schlitz	Plain Dirt Fashion	3:30
6.	"Fishin' in the Dark"	Wendy Waldman, Jim Photoglo	Hold On	3:22
7.	"Baby's Got a Hold on Me"	Josh Leo, Hanna, Bob Carpenter	Hold On	3:04
8.	"Face on the Cutting Room Floor"	Steve Goodman, Hanna, Ibbotson	Plain Dirt Fashion	3:11
9.	"Down That Road Tonight"	Hanna, Leo, Waldman	Workin' Band	3:07
10.	"Home Again in My Heart"	Leo, Waldman	Partners, Brothers and Friends (1985)	3:31
Total length:				33:31

== Personnel ==
- Jeff Hanna
- Jimmie Fadden
- Jim Ibbotson
- Bob Carpenter

== Production ==
Producers

- Marshall Morgan and Paul Worley: Tracks 1, 3, 5, 8 & 10
- Josh Leo: Tracks 2, 4, 6, 7 & 9

== Chart performance ==
Chart (1989)	Peak position
U.S. Billboard Top Country Albums	38
