= Twenty Years of Dirt =

Compilation album by Nitty Gritty Dirt Band
- Released: 1986
- Genre: Country, country rock, folk rock, bluegrass
- Label: Warner Bros. Nashville
- Producer: William E. McEuen, Jeff Hanna, Bob Edwards, Norbert Putnam, Marshall Morgan

Nitty Gritty Dirt Band chronology
Partners, Brothers and Friends (1985)	Twenty Years of Dirt (1986)	Hold On (1987)

Professional ratings
Review scores
Source	Rating
Allmusic	4/5 stars

Twenty Years of Dirt, subtitled The Best of the Nitty Gritty Dirt Band, is the second compilation album from the Nitty Gritty Dirt Band. It is a collection of hits from their career to that point. The album contained one new song, "Stand a Little Rain", which reached #5 on the Billboard Hot Country Singles & Tracks chart. The album reached 10 on the US Country charts and was certified platinum.

== Track listing ==
1. "Intro/Mr. Bojangles" * (Jerry Jeff Walker) – 5:03
  from Uncle Charlie & His Dog Teddy 1970
2. "Ripplin' Waters" * (Jimmy Ibbotson) – 5:46
  from Symphonion Dream 1975
3. "American Dream" ** (Rodney Crowell) – 3:48
  from An American Dream 1979
4. "Make A Little Magic" ** (Jeff Hanna, Richard Hathaway, Bob Carpenter) – 3:46
  from Make a Little Magic 1980
5. "Fire in the Sky" ** (Hanna, Carpenter) – 4:40
  from Jealousy 1981
6. "Dance Little Jean" *** (Jim Ibbotson) – 3:13
  from Let's Go 1983
7. "Long Hard Road (The Sharecropper's Dream) **** (Crowell) – 3:18
  from Plain Dirt Fashion 1984
8. "High Horse" **** (Ibbotson) – 3:13
  from Plain Dirt Fashion 1984
9. "Modern Day Romance" **** (Kix Brooks, Dan Tyler) – 3:30
  from Partners, Brothers and Friends 1985
10. "Partners, Brothers and Friends" **** (Ibbotson, Hanna) – 3:59
  from Partners, Brothers and Friends 1985
11. "Stand a Little Rain" **** (Don Schlitz, Donny Lowery) – 4:22 (Previously unreleased)

== Chart positions ==
Year	Single	Chart positions				Album
Year	Single	US Country	US	CAN Country	CAN	Album
1970	"Mr. Bojangles"	—	9	—	2	Uncle Charlie & His Dog Teddy
1975	"Ripplin' Waters"	—	—	—	—	Symphonion Dream
1980	"An American Dream" (as The Dirt Band)	58	13	—	3	An American Dream
1980	"Make a Little Magic" (as The Dirt Band)^{A}	77	25	63	51	Make a Little Magic
1981/1986	"Fire in the Sky"	7	76	5	—	Jealousy
1983	"Dance Little Jean"	9	—	39	—	Let's Go
1984	"Long Hard Road (The Sharecropper's Dream)"	1	—	2	—	Plain Dirt Fashion
1985	"High Horse"	2	—	2	—	Plain Dirt Fashion
1986	"Modern Day Romance"	1	—	2	—	Partners, Brothers and Friends
1986	"Partners, Brothers and Friends"	6	—	3	—	Partners, Brothers and Friends
1986	"Stand a Little Rain"	5	—	3	—	Twenty Years of Dirt

== Personnel ==
- Bob Carpenter
- Jimmie Fadden
- Jeff Hanna
- Jim Ibbotson
- John McEuen

== Production ==
Producer

- * William E. McEuen
- ** Jeff Hanna/Bob Edwards
- *** Norbert Putnam
- **** Marshall Morgan

== Charts ==
=== Weekly charts ===
Chart (1986)	Peak position
US Top Country Albums (Billboard)	10

=== Year-end charts ===
Chart (1986)	Position
US Top Country Albums (Billboard)	50
