= Gerard McMahon discography =

The following albums, singles and EPs released by English singer-songwriter Gerard McMahon under the pseudonyms Gerard, Gerard McMahon, Gerard McMann and G TOM MAC.

Year	Artist	Title	Label	Type
1976	Gerard	Gerard	Caribou Records	Album
1976	Gerard	Hello, Operator	Caribou Records	Single
1976	Gerard	Row	Bite	Album
1981	Gerard McMahon and Kid Lightning	Blue Rue	ARC/Columbia	Album
1981	Gerard McMahon and Kid Lightning	Taxi (Nightdriver)	CBS	Single
1983	Gerard McMahon	No Looking Back	Full Moon/Warner Bros.	Album
1983	Gerard McMahon	Nickel Charm Jack	Full Moon/Warner Bros.	Single
1986	Gerard McMann	Foreign Papers	Atco Records	Album
1986	Gerard McMann	Everytime I See You	Atco Records	Single
1986	Gerard McMann	True To You	Atco Records	Single
1987	Gerard McMann	Cry Little Sister	Atlantic	Single
2000	G TOM MAC	G TOM MAC	Edge Artists	Album
2000	G TOM MAC	The Immortal (Original Soundtrack)	Edge Artists	Album
2003	G TOM MAC	Once Betrayed	Edge Artists	EP
2004	G TOM MAC	So Alive	Edge Artists	EP
2005	G TOM MAC	How to be Pop, Stupid, Cool	Edge Artists	EP
2006	G TOM MAC	Secrets of Oz	Edge Artists	EP
2007	G TOM MAC	All The Rage	Edge Artists	EP
2007	G TOM MAC	Sunset Junction (Original Soundtrack)	Edge Artists	Album
2007	G TOM MAC	Thou Shalt Not Fall	Edge Artists	Album
2017	G TOM MAC	Keep Your Eyes on the Prize		Single

== Other ==
- Witchblade The Music (Edge Artists 2004) Compilation by Various Artists, compiled and produced by G TOM MAC.
