= Will the Circle Be Unbroken: Volume Two =

Studio album by Nitty Gritty Dirt Band
- Released: May 1, 1989
- Recorded: December 1988 and January 1989
- Studio: Scruggs Sound (Berry Hill, Tennessee)
- Genre: Neotraditional country; country folk; bluegrass; gospel
- Length: 62:19
- Label: Universal
- Producer: Randy Scruggs; Nitty Gritty Dirt Band

Nitty Gritty Dirt Band chronology
Workin' Band (1988)	Will the Circle Be Unbroken: Volume Two (1989)	The Rest of the Dream (1991)

Will the Circle Be Unbroken: Volume Two (also Circle II) is the nineteenth studio album by American country folk group Nitty Gritty Dirt Band, released on May 1, 1989. The album follows the same concept as the band's 1972 album, Will the Circle Be Unbroken, which featured guest performances from many notable country music stars.

== Composition ==
Circle II features largely acoustic, bluegrass music instrumentation with a line-up of contemporary country music artists that includes Johnny Cash, Rosanne Cash, Emmylou Harris, Michael Martin Murphey and Ricky Skaggs. Returnees from the first Circle are bluegrass musician Jimmy Martin, banjoist Earl Scruggs, fiddler Vassar Clements and singer Roy Acuff.

Other artists represent the rock, folk and pop genres, including Levon Helm from the Band, John Denver, John Prine, John Hiatt and Bruce Hornsby.

Among the tracks is the Bob Dylan composition, "You Ain't Goin' Nowhere", sung as a duet by former members of the Byrds, Roger McGuinn and Chris Hillman, their first reunion in many years. The appearance of McGuinn and Hillman on an album dominated by Grand Ole Opry members represented a reconciliation of sorts between them, after the Byrds had received a cold reception at their lone appearance on the Opry in 1968; the song itself was one that Ralph Emery had famously dissed during the Byrds' brief Nashville residency in the same era.

The roster of session musicians for the album featured many notable performers, including fiddler Mark O'Connor, resonator guitarist Jerry Douglas, banjoist Béla Fleck, guitarist Chet Atkins and bassist Roy Huskey, Jr., son of bassist Junior Huskey, who had played on the first Circle.

Like the first Circle, the album features snippets of studio chatter. In the lead-in to John Denver's song, "And So It Goes", someone asks, "Is this practice?" Denver replies: "They're all practice."

In an intro to the song "Riding Alone", Emmylou Harris summed up her thoughts about relaxed atmosphere of the recording sessions, saying: "Years ago I had the experience of sitting around in a living room with a bunch of people and singing and playing, and it was like a spiritual experience, it was wonderful. And I decided then that was what I was going to do with my life was play music, do music. In the making of records, I think over the years we've all gotten a little too technical, a little too hung up on getting things perfect. We've lost the living room. The living room has gone out of the music, but today I feel like we got it back."

== Reception ==
Professional ratings
Review scores
Source	Rating
AllMusic	{unrated}
Hi-Fi News & Record Review	A:1
New Musical Express	8/10

Nick Robinson of British music newspaper Music Week reviewed the album positively. He wrote: "The result is an impressive and uplifting collection of 20 tracks that should even appeal to those punters that are not already familiar with the styles included."

Will the Circle Be Unbroken: Volume Two was certified gold in the United States and Canada. The album peaked at No. 5 on the Billboard Top Country Album chart and at 95 on the Billboard 200. Singles from the album included John Denver's "And So It Goes", "Turn of the Century", "When It's Gone" and "One Step Over the Line".

It won Grammy Awards in 1990 for Best Bluegrass Recording (for "The Valley Road", with Bruce Hornsby), Best Country Instrumental Performance (for "Amazing Grace" by Randy Scruggs), and Best Country Performance by a Duo or Group with Vocal. It also won Album of the Year at the Country Music Association Awards. A documentary film, The Making of Will the Circle Be Unbroken II, was released by Cabin Fever Entertainment.

Circle II was followed up with a 2002 album, Will the Circle Be Unbroken, Volume III, which coincided with the 30th anniversary re-release of Will the Circle Be Unbroken.

== Track listing ==
1. "Life's Railway to Heaven" (Traditional, arranged by Johnny Cash) – 4:39
  - Lead vocal and guitar by Johnny Cash with June Carter Cash, Anita Carter and Helen Carter (as the Carter Family)
  - Randy Scruggs plays "Mother" Maybelle Carter's Gibson L5
2. "Grandpa Was a Carpenter" (John Prine) – 3:24
  - Lead vocal and guitar by John Prine
3. "When I Get My Rewards" (Paul Kennerley) – 4:25
  - Lead vocal by Levon Helm
4. "Don't You Hear Jerusalem Moan" (Traditional) – 3:56
  - With New Grass Revival. Mandolin and first verse lead vocals by Sam Bush, second verse vocals by Bob Carpenter and John Cowan; third verse vocals by Jimmy Ibbotson and Pat Flynn
5. "Little Mountain Church House" (Jim Rushing, Carl Jackson) – 3:32
  - Lead vocal and guitar by Ricky Skaggs
6. "And So It Goes" (Paul Overstreet, Don Schlitz) – 3:54
  - Lead vocal by John Denver
  - Released on John Denver's Australian album Stonehaven Sunset
7. "When It's Gone" (Jimmie Fadden, Don Schlitz) – 2:34
  - Lead vocal by Jimmy Ibbotson
8. "Mary Danced With Soldiers" (Kennerley) – 3:07
  - Lead vocal and guitar by Emmylou Harris
9. "Riding Alone" (Bob Carpenter, Jeff Hanna, Richard Hathaway) – 3:09
  - Lead vocals by Bob Carpenter and Emmylou Harris
10. "I'm Sittin' on Top of the World" (Lonnie Chatmon, Walter Vinson) – 3:10
  - Lead vocal and guitar by Jimmy Martin
11. "Lovin' on the Side" (Paulette Carlson, Jimmy Ibbotson, Sandy Waltner) – 2:57
  - Lead vocal by Paulette Carlson
  - Mandolin by Levon Helm
12. "Lost River" (Michael Martin Murphey) – 3:26
  - Lead vocal and guitar by Michael Martin Murphey
13. "Bayou Jubilee" (Jeff Hanna) – 3:01
  - Lead vocal by Jeff Hanna
  - Fiddle by Sam Bush
  - Piano by Bruce Hornsby
14. "Blues Berry Hill" (Carpenter, Fadden, Hanna, Ibbotson, R. Scruggs) – 3:26
  - Instrumental, featuring Randy Scruggs on lead guitar
15. "Turn of the Century" (J. Fred Knobloch, Dan Tyler) – 3:39
  - Lead vocals by Jimmy Ibbotson (first verse), Jeff Hanna (second verse) and Bob Carpenter (third verse)
16. "One Step Over the Line" (John Hiatt) – 4:30
  - Lead vocal and guitar by John Hiatt with Rosanne Cash, vocals
17. "You Ain't Goin' Nowhere" (Bob Dylan) – 3:53
  - Lead vocals and twelve-string guitar by Roger McGuinn with Chris Hillman, lead vocals and guitar
18. "The Valley Road" (Bruce Hornsby) – 4:13
  - Lead vocals and piano by Bruce Hornsby
19. "Will the Circle Be Unbroken" (A. P. Carter/last verse lyrics by Jimmy Ibbotson) – 5:39
  - Lead vocals by Johnny Cash (first verse), Roy Acuff (second verse), Ricky Skaggs (third verse), Levon Helm with Emmylou Harris (fourth verse) and Jimmy Ibbotson (fifth verse)
  - Backing choir: Roy Acuff, Cynthia Biederman, Sam Bush, Paulette Carlson, Bob Carpenter, Gretchen Carpenter, June Carter Cash, Johnny Cash, Cindy Cash, Rosanne Cash, John Cowan, Steve Dahl, John Denver, Jimmie Fadden, Béla Fleck, Pat Flynn, Radney Foster, Vince Gill, Jeff Hanna, Melody Hanna, John Hiatt, Chris Hillman, Bruce Hornsby, Jimmy Ibbotson, Helen Carter Jones, David Jones, Bashful Brother Oswald, Bill Lloyd, Jimmy Martin, Michael Martin Murphey, Roger McGuinn, Tracy Nelson, Robert Oermann, Brad Parker, Don Schlitz, Earl Scruggs, Gary Scruggs, Randy Scruggs, Steve Scruggs, Lynn Shults, Marty Stuart, Wendy Waldman, Steve Wariner, Cheryl White, Sharon White, Bobbie White
20. "Amazing Grace" (John Newton) – 1:48
  - Solo guitar, performed by Randy Scruggs

== Personnel ==
Nitty Gritty Dirt Band

- Bob Carpenter – piano, accordion, harmony vocals
- Jimmie Fadden – drums, harmonica
- Jeff Hanna – guitar, washboard, harmony vocals
- Jimmy Ibbotson – mandolin, harmony vocals

Session musicians

- Jerry Douglas – resonator guitar
- Roy Huskey, Jr. – upright bass
- Mark O'Connor – fiddle, mandolin
- Randy Scruggs – producer, guitar
- Chet Atkins – guitar on "Riding Alone"
- Vassar Clements – fiddle on "Sittin' on Top of the World"
- Béla Fleck – banjo on "Don't You Hear Jerusalem Moan", "Little Mountain Church House" and "I'm Sittin' on Top of the World"
- Bernie Leadon – banjo on "The Valley Road" and "Blues Berry Hill"
- John McEuen – banjo on "Lost River"
- Earl Scruggs – banjo on "Life's Railway to Heaven"
- Buck White – piano on "Little Mountain Church House"

== Charts ==
=== Weekly charts ===
Chart (1989)	Peak position
Canadian Albums (RPM)	57
Canadian Country Albums (RPM)	3
US Billboard 200	95
US Top Country Albums (Billboard)	5

=== Year-end charts ===
Chart (1989)	Position
US Top Country Albums (Billboard)	38
Chart (1990)	Position
US Top Country Albums (Billboard)	62
