= Hold On (Nitty Gritty Dirt Band album) =

Studio album by Nitty Gritty Dirt Band
- Released: July 7, 1987
- Genre: Country
- Length: 36:18
- Label: Warner Bros. Nashville
- Producer: Josh Leo, Marshall Morgan, Paul Worley

Nitty Gritty Dirt Band chronology
| Twenty Years of Dirt (1986) | Hold On (1987) | Workin' Band (1988) |

Singles from Hold On
- 1. "Baby's Got a Hold on Me" Released: March 28, 1987; 2. "Fishin' in the Dark" Released: June 7, 1987; 3. "Oh What a Love" Released: November 9, 1987

Hold On is the seventeenth studio album by American country folk group Nitty Gritty Dirt Band, released on July 7, 1987. The album produced three singles "Baby's Got a Hold on Me", "Fishin' in the Dark", and "Oh What a Love". This was the last Dirt Band album to feature John McEuen as a member until 2002's Will the Circle Be Unbroken, Volume III.

== Track listing ==
| No. | Title | Writer(s) | Length |
|---|---|---|---|
| 1. | "Fishin' in the Dark" | Wendy Waldman, Jim Photoglo | 3:19 |
| 2. | "Joe Knows How to Live" | Max D. Barnes, Graham Lyle, Troy Seals | 3:51 |
| 3. | "Keepin' the Road Hot" | Jeff Hanna, Bob Carpenter | 3:30 |
| 4. | "Blue Ridge Mountain Girl" | Wayland Holyfield, Richard Leigh | 3:20 |
| 5. | "Angelyne" | Bruce Springsteen | 4:10 |
| 6. | "Baby's Got a Hold on Me" | Josh Leo, Hanna, Carpenter | 3:04 |
| 7. | "Dancing to the Beat of a Broken Heart" | Wayland Holyfield, Verlon Thompson | 3:57 |
| 8. | "Oh What a Love" | Jimmy Ibbotson | 3:08 |
| 9. | "Oleanna" | Jimmie Fadden | 4:40 |
| 10. | "Tennessee" | Karen Staley | 3:05 |

== Personnel ==
- Jimmie Fadden – drums, harmonica, jaw harp, background vocals
- Jeff Hanna – vocals, guitars
- Jimmy Ibbotson – vocals, electric bass, guitars, mandolin
- Bob Carpenter – vocals, keyboards, accordion on "Angelyne"
- John McEuen – mandolin on "Tennessee", acoustic guitar on "Oh What A Love" and "Dancing to the Beat of a Broken Heart"

Additional studio musicians are heard on this recording, but are not credited on the album notes, including a dobro.

== Production ==
- Producer – Josh Leo
- * Producer – Marshall Morgan & Paul Worley for Morley Productions

== Chart performance ==
| Chart (1987) | Peak position |
|---|---|
| U.S. Billboard Top Country Albums | 14 |
