= Exchange of Hearts =

Studio album by David Slater
- Released: 1988
- Studio: Scruggs Sound (Berry Hill, Tennessee)
- Genres: Country, soft rock
- Label: Capitol
- Producer: Randy Scruggs

David Slater chronology
Exchange of Hearts (1988)	Be with Me (1989)

Singles from Exchange of Hearts
- 1. "I'm Still Your Fool"; 2. "The Other Guy"; 3. "We Were Meant to Be Lovers"; 4. "Exchange of Hearts"

Exchange of Hearts is the debut album by American singer-songwriter David Slater. It was released in 1988 on Capitol Records, and produced by Randy Scruggs. The album reached the top 40 on the Billboard Top Country Albums chart, peaking at number 33. Three of its singles charted on the Billboard Hot Country Songs chart, with the first two singles, "I'm Still Your Fool" and "The Other Guy" (Little River Band cover) reaching the top 40 at numbers 36 and 30, respectively. The third single from the album is a cover of the 1980 Jim Photoglo song "We Were Meant to Be Lovers"; this version reached number 63 on the Hot Country Songs chart.

== Critical reception ==
Wayne Bledsoe of The Knoxville News-Sentinel gave the album a positive review, calling the album "quality stuff for relaxed listening." Ron Wynn of The Commercial Appeal was mixed, considering Slater's voice "thin" on some tracks but praising Scruggs's production style.

== Track listing ==
Side one
No.	Title	Length
1.	"We Were Meant to Be Lovers" (Brian Francis Neary, Jim Photoglo)	3:39
2.	"Paintin' the Town Blue" (Bob Garfrerick, Don Parsons, Steve Jones)	3:52
3.	"The Other Guy" (Graeham Goble)	2:52
4.	"I'm Still Your Fool" (Byron Hill, Preston Sullivan)	3:32
5.	"How to Survive a Heartache" (Dennis Morgan, Stephen Allen Davis)	3:24

Side two
No.	Title	Length
1.	"I've Met My Match" (Brent Mason, David Slater, White)	3:07
2.	"Exchange of Hearts" (Slater, White)	3:34
3.	"Cry Baby" (Jerry Fuller, Joe Chemay, John Hobbs)	3:45
4.	"Rest Assured" (Slater, White)	3:10
5.	"Losin' My Louisiana Blues" (Slater, White)	3:35

== Personnel ==
Musicians

- Depp Britt - background vocals
- Sonny Garrish - steel guitar
- Steve Gibson - electric guitar
- Vince Gill - background vocals
- Jim Horn - saxophone
- Dave Innis - keyboards
- Jerry Kroon - drums, percussion
- Don Potter - acoustic guitar
- Gary Prim - keyboards
- Ron "Snake" Reynolds - percussion
- Earl Scruggs - banjo
- Randy Scruggs - acoustic guitar
- Wendy Suits - background vocals
- Dennis Wilson - background vocals
- Bob Wray - bass guitar

Technical

- Milan Bogdan - engineering
- Glenn Meadows - mastering
- Ron "Snake" Reynolds - engineering
- Randy Scruggs - producer
