= Partners, Brothers and Friends =

Studio album by Nitty Gritty Dirt Band
- Released: 1985
- Genre: Country, country rock, folk rock, bluegrass
- Label: Warner Bros. Nashville
- Producer: Marshall Morgan, Paul Worley

Nitty Gritty Dirt Band chronology
Plain Dirt Fashion (1984)	Partners, Brothers and Friends (1985)	Twenty Years of Dirt (1986)

Singles from Partners, Brothers and Friends
- 1. "Modern Day Romance" Released: June 3, 1985; 2. "Home Again in My Heart" Released: October 7, 1985; 3. "Partners, Brothers and Friends" Released: February 24, 1986

Partners, Brothers and Friends is the sixteenth studio album by American country folk group Nitty Gritty Dirt Band. The album reached #9 on the US Country charts. The three singles from this album were top 10 on the US Country charts. "Modern Day Romance" went to #1, "Home Again in My Heart" went to 3, and "Partners, Brothers and Friends" went to 6.

== Track listing ==
No.	Title	Writer(s)	Length
1.	"Modern Day Romance"	Kix Brooks, Dan Tyler	3:50
2.	"Other Side of The Hill"	Chuck Pyle	3:20
3.	"Home Again in My Heart"	Josh Leo, Wendy Waldman	3:43
4.	"Telluride"	Jimmy Ibbotson	3:08
5.	"Old Upright Piano"	Kye Fleming, Don Schlitz	3:36
6.	"Partners, Brothers and Friends"	Ibbotson, Jeff Hanna	3:14
7.	"Redneck Riviera"	Bob Carpenter, Hanna	3:27
8.	"Queen of the Road"	Steve Goodman, Hanna, Ibbotson	3:06
9.	"As Long as You're Loving Me""	Schlitz, Lisa Silver, Russell Smith	4:35
10.	"Leon McDuff"	Mike Cross	3:45

== Personnel ==
=== The Nitty Gritty Dirt Band ===
- Jeff Hanna – guitars and vocals
- Jimmy Ibbotson – bass, guitars, mandolin, vocals
- Jimmie Fadden – drums and harmonica
- Bob Carpenter – keyboards and vocals
- John McEuen – guitars, mandolin, fiddle, banjo and lap steel

=== Additional Musicians ===
- Guitar: Jerry Douglas, Josh Leo, Paul Worley.
  Steel guitar: Sonny Garrish. Mandolin: Sam Bush
- Bass: Joe Osborn, Larry Paxton
- Keyboards: Dennis Burnside
- Drums: Eddie Bayers, James Stroud
- Percussion: Tom Roady
- Fiddle: Ricky Skaggs, Blaine Sprouse

== Chart performance ==
Chart (1985)	Peak position
U.S. Billboard Top Country Albums	9
