= Nitty Gritty Ibbotson =

Studio album by Jimmy Ibbotson
- Released: 1977
- Genre: Country/Country rock/Folk rock/Bluegrass
- Label: First American
- Producer: Dik Darnell

Jimmy Ibbotson chronology
Nitty Gritty Ibbotson (1977)	Wild Jimbos (1991)

Nitty Gritty Ibbotson is the first solo album by Nitty Gritty Dirt Band member, Jimmy Ibbotson, released in 1977. Ibbotson left the Nitty Gritty Dirt Band at the end 1975, but rejoined them a few years later.

The song, "Sara", was later recorded as "Sarah in the Summer" by Ibbotson as a member of the Wild Jimbos and the Nitty Gritty Dirt Band. The Wild Jimbos included it on their debut album Wild Jimbos in 1991. The Nitty Gritty Dirt Band included it on their 1994 album Acoustic. The version on Nitty Gritty Ibbotson has a different ending. He sings about "driving this road as a gay divorcee" and being an "hour closer to Sandy in the summer". It is a safe assumption that this is about his ex-wife Sandy and their daughter Sarah Jean, and that they were divorced before the LP was released in 1977.

== Track listing ==
All tracks composed by Jimmy Ibbotson; except where noted.

1. "Bitter Cup" - 4:00
2. "Sharing" - 3:50
3. "Blastin' Through the Southland" - 2:36
4. "Hot Memphis Night" (Gerard McMahon) - 5:19
5. "Rent a Boat" - 3:17
6. "The Saga of Big Dave" - 3:00
7. "Town The Bomb Build" - 3:10
8. "Atlanta Saga" - 3:14
9. "Sara" - 4:00
10. "Firelines" - 3:33

== Personnel ==
- Larry Thomson - drums, percussion
- Hilliard Wilson - bass
- Steve Sykes - electric guitar
- Albert Campbell - electric piano, ARP
- John Macy - steel guitar
- Dik Darnell - acoustic piano
- Paul Vastola - Moog
- Gerard McMahon - ARP
- Ray Bonneville - harmonica
- Pete Waznor - acoustic piano
- Stan Rogers - trombone
- Philip McLourd - saxophone
- Pam Addington Grazier, Rene Ulibarri, Pam & Mike Martin - backing vocals
- Jimmy Ibbotson - acoustic & electric guitar, lead & backing vocals

== Production ==
- Producer - Dik Darnell
- Hot Memphis Night co-produced by Gerard McMahon & Dik Darnell
