= Ibbinet Companion =

Ibbinet Companion 1.5

Studio album by Jimmy Ibbotson
- Released: 1998
- Label: Unami Records

Jimmy Ibbotson chronology
Wild Jimbos Two (1993)	Ibbinet Companion 1.5 (1998)	This Is It (1999)

Ibbinet Companion # 1.5 is a 1998 solo album by Jimmy Ibbotson of the Nitty Gritty Dirt Band.

== Track listing ==
1. "The Girl From The North End Of The Island"
2. "The Luncheonette"
3. "Miss Maudey"
4. "It's Morning"
5. "The Parade Of The Casino Elephants"
6. "Everyone's Gonna Love Goin' Downhill From Here"
7. "Tiny Lou Lou"
8. "Baby Tonite"
9. "Geraldo's Tequila"
10. "Try Not To Cry"
11. "Drive It Like It Is"
12. "Wheels"
13. "Sugar Babe"
14. "NGDB Calypso # 1"
15. "Mr. Bojangles"
16. "Ripplin' Waters"

== Personnel ==
- Jimmy Ibbotson - guitar, mandolin, vocals

with:

- John McEuen
- Tracy McLain
