= Workin' Band =

Studio album by Nitty Gritty Dirt Band
- Released: 1988
- Genre: Country, country rock, folk rock, bluegrass
- Label: Warner Bros. Nashville
- Producer: Josh Leo

Nitty Gritty Dirt Band chronology
Hold On (1987)	Workin' Band (1988)	More Great Dirt (1989)

Professional ratings
Review scores
Source	Rating
AllMusic	3/5 stars

Workin' Band is the eighteenth studio album by American country folk group Nitty Gritty Dirt Band, released in 1988. The album peaked at No. 33 on the US country albums chart. "Workin' Man (Nowhere to Go)" and "I've Been Lookin'" were released as singles, each reaching the top ten of the Billboard country singles chart. This was their first album to feature Bernie Leadon, who replaced founding member John McEuen, because he left for a solo career.

== Track listing ==
No.	Title	Writer(s)	Length
1.	"Workin' Man (Nowhere to Go)"	Jimmie Fadden	3:50
2.	"I've Been Lookin'"	Jimmy Ibbotson, Jeff Hanna	3:20
3.	"Soldier of Love"	Richard "Spady" Brannan, Anthony Crawford, David Malloy	3:43
4.	"Down That Road Tonight"	Jeff Hanna, Josh Leo, Wendy Waldman	3:08
5.	"Baby Blues"	Bob Carpenter, Waldman	3:36
6.	"Corduroy Road"	Bernie Leadon	3:14
7.	"Johnny O"	Leo, Waldman	3:27
8.	"Thunder and Lightnin'"	Val & Birdie	3:06
9.	"A Lot Like Me"	Carpenter	4:35
10.	"Living Without You"	Kevin Welch, J. Fred Knobloch	3:45
11.	"Brass Sky"	Ibbotson	5:13
12.	"I've Been Lookin (Reprise)"		:30

== Personnel ==
- Jeff Hanna – vocals, acoustic and electric guitar
- Jimmie Fadden – vocals, drums, harmonica, jaw harp, percussion
- Jimmy Ibbotson – vocals, bass, guitars, mandolin, mandola, percussion
- Bob Carpenter – vocals, piano, synthesizer, accordion, keyboard bass
- Bernie Leadon – vocals, acoustic and electric guitar, 5-string banjo, mandolin, mandocello, slide guitar

Other musicians:

- Josh Leo – electric and acoustic guitar
- Larry Paxton – electric bass
- Mark O'Connor – fiddle

== Production ==
- Producer – Josh Leo

== Chart performance ==
Chart (1988)	Peak position
US Top Country Albums (Billboard)	33
