= Fool in Love with You =

Single by Jim Photoglo

from the album Fool in Love With You
- B-side: "Ruled by My Heart" "Angelina" (West Germany)
- Released: April 1981
- Genre: Soft rock
- Length: 3:30
- Label: 20th Century
- Songwriters: Jim Photoglo, Brian Neary
- Producer: Brian Neary

Jim Photoglo singles chronology
"We Were Meant to Be Lovers" (1980)	"Fool in Love with You" (1981)	"Tonight Will Last Forever" (1981)

Alternative cover art
- Title track of LP

"Fool in Love with You" is a 1981 song by Jim Photoglo. It is the title track of his second album and the first release from the LP, although it was his second single to chart.

"Fool in Love with You" is Photoglo's most successful song, reaching number 25 on the U.S. Billboard Hot 100 and number 23 on Cash Box. It spent four months on the American charts.

The song was a bigger Adult Contemporary hit, reaching #11 in Canada and #12 U.S.

== Chart history ==
=== Weekly charts ===
Chart (1981)	Peak position
Canadian RPM Adult Contemporary	11
US Billboard Hot 100	25
US Billboard Adult Contemporary	12
US Cash Box Top 100	23
