= Turn of the Century (song) =

Single by Nitty Gritty Dirt Band

from the album Will the Circle Be Unbroken: Volume Two
- B-side: "Blues Berry Hill"
- Released: May 13, 1989
- Genre: Country
- Length: 3:39
- Label: Universal
- Songwriters: J. Fred Knobloch, Dan Tyler
- Producers: Randy Scruggs, Nitty Gritty Dirt Band

Nitty Gritty Dirt Band singles chronology
"Down That Road Tonight" (1988)	"Turn of the Century" (1989)	"And So It Goes" (1989)

"Turn of the Century" is a song recorded by American country music group Nitty Gritty Dirt Band. It was released in May 1989 as the first single from their Will the Circle Be Unbroken: Volume Two compilation album. The song reached #27 on the Billboard Hot Country Singles & Tracks chart. The song was written by J. Fred Knobloch and Dan Tyler.

== Chart performance ==
Chart (1989)	Peak position
US Hot Country Songs (Billboard)	27
Canadian RPM Country Tracks	24
