= Fishin' in the Dark =

Single by Nitty Gritty Dirt Band

from the album Hold On
- B-side: "Keepin' the Road Hot"
- Released: June 7, 1987
- Genre: Country rock
- Length: 3:19
- Label: Warner Bros. Nashville
- Songwriters: Wendy Waldman; Jim Photoglo
- Producer: Josh Leo

Nitty Gritty Dirt Band singles chronology
"Baby's Got a Hold on Me" (1987)	"Fishin' in the Dark" (1987)	"Oh What a Love" (1987)

"Fishin' in the Dark" is a song written by Wendy Waldman and Jim Photoglo, and recorded by American country music group Nitty Gritty Dirt Band, with Jimmy Ibbotson singing lead vocals. It was released on June 7, 1987, as the second single from their album Hold On. The song reached number one on the country charts of both Billboard in the United States and RPM in Canada, and has been described as the band's signature song.

== Content ==
The song is about a couple who plan to have a romantic encounter together at night while fishing. "Fishin' in the Dark" has a fast tempo in the key of D major, with its verses based mainly around an open fifth consisting of D and A. Jimmy Ibbotson, then the band's bass guitarist, sings lead vocals.

Co-writer Jim Photoglo, a native of California, made trips to Nashville, Tennessee, in 1984 at the suggestion of songwriter Wendy Waldman. While staying at a Shoney's Inn in Nashville, he began playing open fifths on his guitar into a tape recorder. Waldman suggested the title "Fishin' in the Dark" after listening to A Prairie Home Companion on the radio. As both they and record producer Josh Leo lived in the same apartment complex, Leo became aware of the song and recommended it to Nitty Gritty Dirt Band, for whom he was producing at the time. Before the band recorded it, Ed Bruce also included a version on his 1986 album Night Things.

Almost three decades after the song's release, Photoglo would join Nitty Gritty Dirt Band, taking over for Ibbotson on bass guitar.

== Critical reception ==
Kevin John Coyne of Country Universe gave the song an "A", stating that "The lyrics paint such a clear picture that you feel you're out on the water with this young couple getting ready to do some fishin' in the dark. No word on whether they catch any fish, but they're definitely catching feelings, and that's the secret sauce of this little gem. It captures the euphoria of those early days of a new romance, where the activity doesn't matter so much as the chance to be alone together". Group member Jeff Hanna later stated that the song was considered Nitty Gritty Dirt Band's signature song, and became most popular during summertime. It was certified platinum by the Recording Industry Association of America (RIAA), honoring one million certified music downloads, on September 12, 2014.

== Charts and certification ==
=== Weekly charts ===
Chart (1987)	Peak position
U.S. Billboard Hot Country Songs	1
Canadian RPM Country Tracks	1

=== Certifications ===
Region	Certification	Certified units/sales
United States (RIAA)	Platinum	1,129,000

=== Year-end charts ===
Chart (1987)	Position
US Hot Country Songs (Billboard)	4
