= I've Been Lookin' =

Single by Nitty Gritty Dirt Band

from the album Workin' Band
- B-side: "Must Be Love"
- Released: August 1988
- Genre: Country
- Length: 3:10
- Label: Warner Bros. Nashville
- Songwriters: Jeff Hanna, Jimmy Ibbotson
- Producer: Josh Leo

Nitty Gritty Dirt Band singles chronology
"Workin' Man (Nowhere to Go)" (1988)	"I've Been Lookin'" (1988)	"Down That Road Tonight" (1989)

"I've Been Lookin'" is a song written by Jeff Hanna and Jimmy Ibbotson, and recorded by American country music group Nitty Gritty Dirt Band. It was released in August 1988 as the second single from the album Workin' Band. The song reached No. 2 on the Billboard Hot Country Singles & Tracks chart.

== Charts ==
=== Weekly charts ===
Chart (1988)	Peak position
US Hot Country Songs (Billboard)	2
Canadian RPM Country Tracks	1

=== Year-end charts ===
Chart (1988)	Position
US Hot Country Songs (Billboard)	80
