= Partners, Brothers and Friends (song) =

Single by Nitty Gritty Dirt Band

from the album Partners, Brothers and Friends
- B-side: "Redneck Riviera"
- Released: February 24, 1986
- Genre: Country
- Length: 4:00
- Label: Warner Bros. Nashville
- Songwriter(s): Jeff Hanna, Jimmy Ibbotson
- Producer(s): Marshall Morgan, Paul Worley

Nitty Gritty Dirt Band singles chronology
"Home Again in My Heart" (1985)	"Partners, Brothers and Friends" (1986)	"Stand a Little Rain" (1986)

"Partners, Brothers and Friends" is a song written by Jeff Hanna and Jimmy Ibbotson and recorded by American country music group Nitty Gritty Dirt Band. It was released in February 1986 as the third single and title track from the album Partners, Brothers and Friends. The song reached number 6 on the Billboard Hot Country Singles & Tracks chart.

== Background ==
WBOS producer, Mark Tudor told Billboard that the song talks about the music business. He goes on to say that "losing bullets and discount bins" could become a household name if the media picks up on the birthday/business connection.

== Music video ==
The music video was directed by Gary Gutierrez and premiered in mid-1986. The video combines live action sequences with animated photography and centers around the band on tour. It also shows vintage concert footage since the founding of the band.

== Chart performance ==
Chart (1986)	Peak position
US Hot Country Songs (Billboard)	6
Canadian RPM Country Tracks	3
