= Jim Salestrom =

American singer-songwriter (1956–2023)

James Kevin Salestrom (February 20, 1956 – November 22, 2023) was an American singer-songwriter. Salestrom was the lead singer of the band Timberline from 1971 to 1977. Salestrom performed in Dolly Parton's band from 1979 to 1991. As a solo artist, he performed in shows around the world.

== Biography ==
James Kevin Salestrom was born in Omaha, Nebraska on February 20, 1956. He co-founded the country-folk rock band Timberline in 1971, in which he was the lead singer and primary songwriter, along with his brother Chuck Salestrom, Dugg Duggan, Craig Link, and Bill Howland. His song, "It's Too Soon to Let Our Love End", was recorded by Mary MacGregor on her album, Torn Between Two Lovers (1976).

In 1979, Salestrom joined Dolly Parton's band as a singer and musician, playing acoustic, electric, and high-string guitars and banjo.

Salestrom won two Regional Emmys, three Colorado Broadcast Awards and his recording, All The Colors, was nominated for a Grammy for Outstanding Children's Album in 1997.

Salestrom died from cancer at his home in Arvada, Colorado, on November 22, 2023, at the age of 67.

== Discography ==
- Timberline - The Great Timber Rush (1977)
- Limited Edition (1981)
- Blue River Dreamin' (1983)
- Genuine Colorado (1984)
- Look Through Any Window (1986)
- Dollywood Kids (1988)
- Step In Time (1990)
- Wild Jimbos with Jim Ratts and Jimmy Ibbotson (1991)
- Grateful (1992)
- A Collection (1992)
- Wild Jimbos Two with Jim Ratts and Jimmy Ibbotson (1993)
- The Christmas Tree (1993)
- The Great Adventure (1994)
- Colorado Collection (1995)
- A Collection For Children (1995)
- So Far So Good (1996)
- The Messenger (1996)
- All The Colors (1996)
- Western Winds (1997)
- Welcome to Garden Street (1997)
- The Colorado Crossroads (1998)
- Distant Eyes (1999)
- Safe Home (2001)
- Music From The Mountains (2003)
- Music From The Grand Canyon (2003)
- Fresh Tracks (2004)
- A Colorado Christmas (2004)
- Two Friends with Pete Huttlinger (2005)
- Open Spaces (2006)
- Beneath The Big Sky (2008)
- Music For The Heart, From The Broadmoor with Ken Miller (2008)
- Life's Good (2010)
- Nautilus (2012)
- Sweet Doin' Nothing (2013)
- Jim & James Salestrom | Live In Kearney (2017)
- Crossroads (2017)
- Shady Pine (2017)
- Jim and James Salestrom | Live At The World Theatre (2019)
- National Repertory Orchestra - John Denver Tribute (2019)
- Library (2019)
- Someday We Will Make It (2020)
- Timberline 50th Reunion Live (2021)
- The Book of Life ~ Grateful (2022)
- And So It Goes (2023)

== Appeared on other recordings ==
- Children of the Universe - Jim Horn
- Country Suite - Dave Loggins
- Different Directions - John Denver
- Dolly In London - Dolly Parton
- Dolly, Dolly, Dolly - Dolly Parton
- Folks Live! - Various
- Heartbreak Express - Dolly Parton
- Radio AAHS - Various
- The 1992 Telluride Bluegrass Festival
- The Wild West

== Honors ==
- Emmy Awards 1993 nominee
- Emmy Awards 1997 winner
- Grammy Awards 1997 nominee
