= Fire in the Sky (song) =

Single by Nitty Gritty Dirt Band

from the album Twenty Years of Dirt
- B-side: "Cadillac Ranch"
- Released: November 15, 1986
- Genre: Country
- Length: 4:40
- Label: Warner Bros. Nashville
- Songwriters: Jeff Hanna, Bob Carpenter
- Producers: Jeff Hanna, Bob Edwards

Nitty Gritty Dirt Band singles chronology
"Stand a Little Rain" (1986)	"Fire in the Sky" (1986)	"Baby's Got a Hold on Me" (1987)

"Fire in the Sky" is a song recorded by American country music group Nitty Gritty Dirt Band. The song was first released in 1981 and peaked at number 76 on the Billboard Hot 100. In November 1986, the song was released to the country music format, peaking at number 7 on the Hot Country Songs charts and number five on the Canadian country charts. The song features a guest vocal by Kenny Loggins, along with saxophones played by Bryan Savage and Al Garth. This song was written by group members Jeff Hanna and Bob Carpenter.

== Chart performance ==
Chart (1981)	Peak position
US Billboard Hot 100	76
Chart (1986–1987)	Peak position
US Hot Country Songs (Billboard)	7
Canadian RPM Country Tracks	5
