= When It's Gone =

Single by Nitty Gritty Dirt Band

from the album Will the Circle Be Unbroken: Volume Two
- B-side: "I'm Sittin' on Top of the World"
- Released: October 1989
- Genre: Country
- Length: 2:35
- Label: Universal
- Songwriters: Jimmie Fadden, Don Schlitz
- Producers: Randy Scruggs, Nitty Gritty Dirt Band

Nitty Gritty Dirt Band singles chronology
"And So It Goes" (1989)	"When It's Gone" (1989)	"One Step Over the Line" (1990)

"When It's Gone" is a song written by Jimmie Fadden and Don Schlitz, and recorded by American country music group Nitty Gritty Dirt Band. It was released in October 1989 as the third single from their compilation album Will the Circle Be Unbroken: Volume Two. The song reached number 10 on the Billboard Hot Country Singles & Tracks chart. It was the band's last top 10 hit.

== Chart performance ==
Chart (1989)	Peak position
Canada Country Singles (RPM)	11
US Hot Country Songs (Billboard)	10
