= Plain Dirt Fashion =

Studio album by Nitty Gritty Dirt Band
- Released: 1984
- Genre: Country, country rock
- Label: Warner Bros. Nashville
- Producer: Marshall Morgan, Paul Worley

Nitty Gritty Dirt Band chronology
Let's Go (1983)	Plain Dirt Fashion (1984)	Partners, Brothers and Friends (1985)

Singles from Plain Dirt Fashion
- 1. "Long Hard Road (The Sharecropper's Dream)" Released: May 21, 1984; 2. "I Love Only You" Released: September 17, 1984; 3. "High Horse" Released: January 7, 1985

Professional ratings
Review scores
Source	Rating
AllMusic	2/5 stars

Plain Dirt Fashion is the fifteenth studio album by American country folk group Nitty Gritty Dirt Band, released in 1984 by the record label Warner Bros. Records. This album went to No. 8 on the US Country charts. The three singles from this album all charted in the top 3. "Long Hard Road (The Sharecropper's Dream)" went to 1, "I Love Only You" went to 3, and "High Horse" went to 2. The album is noteworthy for covers of both Meat Loaf's 1978 hit "Two Out of Three Ain't Bad" and Bruce Springsteen's 1981 single "Cadillac Ranch".

== Track listing ==
No.	Title	Writer(s)	Length
1.	"Long Hard Road (The Sharecropper's Dream)"	Rodney Crowell	3:20
2.	"High Horse"	Jimmy Ibbotson	3:15
3.	"Face on the Cutting Room Floor"	Steve Goodman, Jeff Hanna, Ibbotson	3:11
4.	"Two Out of Three Ain't Bad"	Jim Steinman	3:20
5.	"Must Be Love"	Bob Carpenter, Hanna, Gram Parsons	3:37
6.	"I Love Only You"	Dave Loggins, Don Schlitz	3:29
7.	"Run with Me"	Marshall Crenshaw	2:58
8.	"Cadillac Ranch"	Bruce Springsteen	3:43
9.	"'Til the Fire's Burned Out"	Hugh Moffatt	3:29
10.	"Video Tape"	Goodman	3:00

== Personnel ==
- Jeff Hanna – guitars and vocals
- Jimmy Ibbotson – bass, guitars, mandolin, vocals
- Jimmie Fadden – drums and harmonica
- Bob Carpenter – keyboards and vocals
- John McEuen – guitars, mandolin, fiddle, banjo and lap steel

Additional musicians

- Bass – Joe Osborn, Larry Paxton
- Drums – Eddie Bayers, James Stroud
- Keyboards – Dennis Burnside
- Acoustic guitar – Steve Gibson, Paul Worley
- Electric guitar – Steve Gibson, Paul Worley, Reggie Young
- Fiddle – Mark O'Connor, Ricky Skaggs, Blaine Sprouse
- Dobro – Jerry "Flux" Douglas
- Steel guitar – Sonny Garrish

Production

- Producer – Marshall Morgan and Paul Worley

== Charts ==
=== Weekly charts ===
Chart (1984)	Peak position
Canadian Country Albums (RPM)	5
US Top Country Albums (Billboard)	8

=== Year-end charts ===
Chart (1985)	Position
US Top Country Albums (Billboard)	25
