= Star Search =

American television series

- Genre: Interactive reality game show
- Created by: Al Masini
- Written by: Sam Riddle; Al Masini; Phil Kellard; Tom Shatz; Jerrod Cardwell; Scott C. Voss
- Directed by: Tony Charmoli; Tim Kiley; Greg V. Fera; Glenn Weiss
- Presented by: Ed McMahon; Martha Quinn; Arsenio Hall; Anthony Anderson
- Narrated by: Sam Riddle; Beau Weaver
- Theme music composer: Joey Carbone and Carol Connors (1983–1994)
- Opening theme: Theme From Star Search ("You Can Be A Star")
- Country of origin: United States
- Original language: English
- No. of seasons: 17

Production
- Executive producers: Al Masini; Bob Banner; Gay Rosenthal; Andrew J. Golder; Todd Wagner; Dan Funk; Mark Cuban
- Producers: Sam Riddle; Michele Butin; Donna Michelle Anderson
- Running time: 60 minutes
- Production companies: Bob Banner Associates (1983–1988); Metromedia Television (1983–1986); Television Program Enterprises (1983–1993); Rysher TPE (1993–94); Rysher Entertainment (1994); 2929 Productions (2003–2004); A.Gold.er Productions (2003–2004); CBS Productions (2003–2004); Clover Entertainment (2026); Jesse Collins Entertainment (2026)

Original release
- Network: Syndication
- Release: September 10, 1983 – May 20, 1995
- Network: CBS
- Release: January 8, 2003 – March 13, 2004
- Network: Netflix
- Release: January 20, 2026 – present

Star Search (later known as Ed McMahon's Star Search) is an American television show that was produced by T.P.E./Rysher Entertainment from 1983 to 1995, hosted by Ed McMahon, and created by Al Masini. A relaunch was produced by 2929 Productions from 2003 to 2004, with another launched on Netflix in 2026. On all versions of the show, contestants competed in several genres of entertainment. The show was originally filmed at the Earl Carroll Theatre at 6230 Sunset Blvd. in Hollywood; it was later filmed at the Disney-MGM Studios in Orlando, Florida.

== 1983–1995 version ==
While categories varied slightly from season to season, the ten basic categories during the 1983–1995 version were:

- Female singer
- Male singer
- Junior singer (Second half of the season)
- Teen singer (First half of the season)
- Group vocal
- Dance
- Junior dance (First half of the season)
- Teen dance (Second half of the season)
- Spokesmodel
- Comedy

The original Star Search logo, used from 1983 to 1994

The Star Search logo used from 1994 to 1995

Eight categories were contested per show. Potential contestants auditioned to be on the show. In each category, two selected contestants would compete, a champion and a challenger. The challenger would usually perform first, while the champion performed second. In later seasons, the champion performed first.

All acts were judged by a panel of four judges, and each judge could award an act from one to four stars (later changed to five stars). Once both acts were complete, Ed would reveal the scores, and the best average won. If there was a tie, a studio audience vote broke the tie, in which case the results were revealed at the end of the show.

Any performer must win at least several shows in a row, depending on the number of shows left in the season, to earn an entry into the next round of the competition; usually this was three or four wins in a row. In later seasons, three-match winners were automatically retired. In this case, two new performers would compete in that category the following week.

In most seasons, two semifinal shows took place, one in the fall, the other in the spring, prior to the championship show. Each semifinal used seven judges. No scoring was used, and the judges' votes weren't revealed, but the acts that won their semifinals would then compete in the championship show.

On the championship show, winners of Male Vocalist, Female Vocalist, Vocal Group, Comedy, and Dance, were awarded $100,000 but no record contract was guaranteed. Many Star Search winners from the early seasons secured recording contracts within a few weeks of the end of the competition—first season vocal group winner Sawyer Brown, first season male vocalist champion Sam Harris and second season male vocalist champion Durell Coleman were the first three, and were later followed by second season vocal group winner Limited Warranty, third season female vocalist champion Linda Eder, second season junior male vocalist champion Jimmy Salvemini, whose album was produced by Luther Vandross, fourth season male vocalist champion David Slater, and third season junior female vocalist runner-up Tiffany. Despite not winning her competition (she lost to Melissa Moultrie), Tiffany, performing as 'Tiffany Renee,' was the first Star Search alumna to land a #1 hit, with her cover of the Top 5 Tommy James and the Shondells hit "I Think We're Alone Now" —actually improving on the original single's chart performance. The winner of the Spokesmodel category was awarded $100,000 and a contract with a well-known modeling agency. The first Spokesmodel winner was Tracey Ross, who later became a leading actress on the soap opera Passions. Winners of Junior Vocalist, Junior Dance, Teen Vocalist, and Teen Dance win $10,000.

In early seasons, before the three match limit rule was adopted, the grand champions were determined by how long a champion held their title. While it is believed that Sam Harris holds the record for longest championship, at 14 weeks in Season 1, Harris was actually defeated by singer Beau Williams on Harris' 14th attempt. This record is actually held by singer Durell Coleman (1985), who won the $100,000 on Season 2 with 15 wins and no defeats.

In the 1992–93 season, a daily version of the show aired but was cancelled midseason.

In the 1993–1994 season, the title was changed to "Ed McMahon's Star Search."

Former MTV veejay Martha Quinn joined the series as co-host for the 1994–95 season, judging the musical groups competition.

Star Search was typically syndicated on Fox Television Stations (before October 1986, Metromedia, Inc.), stations owned by the Gaylord Broadcasting Co., stations owned by Taft Broadcasting, and stations owned by Cox Communications.

== 2003–2004 version ==
In the wake of American Idol's success, Arsenio Hall hosted a new version of Star Search, which ran from 2003 to 2004 on CBS. It would be rerun on GSN from 2004 to 2005. This new version was judged by four panelists, including Ben Stein, Naomi Judd, Ahmet Zappa and a rotating celebrity panelist (which in at least one case was McMahon himself). Among the winners were singer Tiffany Evans, comedian John Roy and singer Mark Mejia.

The revival consisted of four seasons. For the first season, the categories were Adult and Junior Singer, Comedy, and Modeling. In seasons two and three, Modeling was replaced with Dance. In the final season, the Comedy category was scrapped altogether and only the singing and dancing categories remained.

For the first three seasons, two new competitors faced off. The three house judges, along with the one celebrity judge, gave each contestant a score on a scale from one to five stars, making a maximum studio score 20 stars. During each commercial break, the home audience went to www.cbs.com/star to rate the competitors who just performed. Each performer could earn up to another 20 stars from the home audience. In the climactic moment before the score from the home audience was revealed, Hall would often say, "Hit me with the digits!"

When the scores were tallied, the higher scoring performer won. If the score was tied, then Hall would read off each performer's score rounded to the nearest hundredth (the at-home score was initially rounded down to the nearest star, unless there was a tie). That performer would then go on to the next round of competition. The only real exception to this format during the first three seasons was that three people competed in the semi-final rounds, not two. After the first three seasons, a special, "Battle of the Best" show took place, where the three Adult Singer, Junior Singer, Comedian, and two Young Dancer Grand Champions (Modeling was only the first season, and Dance had only been around for two seasons) were brought back to face off for an additional $100,000.

For the fourth and final season, three contestants in Adult Singer, Junior Singer, and Dance were brought back to initially compete (Comedy was dropped, jokingly because Naomi gave many comics only one star). The three brought back in each category were not necessarily the Grand Champions of their season. The show scrapped the celebrity judge and had three house judges for the entire series: Naomi Judd, MC Lyte, and Matti Leshem (who tried to berate contestants as Simon Cowell was doing at the time on American Idol).

As in past seasons, two new contestants competed. With only three judges, a score of 15 stars was possible, and ties were broken by a majority vote between the three. This is where the former contestants came in. Initially, in each category, these three performers made up the "Winner's Circle". The winning challenger then had the chance to challenge one of the three performers in his or her respective winner's circle. The winner's circle performer then had to beat or tie the bar set by the challenger; ties were automatically given to the Winner's Circle performer. If they couldn't beat the score, they were out of the competition, and the challenger took his or her place in the Winner's Circle.

Halfway through the program, the three performers in each Winner's Circle competed against each other in a special show. The winner in each category not only received a trip home, but a free pass to the final show. From then on, there were only two people who could be challenged in each Winner's Circle. In the final show, the three people in each Winner's Circle competed against each other for $100,000, but the judges were only allowed to give opinions and not allowed to score. This, along with the Free Pass show, were the only two shows which re-adopted the at-home voting concept.

- The Adult Singer group was the only group to record a complete shutout. The three performers in the beginning were there in the end as well.
- The free pass was equally important in the other two groups as well. In both the Dance and Junior Singer categories, not only did the free pass save the winner from being challenged in an ever-changing Winner's Circle, but they ended up winning their group finals (Junior Singer Mark Mejia and Dancer Jon Cruz).
- Adult Singer and season 1 champion Jake Simpson was challenged a record four times during his tenure in the Winner's Circle. He not only went a perfect 4–0, but he also won his group final. The only match he lost that entire season was the Winner's Circle Square-Off Special.

At the same time, a spin-off called Star Search – Das Duell der Stars von Morgen was produced and aired in Germany, but with less success than the more popular show Deutschland sucht den Superstar, the German version of the Idol franchise.

== 2026 version ==
Announced in May 2025, a reboot of Star Search premiered on January 20, 2026 on Netflix, with Anthony Anderson taking on hosting duties with Jelly Roll, Sarah Michelle Gellar and Chrissy Teigen as judges. Before being corrected, the promo mistakenly claimed Conan O'Brien was a contestant of the show, as mentioned by O'Brien on his podcast.

The winner for this season was magician TJ Salta, who also won a cash prize of $500,000. Fellow magician Harry Merlin Piper finished as the runner-up.
