= Oh What a Love =

Single by Nitty Gritty Dirt Band

from the album Hold On
- B-side: "America, My Sweetheart"
- Released: November 9, 1987
- Genre: Country, country rock
- Length: 3:08
- Label: Warner Bros. Nashville
- Songwriter: Jimmy Ibbotson
- Producers: Marshall Morgan, Paul Worley

Nitty Gritty Dirt Band singles chronology
"Fishin' in the Dark" (1987)	"Oh What a Love" (1987)	"Workin' Man (Nowhere to Go)" (1988)

"Oh What a Love" is a song written by Jimmy Ibbotson, and recorded by American country music group Nitty Gritty Dirt Band. It was released in November 1987 as the third single from the album Hold On. They reached number 5 on the Billboard Hot Country Singles & Tracks chart. The b-side of this single is America, My Sweetheart (George Green / Rick Giles). The label says "B Side not available on any album".

== Charts ==
=== Weekly charts ===
Chart (1987–1988)	Peak position
US Hot Country Songs (Billboard)	5

=== Year-end charts ===
Chart (1988)	Position
US Hot Country Songs (Billboard)	93
