= High Horse (Nitty Gritty Dirt Band song) =

Single by Nitty Gritty Dirt Band

from the album Plain Dirt Fashion
- B-side: "Must Be Love"
- Released: January 7, 1985
- Genre: Country rock
- Length: 3:15
- Label: Warner Bros. Nashville
- Songwriter(s): Jimmy Ibbotson
- Producer(s): Marshall Morgan, Paul Worley

Nitty Gritty Dirt Band singles chronology
"I Love Only You" (1984)	"High Horse" (1985)	"Modern Day Romance" (1985)

"High Horse" is a song written by Jimmy Ibbotson, and recorded by American country music group Nitty Gritty Dirt Band. It was released in January 1985 as the third single from the album Plain Dirt Fashion and reached number 2 on the Billboard Hot Country Singles & Tracks chart.

== Charts ==
=== Weekly charts ===
Chart (1985)	Peak position
US Hot Country Songs (Billboard)	2
Canadian RPM Country Tracks	2

=== Year-end charts ===
Chart (1985)	Position
US Hot Country Songs (Billboard)	32
