= David Slater =

American singer and songwriter (born 1962)

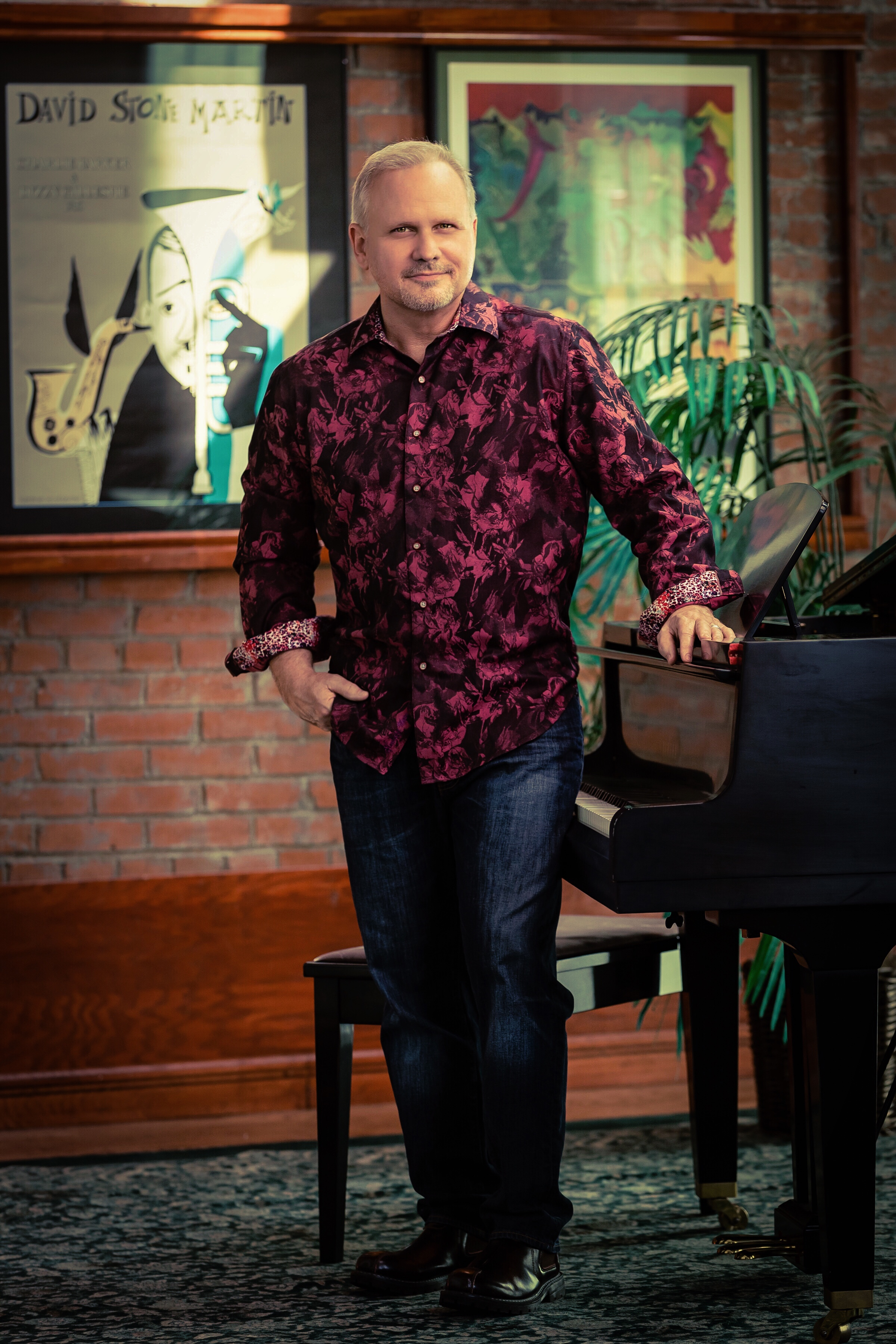
- Slater in 2020

Background information
- Born: David Nelson Slater; November 22, 1962 (age 63); Dallas, Texas, U.S.
- Origin: Nashville, Tennessee, U.S.
- Genre: Country
- Occupations: Singer, songwriter
- Instruments: Vocals, guitars, keyboards
- Years active: 1987–1989
- Label: Capitol Nashville

David Nelson Slater (born November 22, 1962) is an American singer and songwriter, as well as a minister. He was the male vocalist winner of the television talent show Star Search in 1987, which led to a contract with Capitol Records. He recorded two albums for the label and charted two singles within top 40 of the Billboard Hot Country Songs charts.

== Career ==
David Nelson Slater was born November 22, 1962 in Dallas, Texas. Slater began performing at age nine and learned how to play guitar when in high school. In the 1980s, he moved to Searcy, Arkansas, to attend Harding University, where he decided on becoming a country music singer. To facilitate this career choice, he transferred to David Lipscomb College in Nashville, Tennessee. There, he began performing at local venues as part of a local band called Slater, Wells, and Company. His exposure in this capacity led to him writing several songs, including "People's Court", which was recorded by Ray Stevens. He also began touring as a keyboardist for a number of musicians including Keith Whitley. A friend of his was a vocalist in a gospel music group called the Cumberland Boys, who at the time were one of many acts performing at the former Opryland USA theme park in Nashville. When the friend became unable to perform, Slater filled in for him. While doing so, he was discovered by agents for the television talent show Star Search. He competed on the show and was named the competition's male vocalist of the year in 1987, which also led to a contract with Capitol Records.

=== Musical career ===
Capitol Records released his debut album Exchange of Hearts on February 10, 1988. Produced by Randy Scruggs, it included backing musicians such as Vince Gill, Don Potter, Dave Innis (then of Restless Heart), and Earl Scruggs, the last of whom is Randy's father. Slater also wrote several of the songs in the project including the title track. Three singles from the project all charted on the Billboard Hot Country Songs charts. First was "I'm Still Your Fool" at number 36. Capitol Records promoted the album by selling it at $6.98, which was two dollars less than the normal price of an album in the United States at the time. The label also filmed a music video for "I'm Still Your Fool", and promoted him through appearances at radio stations. Additionally, he was booked as an opening act for Lee Greenwood. This was followed by a cover of Little River Band's "The Other Guy" at number 30. Wayne Bledsoe of The Knoxville News-Sentinel gave the album a positive review, calling the album "quality stuff for relaxed listening." Ron Wynn of The Commercial Appeal was mixed, considering Slater's voice "thin" on some tracks but praising Scruggs's production style.

A second album for Capitol, Be with Me, followed in 1989. This, too, was produced by Randy Scruggs. While recording the album, Slater was contacted by Graeham Goble, then a member of the Little River Band, to compliment Slater's cover of "The Other Guy". This led to both Goble and Wayne Nelson, also a member of the band at the time, providing backing vocals on Be with Me. The singles "She Will" and "Whatcha Gonna Do About Her" charted from this project, although neither made top 40 on Hot Country Songs. Also in 1989, Slater was shortlisted for the Academy of Country Music Award for New Male Artist of the Year. After this album's release, Slater made a number of appearances on the Grand Ole Opry and also served as an opening act for Mel Tillis at his theater in Branson, Missouri. Jim Fogelson, a music executive who was the president of Capitol Records's Nashville division at the time, noted that Slater's two albums were unsuccessful, and theorized that the singer was "torn" about his career.

== Musical styles ==
Bledsoe, in a review of Exchange of Hearts, compared Slater's musical stylings to those of Kenny Rogers, and thought Slater's style would prove popular despite Rogers's decline in popularity at the time. He also stated that Slater "isn't an innovator. He isn't exciting, but he doesn't sound like he's in a coma either." Slater observed that he sang country pop at a time when neotraditional country was starting to become more popular, but thought that a more pop style was the result of "being himself". He also observed that he tended to record ballads more often than upbeat material, as he thought the former had more potential for emotional lyrics.

== Personal life ==
In 1994, Slater retired from music as he wanted to become a minister. He began attending the Church of Christ in Montgomery, Alabama, and went on to attend Abilene Christian University, from which he would graduate in 1996 with a master's degree in theology. This led to him becoming an associate minister at that church. In 1998, he became minister of Nashville's West End Church of Christ.

On July 9, 2001, Slater was arrested after security cameras at the YMCA in Brentwood, Tennessee captured footage of him breaking into patrons' cars and stealing electronics and credit cards. The charges included accusations of theft, forgery of signatures, and driving with a suspended license. A day later, he was released after posting $10,000 in bail. The Associated Press reported in 2002 that Slater pleaded guilty to 25 charges and was sentenced to four years in jail, with his sentence being suspended after 90 days. Although he was removed as minister of West End Church of Christ, he and his wife continued to attend after he was released, and the church paid for counseling for both him and his wife. He attributed his theft to a bout of stress after his family owed over $100,000 in debt. In 2006 he was convicted of credit card abuse and sentenced to six months in jail.

== Discography ==
=== Albums ===
Year	Album	US Country	Label
1988	Exchange of Hearts	33	Capitol
1989	Be with Me	—	Capitol

=== Singles ===
Year	Single	Chart Positions		Album
Year	Single	US Country	CAN Country	Album
1987	"I'm Still Your Fool"	36	—	Exchange of Hearts
1988	"The Other Guy"	30	—	Exchange of Hearts
1988	"We Were Meant to Be Lovers"	63	—	Exchange of Hearts
1989	"She Will"	65	—	Be with Me
1989	"Whatcha Gonna Do About Her"	75	57	Be with Me
