= No Looking Back (Gerard McMahon album) =

Studio album by Gerard McMahon
- Released: 1983
- Genre: Rock
- Label: Full Moon/Warner Bros.
- Producer: Gerard McMahon; Michael Ostin

Gerard McMahon chronology
Foreign Papers (1983)	No Looking Back (1983)

No Looking Back is an album by Irish-English-American singer/songwriter Gerard McMahon, released on the Full Moon/Warner Bros. label in 1983. The album was produced by Gerard McMahon and Michael Ostin. On the inside cover the album is dedicated to Christiane (his wife).

The title track from the album peaked at #85 on the Billboard Hot 100 in April 1983.

== Track listing ==
All songs written and arranged by Gerard McMahon unless otherwise noted.

1. "Count on Me"
2. "I Wouldn't Take It from You"
3. "No Looking Back"
4. "She's the Woman"
5. "Talking 'Bout Girls"
6. "(You're) Wearing My Heart Out" (Gerard McMahon, Gary Mallaber)
7. "No Sweat (It's Alright)"
8. "When She Was Mine"
9. "Nickel Charm Jack"
10. "So Many Nights"

== Personnel ==
- Gerard McMahon — producer, vocals, guitar, piano, percussion
- Michael Ostin — producer, vocals (background), percussion
- Jimmy Hunter — drums
- Bobby Gianetti — guitar (bass), vocals (background)
- Albert Campbell — synthesizer, piano, organ, percussion
- Kenny Lewis — guitar (bass), guitar
- Richie Zito — guitar
- Dawayne Bailey — guitar, vocals (background)
- Gary Mallaber — drums, synthesizer
- Michael Landau — guitar
- Stanley Sheldon — guitar (bass)
- Jon Lind — vocals (background)
- Neil Merryweather — vocals (background)
- John Massaro — vocals (background)
- Lita — vocals (background)
- Christiane — vocals (background)
- Jerry Marotta — drums
- David Boruff — saxophone
