= Stand a Little Rain =

Single by Nitty Gritty Dirt Band

from the album Twenty Years of Dirt
- B-side: "Miner's Night Out"
- Released: June 2, 1986
- Genre: Country
- Length: 3:39
- Label: Warner Bros. Nashville
- Songwriter(s): Donny Lowery, Don Schlitz
- Producer(s): Marshall Morgan, Paul Worley

Nitty Gritty Dirt Band singles chronology
"Partners, Brothers and Friends" (1986)	"Stand a Little Rain" (1986)	"Fire in the Sky" (1986)

"Stand a Little Rain" is a song written by Donny Lowery and Don Schlitz, and recorded by American country music group Nitty Gritty Dirt Band. It was released in June 1986 as the first single from their compilation album Twenty Years of Dirt. The song reached number 5 on the U.S. Billboard Hot Country Singles & Tracks chart and number 3 on the Canadian RPM Country Tracks chart.

== Critical reception ==
Kip Kirby, of Billboard magazine reviewed the song favorably, saying that the band "delivers a slow, melancholy descant on the strengthening power of adversity." He goes on to call it a "change of pace from their whimsical, 'Partners, Brothers and Friends'.

== In popular culture ==
During April 1992, the song was referenced by George H. W. Bush at a country music awards ceremony in Nashville:

"I said to them, you know, there's another one that the Nitty Ditty, Nitty City Great -- [laughter] -- that they did, and it says, "If you want to see a rainbow, you've got to stand a little rain." We've had a little rain. New Hampshire has had too much rain. A lot of families are hurting."

This mangling of the band's name was repeatedly used as an example of Bush's garbled syntax and frequent malapropisms (notably, in Dave Barry's book Dave Barry Hits Below the Beltway), which in turn helped publicize the band.

== Chart performance ==
"Stand a Little Rain" debuted at number 61 on the U.S. Billboard Hot Country Singles & Tracks for the week of June 21, 1986.

Chart (1986)	Peak position
US Hot Country Songs (Billboard)	5
Canadian RPM Country Tracks	3
