= Women & Waves =

Studio album by Jimmy Ibbotson
- Released: 2000
- Label: Unami Records Woody Creek

Jimmy Ibbotson chronology
Stories & Songs (2000)	Women & Waves (2000)	Nitty Gritty Surround (2001)

Women & Waves is the 2000 album by Jimmy Ibbotson. Ibbotson is a former member of the Nitty Gritty Dirt Band.

== Track listing ==
1. "Casa Zopilote" (J. Ibbotson)
2. "Women and Waves" (J. Ibbotson)
3. "I Was A Fool" (J. Ibbotson)
4. "No Big T'ing" (J. Ibbotson)
5. "Peppy and Libby" (J. Ibbotson)
6. "Los Perdidos" (Leonard Martinez)
7. "Pre-Pizarro" (J. Ibbotson / B. Carpenter)
8. "Arthur and Ellen" (J. Ibbotson / B. Carpenter)
9. "Drunk After Dinner" (J. Ibbotson)
10. "Cortez Sea" (J. Ibbotson / R. Johnson)
11. "Let IT Go" (J. Ibbotson)

== Personnel ==
- Jimmie Ibbotson - vocals, silver flute, mandolin, bass, guitar, flat iron mandola, synthesizer, Navaho duck flute, bass drum and box, Napaleeze reed flute, tom-toms
- Background vocals on No Big T'ing - Frank Johnson, John Carson, Steve and Zel'elle, Kallie ALbert, Eddy, Jose and Noe, Jim and Sarah, and Hoss, JOe Shepard.
- Bob Carpenter - on Pre-Pizarro he recorded the basic track.

== Production ==
- Producer - not credited on CD
