= Stories & Songs (John McEuen and Jimmy Ibbotson album) =

Studio album by John McEuen & Jimmy Ibbotson
- Released: 2000
- Label: Planetary Records
- Producer: Page Wilson with Karl Erikkson

John McEuen & Jimmy Ibbotson chronology
This Is It (1999)	Stories & Songs (2000)	Women & Waves (2000)

Stories & Songs is a 2000 album by John McEuen and Jimmy Ibbotson. Both are former members of the Nitty Gritty Dirt Band.

== Track listing ==
1. "The Richmond Song" (B. Dowe / T. McNaughton) - 4:20
2. "Grandfather's Clock" (Jimmy Ibbotson) - 1:46
3. "Campfire story" - 2:27
4. "Santo Rosa" (Jimmy Ibbotson) - 2:48
5. "Telluride story" - :19
6. "Telluride" (Jimmy Ibbotson) - 3:40
7. "Luncheonette story" - :10
8. "Luncheonette" (Jimmy Ibbotson) - 3:50
9. "Saints and Sots story" - 2:15
10. "Long Hard Road story" (Jimmy Ibbotson) - 5:02
11. "Long Hard Road" (Jimmy Ibbotson) - 5:02
12. "Ripplin Waters story" (Jimmy Ibbotson) - 5:02
13. "Ripplin Waters" (Jimmy Ibbotson) - 5:02
14. "Dance LIttle Jean story" (Jimmy Ibbotson) - 5:02
15. "Dance LIttle Jean" (Jimmy Ibbotson) - 5:02
16. "THe Mountain Whippoorwill In Richmond" (Jimmy Ibbotson) - 5:02
17. "Blue Ridge Cabin Home" (Jimmy Ibbotson) - 5:02
18. "Rainy Night In Richmond" (Jimmy Ibbotson) - 5:02

== Personnel ==
- Jimmy Ibbotson - Vocals, guitar
- John McKuen - Banjo, Guitar, Mandolin
- Jim Ratts - Vocals,
- Jim Salestron - Vocals, guitar, ukulele

with

- Harry Bruckner - Bass
- Bill Brennan - Drums
- Charlie Provenza - Mandolin
- Chuck Salestrom - Vocal
- Daniel Jones - Pedal Steel Guitar
- Ron Jones - Steel Drum
- Emelio Roberto Domingues - Hand Drums
- Salli Severing Rattbo - Vocals
- Ted Cole - Flute
- Scott Bennett - Guitar
- Kids Chorus - Jill DeLage, Barbara Henry, John BRady, and Rattbo

== Production ==
- Producer - Jim Ratts
