= Al Campbell (keyboard player) =

American musician

Al Campbell is a keyboard player. He was in the 1980s band Kid Lightning. In 1981 Kid Lightning released an album with Gerard McMahon of "Cry Little Sister" fame.

Prior to Kid Lightning, Campbell undertook work as a session musician.

In 1983, Campbell assisted producer Artie Ripp by playing keyboards on the track "Turn Around" on the remix of Billy Joel's Cold Spring Harbor album.

Campbell's name also appears amongst the credits for Jimmy Ibbotson's 1977 Nitty Gritty Ibbotson album.
