= This Is It (Jimmy Ibbotson album) =

Studio album by Jimmy Ibbotson
- Released: 1999
- Label: Unami Records

Jimmy Ibbotson chronology
| Ibbinet Companion#1.5 (1998) | This Is It (1999) | Stories & Songs (2000) |

This Is It is the 1999 album by Jimmy Ibbotson.

== Track listing ==
1. "Try Not To Cry" (Tracy McLain)
2. "Drive It Like It Is" (Tracy McLain, B. Vitany)
3. "Wheels" (Gram Parsons, Chris Hillman)
4. "Patch It Up" (T. Schuyler, W. T. Davidson)
5. "They're Tearing My Little Town Down" (R. Nielson)
6. "Winnie's Song" (Tracy McLain)
7. "Mrs. Hiss's House" (Jimmy Ibbotson)
8. "Another Daddy" (Jimmy Ibbotson)
9. "I Was a Fool" (Jimmy Ibbotson)
10. "Coming of the Roads" (B. Wheeler)

== Personnel ==
- Jimmy Ibbotson: guitar, mandolin, vocals
- Tracy McLain: vocals
