= And So It Goes (Nitty Gritty Dirt Band song) =

Single by John Denver and Nitty Gritty Dirt Band

from the album Will the Circle Be Unbroken: Volume Two
- B-side: "Amazing Grace"
- Released: May 1989
- Genre: Country Folk
- Length: 3:54
- Label: Universal
- Songwriters: Paul Overstreet; Don Schlitz
- Producers: Randy Scruggs; Nitty Gritty Dirt Band

Nitty Gritty Dirt Band singles chronology
"Turn of the Century" (1989)	"And So It Goes" (1989)	"When It's Gone" (1989)

John Denver singles chronology
"Country Girl in Paris" (1988)	"And So It Goes" (1989)	"For You" (1995)

"And So It Goes" is a song written by Paul Overstreet and Don Schlitz, and recorded by American country music artist John Denver and American music group Nitty Gritty Dirt Band. It was released in May 1989 as the second single from the Nitty Gritty Dirt Band's album Will the Circle Be Unbroken: Volume Two. The song peaked at number 14 on the Billboard Hot Country Singles chart and reached number 29 on the RPM Country Tracks chart in Canada.

== Chart performance ==
Chart (1989)	Peak position
Canada Country Singles (RPM)	29
US Hot Country Songs (Billboard)	14
