= G Tom Mac (album) =

Studio album by G Tom Mac
- Released: 2000
- Recorded: Smythe & Co. Studios, New York City; Titan Recording, Los Angeles
- Genre: Rock
- Label: Edge Artists
- Producer: G Tom Mac, Tony Berg

G Tom Mac chronology
G Tom Mac (2000)	Thou Shalt Not Fall (2007)

Professional ratings
Review scores
Source	Rating
Billboard.com	(not rated)

G Tom Mac is the debut album of Gerard McMahon's group G Tom Mac. The album was produced by G Tom Mac and Tony Berg and was released on the Edge Artists record label in 2000.

"By far one of my favourite records in a long time. G TOM MAC's got rock and pop right where it should be. Gerard McMahon's writing and vocals are stellar and adventurous."

— Roger Daltrey, The Who

== Track listing ==
All songs written by Gerard McMahon, except where noted.

1. "Half" – 3:33
2. "Shadow Walk" – 3:58 (McMahon, Gary Mallaber)
3. "Greatest Days on Earth" – 3:54
4. "Cry Little Sister" – 5:29 (McMahon, Michael Mainieri)
5. "Quiver of 19" – 3:11
6. "One Whiskey" – 4:16
7. "Happy Time" – 3:52
8. "Is Anybody Here?" – 5:07 (McMahon, Charlie Sexton)
  - (duet with Charlie Sexton)
9. "Everyday Beauty"– 3:39
10. "Life Is Too Short"– 4:28

== Personnel ==
- Charlie Sexton — guitar, bass
- Rob Ladd — drums
- Sean Pelton — drums
- Gary Mallaber — percussion, drums
- Laura Seaton-Finn — violin
- Mary Wooten — cello
- Ralph Farris — violin, viola
- Erik Friedlander — cello
- Paul Woodiel — violin
- Garo Yellin — cello
