= Baby's Got a Hold on Me =

Single by Nitty Gritty Dirt Band

from the album Hold On
- B-side: "Oleanna"
- Released: March 28, 1987
- Genre: Country
- Length: 3:04
- Label: Warner Bros. Nashville
- Songwriter(s): Jeff Hanna, Bob Carpenter, Josh Leo
- Producer(s): Josh Leo

Nitty Gritty Dirt Band singles chronology
"Fire in the Sky" (1986)	"Baby's Got a Hold on Me" (1987)	"Fishin' in the Dark" (1987)

"Baby's Got a Hold on Me" is a song written by Jeff Hanna, Bob Carpenter and Josh Leo, and recorded by American country music group Nitty Gritty Dirt Band. It was released in March 1987 as the first single from the album Hold On. The song reached number 2 on the Billboard Hot Country Singles & Tracks chart.

== Charts ==
Chart (1987)	Peak position
Canada Country Tracks (RPM)	2
US Hot Country Songs (Billboard)	2
