= Down That Road Tonight =

Single by Nitty Gritty Dirt Band

from the album Workin' Band
- B-side: "A Lot Like Me"
- Released: December 24, 1988
- Genre: Country
- Length: 3:08
- Label: Warner Bros. Nashville
- Songwriters: Jeff Hanna; Josh Leo; Wendy Waldman
- Producer: Josh Leo

Nitty Gritty Dirt Band singles chronology
"I've Been Lookin'" (1988)	"Down That Road Tonight" (1988)	"Turn of the Century" (1989)

"Down That Road Tonight" is a song written by Jeff Hanna, Josh Leo and Wendy Waldman, and recorded by American country music group Nitty Gritty Dirt Band. It was released on December 24, 1988, as the third single from the album Workin' Band, and reached No. 6 on the Billboard Hot Country Songs chart.

== Chart performance ==
Chart (1988–1989)	Peak position
US Hot Country Songs (Billboard)	6

=== Year-end charts ===
Chart (1989)	Position
Canada Country Tracks (RPM)	78
US Country Songs (Billboard)	92
