= Gerard (album) =

Studio album by Gerard
- Released: 1976
- Recorded: Caribou Ranch, Colorado
- Genre: Rock
- Label: Caribou Records
- Producer: James William Guercio

Gerard chronology
Gerard (1976)	Row (1976)

Gerard is an album by the Colorado band Gerard, led by singer/songwriter Gerard McMahon. It was recorded at Caribou Ranch in Colorado and was released in 1976. The album was produced by James William Guercio, who also produced Chicago's early albums.

== Track listing ==
1. "Hello Operator"
2. "Lucky Ol' Me"
3. "Fool Like Me"
4. "Dame"
5. "Silver Strings"
6. "Who's Your Daddy-O?"
7. "Remember Your Promises"
8. "Good Yankee Boy"
9. "Another Way to Say"
10. "We Stand United"

== Personnel ==
- Gerard McMahon – vocals, piano, synthesizer, organ
- Ross Salomone – drums
- Steve Sykes – guitar, percussion
- Hilliard Wilson – guitar (bass)
- Lana Wilson – vocals (background)
- Al Campbell – synthesizer, organ, keyboards, percussion
- Richard Bolden – saxophone
- Shelley Gray – vocals (background)
- Tom Howard – trumpet, flugelhorn
- Stan Rogers – trombone
