= I Love Only You =

Single by Nitty Gritty Dirt Band

from the album Plain Dirt Fashion
- B-side: "Face on the Cutting Room Floor"
- Released: September 17, 1984
- Genre: Country
- Length: 3:30
- Label: Warner Bros. Nashville
- Songwriter(s): Dave Loggins, Don Schlitz
- Producer(s): Marshall Morgan, Paul Worley

Nitty Gritty Dirt Band singles chronology
"Long Hard Road (The Sharecropper's Dream)" (1984)	"I Love Only You" (1984)	"High Horse" (1985)

"I Love Only You" is a song written by Dave Loggins and Don Schlitz, and recorded by American country music group Nitty Gritty Dirt Band. It was released in September 1984 as the second single from the album Plain Dirt Fashion. The song reached number 3 on the Billboard Hot Country Singles & Tracks chart.

== Chart performance ==
Chart (1984)	Peak position
US Hot Country Songs (Billboard)	3
Canadian RPM Country Tracks	2
