= Nitty Gritty Surround =

Studio album by John McEuen & Jimmy Ibbotson
- Released: 2001
- Genre: Country/Country rock/Folk rock/Bluegrass
- Label: AIX Records
- Producer: Mark Waldrep and John McEuen

John McEuen & Jimmy Ibbotson chronology
Women & Waves (2000)	Nitty Gritty Surround (2001)	Hummingbirds of the Americas (2001)

Nitty Gritty Surround is the 2001 DVD-Video and DVD-Audio release by John McEuen & Jimmy Ibbotson. It consists of a live in studio recording. It was recorded November 17, 2000 at the Historic Fox Theater, Hanford, California.

Both are former members of the Nitty Gritty Dirt Band.

The DVD-Video can be viewed with an "Audience mix" or the "Stage" mix. The DVD-Audio side is "Stage" Mix. The "Stage" mix surrounds you like you are on stage with the musicians.

The DVD cover credits John McEuen & Jimmy Ibbotson featuring Special Appearance by Jennifer Warnes. The DVD main menu, however, credits the DVD to John McEuen and the String Wizards Featuring Special Appearance BY Jennifer Warnes and Jimmy Ibbotson.

== Track listing ==
1. "Miner's Night Out" (John McEuen) - 3:19
2. "Darcy Farrow" (Tom Campbell & Steve Gillette) - 4:08 - Lead vocal Jimmy, harmony vocal Jennifer
3. "Moonlight Dancing" (John McEuen) - 3:54
4. "Acoustic Traveler" (John McEuen) - 4:08
5. "Somewhere Somebody" (John McEuen) - 2:29 - Vocals Jennifer
6. "Too Late Love Comes To Me" (Gronenthal / McNally / Kastner) - 4:36 - Vocal Jennifer
7. "Shady Grove" (Gronenthal / McNally / Kastner) - 3:15 - Vocals Jonathan
8. "The Oak And The Laurel" (Laurie Lewis) - 4:59 - Vocals - Laurie
9. "Swing To Bop" (Charles Christian) - 5:25
10. "It's Morning" (Jimmy Ibbotson) - 3:43 - Vocals Jimmy
11. "Blue Days, Sleepless Nights" (Laurie Lewis) - 5:02 - Vocals Laurie

== Personnel ==
- John McEuen - Banjo, guitar, mandolin
- Jimmie Ibbotson - Vocals, bass, mandolin, guitar, percussion
- Jennifer Warnes - Vocals
- Laurie Lewis - Guitar, vocals
- Tom Rozum - Mandolin, vocals
- Jonathon McEuen - Guitar, vocals
- Matt Cartsonis - Harmony vocals, mandolin, dulcimer
- Tom Corbett - Mandolin
- Rick Cunha - Guitar, ukulele, vocals
- Phil Salazar - Fiddle
- Randy Tico - Acoustic bass
- Jim Christie - Drums, percussion

== Production ==
- Producer - Mark Waldrep and John McEuen
