= Home Again in My Heart =

Single by Nitty Gritty Dirt Band

from the album Partners, Brothers and Friends
- B-side: "Telluride"
- Released: October 7, 1985
- Genre: Country
- Length: 3:33
- Label: Warner Bros. Nashville
- Songwriter(s): Josh Leo, Wendy Waldman
- Producer(s): Marshall Morgan; Paul Worley

Nitty Gritty Dirt Band singles chronology
"Modern Day Romance" (1985)	"Home Again in My Heart" (1985)	"Partners, Brothers and Friends" (1986)

"Home Again in My Heart" is a song written by Josh Leo and Wendy Waldman, and recorded by American country music group Nitty Gritty Dirt Band. It was released in October 1985 as the second single from their album Partners, Brothers and Friends. The song reached number 3 on the Billboard Hot Country Singles chart in January 1986 and number 1 on the RPM Country Tracks chart in Canada.

== Chart performance ==
Chart (1985–1986)	Peak position
US Hot Country Songs (Billboard)	3
Canadian RPM Country Tracks	1
