= Modern Day Romance =

1985 single by Nitty Gritty Dirt Band

Single by Nitty Gritty Dirt Band

from the album Partners, Brothers and Friends
- B-side: "Queen of the Road"
- Released: June 3, 1985
- Genre: Country
- Length: 3:32
- Label: Warner Bros. Nashville
- Songwriter(s): Kix Brooks; Dan Tyler
- Producer(s): Paul Worley; Marshall Morgan

Nitty Gritty Dirt Band singles chronology
"High Horse" (1985)	"Modern Day Romance" (1985)	"Home Again in My Heart" (1985)

"Modern Day Romance" is a song written by Kix Brooks and Dan Tyler and recorded by American country music group Nitty Gritty Dirt Band. It was released in June 1985 as the lead single from the album Partners, Brothers and Friends. The song was The Nitty Gritty Dirt Band's second number one on the country chart. The single went to number one for one week and spent a total of fifteen weeks on the country chart.

== Music video ==
The music video was directed by Gary Amelon.

== Charts ==
=== Weekly charts ===
Chart (1985)	Peak position
US Hot Country Songs (Billboard)	1
Canadian RPM Country Tracks	2

=== Year-end charts ===
Chart (1985)	Position
US Hot Country Songs (Billboard)	8
