= Gerard McMahon =

British musician

- Also known as: Gerard McMann; G Tom Mac; G
- Born: Gerard Thomas McMahon
- Origin: Birmingham, West Midlands, England
- Genres: Rock; pop; soundtrack
- Occupations: Musician; singer-songwriter; producer
- Instruments: Vocals; guitar; bass; keyboards
- Years active: 1971–present
- Label: Edge Artists
- Website: gtommac.com

Gerard Thomas McMahon, also known as Gerard McMann and G Tom Mac, is an English singer-songwriter, multi-instrumentalist and producer who specialises in creating music for films and TV. His gothic rock anthem "Cry Little Sister" was recorded in 1987 for the soundtrack album of the cult horror film The Lost Boys.

== Early years ==
Gerard McMahon emigrated with his family from England to America when he was eleven. Initially moving to New York City, the McMahons moved again a few years later, eventually settling in Wichita, Kansas. When McMahon, who lists amongst his musical influences Liam Mullen, John Lennon, Stevie Wonder and Stravinsky, was sixteen, he and his band, The Strangers, recorded a single ("Don't Ever Leave Me") before disbanding.

After The Strangers disbanded, McMahon moved to Boulder, Colorado and sat in on music classes at the university. In 1971 he moved to New York City to pursue a performing career. His first gigs were playing bass and guitar in R&B bands in Harlem. Being a versatile multi-instrumentalist, McMahon was soon receiving additional offers of work as a session musician. It was in this capacity that he provided backing vocals at Electric Lady Studios in New York, on the last Zephyr album to feature Tommy Bolin, Going Back to Colorado.

In addition to gigging and studio session work, McMahon also became involved around this time in creating music for TV commercials. He also created a number of scores for Public Broadcasting Service projects.

McMahon spent 1972 living in Los Angeles, gaining further experience in studio and production work. Soon he was to be found playing bass with Jackson Browne's touring band. It wasn't too long, however, before McMahon concluded that it would be more rewarding to promote his own solo career, and he went back to Colorado.

After returning to Boulder, McMahon got together with a group of ten studio musicians and fronted an act called Gerard.

"After attending a concert one evening that showcased Tommy Bolin, Chicago producer Jim Guercio walked out mesmerized by Gerard's opening set."

— G.Brown, author, Colorado Rocks!: A Half-Century of Music in Colorado

Guercio offered the band a deal to record an album at his newly built Caribou Ranch. The resultant album, produced by Guercio himself, was Gerard. It was released in 1976 on Guercio's Caribou Records label. There did, however, seem to be one downside to this union, seemingly echoed in McMahon's frustration with the music press at that time, in so far as every review of Gerard's album, an album for which he had written twelve original songs, compared his music to that of Chicago's. Although the album did well, it never broke nationally. The lead-off single, "Hello Operator" (b/w "Who's Your Daddy-O?"), failed to hit Billboard's Hot 100 chart, getting as high as No. 109 on the Bubbling Under Hot 100 chart. The second single, "Good Yankee Boy," was released as a promo-only single, and garnered only moderate radio airplay in 1976. A second Gerard album, Row, was to follow before the group disbanded, after which McMahon decided to return to Los Angeles.

The next three years saw McMahon again partaking in a number of different musical projects and continuing to lend his services as a session musician. One of the projects he undertook at that time was to play keyboards on ex-Nitty Gritty Dirt Band's Jimmy Ibbotson's 1977 Nitty Gritty Ibbotson album. He is also listed amongst the credits for Max Gronenthal's 1979 album Whistling in the Dark.

== 1980 – 1989 ==
McMahon's 1979 song "Is That You?" was the first track on Kiss' Unmasked (1980) and was also released as a single and played live by Kiss in 1980. Producer Vini Poncia heard the demo, with Gary Mallaber on drums and Kenny Lee Lewis on bass, and presented it to Kiss, who loved the song. In 1988, McMahon and Paul Stanley met and wrote 3-4 songs intended for Robert Plant, with whom McMahon worked at the time.

Encouraged by Billy Joel's former manager Irwin Mazur, in 1980 McMahon decided to promote his own recording career. He assembled a group called Kid Lightning – Gary Mallaber, John Massaro, Kenny Lewis and two of the musicians he had engaged for Gerard, guitarist Steve Sykes and keyboard player Al Campbell – and recorded the album Blue Rue. After the album was completed, McMahon's band was dropped from Columbia Records.

Already experienced in major TV commercials, McMahon began film work. He wrote and recorded seven songs for producer Jerry Bruckheimer's film Defiance.

"Gerard's a triple threat, he's a writer, he's a producer and he's a performer...it's very difficult to find someone to deliver all that"

— Nigel Sinclair, Producer – Terminator 3: Rise of the Machines

During the '80s, McMahon wrote songs for films such as Fast Times at Ridgemont High, Spring Break, All the Right Moves, The Lonely Guy, Grandview, U.S.A. and Hardbodies.

McMahon's next album, No Looking Back, was released by Warner Bros. in 1983, after which McMahon signed with the Atlantic Records label and in 1986 released Foreign Papers.

McMahon scored a hit in 1986 with "Cry Little Sister."

== G TOM MAC ==
McMahon recorded another album in 2000 for Edge Artists. To record and promote the album, McMahon formed a new band, G TOM MAC, with bassist, songwriter and co-producer Anthony Silver. McMahon and Silver added Rodney "Cortada" Alejandro on keyboards, drummer Rob Ladd (from the band The Pressure Boys), Willy Aron (lead guitar) and Brie Darling (from the band Boxing Gandhis) on backing vocals and percussion for live performances.

In 2004 McMahon wrote the music and Eddie Kislinger wrote the lyrics for "Wicked Town," "Drop Dead Pretty," and "Was It Magic" for Witchblade The Music, an Edge Artists soundtrack of songs from or inspired by the Witchblade TV series. McMahon and Kislinger are credited as Executive Producers. In 2012 The CW used "Wicked Town" in its trailer promoting the Arrow TV series.

== Song list (film and television) ==
All the following songs are written and performed by Gerard McMahon unless otherwise stated:

Year	Film/TV Show	Song Information	Co writer	Performed by
1980	Defiance	"Bad Times"		Tavares
1980	Defiance	"Un Tipo Malo" '"Hot Town Streets" '"Take It Down The Middle" '"Double Shot" '"I Will Stay With You" '"Let The Light Shine in the Morning"		Gerard McMahon
1982	Fast Times at Ridgemont High	"The Look in Your Eyes"		Gerard McMahon
1983	Spring Break	"One of These Days"		Gerard McMahon
1983	All the Right Moves	"Mr. Popularity"		Winston Ford
1984	The Lonely Guy	"Oughta Know Love By Now"		Winston Ford
1984	The Lonely Guy	"Don't Call Me Lonely"		Gerard McMahon
1984	Hardbodies	"Smile for the Camera" "Barbados Rita" "Hello, Hello"		Gerard McMahon
1984	Grandview, USA	"Face The Odds"		Gerard McMahon
1987	The Lost Boys	"Cry Little Sister (Theme From The Lost Boys)"	Michael Mainieri	Gerard McMann
1995	Kicking and Screaming	"In a Twilight Moment"		Phoebe Snow
1995	Born To Be Wild	"One World for Us"		Gerard McMahon
1996	Vampirella	"Bleed for Me"		Roger Daltrey
1996	No Way Home	"Ghost in the Heart"		Gerard McMahon
1997	Chasing Amy	"My Stomp, My Beat"		Vicki Sue Robinson
1997	Fame L.A.	"You Don't Reject Me"	Eddie Kislinger	Stephanie Dicker
1997	Fame L.A.	"Wake Up the House"	Vonda Shepard	Brent Fraser
1998	The Players Club	"Money Can't Buy You Love"	Frank Fitzpatrick	K-Ci & JoJo
1998	Implicated	"If I Have You"		Jennifer Gross
2001	Witchblade Season 1	"Child Of Mine" (Episode 2 "Conundrum")	Roger Daltrey	Roger Daltrey feat. Gerard McMahon
2001	Witchblade Season 1	"Cry Little Sister" (remix) (Episode 11 "Transcendence")	Michael Mainieri	G TOM MAC
2001	Witchblade Season 1	"Child Of Mine" (Episode 11 "Transcendence")	Roger Daltrey	Roger Daltrey feat. Gerard McMahon
2002	Witchblade Season 2	"Cry Little Sister" (Episode 6 "Nailed")	Michael Mainieri	Gerard McMann
2002	Witchblade Season 2	"Child Of Mine" (remix) (Episode 8 "Hierophant")	Roger Daltrey	Roger Daltrey feat. G Tom Mac
2002	The Banger Sisters	"Child Of Mine"	Roger Daltrey	Roger Daltrey feat. G Tom Mac
2002	The Shield Season 1	"Sugar Fine" (Episode 7 "Pay in Pain")		Gerard McMahon
2003	From Justin to Kelly	"The Game"	John Van Eps	Gabriellis Kaye
2003	As the World Turns	"Once Betrayed" (Episode broadcast 13 May 2003)		G TOM MAC
2003	The Skulls III	"That's What The Thrill Really Is (instrumental version)"		G TOM MAC
2003	The Skulls III	"That's What The Thrill Really Is" (instrumental version)		Jennifer Grais
2003	Sunset Junction (A Documentary Film)	"Sunset Junction"		G TOM MAC
2005	Scrubs Season 4	"Half" (Episode 25 "My Changing Ways")		G TOM MAC
2006	I-See-You.Com	"I See You"		G TOM MAC

== Further works ==
McMahon has also contributed to all the following films and TV shows:

- Rude Awakening (1989) (Music Arranger)
- "Greatest Days on Earth" Party of Five – song
- "Quiver of 19" Felicity – song
- "Happy Time" Jack & Jill – song
- Charmed
- Dawson's Creek
- Ed
- Baywatch
- Crossing Jordan
- My So-Called Life
- Providence
- Passions
- The $treet
- Countdown
- Buffy The Vampire Slayer
- The Immortal
- Pig Killer
