= Long Hard Road (The Sharecropper's Dream) =

Single by Nitty Gritty Dirt Band

from the album Plain Dirt Fashion
- B-side: "Video Tape"
- Released: May 21, 1984
- Recorded: December 1983
- Genre: Country
- Length: 3:20
- Label: Warner Bros. Nashville
- Songwriter(s): Rodney Crowell
- Producer(s): Paul Worley

Nitty Gritty Dirt Band singles chronology
"Dance Little Jean" (1983)	"Long Hard Road (The Sharecropper's Dream)" (1984)	"I Love Only You" (1984)

"Long Hard Road (The Sharecropper's Dream)" is a song written by Rodney Crowell and recorded by American country music band Nitty Gritty Dirt Band. It was released in May 1984 as the lead single from the album, Plain Dirt Fashion. The song was the Nitty Gritty Dirt Band's first (of three) No. 1 songs on the Billboard Hot Country Singles chart.

== Content ==
The song is told through the eyes of the son of a sharecropper, who along with his family was forced to work long, hard hours in a cotton field for little pay. Now a grown man, the main protagonist's memories of childhood are mainly pleasant, such as singing songs along with his grandmother's radio, hearing his mother read from the Bible and always having food to eat. However, his dreams take him to a better life:

"Someday I was dreamin' that a song that I was singin'
"Takes me down the road to where I want to go.
"Now I know, it's a long hard road."

Years later, the protagonist has now apparently made it big in his chosen field (perhaps in music, as implied by the lyrics), and has the opportunity to reflect on his childhood. Here, he realizes he didn't have it so bad in the cotton fields and having the warmth and security of his family close by. As he bemoans missing things that marked his childhood — watching lightning bugs dance in the rain, listening to the raindrops beat on the tin roof of his log cabin home and hearing his parents make music with makeshift instruments — he is resigned to living out his dream, which he is determined to make come true.

== Charts ==
=== Weekly charts ===
Chart (1984)	Peak position
US Hot Country Songs (Billboard)	1
Canadian RPM Country Tracks	2

=== Year-end charts ===
Chart (1984)	Position
US Hot Country Songs (Billboard)	12
