= Workin' Man (Nowhere to Go) =

Single by Nitty Gritty Dirt Band

from the album Workin' Band
- B-side: "Brass Sky"
- Released: April 1988
- Genre: Country
- Length: 3:52
- Label: Warner Bros. Nashville
- Songwriter(s): Jimmie Fadden
- Producer(s): Josh Leo

Nitty Gritty Dirt Band singles chronology
"Oh What a Love" (1987)	"Workin' Man (Nowhere to Go)" (1988)	"I've Been Lookin'" (1988)

"Workin' Man (Nowhere to Go)" is a song written by Jimmie Fadden, and recorded by American country music group Nitty Gritty Dirt Band. The song was released in April 1988 as the lead single from the album Workin' Band. The song reached number 4 on the Billboard Hot Country Singles & Tracks chart.

== Charts ==
=== Weekly charts ===
Chart (1988)	Peak position
US Hot Country Songs (Billboard)	4
Canadian RPM Country Tracks	6

=== Year-end charts ===
Chart (1988)	Position
US Hot Country Songs (Billboard)	66
