= Foreign Papers =

Studio album by Gerard McMann
- Released: 1986
- Genre: Rock
- Label: Atco Records
- Producer: Gerard McMann; Frank Filipetti; Joe Filipetti

Gerard McMann chronology
No Looking Back (1983)	Foreign Papers (1986)

Foreign Papers is an album by English singer/songwriter Gerard McMann (a.k.a. Gerard McMahon), released on the Atco Records label in 1986. The album was produced by Gerard McMann, Frank Filipetti and Joe Filipetti.

== Track listing ==
1. "Everytime I See You "
2. "Stuff It "
3. "True to You"
4. "Ain't Too Many More Like You"
5. "Message (I'm With You)"
6. "All the Way"
7. "Lovers of a Tender Fire"
8. "Dance Like a Warrior"
9. "Check Out"

== Personnel ==
- Gerard McMann — producer, synthesizer, vocals, guitar
- Scott Martin — synthesizer, programming
- John Massaro — backing vocals
- Andy Newmark — drums
- James Pankow — horn
- Walter Parazaider — horn
- Caz Silver — vocals (background)
- Stuart Ziff — rhythm guitar
- Philip Bailey — vocals (background)
- Jimmy Bralower — drums
- Michael Camacho — vocals (background)
- Mare Cohn — vocals (background)
- Mark Egan — bass
- Julie Eigenberg — vocals (background)
- Steve Ferrone — drums
- Frank Filipetti — producer
- Joe Filipetti — producer
- Bob Gianetti — vocals (background)
- Lani Groves — vocals (background)
- Peter Hewlitt — vocals (background)
- Danny Keogh — bass
- Robert Lamm — vocals (background)
- Michael Landau — guitar
- Tony Levin — bass
- Lee Loughnane — horn
- David Lubolt — synthesizer
- Jimmy Maelen — percussion
- Gary Mallaber — vocals (background)
- Bruce Martin — vocals (background)
