= Blue Rue =

Studio album by Gerard McMahon & Kid Lightning
- Released: January 1981
- Genre: Rock
- Label: ARC/Columbia
- Producer: Gerard McMahon, Kid Lightning

Blue Rue is an album by singer/songwriter Gerard McMahon and Kid Lightning. It was released on the ARC/Columbia label in January 1981 as NJC 36986 (LP) and NCT 36986 (cassette). It was distributed internationally by CBS as catalog no. 84880 (LP).

== Background ==
In 1978 McMahon was chosen by Jerry Bruckheimer to provide the original songs (not the score) for the movie Defiance and when the movie was in post-production there was speculation that the project had potential for a soundtrack album. When the movie premiered in February 1980 – its release was delayed to avoid possible competition with The Warriors – the poster and some ads had the text “Original songs by Gerard McMahon”. One of the songs McMahon wrote for the movie, “Bad Times”, was recorded by Tavares and became a minor hit peaking at number 47 on the Billboard Hot 100 and number 64 on Cashbox Top 100 Singles in late February, 1980, and managed a peak of number 61 on the Record World Singles chart in early March. McMahon also managed to get the song “Is That You” recorded by Kiss for their 1980 album Unmasked. These relative successes led to a publishing deal with the newly formed Amazin’ Music run by former Billy Joel manager Irwin Mazur and, shortly thereafter, a record deal with ARC.

== Reception ==
Critical reception of the album was varied. Some saw “the most intense, exceptional album of mainstream rock of the year”, one which contained “a hot string of hits”, and featured the “mostt [sic.] ambitious writing heard this year from anybody”. Others called it “a blustering, hollow debut […] a formula effort that fails to find the spark to catch fire”, and a syndicated review from Rolling Stone claimed that the album showcased an “utter lack of emotion”. Most reviewers mentioned a stylistic debt to Bruce Springsteen and/or Tom Petty. Both Billboard and Cashbox noted that the material on the album should be accessible to both Top 40 and AOR radio formats, and critic Robert Hilburn included the album track “Town Girls” on his Alternative Top 10. Despite this the album managed only minor airplay and several radio appearances in early April, 1981, failed to improve that. The album failed to chart on the Billboard Top 200.

== Track listing ==
1. "Taxi (Nightdriver)"
2. "Night Woman"
3. "Gone Tomorrow"
4. "Town Girls"
5. "All I Really Need"
6. "You Know Me Better Than I Do"
7. "Run Into Your Shadow"
8. "One More Goodbye"
9. "Blind Love"
10. "What've You Gotta Lose"

== Personnel ==
- Gerard McMahon – lead vocals, guitar, keyboards
- Gary Mallaber – drums, percussion, backing vocals
- John Massaro – guitar, keyboards, harmonica, backing vocals
- Al Campbell – keyboards, synthesizer
- Steve Sykes – lead guitar, guitar synthesizer
- Kenny Lewis – bass, backing vocals

== Production ==
- Producer – Gerard McMahon, Kid Lightning
- Chief Engineer – Joel Soifer
- Engineer – Bob Deeb
