= Wild Jimbos =

Studio album by Wild Jimbos
- Released: 1991
- Genre: Country/Country rock/Folk rock/Bluegrass
- Label: MCA
- Producer: in a Jimbo way by Sam Bush

Wild Jimbos chronology
Wild Jimbos (1991)	Wild Jimbos Two (1993)

Wild Jimbos is the 1991 album by Wild Jimbos. Wild Jimbos is Jim Salestrom, Jimmy Ibbotson and Jim Ratts. Salestrom was a member of Dolly Parton's band. Ibbotson was a member of the Nitty Gritty Dirt Band, as a songwriter, singer, and multi-instrumentalist. Ratts is a member of Runaway Express.

The song, "Sarah in the Summer," was originally released as "Sara" on Ibbotson's first solo album Nitty Gritty Ibbotson in 1977. It was also recorded again as "Sarah in the Summer" by Ibbotson during his Nitty Gritty Dirt Band tenure, specifically on their 1994 album, Acoustic.

== Track listing ==
All tracks composed by Jimmy Ibbotson; except where noted.

1. "Howlin' at the Moon" (Jim Ratts, John McEuen) - 3:09
2. "Sarah in the Summer" - 3:07
3. "Train in the Canyon" (Jimmy Ibbotson, Joe Henry) - 4:48
4. "Let's Talk Dirty in Hawaiian" (Fred Koller, John Prine) - 3:08
5. "Tilt a World" (Jim Ratts) - 2:49
6. "My New Wife" - 2:44
7. "Unconditional Love" (Jimmy Salestrom) - 3:25
8. "Bolongo Bay" - 3:57
9. "Where The Light Comes From" (Don Schlitz, Thom Schuyler) - 3:34
10. "You and Me Kid" - 3:05

== Personnel ==
- Jim Salestrom (Salebo) - Vocals, guitars, ukulele, bird calls
- Jimmy Ibbotson (Ibbo)- Vocals, drums, guitar, bass
- Jim Ratts (Rattbo) - Vocals, bass

with

- Sam Bush (Sambo) - Fiddle, Mandolin, Background vocals, acoustic guitars, bass
- Macebo - Hawaiian lap steel guitar (very Jimboish) on "Let's talk Dirty".

== Production ==
- Producer - in a Jimbo way by Sam Bush
