= Wild Jimbos Two =

Studio album by Wild Jimbos
- Released: 1993
- Genre: Country/Country rock/Folk rock/Bluegrass
- Label: Resounding Records
- Producer: Jm Ratts

Wild Jimbos chronology
Wild Jimbos (1991)	Wild Jimbos Two (1993)

Wild Jimbos Two is the 1993 album by Wild Jimbos. Wild Jimbos is Jim Salestrom, Jimmy Ibbotson and Jim Ratts. Jim Salestrom was at that time a member of Dolly Parton's band. Jimmy Ibbotson was at the time a member of the Nitty Gritty Dirt Band. He is notable for writing, singing and playing a variety of instruments on charting songs released by the Nitty Gritty Dirt Band. Jim Ratts is a member of Runaway Express.

== Track listing ==
All tracks composed by Jimmy Ibbotson; except where noted.

1. "Rivers of Babylon" (Brent Dowe, Trevor McNaughton) - 1:50
2. "It's Morning" - 3:15
3. "No Big Thing" (Jimmy Ibbotson, Joe Henry) - 3:02
4. "We Can't Get Together" - 3:50
5. "Kelly Begs" - 2:54
6. "Julianna" - 4:03
7. "Wildwood" - 3:11
8. "Firelines" - 4:42
9. "The Pepperoni Song" - 2:30
10. "Warrior's Dream" - 4:38

== Personnel ==
- Jimmy Ibbotson - vocals, guitar
- Jim Ratts - vocals
- Jim Salestron - vocals, guitar, ukulele

with

- Harry Bruckner - bass
- Bill Brennan - drums
- Charlie Provenza - mandolin
- Chuck Salestrom - vocals
- Daniel Jones - pedal steel guitar
- Ron Jones - steel drum
- Emelio Roberto Domingues - hand drums
- Salli Severing Rattbo - vocals
- Ted Cole - flute
- Scott Bennett - guitar
- Jill DeLage, Barbara Henry, John Brady, and Rattbo - kids chorus

== Production ==
- Producer - Jim Ratts
