= We Were Meant to Be Lovers =

Single by Jim Photoglo

from the album Photoglo
- B-side: "Beg, Borrow or Steal"
- Released: 1980
- Genre: Soft rock
- Length: 3:35
- Label: 20th Century Fox
- Songwriters: Brian Neary, Jim Photoglo
- Producer: Brian Francis Neary

Jim Photoglo singles chronology
"We Were Meant to Be Lovers" (1980)	"When Love Is Gone" (1980)

"We Were Meant to Be Lovers" is the debut single by Jim Photoglo, released in 1980 from his debut album, Photoglo. It reached No. 31 on the Billboard Hot 100, and No. 14 on the Adult Contemporary chart.

Cover versions have been recorded by Rita Remington in 1980 and David Slater in 1988. Slater's version reached No. 63 on the Billboard Country chart.
