= Jim Photoglo =

American singer-songwriter

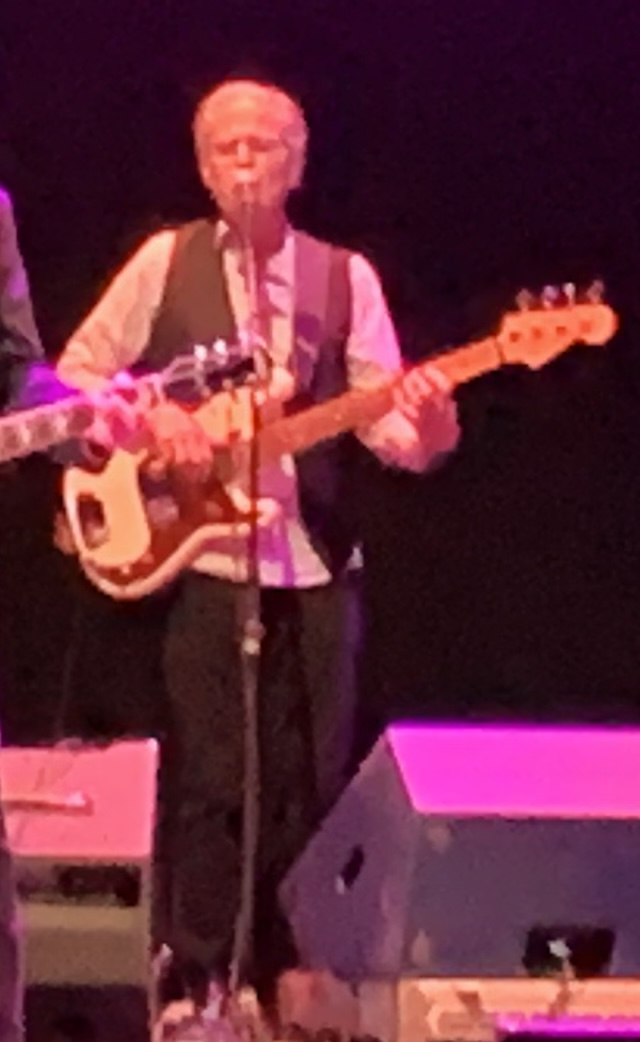
- Jim Photoglo playing with Nitty Gritty Dirt Band in 2024.

Background information
- Origin: Inglewood, California, U.S.
- Genres: Soft rock; country
- Occupations: Musician; singer-songwriter
- Instruments: Vocals; bass guitar; acoustic guitar
- Years active: 1980–present
- Labels: 20th Century Fox, Casablanca
- Member of: Nitty Gritty Dirt Band
- Formerly of: Run C&W
- Website: jimphotoglo.com

James G. Photoglo (born April 10, 1951) is an American soft rock singer and songwriter from Inglewood, California. He released two charting albums in the early 1980s and had two hit singles, "We Were Meant to Be Lovers" (No. 31, 1980) and "Fool in Love with You" (No. 25, 1981). He has also performed simply as Photoglo.

After his career as a pop artist, he became a successful country music songwriter in Nashville. He wrote songs for Garth Brooks, Faith Hill, the Everly Brothers, Dusty Springfield, Lee Roy Parnell, Patty Loveless, Highway 101, the Oak Ridge Boys, Pam Tillis, Tanya Tucker, Travis Tritt, Neal McCoy, John Anderson, and Kathy Mattea. Four recordings made the top ten of Billboard's country chart, and two went to No. 1: "Fishin' in the Dark" by the Nitty Gritty Dirt Band and "Hometown Honeymoon" by Alabama. In addition, his song "She Loves Me (The Best That I Can Be)" was covered by pop/R&B singer James Ingram. In the Philippines, his single "Will of the Wind" became a popular standard since its release in 1995; singer Jamie Rivera and actress Jolina Magdangal recorded covers of the song.

He released solo albums again in the 1990s and 2000s. Photoglo was also one of four members of a short-lived novelty country band called Run C&W, which recorded two albums for MCA between 1993 and 1995. He had a long-running association with Dan Fogelberg, serving as bass player and backup vocalist in Fogelberg's touring band for much of the 1980s and 1990s.

His most recent folk album, Halls of My Heart, was released in July 2014. It is the first album on which Photoglo wrote nearly all of its songs single-handedly.

Since 2016, Photoglo has been touring as a sideman with the Nitty Gritty Dirt Band, playing bass guitar and acoustic guitar, as well as adding background vocals.

== Discography ==
=== Albums ===
- 1980 – Photoglo (U.S. #194)
- 1981 – Fool in Love with You (U.S. #119)
- 1983 – The Thin Man
- 1993 – Passage
- 1995 – Pure Love
- 2000 – Fly Straight Home
- 2005 – Sparks in the Radio
- 2009 – Is It Me?
- 2014 – Halls of My Heart

=== Singles ===
- 1980 – "We Were Meant to Be Lovers" - U.S. Billboard #31, U.S. AC #14
- 1980 – "When Love Is Gone" - U.S. AC #44
- 1981 – "Fool in Love with You" - U.S. Billboard #25, U.S. AC #12, Cash Box #23; CAN AC #11
- 1981 – "More to Love" - U.S. AC #36
- 1981 – "Don't Play Another Sad Song"
- 1981 – "Tonight Will Last Forever"
- 1983 – "I Think We're Alone Now"
- 1983 – "Don't Say Goodnight"
- 1995 – "Will of the Wind"
- 1995 – "Pure Love"
- 2000 – "Fly Straight Home"
- 2005 – "Sparks in the Radio"
- 2009 – "Is It Me"
- 2014 – "Halls of My Heart"
