= Dan Tyler =

American songwriter (born 1950)

- Born: 1950; McComb, Mississippi, U.S.
- Education: University of Mississippi, Bach. of English, Law
- Children: 2
- Website: www.dantyler.net

Daniel Eugene Tyler (born 1950) is an American songwriter. Among his best known songs are "Bobbie Sue" (co-written with his wife, Adele), "Modern Day Romance", "Twenty Years Ago", "Somebody's Doin' Me Right", and "The Light In Your Eyes".

== About ==
Tyler was born and raised in McComb, Mississippi. His father worked in newspapers and radio, and his mother was an English teacher. He studied law at the University of Mississippi and clerked in Mississippi, following which he and his wife moved to Nashville to write songs, and where he practiced entertainment law. His son, William Tyler, is a prominent guitarist and composer.

== Career ==
His songs have been recorded by, among others, Eddy Arnold, The Oak Ridge Boys, Bobby Blue Bland, Keith Whitley, Candi Staton, Kenny Rogers, Agnetha Fältskog, LeAnn Rimes, B.J. Thomas, The Nitty Gritty Dirt Band, Dr. Hook, Eddie Rabbitt, the Cox Family, S-K-O, and Paul Overstreet.

In 1997, he placed number 19 on Billboard magazine's year-end list of Hot Country Singles Songwriters.

He wrote the 1996 novel Music City Confidential.

== Songs ==
See Category: Songs written by Dan Tyler
