= Jimmy Ibbotson =

American musician (born 1947)

- Born: James Arvey Ibbotson; January 21, 1947 (age 79) Philadelphia, Pennsylvania, U.S.
- Genres: Country, rock
- Occupations: Singer, songwriter, musician
- Instruments: Vocals, guitar, mandolin, bass, keyboards, drums, percussion
- Years active: 1966–present
- Label: Unami Records
- Formerly of: Nitty Gritty Dirt Band

James Arvey Ibbotson (born January 21, 1947) is an American musician who is best known as a longtime member of the Nitty Gritty Dirt Band. He has also released albums as a solo artist, as a member of the Wild Jimbos, and with John McEuen.

== Career ==
Ibbotson was a member of the Evergreen Blueshoes in 1969, alongside future Byrds musician Skip Battin. After spending a number of years with the Nitty Gritty Dirt Band, as well as being a solo artist, Ibbotson joined the Wild Jimbos in the early 1990s.

In 1998 Ibbotson released Ibbinet Companion#1.5. He was writing a weekly column for his website, telling stories about his adventures on the road, living in Colorado, trying to stop smoking, and general philosophies on life. He wanted to release the songs that he wrote around that time as an audio companion to his Internet stories. He sang and played guitar and mandolin. One year later, Ibbotson released This Is It with Tracy McLain. He wrote three songs on this album, "Mrs. Hiss's House", "Another Daddy", and "I Was a Fool".

In May 2009, the Highland Ranch Herald reported Ibbotson was working on new material and performing locally.

== Discography ==
=== Albums ===
Year	Album	Artist	Label
1977	Nitty Gritty Ibbotson	Jimmy Ibbotson	First American
1991	Wild Jimbos	Wild Jimbos	MCA Records
1993	Wild Jimbos Two	Wild Jimbos	Resounding Records
1998	Ibbinet Companion#1.5	Jimmy Ibbotson	Unami Records
1999	This Is It	Jimmy Ibbotson	Unami Records
2000	Stories & Songs	John McEuen and Jimmy Ibbotson	Planetary Records
2000	Women & Waves	Jimmy Ibbotson	Unami Records Woody Creek
2001	Nitty Gritty Surround	John McEuen and Jimmy Ibbotson	AIX Records
2001	Hummingbirds of the Americas	Jimmy Ibbotson	Flying Dog Records
2004	Intent On Contentment	Jimmy Ibbotson	Unami Records
2005	Daylight	Jimmy Ibbotson	Unami Records
2007	Canyon	Jimmy Ibbotson	Unami Records

Album information from liner notes unless otherwise noted.

=== Non-album tracks ===
The "Ballad of the Monon Bell" celebrates the annual football game between DePauw University and Wabash College, a rivalry which dates back to 1890 and awards the winner the prized railroad bell. Jimmy Ibbotson (a 1969 graduate of DePauw) recorded the song, which can be downloaded for free from the DePauw website.

=== Put the Wet Stuff on the Red Stuff ===
In 2004 the Aspen Fire Protection District produced the DVD Put the Wet Stuff on the Red Stuff, a 48-minute documentary film on the history of the Aspen Volunteer Fire Department. Ibbotson provides the narration. The AVFD traces its roots back to the silver boom days in Aspen. In 1881 the town devoted $200 to provide a fire department. The film was written by Ben Gagnon and produced by Darryl Grob.
