= Jeff Hanna =

American singer-songwriter (born 1947)

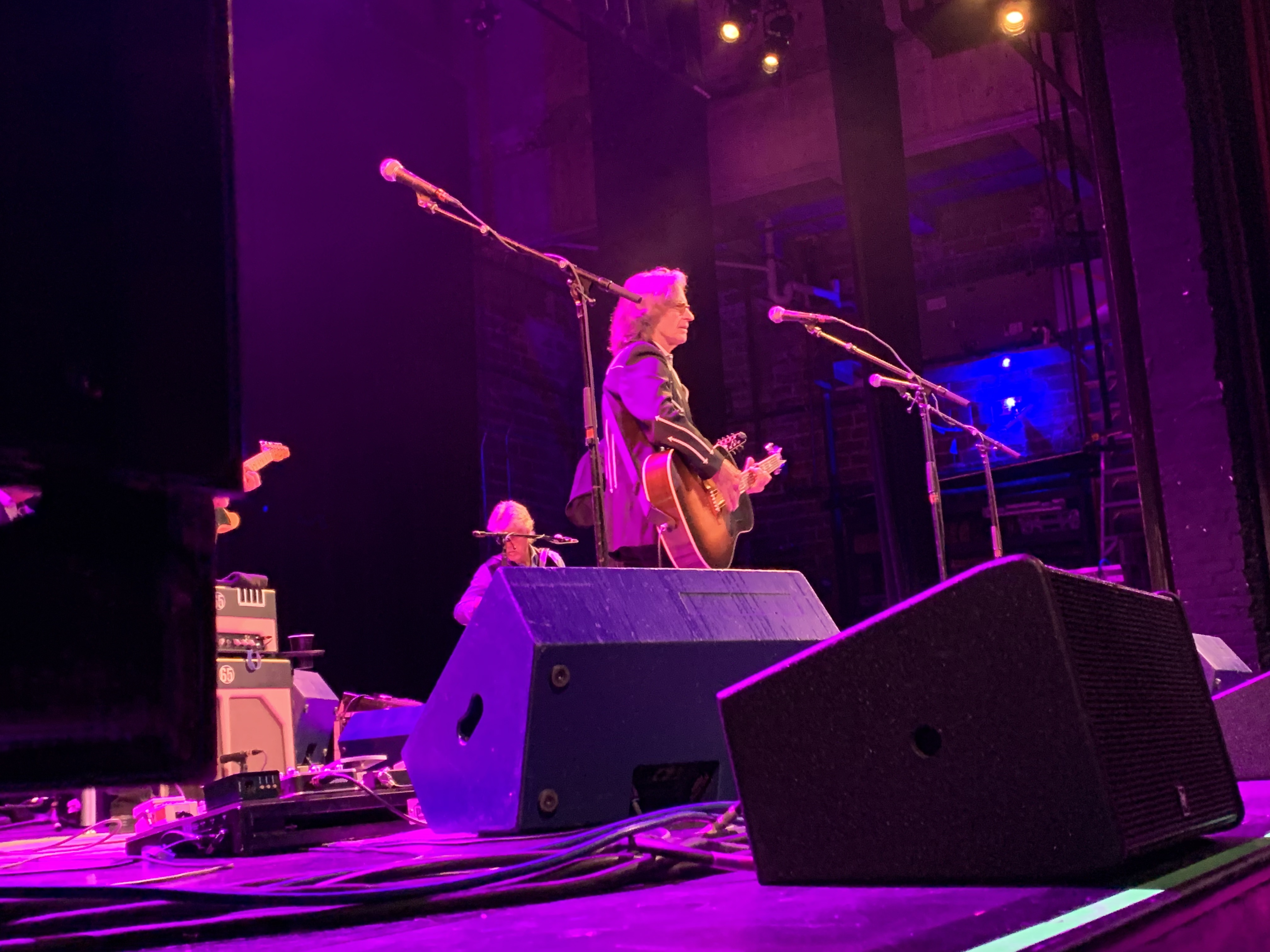
- Hanna performing with Nitty Gritty Dirt Band, 2024

Background information
- Born: Jeffrey R. Hanna; July 11, 1947 (age 78); Detroit, Michigan, U.S.
- Origin: Long Beach, California, U.S.
- Genres: Country, folk, rock
- Occupations: Singer, songwriter
- Instruments: Vocals, guitar, drums
- Years active: 1966 – present
- Member of: Nitty Gritty Dirt Band
- Spouse: Matraca Berg (m. 1993)

Jeffrey R. Hanna (born July 11, 1947) is an American singer-songwriter and performance musician, best known for his association with the Nitty Gritty Dirt Band. His professional music career has spanned six decades.

== Early life ==
Hanna was born in Detroit, Michigan. In 1962, he moved with his family to Long Beach, California. As a high school student there, he and some friends started a jug band that ultimately evolved into the Nitty Gritty Dirt Band.

== Musical career ==
He was one of the founders and is the longest-serving member of the Nitty Gritty Dirt Band, where he has been a singer, songwriter, lead guitarist, drummer and washboard player. Through the years, he has been a major force in keeping the band together and maintaining its blend of folk, country and rock music.

Hanna has over 380 recording credits, primarily as a composer, but also as a vocalist, guitarist (acoustic, electric, steel, slide, twelve-string, and baritone), arranger, and producer.

In addition to the Nitty Gritty Dirt Band, his credits include work with artists such as Linda Ronstadt, Suzy Bogguss, The Texas Tenors, Patty Loveless, Rascal Flatts, Matraca Berg, Hannah Montana, Emmylou Harris, The Chieftains, Johnny Cash, June Carter Cash, Earl Scruggs, Michael Martin Murphey, Dickey Betts, and Steve Martin.

In 2006, his composition "Bless the Broken Road", co-written with Marcus Hummon and Bobby Boyd in 1994, won a Grammy Award for Best Country Song. It has been recorded by the Nitty Gritty Dirt Band, Marcus Hummon, and, in the Grammy year, Rascal Flatts.

== Personal life ==
Two children were born to Hanna and first wife, Rae Taylor Hoyt. Their youngest son, visual artist Christopher Hanna, predeceased them in 2013. Their older son is singer-songwriter and guitarist, Jaime Hanna, formerly a touring member of the Mavericks before founding the duo Hanna-McEuen. He joined Nitty Gritty Dirt Band in 2018.

Hanna's second marriage was to Melody McNair. He has now been married to Matraca Berg since December 5, 1993. The couple met while touring with Clint Black in the late 1980s. They live in Nashville, Tennessee.
