= David Grisman discography =

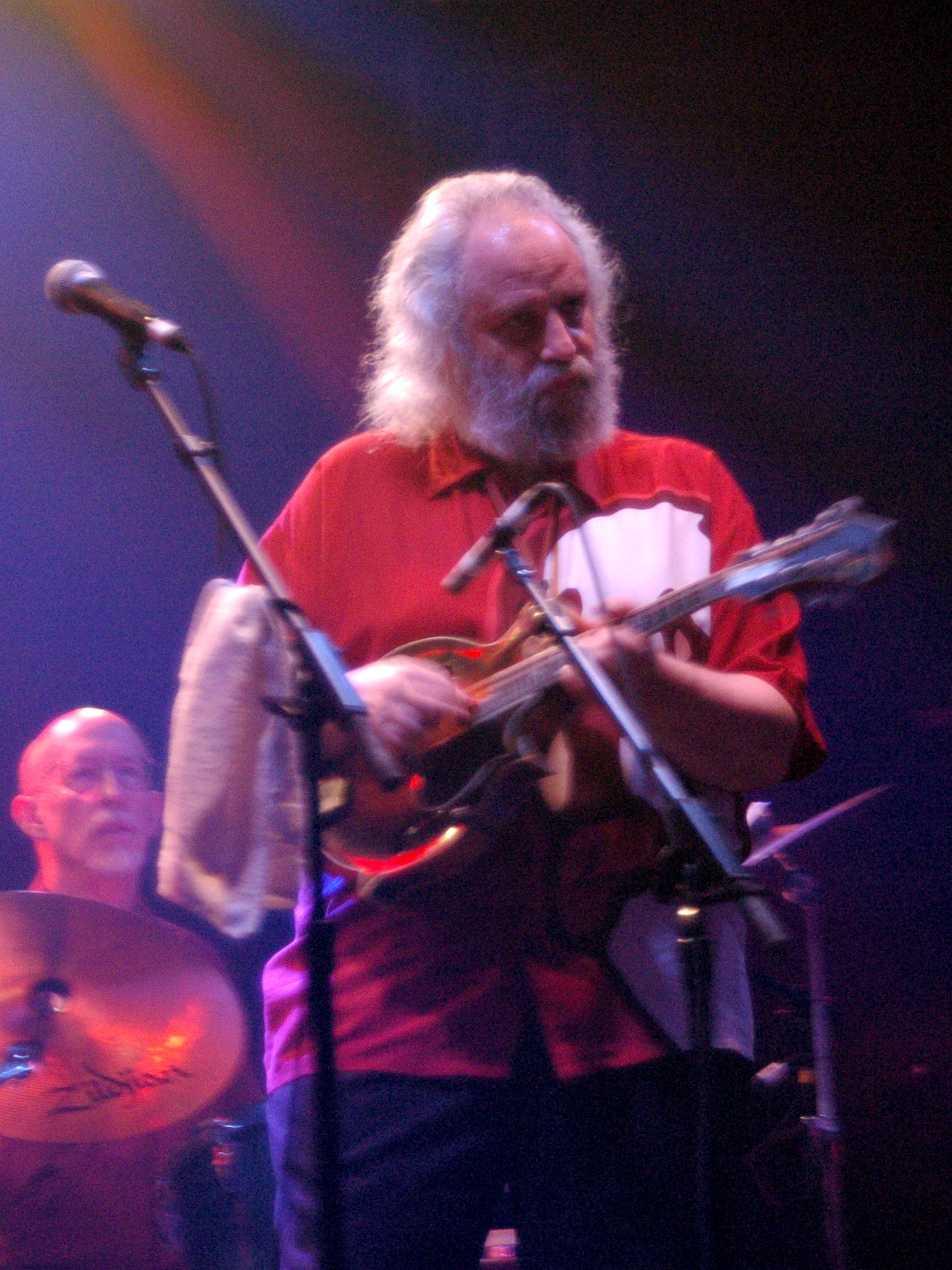

David Grisman has issued albums with his groups the David Grisman Quintet and Old & In the Way, performed in duos with Jerry Garcia, Andy Statman, Martin Taylor, Hazel Dickens and Alice Gerrard, John Sebastian, Tony Rice, and played in the psychedelic band Earth Opera with Peter Rowan. He has produced solo albums and collaborated with musicians in many genres.

== As leader or co-leader ==
- 1976 The David Grisman Rounder Record (Rounder)
- 1977 The David Grisman Quintet (Kaleidoscope)
- 1978 Hot Dawg (Horizon)
- 1980 Early Dawg (Sugar Hill)
- 1980 Quintet '80 (Warner Bros.)
- 1981 Stephane Grappelli/David Grisman Live (Warner Bros.)
- 1981 Mondo Mando (Warner Bros.) – illustrated by Wayne Anderson
- 1983 Here Today (Rounder)
- 1982 Dawg Jazz/Dawg Grass (Warner Bros.)
- 1983 David Grisman's Acoustic Christmas (Rounder)
- 1983 Mandolin Abstractions with Andy Statman (Rounder)
- 1984 Acousticity (MCA)
- 1987 Svingin' with Svend with Svend Asmussen (Zebra)
- 1988 Home Is Where the Heart Is (Rounder)
- 1990 Dawg '90 (Acoustic Disc)
- 1991 Bluegrass Reunion (Acoustic Disc)
- 1991 Jerry Garcia / David Grisman with Jerry Garcia (Acoustic Disc)
- 1993 Dawgwood (Acoustic Disc)
- 1993 Not for Kids Only with Jerry Garcia (Acoustic Disc)
- 1993 Common Chord (Rounder)
- 1994 Tone Poems with Tony Rice (Acoustic Disc)
- 1995 Tone Poems 2 with Martin Taylor (Acoustic Disc)
- 1995 Dawganova (Acoustic Disc)
- 1995 Songs of Our Fathers with Andy Statman (Acoustic Disc)
- 1996 Shady Grove with Jerry Garcia (Acoustic Disc)
- 1996 DGQ-20 (Acoustic Disc)
- 1997 Doc & Dawg with Doc Watson
- 1998 So What with Jerry Garcia (Acoustic Disc)
- 1999 Retrograss (Acoustic Disc)
- 1999 Dawg Duos (Acoustic Disc)
- 1999 I'm Beginning to See the Light with Martin Taylor (Acoustic Disc)
- 2000 The Pizza Tapes with Jerry Garcia and Tony Rice (Acoustic Disc)
- 2000 Tone Poems 3 (Acoustic Disc)
- 2001 Grateful Dawg with Jerry Garcia (Acoustic Disc)
- 2001 Traversata with Carlo Aonzo and Beppe Gambetta (Acoustic Disc)
- 2001 New River with Denny Zeitlin (Acoustic Disc)
- 2002 Dawgnation (Acoustic Disc)
- 2003 Hold On, We're Strummin' with Sam Bush (Acoustic Disc)
- 2003 Life of Sorrow (Acoustic Disc)
- 2004 Been All Around This World with Jerry Garcia (Acoustic Disc)
- 2006 New Shabbos Waltz with Andy Statman (Acoustic Disc)
- 2006 Dawg's Groove (Acoustic Disc)
- 2006 DGBX (Acoustic Disc)
- 2007 The Living Room Sessions (Acoustic Disc)
- 2007 Satisfied with John Sebastian (Acoustic Disc)
- 2011 Folk Jazz Trio (Acoustic Disc)
- 2011 Live at Wigmore Hall 4/21/96 (Acoustic Disc) with Martin Taylor
- 2016 Del & Dawg Live! (Acoustic Disc)
- 2016 David Grisman Sextet (Acoustic Disc)
- 2017 Muddy Roads (Acoustic Disc)
- 2017 Frank 'n' Dawg (Acoustic Disc) with Frank Vignola
- 2017 Pickin (Acoustic Disc) with Tommy Emmanuel
- 2019 The Dawg Trio (Acoustic Disc) with Danny Barnes and Samson Grisman
- 2024 Dawgnilo! (Acoustic Disc) with Danilo Brito

== As a group member ==
Earth Opera

- Earth Opera (Elektra, 1968)
- The Great American Eagle Tragedy (Elektra, 1969)

Muleskinner

- Muleskinner (1973) – re-released as A Potpourri of Bluegrass Jam
- Muleskinner Live: Original Television Soundtrack (1994) – rec. 1973

Old & In the Way

- Old & In the Way (1975)
- That High Lonesome Sound (1996)
- Breakdown (1997)
- Old & In the Gray (2002)
- Live at the Boarding House (2008)
- Live at the Boarding House: The Complete Shows (2013)
- Live at Sonoma State – 11/4/73 (2023)

== Chronological discography ==
=== 1963–1980 ===
- The Even Dozen Jug Band (1963)
- Earth Opera (1968)
- The Great American Eagle Tragedy (1969)
- American Beauty (1970) – played on two songs, "Friend of the Devil" and "Ripple"
- Won't You Come and Sing for Me (Hazel & Alice) (1973) – rec. 1965
- Muleskinner (1973)
- The Pointer Sisters, That's a Plenty (1974)
- Old & In the Way (1975)
- Eat My Dust soundtrack (1976)
- The David Grisman Rounder Record (1976)
- The David Grisman Quintet (1977)
- Hot Dawg (1978)
- Bluegrass Guitar with Eric Thompson (1979)
- Early Dawg (1980) – rec. 1966
- Quintet '80 1980)

=== 1981–1990 ===
- Mondo Mando (1981)
- Stephane Grappelli/David Grisman Live (1981)
- Here Today (1982)
- David Grisman's Acoustic Christmas (1983)
- Dawg Jazz/Dawg Grass (1983)
- Mandolin Abstractions (1983)
- Acousticity (1984)
- Svingin' with Svend (1987)
- Home Is Where the Heart Is (1988)
- Dawg '90 (1990)

=== 1991–2000 ===
- Jerry Garcia / David Grisman (1991)
- Bluegrass Reunion (1992) – rec. 1991
- Common Chord (1993)
- Not for Kids Only (1993)
- Dawgwood (1993)
- Tone Poems (1994)
- Mike Seeger, Third Annual Farewell Reunion (1994)
- Dawganova (1995)
- Songs of Our Fathers (1995)
- Tone Poems 2 (1995)
- DGQ-20 (1996)
- Shady Grove (1996)
- That High Lonesome Sound (1996)
- Breakdown (1997)
- Doc & Dawg (1997)
- Muleskinner Live: Original Television Soundtrack (1998) – live rec. 1973
- So What (1998)
- Retrograss (1999)
- Dawg Duos (1999)
- I'm Beginning to See the Light (1999)
- Tone Poems 3 (2000)
- The Pizza Tapes (2000)

=== 2001–2010 ===
- Grateful Dawg with Jerry Garcia (2001) – soundtrack
- New River with Danny Zeitlin (2001)
- Traversata with Beppe Gambetta, Carlo Aonzo (2001)
- Old & In the Gray (2002)
- Dawgnation (2002)
- Life of Sorrow (2003)
- Hold On, We're Strummin' (2003)
- Been All Around This World (2004)
- Dawg's Groove (2006)
- DGBX (2006)
- New Shabbos Waltz (2006)
- The Living Room Sessions (2007)
- Satisfied (2007)
- Live at the Boarding House (2008) – live rec. 1973

=== 2011–present ===
- David Grisman's Folk Jazz Trio (2011)
- Live at Wigmore Hall (2011)
- Live at the Boarding House: The Complete Shows (2013) – live rec. 1973
- Del & Dawg Live! (2016)
- David Grisman Sextet (2016)
- Muddy Roads (2017)
- Frank 'n' Dawg (2017)
- Pickin (2017)
- The Dawg Trio (2019)
- Live at Sonoma State – 11/4/73 (2023) – live rec. 1973
- Dawgnilo! (2024)
