= DGQ-20 =

Compilation album by David Grisman Quintet
- Released: 1996
- Genre: Americana, newgrass, jazz, Latin music
- Length: 214:49
- Label: Acoustic Disc
- Producer: David Grisman

David Grisman chronology
Tone Poems 2 (1995)	DGQ-20 (1996)	Shady Grove (1996)

David Grisman Quintet chronology
Dawganova (1995)	DGQ-20 (1995)	Dawgnation (2002)

Tony Rice chronology
Bluegrass Album, Vol. 6 (1996)	DGQ-20 (1996)	Tony Rice Sings Gordon Lightfoot (1996)

Professional ratings
Review scores
Source	Rating
Allmusic	4/5 stars

DGQ-20 is a 1996 compilation album by American musician David Grisman, recorded with his group David Grisman Quintet. Spanning the period from 1976 to 1996, this triple-CD set offers 39 songs, 18 of which were not released by Grisman before. Musicians include Tony Rice, Béla Fleck, Sam Bush, Mark O'Connor, Stephane Grappelli and others.

The album includes both live and studio performances and contains collaborations with Svend Asmussen, Jethro Burns, Vassar Clements and others. Many genres are blended here, including classic American pop, instrumental jazz, Klezmer, Latin, folk, bluegrass and classical music.

== Track listing ==
=== Disc 1 (1976–1981) ===
1. Introductions
2. Cedar Hill (Grisman)
3. Theme From Capone (Grisman)
4. Dawg Patch (Grisman)
5. Spain (Chick Corea, Rodrigo)
6. Shasta Bull (Grisman)
7. Tipsy Gipsy (Grisman)
8. Waiting On Vassar (Grisman)
9. Key Signator (Darol Anger)
10. Dawgma (Grisman)
11. Swing '39 (Stephane Grappelli, Django Reinhardt)
12. Ricochet (Grisman, Somers)
13. Pickin' In The Wind (Mark O'Connor)
14. Because (John Lennon/Paul McCartney)
15. Flatbush Waltz/Opus 57 (Andy Statman, David Grisman)
16. Albuquerque Turkey (Grisman)
17. Mondo Mando (Grisman)

=== Disc 2 (1982–1988) ===
1. God Rest Ye Merry, Gentlemen (trad.)
2. Dawg Funk (Grisman)
3. Dawgy Mountain Breakdown (Grisman)
4. Free Dawg Night (Grisman)
5. Syeeda's Song Flute (Coltrane)
6. Lonesome Moonlight Waltz (Bill Monroe)
7. Steppin' With Stephane (Grisman)
8. Newmonia (Grisman)
9. Prelude in C minor (Frédéric Chopin)
10. Latin Lover (Vandellos)
11. Sativa (Grisman)

=== Disc 3 (1989–1996) ===
1. Svingin' With Svend (Grisman)
2. Opus 38 (Grisman)
3. Telluride (Grisman)
4. EMD (Grisman)
5. Blue Midnight (Grisman)
6. Jazzin' With Jazzbeaux (Collins, Grisman)
7. Rattlesnake (Grisman)
8. Dawgnation (Grisman)
9. 16/16 (Grisman)
10. Dawgology (Greene, Grisman)
11. Shalom Aleichem (trad.)

== Personnel ==
- David Grisman – mandolin, mandola
- Enrique Coria – guitar
- Matt Eakle – flute
- Jim Kerwin – bass
- Joe Craven – percussion, violin

with

- Norton Buffalo – harmonica
- Jim Buchanan – mandolin, violin
- Hal Blaine – percussion
- Mike Marshall – guitar, mandolin, violin
- Dmitri Vandellos, Jerry Garcia – guitar
- Rick Montgomery, Jon Sholle – guitar
- Kronos Quartet – strings
- John Carlini, Tony Rice, Diz Disley – guitar
- Stephane Grappelli, Matt Glaser – violin
- Mark O'Connor – violin, guitar, mandolin
- Vassar Clements, Svend Asmusssen – violin
- Darol Anger – violin, mandolin
- Bill Amatneek, Todd Phillips – bass
- Rob Wasserman, Ray Brown – bass
- Jethro Burns – mandolin
- Eric Silver – banjo
- Al "Jazzbo" Collins – vocals
