= Dawgnation =

Studio album by David Grisman Quintet
- Released: June 25, 2002
- Studio: Dawg Studios
- Genres: Bluegrass, country
- Length: 66:03
- Label: Acoustic Disc
- Producer: David Grisman

David Grisman chronology
| Old & In the Gray (2002) | Dawgnation (2002) | Life of Sorrow (2003) |

David Grisman Quintet chronology
| DGQ-20 (1995) | Dawgnation (2002) | Dawg's Groove (2006) |

Professional ratings
Review scores
| Source | Rating |
|---|---|
| Allmusic | 3/5 stars |
| The Music Box | 4/5 stars |

Dawgnation is an album by the David Grisman Quintet led by mandolinist David Grisman.

== Track listing ==
All tracks are written by David Grisman.

| No. | Title | Length |
|---|---|---|
| 1. | "Citizens of Dawgnation" | 0:23 |
| 2. | "Slade" | 6:51 |
| 3. | "Mellow Mang" | 6:29 |
| 4. | "Why Did the Mouse Marry the Elephant?" | 3:47 |
| 5. | "Cha Cha Chihuahua" | 6:21 |
| 6. | "Desert Dawg" | 3:35 |
| 7. | "Twin Town" | 4:10 |
| 8. | "Vivacé" | 5:07 |
| 9. | "Mr. Coolberg" | 4:30 |
| 10. | "Dawgnation" | 5:43 |
| 11. | "Bluegrass at the Beach" | 6:08 |
| 12. | "Argentine Trio" | 5:10 |
| 13. | "Dawg After Dark" | 7:49 |

== Personnel ==
- David Grisman – mandolin, mandola
- Enrique Coria – guitar, whistle
- Matt Eakle – flute, bass flute
- Jim Kerwin – double bass
- Joe Craven – percussion, violin, mandolin
