= Tone Poems 3 =

Studio album by David Grisman, Mike Auldridge, Bob Brozman
- Released: August 22, 2000
- Recorded: February 1999
- Studio: Dawg Studio
- Genre: Jazz, bluegrass, country
- Length: 48:48
- Label: Acoustic Disc
- Producer: David Grisman

David Grisman chronology
I'm Beginning to See the Light (1999)	Tone Poems 3 (2000)	The Pizza Tapes (2000)

Professional ratings
Review scores
Source	Rating
AllMusic	4/5 stars

Tone Poems 3 is an album by mandolinist David Grisman, dobro player Mike Auldridge, and guitarist Bob Brozman that was released in 2000 by Grisman's label, Acoustic Disc. The album is a sequel to Grisman's albums Tone Poems and Tone Poems 2, which were recorded with Tony Rice and Martin Taylor, respectively. The trio plays vintage slide and resophonic instruments such as the Dobro and resonator guitar. The songs cover many genres: Hawaiian, blues, country, bluegrass, and jazz.

== Track listing ==
1. Nostalgia Prelude (Brozman) 2:21
2. Akaka Falls (Parker, traditional) 2:03
3. Moonlight Bay (traditional, Percy Wenrich) 2:24
4. Peach Pickin' Time in Georgia (Clayton McMichen) 1:31
5. St. Louis Blues (W. C. Handy) 3:27
6. Whispering (traditional) 3:07
7. Trash Can Stomp (Auldridge) 2:18
8. Frankie and Johnny (traditional) 1:56
9. Kohala march (traditional) 2:09
10. Crazy Rhythm (Irving Caesar, Roger Wolfe Kahn, Joseph Meyer) 3:33
11. Beat Biscuit Blues (Auldridge) 2:55
12. The Great Speckled Bird (Guy Smith) 2:26
13. It Happened in Monterey (Billy Rose, Mabel Wayne) 3:03
14. Limehouse Blues (Philip Braham, Douglas Furber) 2:23
15. Style O Blues (Auldridge) 2:31
16. Honolulu Nights (traditional) 1:46
17. Stompin' at the Savoy (Benny Goodman, Andy Razaf, Edgar Sampson, Chick Webb) 2:27
18. Fort Worth Drag (York) 1:05
19. Just Joshin' (Josh Graves, Tullock) 1:34
20. New Steal (Auldridge) 2:23
21. Las Niñas (Auldridge) 1:26

== Personnel ==
- David Grisman – guitar, slide mandolin, tenor guitar
- Mike Auldridge – guitar, Dobro, resophonic guitar
- Bob Brozman – guitar, Dobro, resophonic guitar, ukulele
