= Dawganova =

Studio album by David Grisman Quintet
- Released: 1995
- Genre: Americana, newgrass, jazz, Latin music
- Length: 55:19
- Label: Acoustic Disc
- Producer: David Grisman

David Grisman chronology
Tone Poems (1994)	Dawganova (1995)	Songs of Our Fathers (1995)

David Grisman Quintet chronology
Dawgwood (1993)	Dawganova (1995)	DGQ-20 (1995)

Professional ratings
Review scores
Source	Rating
Allmusic	3/5 stars

Dawganova is a 1995 all-instrumental album by American musician David Grisman, recorded with his group The David Grisman Quintet. It's a unique collection of Latin rhythms and melodies inspired by the group's newest member, Argentine guitar virtuoso, Enrique Coria. Five Grisman originals are accompanied by classical Latin standards: "El Cumbanchero", "Tico Tico", "Manha de Carnaval" and the Nat "King" Cole classic "Nature Boy".

In his Allmusic review, Stephen Thomas Erlewine stated "Grisman's distinctive blend of bluegrass, folk, jazz, and, in this case, latin music is energetic and very impressive."

== Track listing ==
All songs by David Grisman unless otherwise noted.

1. "Dawganova" – 6:50
2. "Manha de Carnaval" (Luiz Bonfá) – 7:06
3. "Barkley's Bug" – 5:37
4. "Nature Boy" (eden ahbez) – 7:49
5. "El Cumbanchero" (Rafael Hernández Marín) – 4:38
6. "Brazilian Breeze" – 5:55
7. "Tico Tico" (Zequinha de Abreu) – 4:30
8. "April's Wedding Bossa" – 6:43
9. "Caliente" – 6:11

== Personnel ==
- David Grisman – mandolin, mandola
- Enrique Coria – guitar
- Matt Eakle – flute, bass flute
- Jim Kerwin – bass
- Joe Craven – percussion, violin, cover design
