= Jerry Garcia / David Grisman =

Studio album by Jerry Garcia and David Grisman
- Released: August 23, 1991
- Recorded: Spring 1991
- Genres: Progressive bluegrass, new acoustic
- Label: Acoustic Disc
- Producers: Jerry Garcia; David Grisman

Jerry Garcia and David Grisman chronology
Jerry Garcia / David Grisman (1991)	Not for Kids Only (1993)

Jerry Garcia chronology
Almost Acoustic (1988)	Jerry Garcia / David Grisman (1991)	Jerry Garcia Band (1991)

David Grisman chronology
Bluegrass Reunion (1991)	Jerry Garcia / David Grisman (1991)	Dawgwood (1993)

Professional ratings
Review scores
Source	Rating
Allmusic	4.5/5 stars
Rolling Stone	4/5 stars

Jerry Garcia / David Grisman is an album of folk music by Jerry Garcia and David Grisman. It was the second album released under Grisman's record label Acoustic Disc (after Dawg '90).

Jerry Garcia / David Grisman was nominated for a Grammy Award for Best Contemporary Folk Album.

== Track listing ==
1. "The Thrill is Gone" (Hawkins, Rick Darnell)
2. "Grateful Dawg" (Garcia, Grisman)
3. "Two Soldiers" (traditional)
4. "Friend of the Devil" (Garcia, Hunter, Dawson)
5. "Russian Lullaby" (Berlin)
6. "Dawg's Waltz" (Grisman)
7. "Walkin' Boss" (traditional)
8. "Rockin' Chair" (Carmichael)
9. "Arabia" (Grisman; middle part based on the Cuban folk theme "Hasta Siempre")

== Personnel ==
=== Musicians ===
- Jerry Garcia – guitar, vocals
- David Grisman – mandolin
- Jim Kerwin – bass
- Joe Craven – percussion, fiddle

=== Production ===
- Produced by Jerry Garcia and David Grisman
- Recorded by David Dennison
- Mixed by Jerry & Dawg with Decibel Dave
- Production assistance by Craig Miller
- Mastered by Paul Stubblebine
- Cover design by David Grisman & Django Bayless
- Photography by Gary Nichols
- Strings by D'Addario

== See also ==
- Acoustic Disc
