= Not for Kids Only =

Studio album by Jerry Garcia and David Grisman
- Released: October 20, 1993
- Recorded: Mid-1993
- Genres: Progressive bluegrass, new acoustic
- Label: Acoustic Disc
- Producer: David Grisman

Jerry Garcia and David Grisman chronology
Jerry Garcia / David Grisman (1991)	Not for Kids Only (1993)	Shady Grove (1996)

Jerry Garcia chronology
Fire Up Plus (1992)	Not for Kids Only (1993)	Shady Grove (1996)

David Grisman chronology
Dawgwood (1993)	Not for Kids Only (1993)	Common Chord (1993)

Not for Kids Only is an album by Jerry Garcia (acoustic guitar, vocals) and David Grisman (mandolin, vocals). It contains traditional children's songs, performed in a folk music style. It was recorded and released in 1993.

The song "Jenny Jenkins" is featured in the 2015 compilation album This Record Belongs To....

== Critical reception ==
Professional ratings
Review scores
Source	Rating
Allmusic	4.5/5 stars
The Music Box	5/5 stars

On AllMusic, Lindsay Planer said, "Not for Kids Only (1993) is an album of folkie standards and traditional tunes... The obvious kinship between the musicians radiates throughout every track as their moods alternate between light and silly "There Ain't No Bugs on Me" to the darker-edged "When First Unto This Country".... One of the most endearing cuts is the comedic dialogue between Garcia and Grisman on "Arkansas Traveller"."

In The Music Box, John Metzger wrote, "[In the early-to-mid 1990s Jerry Garcia] managed to find time to reconnect with old pal David Grisman for a series of recording projects, jam sessions, and occasional concert performances. The second album spawned from this fruitful collaboration was the lighthearted Not for Kids Only. As the title suggests, one need not have children to enjoy this collection of traditional tunes and folk standards."

== Track listing ==
1. "Jenny Jenkins" (Traditional) - 4:22
2. "Freight Train" (Elizabeth Cotten) - 5:20
3. "A Horse Named Bill" (Traditional) - 3:04
4. "Three Men Went A-Hunting" (Traditional) - 3:15
5. "When First Unto This Country" (Traditional) - 4:01
6. "Arkansas Traveller" (Traditional) - 3:28
7. "Hopalong Peter" (Traditional) - 2:37
8. "Teddy Bears' Picnic" (Irving Berlin) - 4:26
9. "There Ain't No Bugs On Me" (Fiddlin' John Carson arr. by David Grisman) - 4:50
10. "The Miller's Will" (Traditional) - 3:09
11. "Hot Corn, Cold Corn" (Traditional) - 4:02
12. "A Shenandoah Lullaby" ("Oh Shenandoah" and an instrumental version of Brahms' Lullaby) (Traditional) - 7:52

== Personnel ==
Musicians

- David Grisman - mandolin, mandocello, tenor banjo, vocals
- Jerry Garcia - guitar, vocals
- Hal Blaine - percussion, tambourine
- Joe Craven - violin, percussion, foot stomping
- Matt Eakle - piccolo, penny whistle
- Larry Granger - violoncello
- Larry Hanks - Jew's-Harp
- Heather Katz - violin
- Jim Kerwin - bass
- Daniel Kobialka - violin
- Pamela Lanford - English horn, oboe
- Jim Miller - slap bass
- Rick Montgomery - guitar
- Kevin Porter - trombone
- John Rosenberg - piano
- Jim Rothermel - clarinet
- Willow Scarlett - harmonica
- Nanci Severance - viola
- Jody Stecher - violin, vocals
- Peter Welker - trumpet

Production

- Produced by David Grisman
- Recording: David Dennison
- Mixing: David Grisman, David Dennison
- Production assistance: Craig Miller
- Mastering: Paul Stubblebine
- Artwork: Jerry Garcia
- Photography: Susana Millman
- Art direction: Mike Moser
- Notes: Mayne Smith
