= Dawg '90 =

Studio album by David Grisman Quintet
- Released: 1990
- Genre: Americana, newgrass, jazz
- Length: 55:22
- Label: Acoustic Disc
- Producer: David Grisman

David Grisman chronology
Home Is Where the Heart Is (1988)	Dawg '90 (1990)	Bluegrass Reunion (1991)

David Grisman Quintet chronology
Mondo Mando (1981)	Dawg '90 (1990)	Dawgwood (1993)

Professional ratings
Review scores
Source	Rating
Allmusic	4.5/5 stars

Dawg '90 is an all-instrumental album by American musician David Grisman, recorded with his group David Grisman Quintet in 1990. It is the first album released by Grisman's own label, Acoustic Disc.

In his Allmusic review, Ken Dryden stated: "Grisman's fascinating blend of elements of jazz, gypsy music, and bluegrass with additional influences help all ten compositions remain fresh after numerous hearings." The album was the first album for which Grisman received a Grammy nomination.

== Track listing ==
All songs by David Grisman

1. "Pupville" – 3:12
2. "Chili Dawg" – 5:35
3. "Mad Max" – 3:31
4. "O'Banion's Wake" – 4:42
5. "Dawg Daze" – 5:02
6. "'Lil Samba" – 6:27
7. "Learned Pigs" – 3:45
8. "Gypsy Nights" – 6:09
9. "Hot Club Swing" – 4:27
10. "Sativa" – 12:32

== Personnel ==
- David Grisman – mandolin
- John Carlini – guitar
- Matt Eakle – flute
- Jim Kerwin – bass
- Joe Craven – percussion, violin

Additional musicians:

- Mark O'Connor – violin
- Matt Glaser – violin

== Chart positions ==
Year	Chart	Position
1981	Billboard Jazz Albums	12
1981	The Billboard 200	174
