= Dawgwood =

Studio album by David Grisman Quintet
- Released: 1993
- Genres: Americana, newgrass, jazz
- Length: 55:22
- Label: Acoustic Disc
- Producer: David Grisman

David Grisman chronology
Jerry Garcia / David Grisman (1991)	Dawgwood (1993)	Not for Kids Only (1993)

David Grisman Quintet chronology
Dawg '90 (1990)	Dawgwood (1993)	Dawganova (1995)

Professional ratings
Review scores
Source	Rating
Allmusic	4/5 stars

Dawgwood is a 1993 all-instrumental album by American musician David Grisman, recorded with his group David Grisman Quintet. It is the second album recorded under Grisman's own label, Acoustic Disc. Grisman's self-named "Dawg" music was well established when this album was recorded — it is influenced by traditional bluegrass, jazz, gypsy music, Latin and more. Most of the songs are composed by Grisman, the two covers being Django Reinhardt's "Bolero de Django" — a gypsy song which Matt Eakle's flute gives a more modern flavour and "Asanhado" by Jacob do Bandolim. The last piece on the album, "New Dawg´s Rag" is a song previously released on album The David Grisman Quintet, but with "updated" arrangement.

== Track listing ==
All songs by David Grisman unless otherwise noted.

1. "Dawgwood" – 3:36
2. "Dawgmatism" – 6:39
3. "Jazzin'" (with Joe-Bob) – 5:33
4. "Sea of Cortez" – 6:20
5. "Steppin' With Stephane" – 6:42
6. "Bolero de Django" (Django Reinhardt) – 5:58
7. "Asanhado" (Jacob do Bandolim) – 6:17
8. "New Dawg's Rag"

== Personnel ==
- David Grisman – mandolin
- Rick Montgomery – guitar
- Matt Eakle – flute
- Jim Kerwin – bass
- Joe Craven – percussion, violin
