= Shady Grove (Jerry Garcia and David Grisman album) =

Studio album by Jerry Garcia and David Grisman
- Released: 1996
- Recorded: August 8, 1990 – June 3, 1993
- Genres: Progressive bluegrass, new acoustic
- Length: 61:06
- Label: Acoustic Disc
- Producers: Jerry Garcia; David Grisman

Jerry Garcia and David Grisman chronology
Not for Kids Only (1993)	Shady Grove (1996)	So What (1998)

Jerry Garcia chronology
Not for Kids Only (1993)	Shady Grove (1996)	That High Lonesome Sound (1996)

David Grisman chronology
DGQ-20 (1996)	Shady Grove (1996)	That High Lonesome Sound (1996)

Professional ratings
Review scores
Source	Rating
Allmusic	3/5 stars
The Music Box	5/5 stars
Rolling Stone	(favorable)

Shady Grove is an acoustic album by Jerry Garcia and David Grisman. It was released on the Acoustic Disc record label in 1996. The album was produced by Garcia and Grisman for Dawg Productions. Also appearing on the album: Joe Craven, Jim Kerwin, Matt Eakle, Bryan Bowers, and Will Scarlett. "Hesitation Blues" is an uncredited track appearing at the end of the album.

== Track listing ==
1. "Shady Grove" – 4:19
2. "Stealin'" – 3:31
3. "Off to Sea Once More" – 5:48
4. "The Sweet Sunny South" – 3:25
5. "Louis Collins" (Mississippi John Hurt)– 5:57
6. "Fair Ellender" – 6:05
7. "Jackaroo"– 4:02
8. "The Ballad of Casey Jones" – 4:07
9. "Dreadful Wind and Rain" – 4:46
10. "I Truly Understand" – 3:40
11. "The Handsome Cabin Boy" – 6:13
12. "Whiskey in the Jar" – 4:14
13. "Down in the Valley" – 4:59
14. "Hesitation Blues" – 3:32

== Personnel ==
Musicians

- Jerry Garcia – guitar, banjo, vocals
- David Grisman – mandolin, mandola, mandolin-banjo, banjo, guitar, vocals
- Joe Craven – fiddle, percussion
- Jim Kerwin – bass
- Matt Eakle – flute
- Bryan Bowers – autoharp
- Will Scarlett – harmonica

Production

- Produced by David Grisman and Jerry Garcia
- Executive producer: Craig Miller
- Mastering: Paul Stubblebine
- Recording: David Dennison
- Mixing: David Grisman, Larry Cumings
- Notes: John Cohen
- Design, layout, and cover photography: D. Brent Hausman
- Photography: Jay Blakesberg, John Cohen, Robert Frank, David Gahr, Susana Millman, Gary Nichols, Jon Sievert, Bob Yellin.

== Chart positions ==
Chart (1996)	Peak Position
U.S. Billboard 200	135
U.S. Billboard Top Country Albums	19
