= Dawg Jazz/Dawg Grass =

Studio album by David Grisman
- Released: 1983
- Genre: Americana, newgrass, jazz
- Label: Warner Bros.

David Grisman chronology
David Grisman's Acoustic Christmas (1983)	Dawg Jazz/Dawg Grass (1983)	Mandolin Abstractions (1983)

Alternative Cover
- Back cover of the LP

Professional ratings
Review scores
Source	Rating
Allmusic	4.5/5 stars

Dawg Jazz/Dawg Grass is an album by American musician David Grisman, released in 1983.

== Track listing ==
1. "Dawg Jazz"
2. "Steppin' with Stephane"
3. "Fumblebee"
4. "In a Sentimental Mood" (Duke Ellington, Irving Mills, Manny Kurtz)
5. "14 Miles to Barstow"
6. "Swamp Dawg"
7. "Dawggy Mountain Breakdown"
8. "Wayfaring Stranger" (Traditional)
9. "Happy Birthday Bill Monroe"
10. "Dawg Grass"

== Personnel ==
- David Grisman – mandolin, vocals
- Tony Rice – guitar, vocals
- Stephane Grappelli – violin
- Darol Anger – mandolin, vocals
- Earl Scruggs – banjo
- Rob Wasserman – bass
- Mike Marshall – guitar, mandolin, vocals
- Ross Tomkins – piano
- Martin Taylor – guitar
- Don Ashworth – woodwind
- John Bambridge – woodwind
- Tommy Newsom – woodwind
- John Audino – trumpet
- Pete Chrisleib – saxophone
- Gilbert Falco – trombone
- Bernie Pack – trombone
- Bruce Paulson – trombone

== Credits ==
- Producer - David Grisman
- Executive Producer - Craig Miller
- Engineering - John Haeny and Bob Shumaker
- Mastering - Greg Fulginiti

== Chart positions ==
Year	Chart	Position
1983	Billboard Jazz Albums	18
