= Common Chord (album) =

Studio album by David Grisman
- Released: 1993
- Recorded: 1993
- Genre: Bluegrass
- Length: 46:52
- Label: Rounder
- Producer: David Grisman

David Grisman chronology
Not for Kids Only (1993)	Common Chord (1993)	Tone Poems (1994)

Professional ratings
Review scores
Source	Rating
Allmusic	4/5 stars

Common Chord is an album by American musician David Grisman released in 1993. Blending different genres such as classical music, bluegrass, rock and jazz, this album includes (Jim Kerwin, Enrique Coria, Jerry Garcia, Mark O'Connor), but also classical violin virtuoso, Daniel Kobialka, Grisman's son Monroe on guitar, and many others.

== Track listing ==
1. "Ashokan Farewell" (Jay Ungar) – 5:18
2. "Blackberry Turnpike" – 5:01
3. "Barbara Allen" (Traditional) – 3:43
4. "Dark as a Dungeon" (Merle Travis) – 5:50
5. "Eighth of January" – 2:56
6. "Midnight on the Water" (Thomasson, Traditional) – 4:17
7. "Wayfaring Stranger" (Traditional) – 5:35
8. "Maiden's Prayer" (Bob Wills) 3:43
9. "The House Carpenter" (Traditional) – 3:53
10. "Boston Boy" (Traditional) – 2:39
11. "Down in the Willow Garden" (Traditional) – 4:09
12. "Omie Wise" (Traditional) – 4:31
13. "Ashokan Farewell (Reprise)" (Ungar) – 2:20

== Personnel ==
- David Grisman – mandolin, guitar
- Monroe Grisman – guitar
- Jerry Garcia – guitar, vocals
- Jim Kerwin – bass
- Norton Buffalo – harmonica
- Enrique Coria – guitar
- Daniel Kobialka – violin
- Lisa Kobialka – viola
- Rob Ickes – dobro
- Semyon Kobialka – cello
- Edgar Meyer – bass
- Scott Nygaard – guitar
- Tony Trischka – banjo
