= Danny Barnes (musician) =

American banjo player, singer, and composer

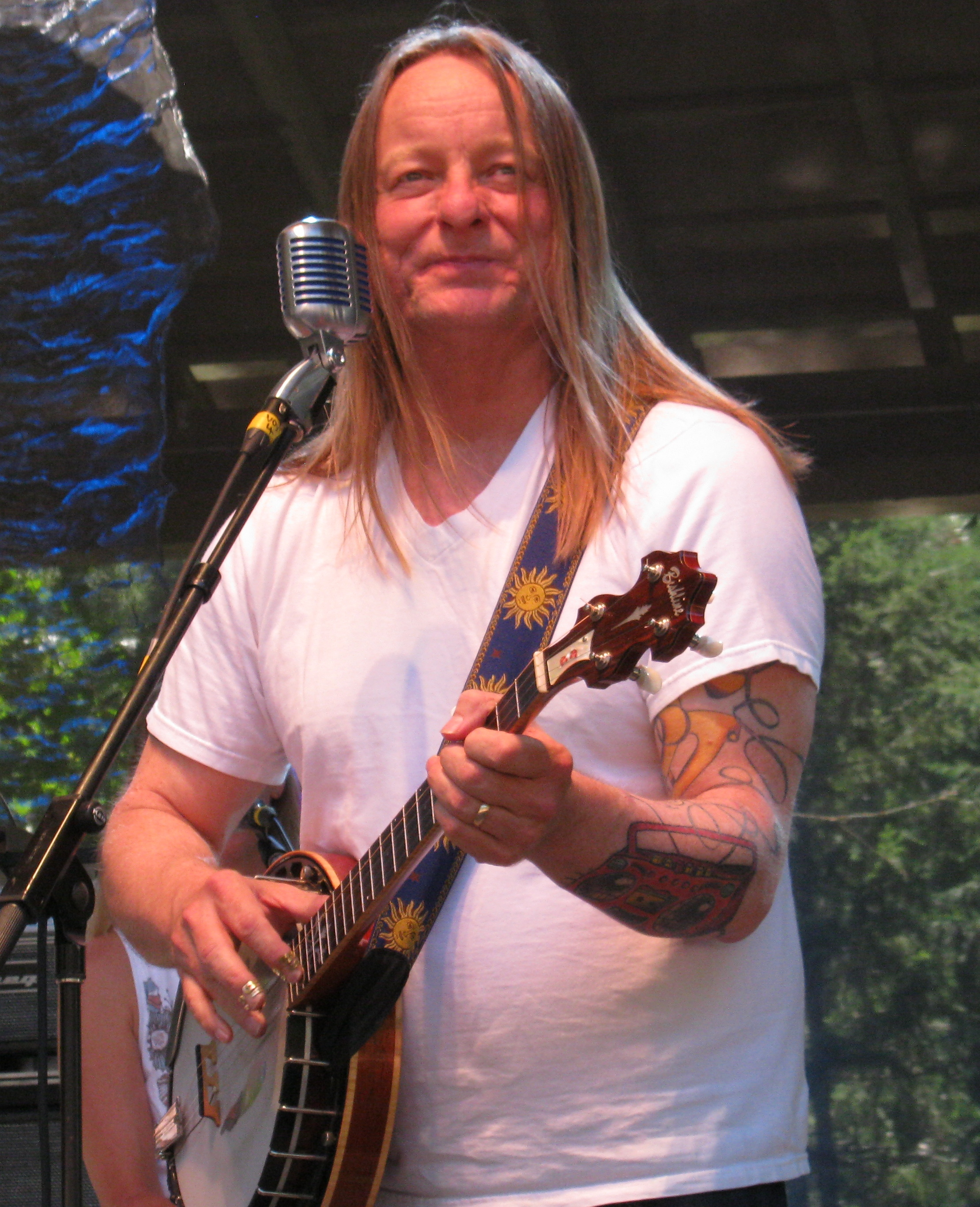
- Danny Barnes on stage at the Northwest String Summit on July 21, 2013.

Background information
- Born: December 21, 1961 (age 64); Temple, Texas, U.S.
- Genres: Country, jazz, punk, rock, folk
- Occupation: Musician
- Instrument: Banjo
- Years active: 1970s-present
- Labels: ATO, Sugar Hill, MapleMusic Recordings (Canada)
- Website: www.dannybarnes.com

Danny Barnes (born December 21, 1961) is an American banjo player, singer, and composer whose music is influenced by country, jazz, blues, punk, metal, and more. He has been described as a "banjo virtuoso" and is "widely acknowledged as one of the best banjo players in America." He was a founding member of the Austin trio the Bad Livers, with whom he toured and recorded extensively from 1990 to 2000. Since then, he has performed and recorded as a solo artist, as well as collaborating with Bill Frisell, Dave Matthews, Jeff Austin and other musicians. In 2013, Barnes and Max Brody formed the Test Apes. In September 2015, Barnes was awarded the Steve Martin Prize for Excellence in Banjo and Bluegrass, in recognition of his role as "one of bluegrass music’s most distinctive and innovative performers." Martin’s website said of Barnes’ work: "The raw and unpolished musical breadth of his compositions has propelled him across the industry today."

== Early life ==
Born in Temple, Texas and raised in Belton, Barnes was exposed to music at a young age: he recalls picking up a love of country and bluegrass from his father and grandmother, Delta blues from one brother and punk from another. He was inspired to learn to play the banjo after seeing Grandpa Jones and Stringbean in concert when he was ten. Seeing John Hartford on television and watching Hee Haw were also early influences. He attended the University of Texas and graduated with a degree in audio production in 1985.

== Career ==
In 1990, while living in Austin, Barnes formed the Bad Livers with bassist Mark Rubin and fiddler Ralph White. The band's 1992 debut album, Delusions of Banjer, was produced by Paul Leary of the Butthole Surfers and released on Quarterstick Records. It gained the band some attention in the alt-rock-country scene; they followed it up with another album for Quarterstick, Horses in the Mines, released in 1994. The band then released three albums on the Sugar Hill Records label. During his tenure with the Bad Livers, he was acclaimed as "a prodigiously talented picker, and a glorious singer" with "an ideal bluegrass voice." His songwriting, which "represents the merger of a technically superb musician with a powerful wordsmith" has also been the object of praise.

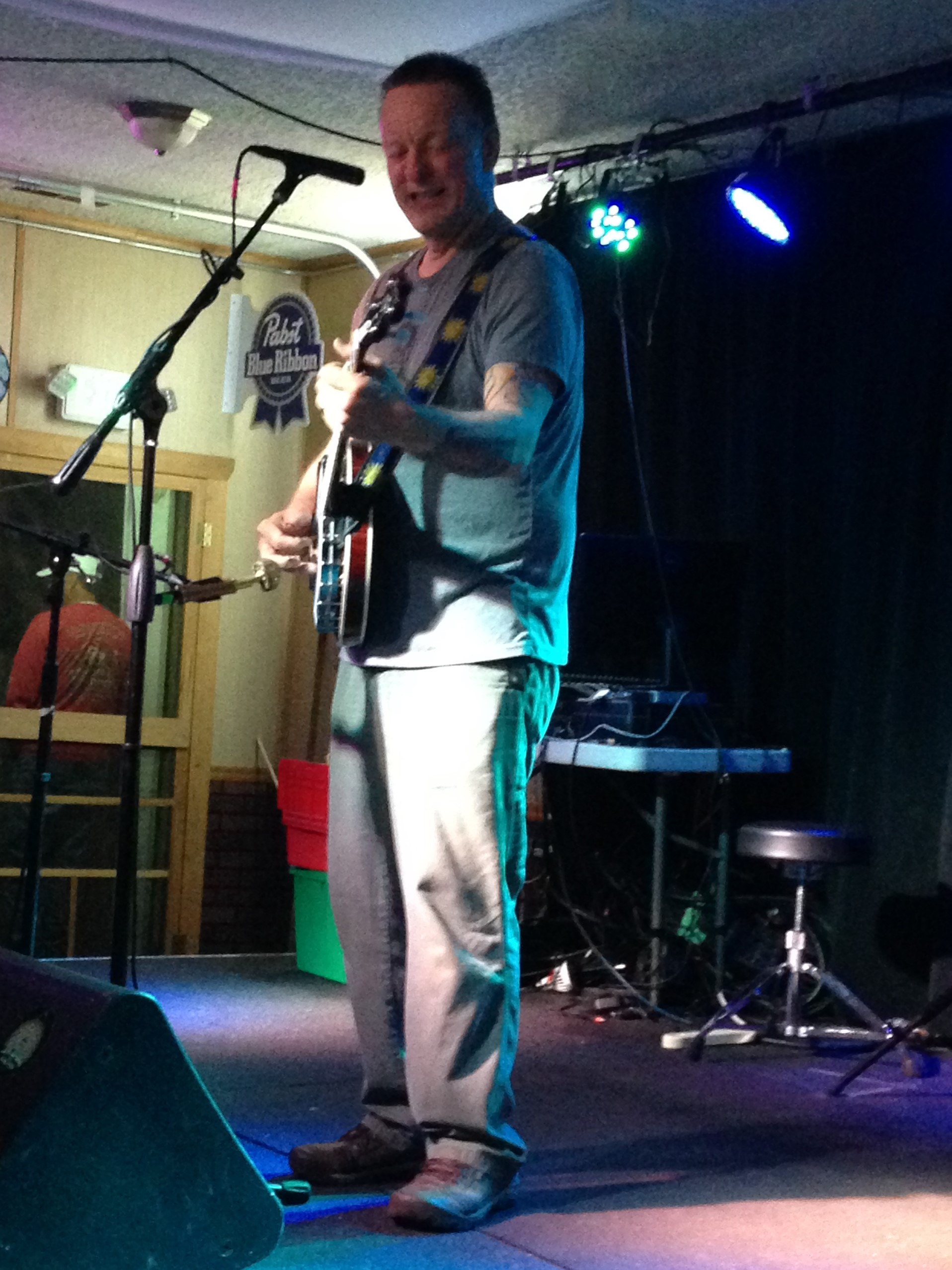
Danny Barnes on stage at Mackey's Hideout in McHenry, Illinois on October 1, 2016.

In 2000 Barnes, now living in Washington State, dissolved the Bad Livers and founded a new band, Danny Barnes & Thee Old Codgers, with bassist Keith Lowe and violinist Jon Parry. This band released only a single album, 2001's Things I Done Wrong, which was produced by avant-garde jazz composer and pianist Wayne Horvitz (a fellow Seattle resident). 2002 saw Barnes working with jazz guitarist Bill Frisell; Frisell was moving towards incorporating more "American"—country and bluegrass—influences into his playing, and he wanted Barnes to give him lessons in that direction. Their work together led to Barnes playing on Frisell's next album, The Willies; Barnes also toured with Frisell in support of the album.

Since moving to Washington, Barnes has also recorded several solo albums, which were self-released, and a duet effort. His 2003 album Dirt on the Angel, released on Terminus Records, featured Frisell, Chuck Leavell, Darol Anger, and Dirk Powell. In 2004 Barnes participated in Wayne Horvitz's Mylab band and released his second CD for Terminus Records, Get Myself Together.

On 9/21/2007, Danny joined Robert Earl Keen during an opening for the Dave Matthews Band in Houston. Danny joined DMB during their song "Bartender". He also joined DMB during their show at Smirnoff Music Centre in Dallas, and at their two shows at the Hollywood Bowl in California to conclude DMB's summer 2007 tour. He joined the band onstage once again for their three-night stand at The Gorge in 2009. He also joined them on stage on June 18, 2010 in Noblesville, Indiana.

In 2015, Barnes played and toured with the Jeff Austin Band. In September 2015, he was awarded the Steve Martin Prize for Excellence in Banjo and Bluegrass. In an interview with Texas Monthly, asked what he intended to do with the prize money, Barnes replied, "I'm going to invest it in my art."

In 2017 and 2018, Barnes toured with mandolinist Joe K. Walsh and guitarist Grant Gordy as the Danny Barnes Trio.

In 2019, he recorded with David Grisman and his son, Sam Grisman, for the project "Dawg Trio" which produced one album.

== Discography ==
=== Solo ===
- Man on Fire 2020 / ATO Records
- Stove Up 2017
- Got Myself Together (Ten Years Later) 2015 / Eight 30 Records (CD)
- Junior Sampled 2013 / Minner Bucket Records (CD)
- Ambient Works Vol. 1 2013 / Minner Bucket Records (CD)
- Shri 108 2013 / Minner Bucket Records (CD)
- Falling Hard/Money Moves Up 2013 / Minner Bucket Records (Vinyl 45)
- Poison 2011 / ATO Records (cassette)
- Angel 2011 / ATO Records (CD)
- Rocket 2011 / ATO Records (CD)
- Pizza Box 2009 / ATO Records (CD)
- Barnyard Electronics 2007 / Self-Released (CD)
- Get Myself Together 2005 / Terminus Records (CD)
- Livin' Large in a Little Bitty Room - Live! 2004 / Ironway Communications (CD)
- Dirt on the Angel 2003 / Terminus Records (CD)
- Minor Dings 2000 / Cavity Search (CD)
- Oft Mended Raiment 1999 / Minner Bucket (CD)

=== David Grisman's Dawg Trio ===
- Plays Tunes And Sings Songs 2019 / Acoustic Disc

=== Test Apes ===
- They Came In Peace 2018 / Self-Released
- "An Evening With"05/12/17-Portland, OR 2017 / Self-Released
- Live at the 16th Annual Northwest String Summit 2017 / Self-Released
- PEACOCK RADIO SESSIONS *NWSS 2017* 2017 / Self-Release
- Chicken Pie Vortex 2017 / Self-Released
- Remotes 2016 / Self-Released
- Live at the Funhouse Seattle 2016 / Self-Released
- Live at the Funhouse Vol. 2 2016 / Self-Released
- Mystery Tool 2015 / Self-Released
- Stranded on Earth 2015 / Self-Released
- Sea Monster Runway 2014 / Self-Released
- Test Apes 2014 / Self-Released

=== Bad Livers ===
- Blood and Mood 2000 / Sugar Hill
- Ridgetop Sessions 2000 / Lumpydisc
- Dust on the Bible reissue 1999 / Quarterstick
- Industry and Thrift 1998 / Sugar Hill
- Hogs on the Highway 1997 / Sugar Hill
- Horses in the Mines 1994 / Quarterstick
- Delusions of Banjer 1992 / Quarterstick
- The Golden Years 1992 / Quarterstick
- Lust For Life 1991 / Fist Puppet
- Dust on the Bible 1991 / Self-released

=== Danny Barnes & Thee Old Codgers ===
- Things I Done Wrong 2001 / Terminus Records (CD)

=== With Pete Krebs ===
- Duet For Clarinet and Goat 2001 / Cavity Search (CD)

=== Barnes, Hokkanen & Rubin ===
- Aka The Mad Cat Trio 1999 / Lumpydisc (CD)

=== As a guest musician ===
- Dave Matthews Band, Big Whiskey and the GrooGrux King 2009
- Greasy Beans, Busted Double Ought
- Wayne Horvitz/Tucker Martine, Mylab 2004 / Terminus
- Bill Frisell, The Willies 2002 / Nonesuch
- Jackstraw, Jackstraw 2002 / Self-released
- Greasy Beans, Real Live Music Double Ought
- Gully Jumpers, Peas & Corn
- Steve James, Art and Grit 1996 / Antone's Records
- Steve James, American Primitive 1994 / Antone's Records
