= Stephane Grappelli/David Grisman Live =

Live album by David Grisman, Stephane Grappelli
- Released: 1981
- Genres: Americana, newgrass, gypsy jazz
- Label: Warner Bros.
- Producer: David Grisman

David Grisman chronology
Mondo Mando (1981)	Stephane Grappelli/David Grisman Live (1981)	Here Today (1982)

Professional ratings
Review scores
Source	Rating
Allmusic	3/5 stars

Stephane Grappelli/David Grisman Live is album by musicians David Grisman and Stephane Grappelli, released in 1981. It was recorded live on September 20, 1979 at Berklee center, Boston except for "Satin Doll", which was recorded on September 7, 1979 at the Great American Music Hall, San Francisco.

== Track listing ==
1. Shine (Brown, Dabney, Mack) 5:18
2. Pent-Up House (Rollins) 4:38
3. Misty (Burke, Garner) 6:20
4. Sweet Georgia Brown (Bernie, Pinkard, Casey) 5:13
5. Tiger Rag (Hold That Tiger) (DeCosta, Edwards) 4:56
6. Satin Doll (Ellington, Mercer, Strayhorn) 7:36
7. Swing '42 (Reinhardt) 4:00
8. Medley: Tzigani / Fisztorza / Fulginiti (Grisman) 5:42

== Personnel ==
- David Grisman – mandolin
- Stephane Grappelli - violin
- Mark O'Connor - guitar, violin
- Rob Wasserman - bass
- Mike Marshall - guitar, mandolin
- Tiny Moore - electric mandolin

== Credits ==
- Producer—David Grisman
- Executive Producer—Craig Miller
- Engineering—Bill Wolf
- Mastering—Greg Fulginiti
