= David Grisman's Acoustic Christmas =

Studio album by David Grisman
- Released: 1983
- Genre: Christmas, newgrass, jazz
- Length: 39:09
- Label: Rounder
- Producer: David Grisman

David Grisman chronology
| Here Today (1982) | David Grisman's Acoustic Christmas (1983) | Dawg Jazz/Dawg Grass (1983) |

Professional ratings
Review scores
| Source | Rating |
|---|---|
| Allmusic | 3.5/5 stars |

David Grisman's Acoustic Christmas is an album by American musician David Grisman, released in 1983.

== Track listing ==
1. "What Child Is This?" (William Chatterton Dix, Traditional) – 1:01
2. "Santa Claus Is Coming to Town" (J. Fred Coots, Haven Gillespie) – 3:37
3. "Respighi: Ancient Aires and Dances" – 2:32
4. "The Christmas Song" (Mel Tormé, Robert Wells) – 4:07
5. "God Rest Ye Merry Gentlemen" (Traditional) – 6:51
6. "We Wish You a Merry Christmas" (Traditional) – 0:41
7. "White Christmas" (Irving Berlin) – 4:16
8. "The Flower Carol" (Traditional, Wenchels) – 1:27
9. "Winter Wonderland" (Felix Bernard, Richard B. Smith) – 3:44
10. "Silent Night" (Josef Mohr, Franz Xaver Gruber) – 3:42
11. "Auld Lang Syne" (Burns, Traditional) – 4:04

== Personnel ==
- David Grisman – mandolin, mandola
- Darol Anger – fiddle, cello, Violectra
- Béla Fleck – banjo, 5-string banjo
- Mike Marshall – guitar, mandolin, mandola, mandocello
- Martin Taylor – guitar
- Rob Wasserman – bass
- Pamela Abramson – piano
- John Stafford – saxophone
- Tony Burille – recorder, tenor Crumhorn
- Lyn Elder – Hurdygurdy, bass recorder, Crumhorn
- Joanna Young – Crumhorn, alto recorder
- Bob Gurland – trumpet

Production notes:

- David Grisman – producer, mixing
- Phil Sawyer – engineer
- Bob Shumaker – engineer
- Greg Fulginiti – mastering
- Gail Evenari – cover design
- Craig Miller – production assistant
- Jon Sievert – photography
