= Satisfied (David Grisman and John Sebastian album) =

Studio album by David Grisman, John Sebastian
- Released: 2007
- Genre: Folk music
- Label: Acoustic Disc
- Producer: David Grisman, John Sebastian

David Grisman chronology
The Living Room Sessions (2007)	Satisfied (2007)	Live at the Boarding House (2008)

Satisfied is an album by American musicians David Grisman and John Sebastian, released in 2007. The two met 41 years before this recording and were part of The Even Dozen Jug Band in 1964. The album offers a collection of traditional folk songs, mixed with originals by both Sebastian and Grisman.

== Reception ==
Professional ratings
Review scores
Source	Rating
Allmusic	3.5/5 stars
Mojo	3/5 stars
The Music Box	3/5 stars

Writing for Allmusic, critic Ronnie D. Lankford, Jr. wrote of the album, "one gains the impression of two friends jamming just for the fun of it, a back-porch authenticity re-created in the studio... As enjoyable as it is to listen to two old friends get together and jam, though, Satisfied is too laid-back, with a number of so-so songs mixed in with classics, and some songs overstay their welcome. The entire project would have been strengthened by a better batch of songs and tighter performances. Fans of Sebastian and Grisman will undoubtedly want to tune in to see what these two old pros have been up to, even if Satisfied does have the sound and feel of a home recording.." Douglas Heselgrave of The Music Box wrote a similar review, writing "In the end, Satisfied is nothing more than a comfortable disc. Like an old armchair that has long since changed its contours to fit the body of the person who always sits in it, Satisfied is well worn and predictable. It is benign rather than challenging. This is not necessarily a bad thing, and many people certainly will enjoy the outing. It’s just that, ultimately, Satisfied — much as its title suggests — says more about how Sebastian and Grisman feel about life, the world, and their place within it than it does about the experience of the listeners who hear it.

== Track listing ==
1. "I'm Satisfied" (Mississippi John Hurt) 2:41
2. "Strings of Your Heart" (Sebastian) 3:21
3. "EMD" (Grisman) 4:02
4. "Deep Purple" (Peter De Rose, Mitchell Parish) 4:39
5. "John Henry" (Traditional) 5:03
6. "Walk Right Back" (Sonny Curtis) 4:47
7. "Passing Fantasy" (Gary Nicholson, Sebastian) 4:10
8. "Coffee Blues" (Mississippi John Hurt) 2:53
9. "Dawg's Waltz" (Grisman) 4:21
10. "Lonely One in This Town" (Traditional) 3:58
11. "It's Not Time Now" (Sebastian, Zal Yanovsky) 3:20
12. "Harmandola Blues" (Grisman, Sebastian) 2:37
13. "Coconut Grove" (Sebastian, Zal Yanovsky) 5:19
14. "Jug Band Waltz" (Will Shade) 3:56

== Personnel ==
- John Sebastian – vocals, guitar, whistle, harmonica
- David Grisman – vocals, mandolin, mandola
