= Go to Sea Once More =

Sea shanty

"Go to Sea Once More" or "Off to Sea" (Roud 644) is a sea shanty and folk song originating from the English Merchant Navy, likely from the period of 1700 - 1900.

== Overview ==
The song is a cautionary tale, telling the story of a sailor who, after completing his voyage and receiving his pay, gets very drunk and has all his clothing and hard-earned money stolen by a prostitute. Though he has sworn to "go to sea no more", his situation forces him to accept a position on a whaling ship bound for the Arctic Sea, where he subsequently endures terrible conditions such as the freezing cold. The sailor's name varies slightly in the different versions of the song, though typically he is named Jack Tarr, Jack Sprat, or Jack Wrack. The song urges sailors to avoid strong drink and the hard lifestyle that comes with a seafaring life, and to "get married instead".

== Variant versions ==
As with most traditional folk songs, different variations developed over the years. The Wolfe Tones released a version in 1970 under the title of "The Holy Ground" with modified melody and lyrics, which holds true to the themes of the original song. Irish artists such as Ryan's Fancy and The Dubliners recorded very faithful versions with the slightly modified title "Go to Sea No More", while other versions, such as the one recorded in the late 1960s by the American folk-rock band The Byrds on their Ballad of Easy Rider album, use the title "Jack Tarr the Sailor" while telling the same tale. A bluegrass version by Jerry Garcia and David Grisman was released in 1996 on their album Shady Grove under the title "Off to Sea Once More". More recently The Longest Johns released a version under the title "Off To Sea" from their 2018 album Between Wind and Water.
