= David Grisman Quintet =

American bluegrass/jazz band

- David Grisman Quintet performing in 2008

Background information
- Origin: San Francisco, California, US
- Years active: 1975–present
- Labels: Pastels Records, A&M, Warner Bros. Records, Acoustic Disc
- Members: David Grisman; Grant Gordy; George Marsh; Matt Eakle; Jim Kerwin
- Past members: Tony Rice; Todd Philips; Darol Anger; Mike Marshall; Jon Sholle; Enrique Coria; Joe Craven; Mark O'Connor; John Carlini; Rick Montgomery; Bill Amatneek; Rob Wasserman; Joe Carroll

The David Grisman Quintet is a self-styled alternative bluegrass/acoustic jazz band founded by David Grisman in 1975 in San Francisco, California, US. The quintet draws from genres including Bill Monroe's bluegrass legacy and Django Reinhardt's 1930s swing. Since its formation, the Quintet's members have included guitarist Tony Rice and multiinstrumentalists Mark O'Connor, Mike Marshall, Darol Anger and Jon Sholle. The Quintet has performed and recorded with guests such as violinist Stephane Grapelli, and remains active. The National Public Radio program Car Talk uses the band's instrumental "Dawggy Mountain Breakdown" as its theme music.

== Discography ==
The following albums have been released by the David Grisman Quintet:

- The David Grisman Quintet - 1977
- Hot Dawg - 1978
- Quintet '80 - 1980
- Mondo Mando - 1981
- Dawg '90 - 1990
- Dawgwood - 1993
- Dawganova - 1995
- DGQ-20 - 1996
- Dawgnation - 2002
- Dawg's Groove - 2006
