= Tone Poems 2 =

Studio album by David Grisman, Martin Taylor
- Released: October 31, 1995
- Recorded: January 1995
- Studio: Dawg Studios
- Genre: Jazz
- Length: 64:24
- Label: Acoustic Disc
- Producer: David Grisman

David Grisman, Martin Taylor chronology
| Tone Poems 2 (1995) | I'm Beginning to See the Light (1999) |

David Grisman chronology
| Songs of Our Fathers (1995) | Tone Poems 2 (1995) | DGQ-20 (1996) |

Professional ratings
Review scores
| Source | Rating |
|---|---|
| AllMusic | 4.5/5 stars |

Tone Poems 2 is an album by American mandolinist David Grisman and British guitarist Martin Taylor that was released in 1995 by Grisman's label, Acoustic Music. It is a sequel to Tone Poems, his collaboration with bluegrass guitarist Tony Rice. This is a jazz-oriented recording on which Grisman and Taylor play a variety of vintage, fretted, acoustic instruments. They use 41 guitars, mandolins, mandolas, mandocellos, and tenor guitars.

== Track listing ==
1. "Swanee" (George Gershwin, Irving Caesar) – 4:22
2. "Teasin' the Frets" (Nick Lucas) – 1:53
3. "It Had to Be You" (Isham Jones, Gus Kahn) – 3:15
4. "Please" (Ralph Rainger, Leo Robin) – 3:14
5. "Mood Indigo" (Duke Ellington, Barney Bigard, Irving Mills) – 3:09
6. "Anything Goes" (Cole Porter) – 2:06
7. "Blue Moon" (Richard Rodgers, Lorenz Hart) – 4:24
8. "Lulu's Back In Town" (Harry Warren, Al Dubin) – 2:59
9. "Tears" (Stéphane Grappelli, Django Reinhardt) – 3:10
10. "Jeepers Creepers" (Warren, Johnny Mercer) – 2:57
11. "Over the Rainbow" (Harold Arlen, E. Y. Harburg) – 4:18
12. "Musette for a Magpie" (Martin Taylor) – 3:16
13. "Mairzy Doats" (Milton Drake, Al Hoffman, and Jerry Livingston) – 2:16
14. "Bésame Mucho" (Consuelo Velázquez, Sunny Skylar) – 4:41
15. "Unforgettable" (Irving Gordon) – 3:07
16. "Here's That Rainy Day" (Jimmy Van Heusen, Johnny Burke) – 3:26
17. "My Romance" (Rodgers, Hart) – 4:02
18. "Out of Nowhere" (Johnny Green, Edward Heyman) – 3:44
19. "Crystal Silence" (Chick Corea, Neville Potter) – 3:38

== Personnel ==
- David Grisman – mandolin, mandola, mandocello, guitar, tenor guitar
- Martin Taylor – guitar
