= Early Dawg =

Live album by David Grisman
- Released: 1980
- Recorded: March 1966, June 1973
- Genre: Progressive bluegrass, jazz
- Label: Sugar Hill
- Producer: David Grisman

David Grisman chronology
Hot Dawg (1978)	Early Dawg (1980)	Quintet '80 (1980)

Professional ratings
Review scores
Source	Rating
Allmusic	4/5 stars

Early Dawg is a live album by American mandolinist David Grisman, released in 1980. With Del McCoury on guitar and vocals, Jerry McCoury on bass, Bill Keith on banjo plus other well-known musicians, Grisman offers a mix of traditional songs, compositions by Bill Monroe and his own contributions, mainly of bluegrass and progressive bluegrass style. These are some of Grisman's earliest solo recordings from March 1966, except track 16 with Frank Wakefield was recorded in June 1973. The album was released on Sugar Hill.

== Track listing ==
All tracks composed by David Grisman except where indicated

1. "Fanny Hill"
2. "Sugar Hill Ramble"
3. "Little Maggie" (Traditional)
4. "Blue Grass Twist" (Bill Monroe)
5. "Shenandoah Breakdown" (Bill Monroe)
6. "Opus 57"
7. "The Prisoner's Song" (Guy Massey)
8. "John Henry" (Traditional)
9. "Rawhide" (Bill Monroe)
10. "Little Sadie" (Traditional)
11. "Dark Hollow" (Bill Browning)
12. "Dear Old Dixie" (Lester Flatt, Earl Scruggs)
13. "Opus 38"
14. "I Wonder Where You Are Tonight" (Johnny Bond)
15. "Caravan" (Duke Ellington)
16. "Black Mountain Rag" (Traditional)

== Personnel ==
- David Grisman – mandolin, baritone vocal (14)
- Del McCoury – guitar, vocals
- Artie Rose – guitar (2, 6, 10, 13, 15)
- Bill Keith – banjo (2, 6, 10, 15)
- Winnie Winston – banjo
- Frank Wakefield – mandolin (16)
- Jerry McCoury – bass
