= Hot Dawg =

1978 studio album by David Grisman

Studio album by David Grisman Quintet
- Released: 1978
- Studio: His Masters Wheels (San Francisco); 1750 Arch Street, San Francisco
- Genre: Jazz, bluegrass
- Length: 39:56
- Label: A&M-Horizon
- Producer: David Grisman

David Grisman chronology
The David Grisman Quintet (1977)	Hot Dawg (1978)	Early Dawg (1980)

David Grisman Quintet chronology
The David Grisman Quintet (1977)	Hot Dawg (1978)	Quintet '80 (1980)

Hot Dawg is an album by American musician David Grisman, released in 1978.

== Critical reception ==
Professional ratings
Review scores
Source	Rating
AllMusic	4.5/5 stars
DownBeat	4.5/5 stars

The Globe and Mail wrote: "One of Grisman's tunes is 'Dawgology', the title (more than the rather boppish theme) alluding to Reinhardt's 'Djangology'. And Grisman's backup, appropriately an acoustic stringband, recalls the general virtuosity and amiable swing of its Parisian counterpart."

== Track listing ==
1. "Dawg's Bull" (David Grisman) – 4:14
2. "Devlin'" (Tony Rice) – 5:06
3. "Minor Swing" (Stephane Grappelli, Django Reinhardt) – 3:36
4. "Dawgology" (Grisman, Richard Greene) – 7:11
5. "Neon Tetra" (Rice) – 6:29
6. "Janice" (Grisman) – 3:57
7. "Dawg-Ola" (Grisman) – 3:56
8. "16/16" (Grisman) – 5:27

== Chart positions ==
Year	Chart	Position
1979	Billboard Jazz Albums	14
1979	Australia Kent Music Report	93

== Personnel ==
- David Grisman – mandolin
- Tony Rice – guitar, + violin (6)
- Darol Anger – violin (1, 2, 4, 6, 7), violectra (5)
- Mike Marshall – mandolin (3, 4, 8)
- Todd Phillips – bass (1, 5)

with

- Eddie Gómez – bass (3, 4, 8)
- Stéphane Grappelli – violin (3, 8)
- Buell Neidlinger – bass (2, 7)
- Bill Amatneek – bass (6)

Production

- David Grisman – producer
- Bill Wolf – engineer, mixing, mastering
- Bob Shumaker – engineer
- Bob McLeod – mastering
- Mark Hanauer – photography
- Brian Davis – illustrations
- Chuck Beeson – design
- Roland Young – art direction

(1, 2, 4–7) recorded at His Masters Wheels Studio by Bill Wolf, (3, 8) recorded of 1750 Arch Street Studios by Bob Shumaker
