= Here Today (David Grisman album) =

1983 bluegrass studio album

Studio album by David Grisman, Emory Gordy Jr., Herb Pedersen, Jim Buchanan, Vince Gill
- Released: 1983
- Recorded: 1982
- Genre: Americana, newgrass, jazz
- Length: 32:21
- Label: Rounder
- Producer: David Grisman, Herb Pedersen

David Grisman chronology
Mondo Mando (1981)	Here Today (1983)	David Grisman's Acoustic Christmas (1983)

Professional ratings
Review scores
Source	Rating
Allmusic	2/5 stars

Here Today is a bluegrass album by five American musicians David Grisman, Emory Gordy Jr., Herb Pedersen, Jim Buchanan and Vince Gill, released in 1983 on Rounder Records. This was the only album this group recorded and each continued separate careers in bluegrass, newgrass, and country music.

== Track listing ==
1. "I'll Love Nobody But You" (Jesse McReynolds) – 2:04
2. "Once More" (Dusty Owens) – 2:52
3. "Foggy Mountain Chimes" (Earl Scruggs) – 2:27
4. "The Children Are Crying" (Earl Taylor) – 2:37
5. "Hot Corn, Cold Corn" (D. Ackerman, Lester Flatt, Scruggs) – 2:32
6. "Lonesome River" (Carter Stanley, Ralph Stanley) – 4:07
7. "My Walking Shoes" (Jimmy Martin, Paul Williams) – 2:14
8. "Love and Wealth" (Ira Louvin, Charlie Louvin) – 2:33
9. "Billy in the Low Ground" (Traditional) – 2:32
10. "Making Plans" (Russell Morrison) – 3:57
11. "Sweet Little Miss Blue Eyes" (Helm Taylor) – 1:55
12. "Going up Home to Live in Green Pastures" (Avril Gearheart, Ralph Stanley) – 2:51

== Personnel ==
- David Grisman – mandolin, vocals
- Jim Buchanan – fiddle, vocals
- Vince Gill – guitar, vocals
- Emory Gordy, Jr. – bass, vocals
- Herb Pedersen – banjo, guitar, Vocals, 5-string Banjo

Production notes:

- David Grisman – producer
- Herb Pedersen – producer
- John Haeny – engineer
- Greg Fulginiti - original mastering
- Dr. Toby Mountain – mastering
- Neil V. Rosenberg – liner notes
- Jon Sievert – photography
- Craig Miller – production coordination
