= Old & In the Gray =

Studio album by Old & In the Way
- Released: October 1, 2002
- Genre: Bluegrass, folk
- Label: Acoustic Disc
- Producer: David Grisman

Old & In the Way chronology
| Breakdown (1997) | Old & In the Gray (2002) | Live at the Boarding House (2008) |

David Grisman chronology
| Traversata (2001) | Old & In the Gray (2002) | Dawgnation (2002) |

Old & In the Gray is a bluegrass album released in 2002 by the surviving members of the band Old & In the Way – Peter Rowan (guitar), David Grisman (mandolin), and Vassar Clements (fiddle). Banjoist Jerry Garcia and bassist John Kahn, both of whom were deceased, were replaced by Herb Pedersen and Bryn Bright, respectively.

== Critical reception ==
Professional ratings
Review scores
| Source | Rating |
|---|---|
| Allmusic | 4.5/5 stars |
| The Music Box | 4/5 stars |

On AllMusic, Ken Dryden said, "The music stretches boundaries as much as the earlier band, with a mix of vintage bluegrass and country classics... along with more modern pieces... It's obvious that the musicians had a lot of fun trading vocals and instrumental licks as well as harmonizing throughout the date..."

In The Music Box, John Metzger wrote, "Renamed Old & In the Gray, the group at long last has recorded a studio album, and the result is well worth the wait. Of the fourteen tracks on its self-titled debut, there's nary a dud in the lot as the ensemble traverses a variety of songs, cutting a wide swath through bluegrass, country, and rock... Throughout the album, tight harmonies and exquisite instrumentation abound, all of which is put forth with genuine aplomb."

== Track listing ==
1. "Good Old Boys" (John Hartford) – 4:57
2. "Pancho and Lefty" (Townes Van Zandt) – 5:14
3. "Meadow Green" (Peter Rowan) – 2:49
4. "The Flood" (Carter Stanley) – 4:06
5. "When the Springtime Comes Again" (A. P. Carter) – 3:14
6. "Barefoot Nellie" (Don Reno, Jim Davis) – 2:28
7. "Childish Love" (Ira Louvin) – 3:21
8. "Victim to the Tomb" (John Duffey) – 4:28
9. "Vassar's Fiddle Rag" (Vassar Clements) – 3:10
10. "Two Little Boys" (Charlie Waller, John Duffey) – 3:57
11. "On the Old Kentucky Shore" (Bill Monroe) – 4:17
12. "Honky Tonk Women" (Keith Richards, Mick Jagger) – 2:35
13. "Let Those Brown Eyes Smile at Me" (Rusty Nail) – 2:35
14. "Rainmaker" (Peter Rowan) – 3:56

== Personnel ==
Musicians

- David Grisman – mandolin, vocals
- Peter Rowan – guitar, vocals
- Herb Pedersen – banjo, guitar, vocals
- Vassar Clements – fiddle
- Bryn Bright – double bass

Production

- Produced by David Grisman
- Executive producer: Craig Miller
- Production assistance: Rob Bleetstein
- Recording engineer: Larry Cummings
- Mixing: Larry Cummings, David Grisman
- Mastering: Paul Stubblebine
- Cover art: Ivan Artucovich

== Chart performance ==
| Chart (2002) | Peak position |
|---|---|
| U.S. Billboard Top Bluegrass Albums | 9 |
| U.S. Billboard Top Country Albums | 72 |
