= I'm Beginning to See the Light (David Grisman and Martin Taylor album) =

Studio album by David Grisman, Martin Taylor
- Released: June 2, 1999
- Studio: Dawg Studios
- Genre: Jazz
- Length: 66:14
- Label: Acoustic Disc
- Producer: David Grisman, Martin Taylor

David Grisman, Martin Taylor chronology
Tone Poems 2 (1995)	I'm Beginning to See the Light (1999)

David Grisman chronology
Dawg Duos (1999)	I'm Beginning to See the Light (1999)	Tone Poems 3 (2000)

I'm Beginning to See the Light is an acoustic jazz album by American mandolinist David Grisman, British guitarist Martin Taylor, George Marsh, and Jim Kerwin.

== Track listing ==
1. I'm Beginning to See the Light (Duke Ellington, Don George, Johnny Hodges, Harry James) – 4:00
2. Autumn Leaves (Joseph Kosma, Johnny Mercer, Jacques Prévert) – 4:22
3. Do You Know What It Means (To Miss New Orleans?) (Louis Alter, Eddie DeLange) – 5:11
4. East of the Sun (Brooks Bowman) – 4:43
5. Autumn in New York (Vernon Duke) – 4:40
6. Makin' Whoopee (Walter Donaldson, Gus Kahn) – 5:11
7. Lover Man (Jimmy Davis, Roger Ramirez, Jimmy Sherman) – 5:27
8. Exactly Like You (Jimmy McHugh, Dorothy Fields) – 4:02
9. Willow Weep for Me (Ann Ronell) – 7:05
10. A Foggy Day (George Gershwin, Ira Gershwin) – 4:19
11. Cheek to Cheek (Irving Berlin) – 5:09
12. Bewitched, Bothered and Bewildered (Richard Rodgers, Lorenz Hart) – 5:10

== Personnel ==
- David Grisman – mandolin, mandola, mandocello, guitar, tenor guitar
- Martin Taylor – guitar
- Jim Kerwin – double bass
- George Marsh – drums
