= Quintet '80 =

Studio album by David Grisman Quintet
- Released: 1980
- Recorded: 1750 Arch Studios
- Genre: Americana, progressive bluegrass, jazz
- Label: Warner Bros.
- Producer: David Grisman

David Grisman chronology
Early Dawg (1980)	Quintet '80 (1980)	Mondo Mando (1981)

David Grisman Quintet chronology
Early Dawg (1980)	Quintet '80 (1980)	Mondo Mando (1981)

Professional ratings
Review scores
Source	Rating
Allmusic	2/5 stars

Quintet '80 is an album by American musician David Grisman, released in 1980.

== Track listing ==
1. "Dawgma"
2. "Bow Wow"
3. "Barkley's Bug"
4. "Sea Of Cortez"
5. "Naima" (John Coltrane)
6. "Mugavero" (John Carlini)
7. "Dawgmatism"
8. "Thailand"

== Personnel ==
- David Grisman – mandolin
- Mark O'Connor – guitar
- Darol Anger – violin, cello, violectra, violin arrangement of "Sea of Cortez"
- Rob Wasserman – bass
- Mike Marshall – guitar, mandolin, violin

with

- Joan Jeanrenaud – cello

Production notes:

- David Grisman - producer, arranger
- Bill Wolf - engineer, mixing
- Greg Fulginiti - mastering
- Suzanne Phister - art direction, design
- Richard Escasany - art direction, design

== Chart positions ==
Year	Chart	Position
1980	Billboard Jazz Albums	15
1980	The Billboard 200	152
