= Life of Sorrow =

Studio album by David Grisman
- Released: 2003
- Studio: Dawg Studios, Atwell Studios, BayView Studios, Cowboy Arms, Petrucci
- Genre: Bluegrass
- Length: 60:08
- Label: Acoustic Disc
- Producer: David Grisman

David Grisman chronology
Dawgnation (2002)	Life of Sorrow (2003)	Hold On, We're Strummin' (2003)

Professional ratings
Review scores
Source	Rating
Allmusic	4.5/5 stars
The Music Box	4/5 stars

Life of Sorrow is an album by American mandolinist David Grisman. He offers a collection of bluegrass songs by Lester Flatt, Ralph Stanley, and others.

== Track listing ==
No.	Title	Writer(s)	Length
1.	"A Life Of Sorrow" (with Nashville Bluegrass Band)	Carter Stanley	3:20
2.	"Doin' My Time" (with John Hartford)	Jimmie Skinner	4:45
3.	"We Can't Be Darlings Anymore" (with Del McCoury Band)	Lester Flatt, Curly Seckler	3:03
4.	"When You And I Were Young Maggie" (with Mac Wiseman)	James Butterfield, George Johnson	5:14
5.	"All The Good Times Are Past And Gone" (with Ralph Stanley & the Clinch Mountain Boys)	A.P. Carter	3:26
6.	"Tragic Romance" (with Alan O'Bryant)	Grandpa Jones	3:35
7.	"Seven Year Blues" (with Mac Wiseman)	Eddie Hill, I. Louvin, C. Louvin	3:53
8.	"You're The Girl Of My Dreams" (with Mac Wiseman)	Mac Wiseman	2:23
9.	"Unwanted Love" (with Del McCoury Band)	Don Reno, Red Smiley, Fred Swift	2:56
10.	"Man Of Constant Sorrow" (with Ralph Stanley)	Carter Stanley	3:57
11.	"Tennessee Waltz" (with Del McCoury)	Redd Stewart, Pee Wee King	3:07
12.	"Bury Me Under The Weeping Willow" (with Ralph Rinzler)	traditional	4:21
13.	"Pretty Saro" (with John Nagy)	traditional	3:06
14.	"Cabin Of Love" (with Del McCoury Band)	Birch Monroe	2:47
15.	"Farther Along" (with Bryan Bowers)	traditional	10:06

== Personnel ==
- David Grisman – mandolin, vocals
- Ralph Rinzler – mandolin
- Ronnie McCoury – mandolin, vocal
- Pat Enright – guitar, vocals
- John Nagy – guitar, vocals
- Del McCoury – guitar
- Artie Rose – guitar
- Ralph Stanley II – guitar
- Mac Wiseman – guitar, vocals
- Herb Pedersen – banjo, guitar, vocals
- John Hartford – banjo, vocals
- Ralph Stanley – banjo, vocals
- Rob McCoury – banjo
- Jason Carter – violin
- Stuart Duncan – violin
- James Price – violin
- Mike Bub – bass
- Jackie Cook – bass, vocals
- Jim Kerwin – bass
- Harriet Rose – bass
