= Mandolin Abstractions =

Live album by David Grisman, Andy Statman
- Released: 1983
- Genre: Americana, newgrass, jazz
- Label: Rounder
- Producer: David Grisman

David Grisman, Andy Statman chronology
Mandolin Abstractions (1983)	Songs of Our Fathers (1995)

David Grisman chronology
Dawg Jazz/Dawg Grass (1983)	Mandolin Abstractions (1983)	Acousticity (1984)

Professional ratings
Review scores
Source	Rating
Allmusic	3/5 stars

Mandolin Abstractions is an album by American musicians David Grisman and Andy Statman, released in 1983.

Additional tracks on the CD reissue included "Japanese Sunrise", "Blackie and Sunburst", "Crosby, Stills and Nash", "Song of the Dawg" and "Ballad of Ouzo".

== Track listing ==
All compositions by David Grisman and Andy Statman unless otherwise noted.

1. "Overture" – 7:29
2. "Apassionata" – 3:46
3. "Japanese Sunrise" – 8:29
4. "Two White Boys Watching James Brown at the Apollo" – 2:26
5. "Blackie and Sunburst" – 4:31
6. "Crosby, Stills and Nash" – 2:05
7. "Journey to the Center of Twang" – 5:01
8. "Ode to Jim McReynolds" – 2:29
9. "March of the Mandolas, Pt. 1" – 7:31
10. "March of the Mandolas, Pt. 2" – 9:28
11. "Song of the Dawg" (Grisman) – 2:35
12. "Ballade of Ouzo" (Statman) – 5:32
13. "'Til We Meet Again" – 3:28

== Personnel ==
- David Grisman – mandolin, mandola
- Andy Statman – mandolin, mandola, mandocello

Production notes:

- David Grisman – producer
- Howard Johnston – engineer, mixing
- Craig Miller – engineer, mixing
- Greg Fulginiti - original mastering
- Tom Coyne – mastering
- Ted Sharpe – design
- Arthur Stern – cover art
