= The Living Room Sessions (David Grisman, Frank Vignola, Robin Nolan and Michael Papillo album) =

2007 album

Studio album by David Grisman, Frank Vignola, Robin Nolan, Michael Papillo
- Released: October 16, 2007
- Genre: Jazz
- Label: Acoustic Disc
- Producer: David Grisman

David Grisman chronology
New Shabbos Waltz (2006)	The Living Room Sessions (2007)	Satisfied (2007)

The Living Room Sessions, is an album by American jazz musicians David Grisman, Frank Vignola, Robin Nolan and Michael Papillo.

== Track listing ==
1. Claire de Lune 6:16
2. Black Orpheus 5:38
3. September Song 4:07
4. Sway With Me 8:20
5. Dawg Waltz 6:57
6. Swing Gitan 5:35
7. Tears 6:54
8. Premier Guitar 7:22
9. Autumn Leaves

== Personnel ==
- David Grisman - mandolin
- Frank Vignola - guitar
- Robin Nolan - guitar
- Michael Papillo - bass
