= Home Is Where the Heart Is (David Grisman album) =

Studio album by David Grisman
- Released: 1988
- Recorded: 1988
- Genre: Bluegrass
- Length: 71:24
- Label: Rounder
- Producer: David Grisman

David Grisman chronology
| Svingin' with Svend (1987) | Home Is Where the Heart Is (1988) | Dawg '90 (1990) |

Professional ratings
Review scores
| Source | Rating |
|---|---|
| Allmusic | 3/5 stars |

Home Is Where the Heart Is is an album by American musician David Grisman released in 1987. After the 1987 jazz album, Svingin' with Svend, this record contains more traditional bluegrass and includes such stars of the genre as Doc Watson, Tony Rice, J.D. Crowe and others.

== Track listing ==
1. "True Life Blues" (Bill Monroe) – 2:28
2. "Down in the Willow Garden" (Traditional) – 4:30
3. "My Long Journey Home" (Monroe) – 2:25
4. "Little Willie" (Traditional) – 2:56
5. "Highway of Sorrow" (Monroe, Pyle) – 3:26
6. "Sophronie" (Delmore. (Mullins) – 3:00
7. "My Aching Heart" (Sloan) – 2:19
8. "Close By Little Robert" (Monroe) – 2:32
9. "Feast Here Tonight" (Traditional) – 2:32
10. "Leavin' Home" (Traditional) – 4:07
11. "Little Cabin Home on the Hill" (Flatt, Monroe) – 3:22
12. "I'm Coming Back (But I Don't Know When)" (Monroe) – 3:25
13. "Salty Dog Blues" (Morris) – 2:26
14. "If I Lose" (Stanley) – 2:16
15. "Sad and Lonesome Day" (Traditional) – 3:05
16. "My Little Georgia Rose" (Monroe) – 3:04
17. "Foggy Mountain Top" (Carter Family) – 2:37
18. "I'm My Own Grandpaw" (Jaffe, Latham) – 3:11
19. "Pretty Polly" (Stanley) – 5:10
20. "Home Is Where the Heart Is" (Gately, Talley) – 1:57
21. "Nine Pound Hammer" (Merle Travis) – 2:16
22. "Memories of Mother and Dad" (Price) – 3:24
23. "Teardrops in My Eyes" (Allen, Sutton) – 2:57
24. "House of Gold" (Williams) – 2:47

== Personnel ==
- David Grisman – mandolin, vocals
- Harley Allen – vocals
- Red Allen – guitar, vocals
- Jim Buchanan – violin
- Sam Bush – violin
- Porter Church – banjo
- Mike Compton – mandolin
- J.D. Crowe – banjo
- Stuart Duncan – violin
- Pat Enright – guitar, vocals
- Greg Fulginiti- mastering
- Mark Hembree – bass
- Bobby Hicks – violin
- Roy Huskey, Jr. – bass
- Jim Kerwin – bass
- Del McCoury – guitar, vocals
- Alan O'Bryant – banjo, vocals
- Herb Pedersen – banjo, vocals
- Tony Rice – guitar, vocals
- Curly Seckler – vocals
- Ricky Skaggs – violin, vocals
- Chris Austin - guitar, violin
- Doc Watson– guitar, vocals
