= Live at the Boarding House: The Complete Shows =

Live album by Old & In the Way
- Released: October 1, 2013
- Recorded: October 1 and October 8, 1973
- Genre: Bluegrass
- Label: Acoustic Disc / Acoustic Oasis
- Producer: David Grisman

Old & In the Way chronology
| Live at the Boarding House (2008) | Live at the Boarding House: The Complete Shows (2013) | Live at Sonoma State – 11/4/73 (2023) |

Jerry Garcia chronology
| Garcia Live Volume Two (2013) | Live at the Boarding House: The Complete Shows (2013) | Garcia Live Volume Three (2013) |

David Grisman chronology
| Live at the Boarding House (2008) | Live at the Boarding House: The Complete Shows (2013) | Del & Dawg Live! (2016) |

Live at the Boarding House: The Complete Shows is a four-CD live album by the bluegrass band Old & In the Way. It was recorded on October 1 and October 8, 1973, at the Boarding House in San Francisco, and contains the complete concerts from those dates. It was released by Acoustic Disc and Acoustic Oasis on October 1, 2013. The album includes 55 tracks, 14 of which were previously unreleased.

The band Old & in the Way existed from 1973 to 1974 and played less than 50 shows. Its members were Jerry Garcia of the Grateful Dead on banjo, David Grisman on mandolin, Peter Rowan on guitar, Vassar Clements on fiddle, and John Kahn on bass.

== Critical reception ==
On AllMusic, Jeff Tamarkin said, "Although OAITW was able to handle a traditional bluegrass number — vocal or instrumental — as well as anyone, the musicians brought a jam band sensibility and rock attitude to the proceedings, extending the instrumental segments with improvisations, something alien to bluegrass up to that point. By doing so, the quintet pretty much invented the concept of progressive bluegrass, taking the music even further from its starting point than the New Grass Revival had the year before while simultaneously paying homage to its founders."

In Relix, Jesse Jarnow wrote, "While it was Peter Rowan's sweet silvery holler and the quintet's close dynamics that sold the Stinson Beach supergroup to audiences, it was Jerry Garcia's presence that sold the band's live LP to hippies, and in turn linked banjos to beardos forevermore.... The real stars, though, are the infinitely warm recordings themselves... Inside a tangible stereo field, the quintet's instrumental mesh is every bit as blended as the harmonies — a high, lonesome wholeness forever haunting the hills of Marin."

== Track listing ==
Disc 1
October 1, 1973 – first set:

1. "On and On" (Bill Monroe)
2. "I'm On My Way Back to the Old Home" (Monroe)
3. "Catfish John" (Bob McDill, Allen Reynolds)
4. "Lonesome Fiddle Blues" (Vassar Clements)
5. "Land of the Navajo" (Peter Rowan)
6. "Down Where the River Bends" (Jack Anglin, George Peck, Johnnie Wright)
7. "I Ain't Broke but I'm Badly Bent" (H. Payne)
8. "Lost" (Buzz Busby, Cindy Davis)
9. "Kissimee Kid" (Clements)
10. "Lonesome L.A. Cowboy" (Rowan)
11. "Pig in a Pen" (traditional)
12. "Wild Horses" (Mick Jagger, Keith Richards)
13. "Midnight Moonlight" (Rowan)

Disc 2
October 1, 1973 – second set:

1. "Muleskinner Blues" (Jimmie Rodgers, George Vaughn)
2. "Goin' to the Races" (Carter Stanley)
3. "Old and in the Way" (David Grisman)
4. "Old and in the Way Breakdown" (Jerry Garcia)
5. "Panama Red" (Rowan)
6. "Hard Hearted" (Jesse McReynolds, Jim McReynolds)
7. "That High Lonesome Sound" (Rowan)
8. "The Hobo Song" (Jack Bonus)
9. "Drifting Too Far from the Shore" (Charles E. Moody)
10. "Angel Band" (Jefferson Hascall, W.B. Bradbury)
11. "Wicked Path of Sin" (Monroe)
12. "Home Is Where the Heart Is" (Connie Gateley, Joe Talley)
13. "Uncle Pen" (Monroe)
14. "Orange Blossom Special" (Ervin T. Rouse)
15. "Blue Mule" (Rowan)

Disc 3
October 8, 1973 – first set:

1. "Home Is Where the Heart Is" (Gateley, Talley)
2. "Love Please Come Home" (Leon Jackson)
3. "Down Where the River Bends" (Anglin, Peck, Wright)
4. "Kissimee Kid" (Clements)
5. "Pig in a Pen" (traditional)
6. "Uncle Pen" (Monroe)
7. "Panama Red" (Rowan)
8. "Midnight Moonlight" (Rowan)
9. "White Dove" (Stanley)
10. "Wild Horses" (Jagger, Richards)
11. "Orange Blossom Special" (Rouse)
12. "Old and in the Way" (Grisman)
13. "Lonesome Fiddle Blues" (Clements)

Disc 4
October 8, 1973 – second set:

1. "On and On" (Monroe)
2. "Land of the Navajo" (Rowan)
3. "Catfish John" (McDill, Reynolds)
4. "'Til the End of the World Rolls 'Round" (Thomas Newton)
5. "Drifting Too Far from the Shore" (Moody)
6. "I'm Knocking on Your Door" (traditional)
7. "Old and in the Way Breakdown" (Garcia)
8. "You'll Find Her Name Written There" (Harold Hensley)
9. "Jerry's Breakdown" (Garcia)
10. "The Great Pretender" (Buck Ram)
11. "Working on a Building" (traditional)
12. "That High Lonesome Sound" (Rowan)
13. "Wicked Path of Sin" (Monroe)
14. "Blue Mule" (Rowan)

== Personnel ==
Old and in the Way

- Jerry Garcia – banjo, vocals
- David Grisman – mandolin, vocals
- Peter Rowan – guitar, vocals
- Vassar Clements – fiddle
- John Kahn – acoustic bass

Production

- Produced by David Grisman
- Recording: Owsley Stanley
- Editing: David Grisman, Micah Gordon
