= Even Dozen Jug Band =

American folk rock band

The Even Dozen Jug Band was founded in 1963 by Stefan Grossman (solo country blues and ragtime guitarist) and Peter Siegel (roots-based guitarist and producer) in New York City, New York, United States. Other members were David Grisman (a noted mandolinist), Steve Katz (later with Blues Project and Blood, Sweat and Tears), Maria Muldaur (then Maria D'Amato), Joshua Rifkin (arranger of Scott Joplin ragtime compositions,), and John Sebastian (later with the Lovin' Spoonful).

The Even Dozen Jug Band only existed for a short time. Their only recording was the self-titled album, The Even Dozen Jug Band, issued in December 1963 by Elektra Records.
