= Live at the Boarding House =

Live album by Old & In the Way
- Released: November 4, 2008
- Recorded: October 8, 1973
- Venues: The Boarding House, San Francisco, California
- Genre: Bluegrass
- Label: Acoustic Oasis

Old & In the Way chronology
Old & In the Gray (2002)	Live at the Boarding House (2008)	Live at the Boarding House: The Complete Shows (2013)

Jerry Garcia chronology
The Very Best of Jerry Garcia (2006)	Live at the Boarding House (2008)	Pure Jerry: Marin Veterans Memorial Auditorium, San Rafael, California, February 28, 1986 (2009)

David Grisman chronology
Satisfied (2007)	Live at the Boarding House (2008)	Live at the Boarding House: The Complete Shows (2013)

Professional ratings
Review scores
Source	Rating
Allmusic	4/5 stars

Live at the Boarding House is an album recorded by the American bluegrass group, Old & In the Way. It is a complete recording of a concert held October 8, 1973, at the Boarding House in San Francisco. It was released in 2008.

== Track listing ==
Disc 1

1. "Home is Where the Heart Is"
2. "Love Please Come Home"
3. "Down Where The River Bends"
4. "Kissimee Kid"
5. "Pig in a Pen"
6. "Uncle Pen"
7. "Panama Red"
8. "Midnight Moonlight"
9. "White Dove"
10. "Wild Horses"
11. "Orange Blossom Special"
12. "Old and in the Way"
13. "Lonesome Fiddle Blues"

Disc 2

1. "On and On"
2. "Land of the Navajo"
3. "Catfish John"
4. "Til the End of the World Rolls 'Round"
5. "Drifting Too Far from the Shore"
6. "I'm Knocking On Your Door"
7. "Old and in the Way Breakdown"
8. "You'll Find Her Name Written There"
9. "Jerry's Breakdown"
10. "The Great Pretender"
11. "Working on a Building"
12. "High Lonesome Sound"
13. "Wicked Path Of Sin"
14. "Blue Mule"

== Personnel ==
Old & In The Way

- Jerry Garcia - banjo, vocals
- David Grisman - mandolin, vocals
- Peter Rowan - guitar, vocals
- Vassar Clements - fiddle
- John Kahn - bass

Technical

- Craig Miller - executive producer
- Owsley Stanley III - recording

== Chart performance ==
Chart (2014)	Peak position
US Top Bluegrass Albums (Billboard)	3
