= The Even Dozen Jug Band (album) =

Studio album by Even Dozen Jug Band
- Released: December 1963
- Genre: Folk, jug band
- Length: 37:09
- Label: Elektra
- Producer: Paul Rothchild

The Even Dozen Jug Band is the only studio album by the American group Even Dozen Jug Band, released in December 1963.

Founded in 1963, the Even Dozen Jug Band recorded this, their only recording for Elektra Records. Members who later went on to successful music careers included Stefan Grossman, David Grisman, Steve Katz, Maria Muldaur (then Maria d'Amato), Joshua Rifkin, and John Sebastian.

== Reception ==
Professional ratings
Review scores
Source	Rating
Allmusic	4.5/5 stars

Music critic Ronnie D. Lankford, Jr. in his Allmusic "Mandolins, banjoes, pianos, guitars, fiddles, kazoos, and trombones vie with one another, creating a raucous free-for-all. The vocals on pieces like "Overseas Stomp" and "Evolution Mama" have a loose, just-for-the-heck-of-it feel that keeps the material lively and irreverent. The multiple combinations of instruments and voices, along with an exuberant approach, guarantee no boredom on this lovely disc. Certainly no stickler for strict traditionalism, the band shows how blues, ragtime, and jazz can be used to freshen up worn-out material."

== Reissues ==
- Ten of the songs were reissued in 1978 on Jug Band Music & Rags of the South by Everest Archive of Folk & Jazz Music.
- The Even Dozen Jug Band was reissued on CD in 2002 and again in 2008 by Collectors' Choice Music.
- The Even Dozen Jug Band was reissued on CD in 2005 by Elektra Records.

== Track listing ==
All songs Traditional unless otherwise noted.

=== Side one ===
1. "Take Your Fingers Off It" (Will Shade, Charlie Burse, J. Jones, C. Pierce) – 2:26
2. "Come on In" – 2:42
3. "Mandolin King Rag" – 1:47
4. "Overseas Stomp" (Will Shade, Jab Jones) – 1:45
5. "Evolution Mama" – 3:19
6. "The Even Dozens" (Josh Rifkin, G. Davis) – 2:55
7. "I Don't Love Nobody" – 2:56

=== Side two ===
1. "Rag Mama" – 2:13
2. "France Blues" – 2:42
3. "On the Road Again" (Shade, Jones) – 3:18
4. "Original Colossal Drag Rag" (Rifkin) – 2:59
5. "All Worn Out" – 2:51
6. "Lonely One in This Town" (Walter Jacobs, Lonnie Carter) – 3:02
7. "Sadie Green" – 2:10

== Personnel ==
- Stefan Grossman – vocals, guitar, banjo
- Pete Jacobson – vocals, guitar, banjo
- Pete Seigel – vocals, guitar, banjo
- Frank Goodkin – banjo
- David Grisman – mandolin
- Fred Weisz – violin
- Steve Katz – vocals, washboard
- Josh Rifkin – vocals, piano, kazoo
- John Sebastian, credited as John Benson – harmonica
- Danny Lauffer – jug
- Peggy Haine – jug
- Maria Muldaur, then Maria D'Amato – vocals
- Bob Gurland – trumpet, vocals

Production notes:

- Paul Rothchild – producer, editing
- Paul Nelson – original liner notes
- Richie Unterberger – reissue liner notes
