= Mondo Mando =

Studio album by David Grisman Quintet
- Released: 1981
- Genres: Americana, newgrass, jazz
- Label: Warner Bros.
- Producer: David Grisman

David Grisman chronology
Quintet '80 (1980)	Mondo Mando (1981)	Stephane Grappelli/David Grisman Live (1981)

David Grisman Quintet chronology
Quintet '80 (1980)	Mondo Mando (1981)	Dawg '90 (1990)

Tony Rice chronology
Still Inside (1981)	Mondo Mando (1981)	The Bluegrass Album (1981)

Professional ratings
Review scores
Source	Rating
Allmusic	4.5/5 stars

Mondo Mando is an all-instrumental album by American musician David Grisman, released in 1981.

== Track listing ==
All songs by David Grisman unless otherwise noted.

1. "Cedar Hill" – 3:47
2. "Dawg Funk" – 4:10
3. "Japan (Op. 23)" – 3:37
4. "Fanny Hill" – 3:09
5. "Anouman" (Django Reinhardt) – 4:58
6. "Caliente" – 7:29
7. "Albuquerque Turkey" – 2:56
8. "Mondo Mando" – 9:01

== Personnel ==
- David Grisman – mandolin
- Darol Anger – violin, mandolin
- Rob Wasserman – bass
- Mike Marshall – guitar, mandola

Technical

- Producer – David Grisman
- Executive Producer – Craig Miller
- Engineering – John Haeny
- Mastering – Greg Fulginiti
- Illustrator – Wayne Anderson

== Chart positions ==
Year	Chart	Position
1981	Billboard Jazz Albums	12
1981	The Billboard 200	174
