= Tone Poems (album) =

Studio album by David Grisman, Tony Rice
- Released: 1994
- Recorded: February 2, 1993 – January 15, 1994
- Studio: Dawg Studios
- Genre: Folk, bluegrass
- Length: 48:16
- Label: Acoustic Disc
- Producer: David Grisman

Tony Rice chronology
Crossings (1994)	Tone Poems (1994)	River Suite for Two Guitars (1995)

David Grisman chronology
Common Chord (1993)	Tone Poems (1994)	Dawganova (1995)

Professional ratings
Review scores
Source	Rating
Allmusic	4.5/5 stars

Tone Poems: The Sounds of the Great Vintage Guitars and Mandolins is an album of duets by mandolinist David Grisman and guitarist Tony Rice using vintage instruments.

== Track listing ==
All tracks are written by Dave Grisman except where noted.

No.	Title	Length
1.	"Turn of the Century"	2:55
2.	"The Prisoner's Waltz"	4:17
3.	"Sam-Bino"	2:38
4.	"Grandfather's Clock" (traditional)	3:12
5.	"Good Old Mountain Dew" (traditional)	2:19
6.	"I Am a Pilgrim" (traditional)	3:33
7.	"Mill Valley Waltz"	3:25
8.	"Vintage Gintage Blues"	3:15
9.	"I Don't Want Your Mandolins Mister" (traditional)	2:17
10.	"Dawg After Dark"	4:38
11.	"Wildwood Flower" (traditional)	2:47
12.	"Morning Sun"	4:12
13.	"Banks of the Ohio" (traditional)	2:23
14.	"Swing '42" (Django Reinhardt/Stephane Grappelli)	3:03
15.	"Watson Blues" (Bill Monroe)	3:30
16.	"’O sole mio" (traditional)	2:11
17.	"Song for Two Pamelas"	4:22

== Personnel ==
- David Grisman – mandolins
- Tony Rice – guitars

Some of the songs were performed on instruments made when the songs were written to allow the listener to experience the tonal properties of the original performances.

- Track 1: Martin 1-21 (1891), Gibson A-4 (1905)
- Track 2: Gibson Style "0" (1923), Gibson "3-Point" F-4 (1909)
- Track 3: Maurer Style 953 (c. 1915), Lyon & Healy Style A (1925)
- Track 4: Stahl Style 473 (1931), Vega Style 202 Lute Mandolin (1919)
- Track 5: Martin OM-18 (1931), Gibson A-2Z "Snakehead"(1924)
- Track 6: Martin D-28 (1935), Gibson Lloyd Loar F-5 (1923)
- Track 7: Martin 000-45 (1937), Gibson A-4 "Snakehead" (1924)
- Track 8: Regal "Le Domino" (1930's), S.S. Stewart "Snow Queen" (1930s)
- Track 9: Martin D-45 (1939), Gibson "Loar" A-5 (1923)
- Track 10: Gibson J-100 (1939), Gibson "Fern" F-5 (1925)
- Track 11: Gibson L-Century (1936), Martin Style 2-30 (1936)
- Track 12: Gibson Advanced Jumbo (1937), Gibson F-12 (1934)
- Track 13: Martin 0-18 (1937), Epiphone strand (1937)
- Track 14: Selmer (1950), Gibson F-10 (1934)
- Track 15: Martin D-18 (1943), Gibson F-4 (1942)
- Track 16: Martin D-28 (1952), Gibson Prototype A-5 (1953)
- Track 17: Santa Cruz Tony Rice Model (1993), Gilchrist Model 5 (1993)
