= John Carlini =

American jazz guitarist and arranger

- Born: Berkeley Heights, New Jersey
- Genres: Bluegrass, jazz
- Occupation: Musician
- Instrument: Guitar
- Website: johncarlini.com

John Carlini is an American jazz guitarist and arranger who performs bluegrass and jazz. He has performed with David Grisman, mandolin player Don Stiernberg, singer Bill Robinson, Bucky Pizzarelli, Rio Clemente, flatpicking guitarist Tony Rice, He is an orchestrator, conductor, and five-string banjo player. He formed the John Carlini Trio in 2000.

== Career ==
Carlini's father was a violinist for the New York Philharmonic and his mother was a concert pianist. Carlini served in the United States Navy and enrolled in the Berklee College of Music in Boston. He formed a friendship with David Grisman and was the musical director for Grisman's quartet. He appeared in the movie King of the Gypsies as a guitarist with violinist Stephane Grappelli. He went on tour for eight seasons as musical director of the Ice Capades. He orchestrated the off-Broadway musical Song of Singapore. He has worked with mandolinist and guitarist Todd Collins to create a jazz-bluegrass hybrid in their group Over the Edge. In addition, Carlini has played with the Nashville Mandolin Ensemble and was nominated in two categories for the 1997 Nashville Music Awards.

== Music reviews ==
All About Jazz music reviewer C. Michael Bailey wrote that he had "considerable guitar skills" and music critic Ronnie Lankford in All Music Guide wrote that his River Suite for Two Guitars, in which Carlini performed with Tony Rice, was "amazing how much lead work these two guitarists can fit into a two-minute song like Banister River". Critic Roman St. James in JazzReview.com wrote that Carlini and his band combine "the best elements of both jazz and bluegrass music" and that the "unlikely pairing" works well.

== Discography ==
- River Suite for Two Guitars with Tony Rice (Sugar Hill, 1995)
- A Christmas Gift with Bill Robinson (Orchard, 2000)
- The Game's Afoot (FGM, 2005)
- By George with Don Stiernberg (Blue Night, 2005)
- Further Adventures (Blue Night, 2007)
