= Martin Taylor (guitarist) =

British jazz guitarist (born 1956)

Martin Taylor MBE
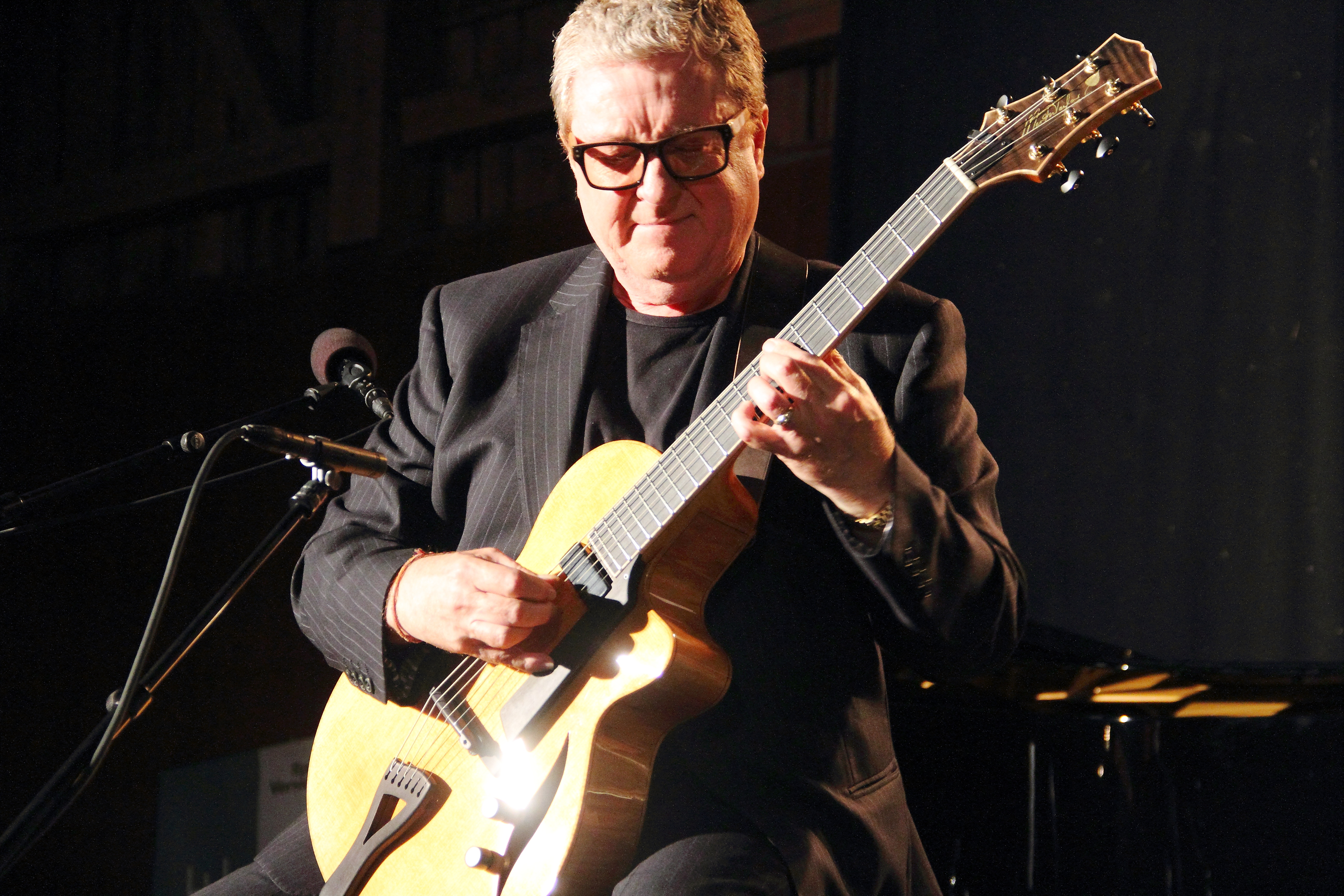
- Taylor at INNtöne Jazzfestival, 2017

Background information
- Born: 20 October 1956 (age 69); Harlow, England
- Genres: Jazz
- Occupation: Musician
- Instrument: Guitar
- Years active: 1964–present
- Labels: Linn; Acoustic Disc; Sony; Columbia; P3
- Website: martintaylor.com

Martin Taylor, MBE (born 20 October 1956) is a British jazz guitarist who has performed solo, in groups, guitar ensembles, and as an accompanist.

== Early life ==
Taylor was born in Harlow, Essex, into a family with a musical heritage and a Gypsy tradition. At the age of four, he received his first guitar from his father, jazz bassist William 'Buck' Taylor who only took up music at 30. Buck frequently played the music of the Quintette du Hot Club de France, so the young Martin Taylor became inspired by guitarist Django Reinhardt. At age eight, he was already playing in his father's band and at 15 he quit school to become a professional musician.

The band Martin joined at 15 called the Oo-yah Band was led by Lennie Hastings, a jazz drummer who had been in the Alex Welsh band. The band included Nick Stevenson (trumpet), Peter Skivington (bass guitar), Ron Brown (trombone), Jamie Evans (piano), Malcolm Everson (clarinet and baritone saxophone).

At the age of 17 he joined the band on the luxury ocean liner the QE2 based in New York. on returning to the UK he played dates in and around London which brought him into contact with jazz guitarist Ike Isaacs, who became a mentor. Isaacs not only performed with Taylor as a duo, but also helped Taylor develop his sense of jazz harmony and fingerstyle technique. He recorded for the first time in 1978, with bassist Peter Ind.

== The Grappelli years ==
Through Isaacs, Taylor was introduced to Stéphane Grappelli, former violinist of the Quintette du Hot Club de France, in which he played with Django Reinhardt. When one of Grappelli's band members was injured, Taylor was invited to play a few European dates. When Grappelli invited him to join full-time, Taylor accepted and performed and recorded with him for the next eleven years (1979–1990), occupying the position once held by his idol, Django Reinhardt.

His success with Grappelli allowed Taylor more freedom. He reduced some of his commitments and moved to Scotland. Another benefit of his association with Grappelli was that he began to tour North America regularly, helping him reach a larger audience and build new relationships. He has worked with Chet Atkins, Joe Pass, Tal Farlow, Barney Kessel, and Herb Ellis.

== Going solo ==
To avoid relying on other musicians for income, Taylor started to perform as a solo act. After a few years, he stopped touring with Grappelli. A recording contract with Scottish label Linn Records, helped make it possible for him to concentrate on his solo career. Linn was primarily a manufacturer of high-end audio equipment, and found that Taylor's intimate and intricate style and tone ably demonstrated the quality of their equipment. These Linn recordings include solo work (Artistry and Portraits, which featured Chet Atkins) and some recordings with a modern jazz quartet (Don't Fret). The relative success of these albums and his concert dates raised Taylor's profile in the guitar community.

In 1991, Taylor performed in Australia, giving a solo performance on the Hey Hey It's Saturday show. Guitarist Tommy Emmanuel saw him on the show and contacted him, and the two became friends and frequent collaborators. Taylor has stated that although their backgrounds were different, they shared many similarities and found that they had been living parallel lives on opposite sides of the world.

== Spirit of Django ==
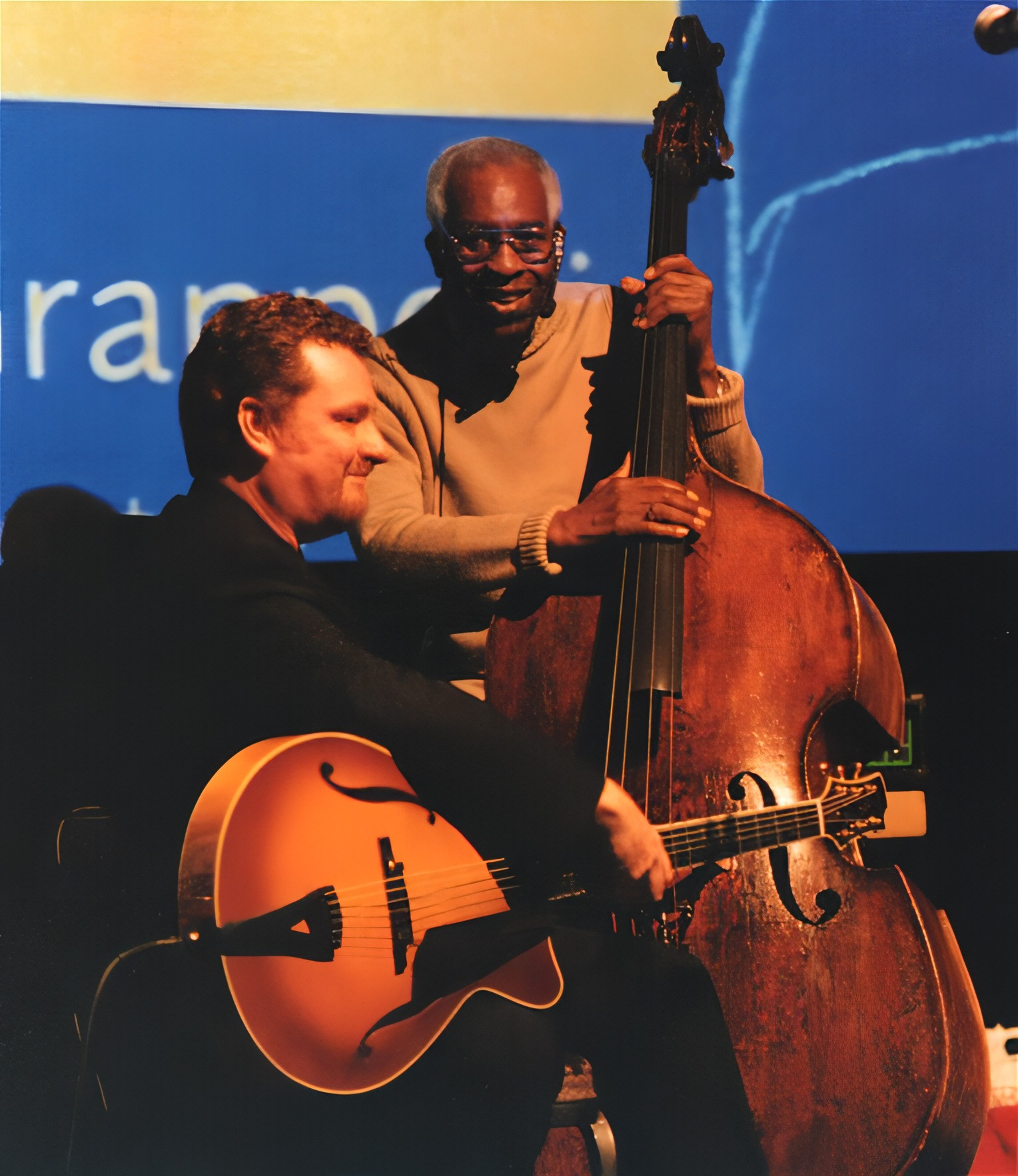
Martin Taylor (left) and Coleridge Goode in London, 2002 at the released of the DVD A Life in the Jazz Century

In 1994, Taylor started the band Spirit of Django, which was inspired by Django Reinhardt and the Hot Club. He recorded and toured with this band while continuing his solo commitments. At the end of the decade he signed with Sony Music, releasing two albums, Kiss and Tell and Nitelife. After leaving Sony, he signed with P3 Music, which released Solo and The Valley with guest appearances by Bryn Terfel and Sacha Distel.

At a celebration for the film Stéphane Grappelli: A Life in the Jazz Century, Taylor performed with associates of Grappelli, including John Etheridge, Jack Emblow, and Coleridge Goode. Since 2010, he has been teaching guitar on his online school.

== Influences ==
His earliest influence was gypsy jazz guitarist Django Reinhardt from the Hot Club of France. Other influences include mentor Ike Isaacs, Ted Greene, Kenny Burrell, Wes Montgomery, and Joe Pass. Although Taylor is inspired by many guitarists, musically he relates more to pianists, particularly Art Tatum.

Taylor's set lists include songs from the Great American Songbook and his own compositions. His arrangements and compositions are often influenced by composers like Nelson Riddle and Duke Ellington and therefore include moving lines to fill in the spaces, e.g. walking basslines, syncopated chordal 'stabs' (to emulate horn sections), and complex jazz harmony. He considers melody the most important part of an arrangement.

== Equipment ==
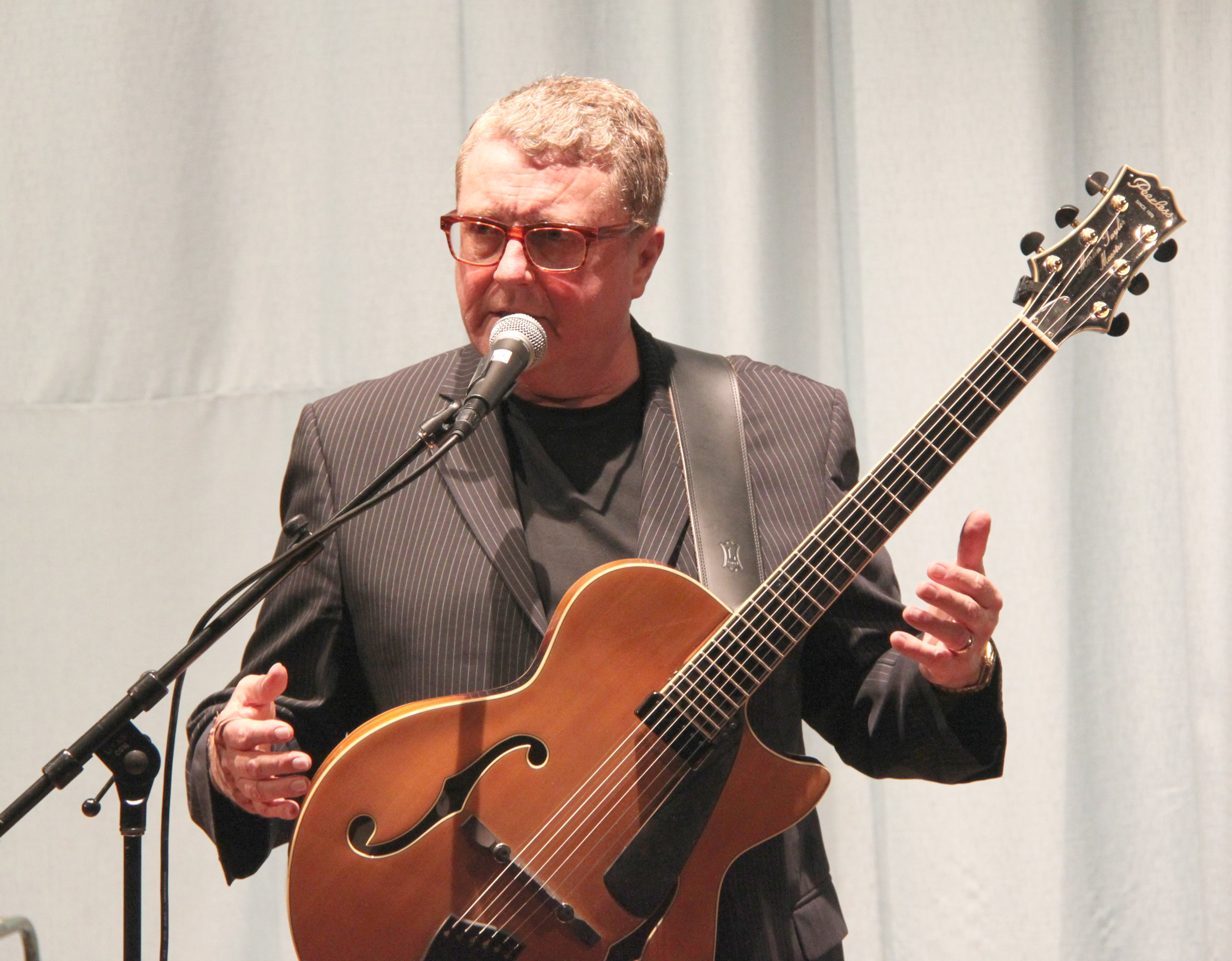
Martin Taylor in Hobart, Australia in 2014, with his signature model Peerless Guitar

Martin Taylor often uses guitars built by Scottish-based luthier Mike Vanden. They produced the Martin Taylor Artistry archtop with another, nylon-stringed, archtop used for Spirit of Django. Throughout the 1990s he played a Yamaha AEX1500, which he helped develop. In 2012, Peerless guitars announced the release of two guitars endorsed by Martin. In 2018, in collaboration with UK based premium hand-crafted guitar specialist, Fibonacci Guitars, the Martin Taylor branded "Joya" guitar was launched followed in 2022 by the slightly smaller and thinner "Lola" model

== Awards and honors ==
Member of the Order of the British Empire, awarded by Queen Elizabeth II (2002)

== Discography ==
=== As leader ===
- Taylor Made (Wave, 1979)
- After Hours (JTC, 1979)
- Triple Libra (Wave, 1981)
- Skye Boat (Concord Jazz, 1982)
- A Tribute to Art Tatum (Hep, 1986)
- Sarabanda (Gaia, 1989)
- Don't Fret! (Linn, 1990)
- Change of Heart (Linn, 1991)
- Gordon Giltrap & Martin Taylor (Prestige, 1991)
- Artistry (Linn, 1992)
- Spirit of Django (Linn, 1994)
- Tone Poems 2 with David Grisman (Acoustic Disc, 1995)
- Portraits with Chet Atkins (Linn, 1996)
- Years Apart (Linn, 1996)
- Two's Company (Linn, 1997)
- Gypsy (Linn, 1998)
- Kiss and Tell (Columbia, 1999)
- I'm Beginning to See the Light with David Grisman (Acoustic Disc, 1999)
- Martin Taylor in Concert (Milestone/Fantasy, 2000)
- Nitelife (Columbia, 2001)
- Solo (P3 Music, 2002)
- Masterpiece Guitars with Steve Howe (P3 Music, 2002)
- Gypsy Journey (P3 Music, 2003)
- The Valley (P3 Music, 2004)
- Martins4 (P3 Music, 2005)
- Freternity (P3 Music, 2007)
- Double Standards (P3 Music, 2008)
- 1 AM with Alison Burns (P3 Music, 2008)
- Last Train to Hauteville (P3 Music, 2010)
- Live at Wigmore Hall with David Grisman (Acoustic Disc, 2011)
- Two for the Road with Alan Barnes (Woodville, 2011)
- First Time Together! with David Grisman, Frank Vignola (Acoustic Disc, 2012)
- The Colonel and the Governor with Tommy Emmanuel (Mesa/Bluemoon, 2013)
- I'll Be Home with Alison Burns (P3 Music, 2014)

=== As sideman ===
With Buddy DeFranco

- On Tour UK: Buddy DeFranco Quartet Featuring Martin Taylor (Hep, 1984)
- Groovin (Hep, 1985)
- Garden of Dreams (ProJazz, 1988)

With Stephane Grappelli

- Vintage 1981 (Concord Jazz, 1981)
- At the Winery (Concord Jazz, 1981)
- We've Got the World On a String (Angel, 1982)
- Just One of Those Things (EMI, 1984)
- Bringing It Together (Cymekob, 1984)
- Live in San Francisco (Storyville, 1986)
- Together at Last (Flying Fish, 1987)
- Olympia 1988 (Atlantic, 1988)
- Stephane Grappelli Plays Jerome Kern (GRP, 1987)
- Milou en Mai (CBS, 1990)
- Reunion (Linn, 1993)
- Celebrating Grappelli (Honest, 1997)
- Live at the Cambridge Folk Festival (True North/Fuel 2000, 1999)

With Karl Jenkins

- Adiemus IV The Eternal Knot (Venture/Virgin, 2000)
- Live (Venture, 2001)
- Vocalise (OmTown/Virgin, 2003)

With Yehudi Menuhin

- Strictly for the Birds (Angel, 1980)
- Top Hat (His Master's Voice, 1984)
- For All Seasons (EMI, 1985)
- Menuhin & Grappelli Play Jealousy & Other Great Standards (EMI, 1988)

With Bill Wyman

- Anyway the Wind Blows (BMG/RCA, 1998)
- Struttin' Our Stuff (BMG/RCA, 1997)
- Groovin (Roadrunner/Papillon/Ripple, 2000)
- Live in Europe (Ripple, 2000)
- Double Bill (Disky, 2001)
- Travlin' Band (Ripple, 2002)
- On the Road Again (Ripple, 2003)
- Just for a Thrill (Ripple, 2004)
- The Kings of Rhythm Vol. 1: Jump, Jive and Wail (Edsel, 2016)

With others

- Denys Baptiste, Alternating Currents (Dune, 2001)
- Teresa Brewer, On the Road Again (Doctor Jazz, 1983)
- Teresa Brewer, American Music Box Vol. 1 The Songs of Irving Berlin (Doctor Jazz, 1987)
- Elkie Brooks, Live with Friends (Eventful Music, 2006)
- Chas and Dave, That's What Happens (Warner 2013)
- Jaki Graham, Heaven Knows (EMI, 1985)
- David Grisman, David Grisman's Acoustic Christmas (Rounder, 1983)
- David Grisman, Dawg Jazz & Dawg Grass (Warner Bros., 1983)
- Peter Ind, Jazz Bass Baroque (Wave, 1988)
- Kiri Te Kanawa, Kiri Sings Karl (EMI, 2006)
- Carol Kidd, All My Tomorrows (Aloi, 1985)
- Didier Lockwood, Waltz Club (EmArcy, 2006)
- Didier Lockwood, For Stephane (Ames, 2008)
- Claire Martin, Off Beat (Linn, 1995)
- Courtney Pine, Journey to the Urge Within (Antilles, 1986)
- Prefab Sprout, Andromeda Heights (Kitchenware/Columbia, 1997)
- Spike Robinson, London Reprise (Capri, 1984)
- Bryn Terfel, Bryn (Deutsche Grammophon, 2003)
