= Enrique Coria =

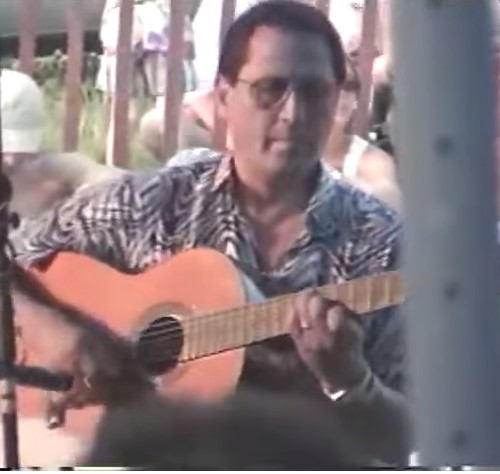
Enrique Coria at the Grey Fox Bluegrass Festival in 1998

David Grisman, Chris Thile and Enrique Coria at the Grey Fox Bluegrass Festival in 1998

Enrique "Quique" Coria (coh-rhia) was a guitarist from Dique Los Molinos, Argentina.

Coria appeared on over 400 recordings in South America and the US including with David Grisman's DGQ (David Grisman Quintet).

He spoke both Spanish and English and resided in Oakland, California with his wife, singer, Yolanda Aranda. Coria had two children from his first marriage, the eldest being Carol and ten years younger, Raymundo Coria. He died on August 4, 2025 in Coral Springs, FL.

== Recordings ==
- Solos From South America (ACD 6, Acoustic Disc Records)
- Latin Touch (ACD 23, Acoustic Disc Records)
- Intimo with Yolanda Aranda (ACD 50, Acoustic Disc Records)
- Dawganova with David Grisman Quintet (ACD 17, Acoustic Disc Records)
- DGQ 20 with David Grisman Quintet (ACD 20, Acoustic Disc Records)
- Dawgnation with David Grisman Quintet (ACD 49, Acoustic Disc Records)
