= Matt Eakle =

American jazz musician

- Origin: Richmond, California, U.S.
- Genres: Jazz, blues, classical
- Instruments: Flute

Matt Eakle is an American flute player and author who has been the flutist for the David Grisman Quintet since 1989. He plays jazz, blues, and classical flute.

== Career ==
He has performed with Jerry Garcia, Stéphane Grappelli, Vassar Clements, Bonnie Raitt, Linda Ronstadt, Tony Rice, as well as with various symphony orchestras around the world. He has recorded at least three solo projects outside of the David Grisman Quintet: 1998's Flute Jazz, 2002's The Headwaters Project, and 2009's Hardly Work.

Eakle has authored at least two books on flute technique.

== Personal life ==
Eakle grew up in Richmond, California, and resided in San Anselmo, California, for many years. He later moved to Bellingham, Washington, where he regularly performs at local venues.
