= Joe Craven =

American musician and educator

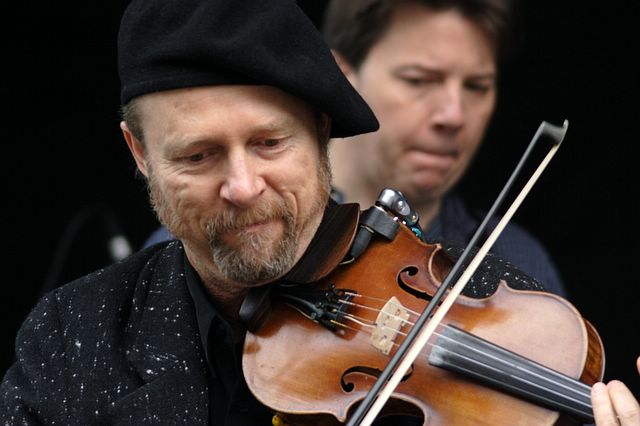

Background information
- Genres: Roots; Folk; World; Jazz; Americana
- Occupations: Musician educator MC
- Instruments: Fiddle, Mandolin, Tenor Guitar; Puerto Rican Cuatro; Tres Cubano conventional and found sound percussion Jawbone
- Label: Blender Logic Arts

Joe Craven is an American freestyle folk, world and roots music multi-instrumentalist, singer and educator. He is the Director of RiverTunes Music Camp and a Co-Director of the Wintergrass Youth Academy. He plays a wide variety of string instruments, including fiddle, mandolin, ukulele, tres, cavaquinho, balalaika, as well as percussion, including a pickling jar, a credit card, or a jawbone. Craven is a well known sight at acoustic music festivals and, for many years, was violinist and percussionist for the David Grisman Quintet. He also played percussion in the group Psychograss with fiddler Darol Anger and mandolinist Mike Marshall. Craven lists some of his influences being Jimi Hendrix, dumpster diving, Hermeto Pascoal, thrift stores, Frank Zappa, educator and aesthetician John Dewey, beachcombing, Carl Stalling, Eddie Palmieri, field recordings, Tiny Moore, Los Pleneros De Viente Uno, Darol Anger and The Horseflies.

Craven has played with many notable musicians including Jerry Garcia, Stephane Grappelli, Alison Brown, Rob Ickes and David Lindley. He performs solo and in different sizes and versions of his own projects, most notably The Joe Craven Trio.

== Discography ==
- Camptown (1996) – An album of classic American/Celtic fiddle tunes.
- Mo' Joe (2002) – A collection of classic folk and bluegrass tracks performed in a variety of styles including jazz, hip-hop, rock, and pop.
- Django Latino (2004) – A Latin-inspired collection of Django Reinhardt compositions performed on a wide range of instruments, including Joe's Mandolin, Mandola, violin, cavaquinio and percussion.
- Foakee (2009) – In collaboration with bassist/pianist/composer Sam Bevan, traditional songs and instrumentals.
- All Four One (2011) – Original compositions by the four members of the Joe Craven Trio. Instrumental works and two songs paying tribute to the Blues, New Orleans, Swing, Funk and Bluegrass, as well as music of Brazil, Haiti, Puerto Rico and Ireland.
- Garcia Songbook (2018) – An album of songs written or previously performed by Jerry Garcia. With The Sometimers (Jonathan Stoyanoff, Bruce MacMillan, Barry Eldridge, Hattie Craven).
