= David Grisman =

American mandolinist, composer, and record label owner (born 1945)

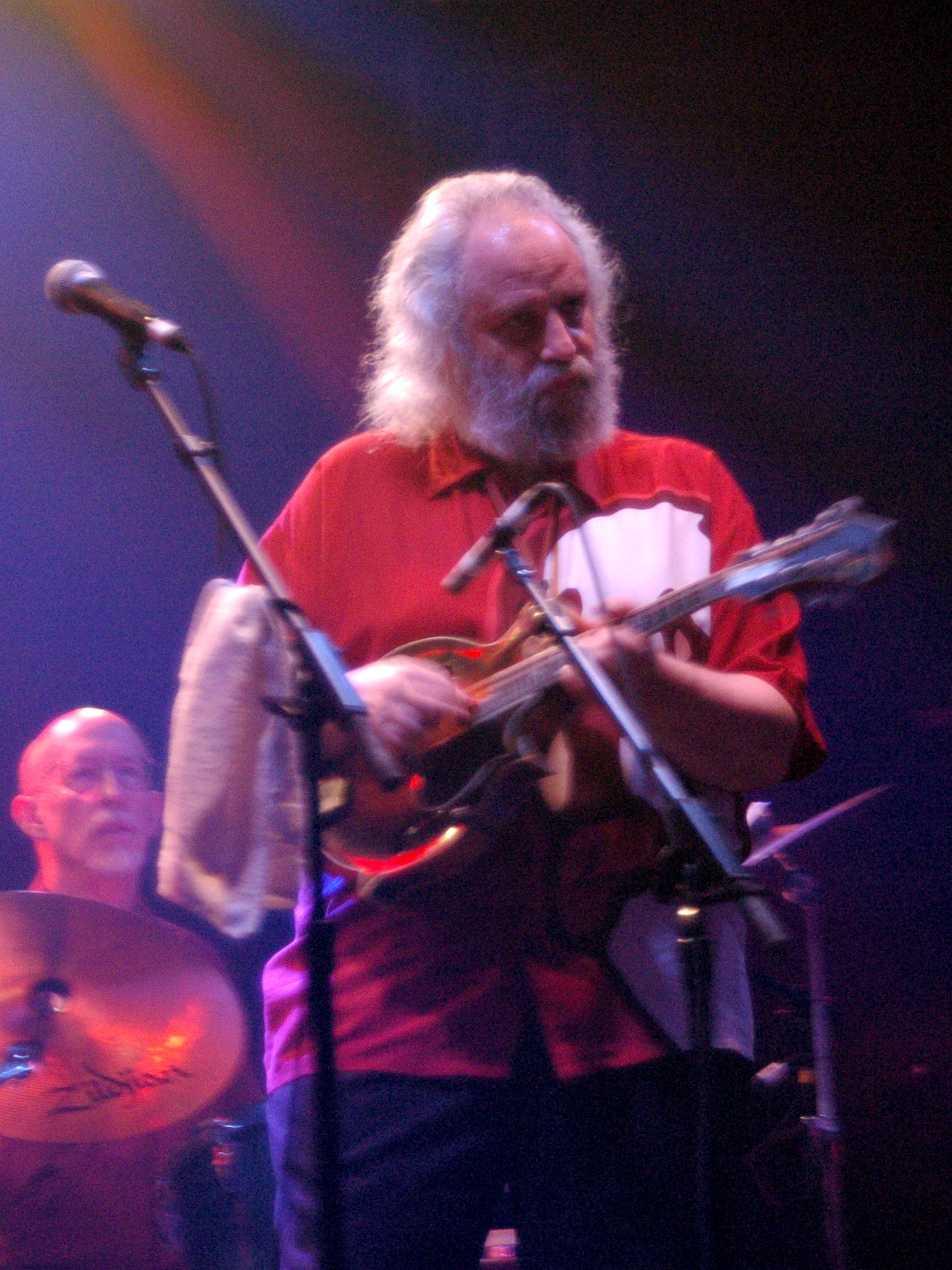
- Grisman on stage at the Granada Theater in Dallas, March 2006

Background information
- Also known as: "Dawg"
- Born: David Jay Grisman; March 23, 1945 (age 81); Hackensack, New Jersey, U.S.
- Genres: Bluegrass; progressive bluegrass; folk; jazz fusion; Americana
- Occupations: Musician; composer; record producer; label owner
- Instruments: Mandolin; mandola; mandocello; piano; saxophone; vocals
- Years active: 1963–present
- Labels: Kaleidoscope Records, Horizon Records; Warner Bros. Records; Rounder Records; Acoustic Disc
- Website: dawgnet.com

David Jay Grisman (born March 23, 1945) is an American mandolinist. His music combines bluegrass, folk, and jazz in a genre he calls "dawg music". He founded the record label Acoustic Disc, which releases his recordings and those of other acoustic musicians. He was inducted into the International Bluegrass Music Hall of Fame in Owensboro, Kentucky in 2023.

== Biography ==
Grisman grew up in a Conservative Jewish household in Passaic, New Jersey. His father was a professional trombonist who gave him piano lessons when he was seven years old. As a teenager, he played piano, mandolin, and saxophone.

In the early 1960s, he attended New York University in Manhattan. He belonged to the Even Dozen Jug Band with Maria Muldaur and John Sebastian. Grisman played in the Kentuckians, a bluegrass band led by Red Allen, then in the psychedelic rock band Earth Opera with Peter Rowan. He moved to San Francisco, met Jerry Garcia, and appeared on the Grateful Dead album American Beauty.

Grisman played in Old & In the Way, Garcia's bluegrass band, with Rowan and Vassar Clements. When Grisman was 17 years old, he was invited on stage by Doc Watson to join him on mandolin for a rendition of “In the Pines”. Garcia named him "Dawg" after a dog which was nearby while they were stopped while driving in Stinson Beach, California near Mount Tamalpais. "Dawg Music" is what Grisman says is his mixture of bluegrass and Django Reinhardt/Stéphane Grappelli-influenced jazz as highlighted on his album Hot Dawg (recorded in October 1978 and released in 1979). Grisman's combination of Reinhardt-era jazz, bluegrass, folk, Old World Mediterranean string band music, as well as modern jazz fusion which developed into "Dawg" music.

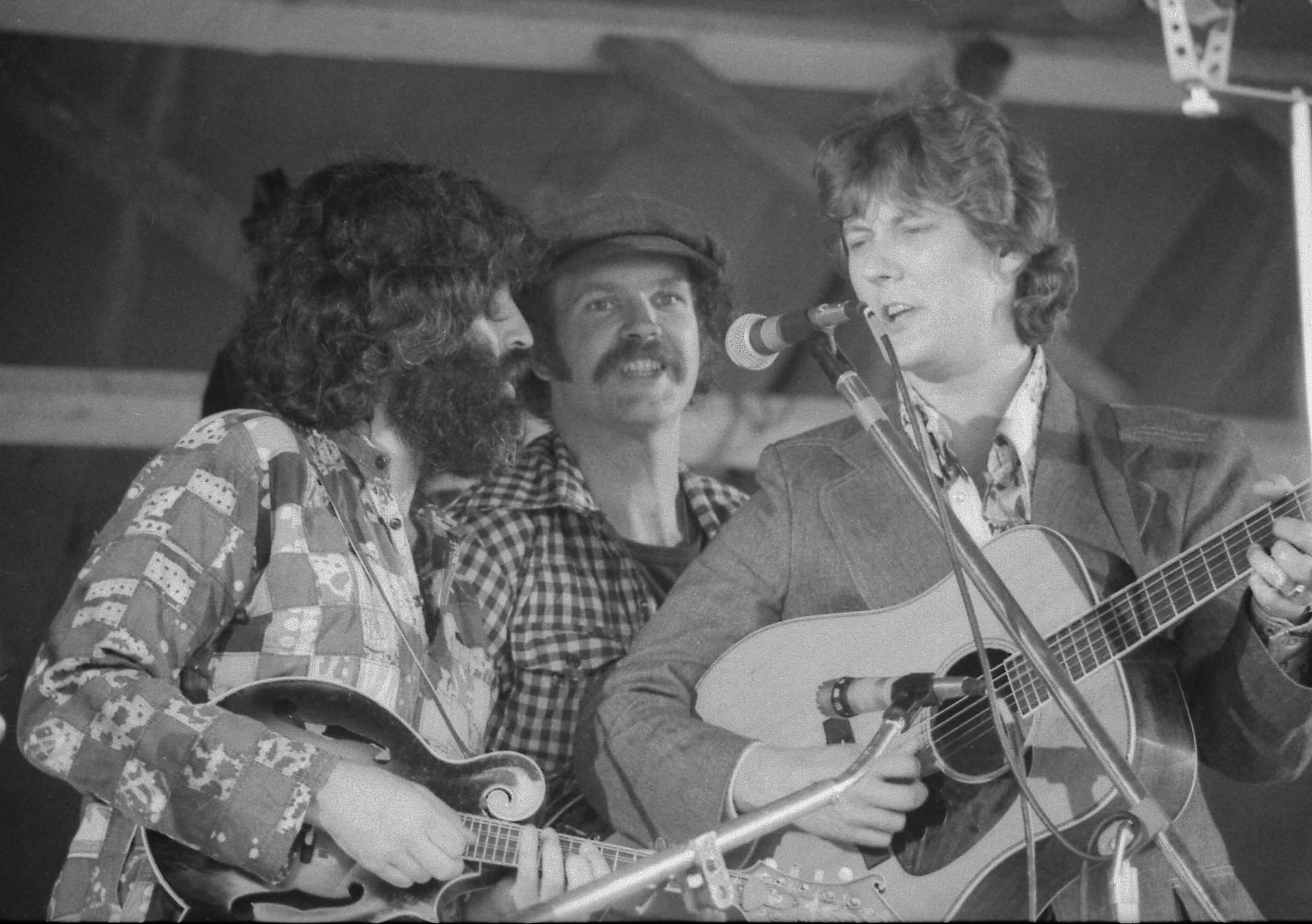
Grisman (left) with Bill Keith (banjo) and Tony Rice (guitar) at the 1977 Courville sur Eure Folk festival, Eure-et-Loir, France

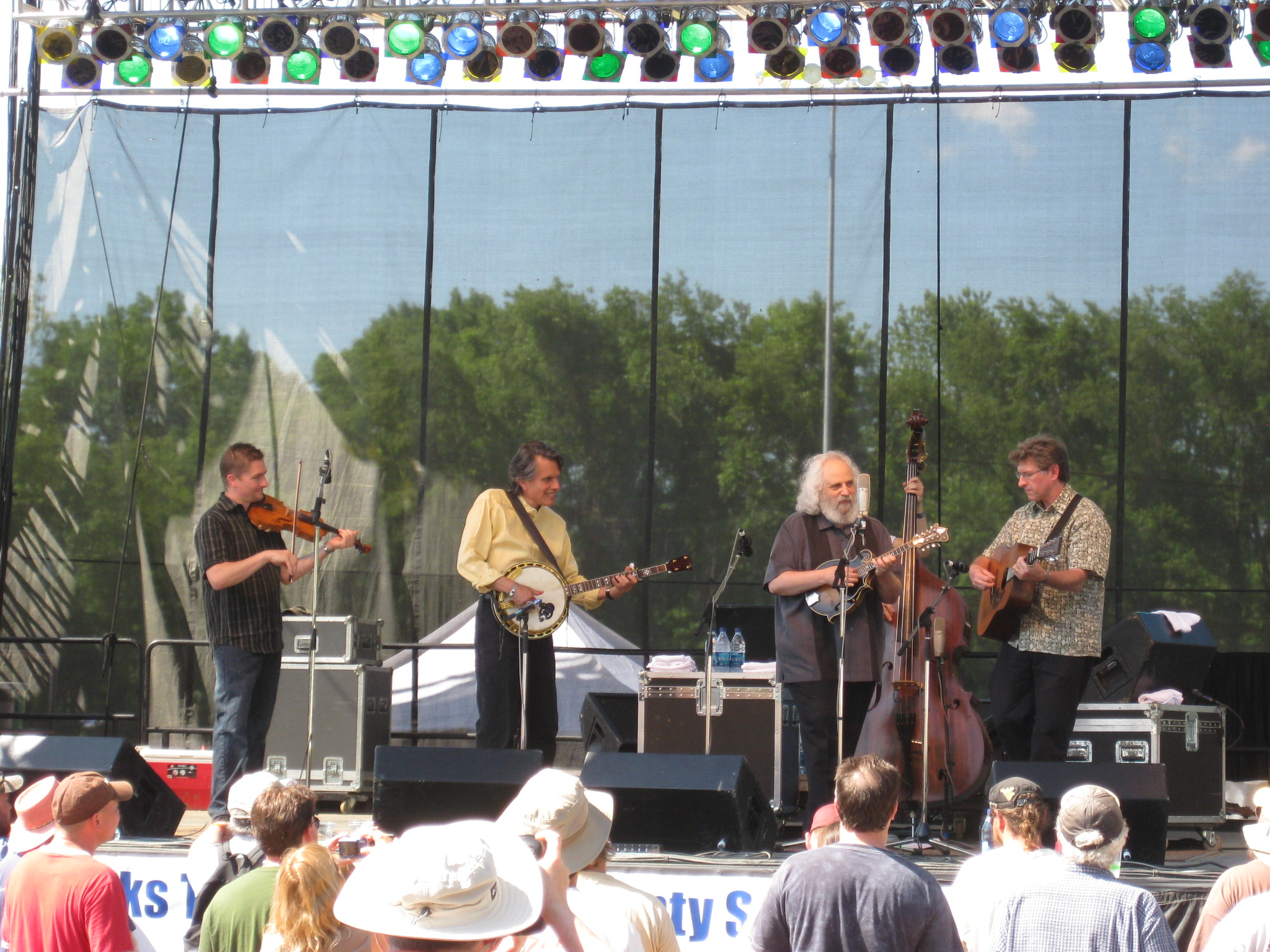
The David Grisman Bluegrass Experience performs at DelFest on May 30, 2010

In the 1970s, Grisman started the David Grisman Quintet with Darol Anger, Joe Carroll, Todd Phillips, and Tony Rice. They released their eponymous first album in 1977 for Kaleidoscope Records and their second, Hot Dawg, in 1979 for Horizon Records, the jazz division of A&M Records. When the quintet recorded for Warner Bros. Records, the membership changed to include Mike Marshall, Mark O'Connor, and Rob Wasserman, with occasional guest appearances by jazz violinist Stéphane Grappelli.

In the 1980s, Grisman formed an record label Acoustic Disc, which issued his recordings and those of other acoustic musicians. The folk and bluegrass part of his personality emerged when he recorded with O'Connor, Rice, and Andy Statman.

== Family ==
Grisman and Tracy Bigelow are married and she is his third wife. He has three grown children: Samson, Gillian, and Monroe. Samson, a bassist and recording session musician living in Portland, Oregon, often performs with his father. Gillian, a filmmaker living in Novato, California, directed Grateful Dawg and the music documentary, Village Music: Last of the Great Record Stores.

Monroe Grisman, named for bluegrass music pioneer Bill Monroe, lives in Fairfax, California and plays in the Tom Petty tribute band Petty Theft.

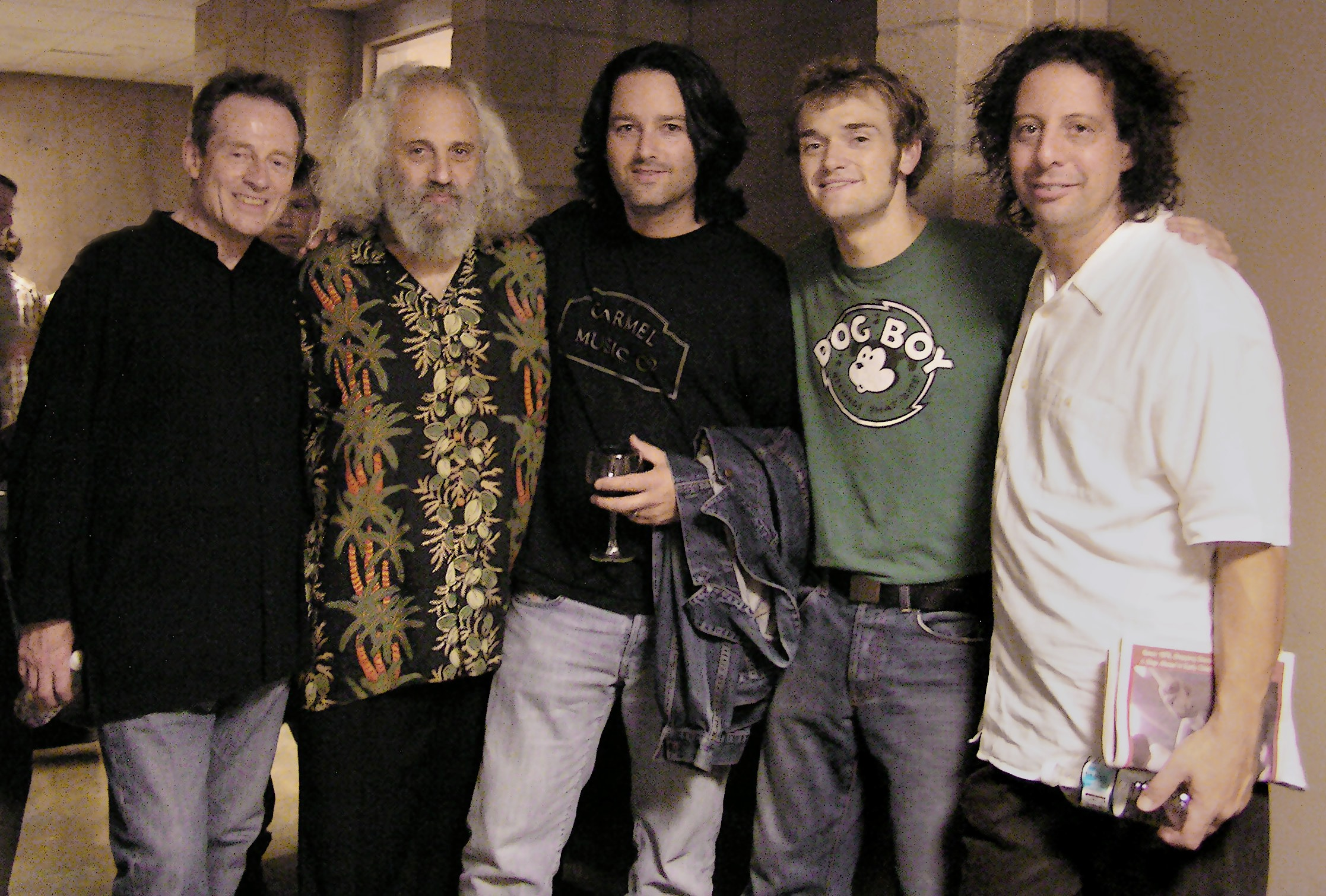
Backstage at the Mandolin Symposium, Aug 2004, with John Paul Jones, David Grisman, Monroe Grisman, Chris Thile, and Mike Marshall

== In media ==
David Grisman, Chris Thile, and Enrique Coria at the Grey Fox Bluegrass Festival in Oak Hill, New York, July 1998

David Grisman's song "Dawggy Mountain Breakdown", a variation of "Foggy Mountain Breakdown", was the opening theme song for Car Talk on NPR. He sued YouTube in May 2007 in federal court, saying that YouTube should be required to prevent individuals from illegally uploading recordings of his music. Grisman's attorneys requested voluntary dismissal of the suit.

The documentary Grateful Dawg (October 14, 2001) is about the friendship between Jerry Garcia and Grisman. He wrote much of the bluegrass music for Big Bad Mama (1974) directed by Roger Corman. It was performed by the Great American Music Band; they were recorded and mixed by Bill Wolf.

== Discography ==
- Mondo Mando (1981), illustrated by Wayne Anderson

== Acoustic Disc ==
Acoustic Disc
- Founded: 1990
- Founder: David Grisman
- Genre: Jazz; folk; bluegrass
- Country of origin: U.S.
- Location: San Rafael, California
- Official website: acousticdisc.com

Acoustic Disc is an independent record label which Grisman started in 1990. The label is based in San Rafael, California and specializes in bluegrass, folk, jazz, and Dawg music.
