= Peter Rowan discography =

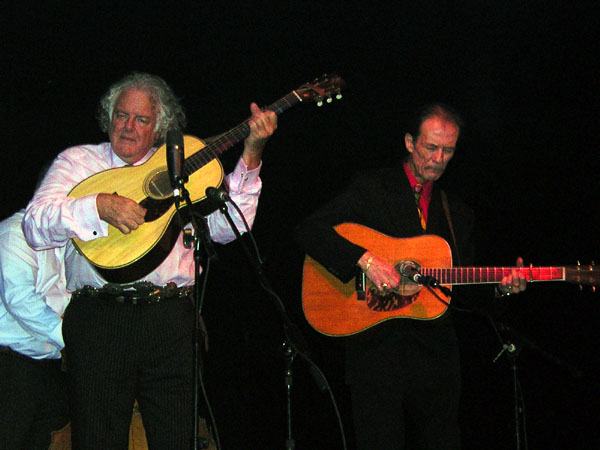
- Peter Rowan (left) performing with Tony Rice on November 7, 2008.

This article presents the discography of singer, composer, guitar and mandolin player Peter Rowan.

== With The Mother Bay State Entertainers ==
- The String Band Project (1965) (various artists album)

== With Bill Monroe ==
- Blue Grass Time (1967)

== With Earth Opera ==
- Earth Opera (1968)
- The Great American Eagle Tragedy (1969)

== With Seatrain ==
- Seatrain (1970)
- The Marblehead Messenger (1971)

== With Muleskinner ==
- Muleskinner (1973) (later re-released as A Potpourri of Bluegrass Jam)
- Muleskinner Live: Original Television Soundtrack (1994, recorded 1973)

== With Old & In the Way and Old and in the Gray ==
- Old & In the Way (1975, recorded 1973)
- That High Lonesome Sound (1996, recorded 1973)
- Breakdown (1997, recorded 1973)
- Old and in the Gray (2002)
- Live at the Boarding House (2008, recorded 1973)
- Live at the Boarding House: The Complete Shows (2013, recorded 1973)

== As The Rowans, The Rowan Brothers and Peter Rowan & the Rowan Brothers ==
- The Rowan Brothers (1972)
- The Rowans (1975)
- Sibling Rivalry (1976)
- Jubilation (1977)
- Tree on a Hill (1994)
- Crazy People (2002)

== As Peter Rowan & Tony Rice ==
- You Were There For Me (2004)
- Quartet (2007)

== As Rowan & Greene & The Red Hot Pickers ==
- Bluegrass Album, (1979)
- Hiroshima Mon Amour (1979)
- Peter Rowan with The Red Hot Pickers - compilation (1984)

== As Peter Rowan & Flaco Jiménez ==
- San Antonio Sound (1983)
- Live Rockin' Tex-Mex (1984)

== Solo albums and collaborations ==
- Peter Rowan (1978)
- Texican Badman (1980, recorded 1974/1979)
- Medicine Trail (1980)
- Peter Rowan & the Wild Stallions (1981)
- The Walls of Time (1982)
- Revelry, Peter Rowan, Tex Logan & Greg Douglas (1983)
- The First Whippoorwill (1985)
- Hot Bluegrass, Peter Rowan, Bill Keith, & Jim Rooney (1985)
- New Moon Rising, Peter Rowan & The Nashville Bluegrass Band (1988)
- Dust Bowl Children (1990)
- All on a Rising Day (1991)
- Awake Me in the New World (1993)
- Yonder, Peter Rowan and Jerry Douglas (1996)
- Bluegrass Boy (1996)
- New Freedom Bell, Druhá Tráva and Peter Rowan (1999)
- Reggaebilly (2001)
- High Lonesome Cowboy, Don Edwards and Peter Rowan (2002)
- Live Bonnaroo, Peter Rowan & Crucial Reggae - download only (2005)
- Crucial Country: Live At Telluride (2006, recorded 1994)
- Legacy, Peter Rowan Bluegrass Band, (2010)
- The Old School (2013)
- Live at the Boarding House: The Complete Shows (2013, recorded 1973)
- Peter Rowan's Twang an' Groove Vol. 1 (2014)
- Dharma Blues (2014)
- My Aloha! (2017)
- Carter Stanley's Eyes (2018)

== Peter Rowan chronological discography ==
=== 1965–1967 ===
- The String Band Project (1965) (various artists album)
- Blue Grass Time (1967)

=== 1968–1970 ===
- Earth Opera (1968)
- The Great American Eagle Tragedy (1969)
- Seatrain (1970)

=== 1971–1980 ===
- The Marblehead Messenger (1971)
- The Rowan Brothers (1972)
- Muleskinner (1973)
- Old & In the Way (1975, recorded 1973)
- The Rowans (1975)
- Sibling Rivalry (1976)
- Jubilation (1977)
- Peter Rowan (1978)
- Bluegrass Album (1979)
- Hiroshima Mon Amour (1979)
- Texican Badman (1980, recorded 1974/1979)
- Medicine Trail (1980)

=== 1981–1990 ===
- Peter Rowan & the Wild Stallions (1981)
- The Usual Suspects (1981)
- The Walls of Time (1982)
- It's All Music The Usual Suspects (1982)
- San Antonio Sound (1983)
- Revelry, Peter Rowan, Tex Logan & Greg Douglas (1983)
- Above Suspicion The Usual Suspects (1983)
- Live Rockin' Tex-Mex (1984)
- Peter Rowan with The Red Hot Pickers - compilation (1984)
- The First Whippoorwill (1985)
- Hot Bluegrass, Peter Rowan, Bill Keith, & Jim Rooney (1985)
- New Moon Rising, Peter Rowan & The Nashville Bluegrass Band (1988)
- Dust Bowl Children (1990)

=== 1991–2000 ===
- All on a Rising Day (1991)
- Awake Me in the New World (1993)
- Tree on a Hill (1994)
- Yonder, Peter Rowan and Jerry Douglas (1996)
- Bluegrass Boy (1996)
- That High Lonesome Sound (1996, recorded 1973)
- Breakdown (1997, recorded 1973)
- Original Television Soundtrack (1998, recorded 1973)
- New Freedom Bell, Druhá Tráva and Peter Rowan (1999)

=== 2001–2010 ===
- Reggaebilly (2001)
- High Lonesome Cowboy, Don Edwards and Peter Rowan (2002)
- Crazy People (2002)
- Old and in the Gray (2002)
- You Were There For Me, Peter Rowan & Tony Rice (2004)
- Live Bonnaroo, Peter Rowan & Crucial Reggae - download only (2005)
- Crucial Country: Live At Telluride (2006, recorded 1994)
- Quartet, Peter Rowan & Tony Rice (2007)
- Live at the Boarding House (2008, recorded 1973) -- withdrawn by label
- Legacy (2010)

=== 2011–2020 ===
- The Old School (2013)
- Live at the Boarding House: The Complete Shows (2013, recorded 1973)
- Peter Rowan's Twang an' Groove Vol. 1 (2014)
- Dharma Blues (2014)
- My Aloha! (2017)
- Carter Stanley's Eyes (2018)

=== 2021–2030 ===
- Calling You From My Mountain (2022)
