= Richard Greene discography =

Richard Greene is an American violinist. In addition to his 11 solo albums and his recordings with Seatrain, Muleskinner, and the Greene String Quartet, he has been featured as a performer on many albums by other artists.

== Solo albums ==
- 1977: Duets (Rounder)
- 1977: The Greenbriar Years (Old Homestead) with Joe Isaacs and Frank Wakefield
- 1979: Ramblin' (Rounder)
- 1982: Blue Rondo (Sierra)
- 1983: Swingrass '83 (Antilles) with Buell Neidlinger, Peter Erskine, Marty Krystall, Peter Ivers, Andy Statman, and Fred Tackett
- 1994: The Greene Fiddler (Sierra)
- 1995: The Grass Is Greener (Rebel)
- 1996: Wolves a' Howlin (Rebel) with The Grass Is Greener
- 1997: Sales Tax Toddle (Rebel) with The Grass Is Greener - Grammy nominated Bluegrass Record of the Year
- 2001: Hands Across The Pond (self-released) with Beryl Marriott
- 2006: Shufflin' (RGP Productions) with the Brothers Barton and Jeff Pekarek

== As a member of the Jim Kweskin Jug Band ==
- 1967: Garden of Joy (Reprise)

== As a member of Seatrain ==
- 1969: Sea Train (A&M)
- 1970: Seatrain (Capitol)
- 1971: The Marblehead Messenger (Capitol)

== As a member of Muleskinner ==
- 1973: Muleskinner (Warner Bros.) reissued in 1994 as A Potpourri of Bluegrass Jam on the Sierra label
- 1973: Muleskinner Live: Original Television Soundtrack (Micro Werks) released in 1998

== As a member of the Greene String Quartet ==
- 1988: Molly On The Shore (Hannibal
- 1991: The String Machine (Virgin)
- 1995: Bluegreene (Virgin)

== As composer ==
- 1979: David Grisman - Hot Dawg (Horizon) - track 4, "Dawgology" (co-written with David Grisman)

== Also appears on ==
=== 1967 - 1969 ===
- 1967: Bill Monroe - Blue Grass Time (Decca)
- 1968: Ramblin' Jack Elliott - Young Brigham (Reprise)
- 1968: The Blues Project - Planned Obsolescence (Verve)
- 1969: The Blue Velvet Band - Sweet Moments With The Blue Velvet Band (Warner Bros. / Seven Arts)
- 1969: Brewer & Shipley - Weeds (Kama Sutra)
- 1969: Gary Burton - Throb (Atlantic)
- 1969: Pearls Before Swine - These Things Too (Reprise)

=== 1970 - 1971 ===
- 1970: Big Brother and the Holding Company - Be a Brother (Columbia)
- 1970: John Hall - Action (Columbia)
- 1970: Paul Siebel - Woodsmoke and Oranges (Elektra)
- 1970: Alice Stuart - Full Time Woman (Fantasy)
- 1971: Paul Siebel - Jack-Knife Gypsy (Elektra) - violin on track 4, "Prayer Song"
- 1971: James Taylor - Mud Slide Slim and the Blue Horizon (Warner Bros.) - violin on track 4, "Riding On A Railroad"

=== 1972 - 1974 ===
- 1972: Fat City - Welcome to Fat City (Paramount Records)
- 1972: Artie Kaplan - Confessions of a Male Chauvinist Pig (Hopi) - violin on track 4, "God Fearin' Man"
- 1972: Al Kooper - Naked Songs (Columbia) - violin on track 4, "Blind Baby"
- 1972: New Riders of the Purple Sage Gypsy Cowboy (Columbia)
- 1972: Rowan Brothers - Rowan Brothers (Columbia)
- 1973: Fraser & deBolt - With Pleasure (Columbia) - violin on track 7, "Two Rainbows"
- 1973: Maria Muldaur - Maria Muldaur (Reprise)
- 1973: Wendy Waldman - Love Has Got Me (Warner Bros.)
- 1974: Gene Clark - No Other (Asylum)
- 1974: Jerry Garcia - Garcia (Round)
- 1974: Kenny Rankin - Silver Morning (Little David)
- 1974: Thomas Jefferson Kaye - First Grade (ABC/Dunhill) - violin on track 7, "Shine The Light"

=== 1975 - 1977 ===
- 1975: Loggins & Messina - So Fine (Columbia)
- 1975: Danny O'Keefe - So Long Harry Truman (Atlantic) - violin on track 8, "Fiddler's Jamboree"
- 1975: Loudon Wainwright III - Unrequited (CBS)
- 1976: David Soul - David Soul (Private Stock)
- 1976: Loggins & Messina - Native Sons (|Columbia)
- 1976: Melanie - Photograph (Atlantic)
- 1977: Country Gazette - What A Way To Make A Living (Transatlantic)
- 1977: Jonathan Edwards - Sailboat (Warner Bros.)
- 1977: Emmylou Harris - Pieces of the Sky (Reprise) - violin on track 1, "Bluebird Wine"
- 1977: Hoyt Axton - Music from Outlaw Blues (Capitol)
- 1977: Tony Rice - Tony Rice (Rounder)
- 1977: David Soul - Playing to an Audience of One (Private Stock)
- 1977: Rod Stewart - Foot Loose & Fancy Free (Warner Bros.) - violin on track 3, " You're In My Heart"

=== 1978 - 1979 ===
- 1978: Rodney Crowell - Ain't Living Long Like This (Warner Bros.)
- 1978: Joe Farrell - Night Dancing (Warner Bros.)
- 1978: Shawn Phillips - Transcendence (RCA) - violin on track 5, "Good Evening Madam"
- 1978: Peter Rowan - Peter Rowan (Flying Fish Records|Flying Fish)
- 1978: Livingston Taylor - Three Way Mirror (Epic) - violin on track 3, "Gonna Have a Good Good Time"
- 1979: Peter McCann - One on One (Columbia) - mandolin on track 3, "Come By Here"
- 1979: Jakob Magnússon - Special Treatment (Warner Bros.)
- 1979: Tony Rice Unit - Acoustics (Kaleidoscope)
- 1979: Peter Rowan - Hiroshima Mon Amour (Better Days/Nippon Columbia)
- 1979: Toni Brown - Toni Brown (Fantasy) - mandolin on track 5, "Dance Me"

=== 1980 - 1984 ===
- 1980: Peter Rowan - Bluegrass Album (Better Days/Nippon Columbia)
- 1980: Tony Rice Unit - Mar West (Rounder)
- 1982: Toni Basil - Word of Mouth (Chrysalis) - violin on track 2, "Rock On"
- 1982: Tony Rice Unit - Backwaters (album) (Rounder)
- 1983: Buellgrass - Big Day at Ojai (K2B2 Records)
- 1984: Tony Elman - Shakin' Down the Acorns, Vol. 2 (Acorn Music)
- 1984: Peter Rowan - Peter Rowan with The Red Hot Pickers (Sugar Hill)
- 1984: Rank and File - Long Gone Dead (Slash Records / Warner Bros.)
- 1985: The Blasters - Hard Line (Warner Bros.) - violin on track 5, "Little Honey"

=== 1985 - 1989 ===
- 1985: Peter Rowan - The First Whippoorwill (Sugar Hill)
- 1986: Phil Alvin - Un "Sung Stories" (London) - violin on track 9, "Collins Cave"
- 1986: Henry Butler - Fivin' Around (MCA)
- 1986: Peter Case - Peter Case (Geffen) - violin on track 6, "Small Town Spree"
- 1986: Stan Ridgway - The Big Heat (I.R.S.) - violin on track 2, "Pick It Up (And Put It In Your Pocket)"
- 1989: Tony Elman - Swinging on a Gate (Acorn Music)
- 1989: Stan Ridgway - Mosquitos (I.R.S.) - electric violin on track 3, "Goin' Southbound"

=== 1990 - 1994 ===
- 1990: Steve Wynn - Kerosene Man (Rhino)
- 1991: Del Shannon - Rock On! (MCA / Silvertone) - violin on track 10, "Let's Dance"
- 1991: Bob Seger and the Silver Bullet Band - The Fire Inside (Capitol) violin on track 11, "Blind Love"
- 1991: Rod Stewart - Vagabond Heart (Warner Bros.) - violin on track 6, "You Are Everything"
- 1992: Jude Cole - Start the Car (Reprise) - violin on track 8, "First Your Money (Then Your Clothes)"
- 1992: Tamiya Lynn - Tamiya Lynn (Liberty)
- 1992: Steve Wynn - Dazzling Display (Rhino)
- 1993: E - Broken Toy Shop (Polydor) - violin on track 7.1, "Mass"
- 1993: Texas - Ricks Road (Vertigo) - violin on track 3, "Listen To Me"
- 1993: Andreas Vollenweider - Eolian Minstrel (Columbia) - violin on track 3, "Reason Enough (All The King's Men)"
- 1994: Peter Rowan and the Rowan Brothers - Tree on a Hill (Sugar Hill)

=== 1995 - present ===
- 1995: Melissa Manchester - If My Heart Had Wings (Atlantic) violin on track 7, "Higher Ground"
- 1995: Curtis Stigers - Time Was (Arista)
- 1995: Tony Trischka - World Turning (Rounder) - violin on track 5, "Ladies Of Refinement"
- 1995: Brian Wilson and Van Dyke Parks - Orange Crate Art (Warner Bros.)
- 1996: Herbie Hancock - The New Standard (Verve)
- 1998: Rod Stewart - When We Were the New Boys (Warner Bros.) - violin on track 6, "Hotel Chambermaid"
- 2000: various artists - The Original Dueling Banjos (CMH)
- 2001: Mandy Moore - Mandy Moore (Epic) violin on track 6, "Cry"
- 2002: Linda Thompson - Fashionably Late (Rounder) - violin on track 2, "Miss Murray"
- 2006: Maria Muldaur - Sings Love Songs of Bob Dylan - Heart of Mine (Telarc)
- 2006: various artists - Rogue's Gallery: Pirate Ballads, Sea Songs, and Chanteys (ANTI-)
