= Seatrain =

Seatrain may refer to:

- Seatrain Lines, a defunct U.S. shipping company
- Seatrain shipbuilding, a shipbuilding subsidiary of Seatrain Lines
- Seatrain (band), a late 1960s – early 1970s roots-fusion band
  - Sea Train (album), a 1969 album by the band Seatrain
  - Seatrain (album), a 1970 album by the band Seatrain
- Sea Train, a type of conveyance in the One Piece manga
- Sea Train, a formerly unidentified sound

== See also ==
- C-Train, a light rail transit system in Calgary, Canada
