= The Great American Eagle Tragedy =

Studio album by Earth Opera
- Released: 1969
- Recorded: 1969
- Genre: Psychedelic rock
- Label: Elektra
- Producer: Peter K. Siegel

Earth Opera chronology
Earth Opera (1968)	The Great American Eagle Tragedy (1969)

David Grisman chronology
Earth Opera (1968)	The Great American Eagle Tragedy (1969)	Muleskinner (1973)

Peter Rowan chronology
Earth Opera (1968)	The Great American Eagle Tragedy (1969)	Seatrain (1970)

Professional ratings
Review scores
Source	Rating
AllMusic	4/5 stars

The Great American Eagle Tragedy is the second and last album by the psychedelic band Earth Opera, recorded in 1969. It is marked by departure of Bill Stevenson and his harpsichord sound, using more guest musicians than on the debut album and use of pedal steel by Bill Keith. The album also had better success on charts then the previous one, but soon after, the group disbanded, paving the way for solo careers mainly for Pete Rowan and David Grisman.

== Chart performance ==
The album debuted on Billboard magazine's Top LP's chart in the issue dated March 22, 1969, peaking at No. 181 during a four-week run on the chart.

== Track listing ==
All compositions by Peter Rowan, unless otherwise noted

1. "Home to You" – 4:27
2. "Mad Lydia's Waltz" – 3:47
3. "Alfie Finney" — (Paul Dillon) – 2:35
4. "Sanctuary From the Law" – 2:54
5. "All Winter Long" – 5:56
6. "The American Eagle Tragedy" – 10:36
7. "Roast Beef Love" – 3:16
8. "It's Love" – 4:05

== Personnel ==
- Peter Rowan – vocals, guitar, saxophone
- David Grisman – mandolin, mandocello, keyboards, saxophone, vocals
- Paul Dillon – guitar, drums, vocals
- Billy Mundi – percussion, drums
- John Nagy – bass, violoncello, mandocello
- Jack Bonus – flute, sax, wind
- Herb Bushler – bass
- John Cale – guitar, viola, vocals
- Richard Grando – saxophone
- David Horowitz – organ, piano, keyboards
- Bill Keith – pedal steel, steel guitar
- Bob Zachary – percussion, triangle

== Charts ==
Chart (1969)	Peak position
US Billboard Top LPs	181
