= Watch (Seatrain album) =

Studio album by Seatrain
- Released: 1973
- Recorded: 1973
- Genre: Folk rock; progressive folk; roots rock; progressive rock
- Label: Warner Bros.
- Producer: Buell Neidlinger

Seatrain chronology
The Marblehead Messenger (1971)	Watch (1973)

Watch is the fourth and final album of the band Seatrain, recorded in 1973. It is marked with the departure of Peter Rowan and Richard Greene (they formed the band Muleskinner) and the use of more session musicians on instruments like vibraphone, cello, accordion, tuba and oboe. Original members Andy Kulberg and Jim Roberts still remained with the group, though Roberts only contributed to three of the album's nine tracks.

== Reception ==
Professional ratings
Review scores
Source	Rating
Allmusic	3/5 stars

In a brief retrospective review, Allmusic called Watch "A strange, but intriguing release."

== Track listing ==
1. "Pack of Fools" (Andy Kulberg, Jim Roberts) 4:35
2. "Freedom Is the Reason" (Kulberg, Roberts) 4:15
3. "Bloodshot Eyes" (Lloyd Baskin) 3:00
4. "We Are Your Children Too" (Baskin) 3:42
5. "Abbeville Fair" (Kulberg, Richard Greene) 4:54
6. "North Coast" (Kulberg, Roberts) 4:23
7. "Scratch" (Kulberg) 3:45
8. "Watching the River Flow" (Bob Dylan) 3:23
9. "Flute Thing" (Al Kooper) 7:52

== Personnel ==
- Julio Coronado - drums
- Bill Elliot - keyboards, accordion
- Lloyd Baskin - keyboards, vocals
- Andy Kulberg - bass, flute, vocals
- Peter Walsh - guitar, bass, vocals
- Jim Roberts - vibraphone

with

- Bill Keith - banjo
- Wayne Daley - vocals
- Paul Prestopino - dobro, acoustic guitar
- Jill Shires - flute
- Douglas Davis - cello
- Bonnie Douglas - violin
- Myra Kestenbaum - viola
- Sandra Lee - vocals
- Buell Neidlinger - bass
- Sha Na Na - vocals
- Paul Shure - violin
- Bob Stuart - tuba
- Allan Vogel - oboe
