= Muleskinner =

A muleskinner or mule skinner is a muleteer or mule-driver.

It is also an antiquated military slang term for a cavalryman.

Muleskinner may also refer to:

- Muleskinners, a nickname for members of the 10th Sustainment Brigade
- Mule Skinner, the mascot of St. John's Military School, Kansas, U.S.
- Muleskinner, an alternate title for the album Jack Takes the Floor by Ramblin' Jack Elliott
- Muleskinner (band), a bluegrass band
  - Muleskinner (album), the eponymous debut album by the bluegrass band Muleskinner
- "Mule Skinner Blues", a song by Jimmie Rodgers
