= Muleskinner (album) =

A Potpourri of Bluegrass Jam

Studio album by Muleskinner
- Released: 1973
- Recorded: 1973
- Genres: Bluegrass, progressive bluegrass
- Length: 34:26
- Label: Warner Bros.
- Producers: Richard Greene, Joe Boyd

Muleskinner chronology
A Potpourri of Bluegrass Jam (1973)	Original Television Soundtrack (1998)

David Grisman chronology
The Great American Eagle Tragedy (1969)	Muleskinner (1973)	Old & In the Way (1975)

Peter Rowan chronology
Seatrain (1970)	Muleskinner (1973)	Old & In the Way (1975)

1994 reissue cover

Professional ratings
Review scores
Source	Rating
AllMusic	4.5/5 stars
Rolling Stone	4/5 stars

Muleskinner is the eponymous debut album by the progressive bluegrass group Muleskinner, recorded at the Record Plant, Hollywood, California, between March 27 and April 14, 1973, and released later that year. It is their only studio album. The album was re-released by Ridge Runner in 1978 and re-issued on compact disc in 1994 under the title A Potpourri of Bluegrass Jam, which was a banner on the front cover of the original album release.

Muleskinner reunited David Grisman and Peter Rowan, who had previously played together in the band, Earth Opera. They, along with bassist John Kahn, would go on to form Old & In the Way after Muleskinner disbanded.

Shortly after the release of the album, guitarist Clarence White died, and the album was subsequently dedicated to him. The band released a live album in 1998 (recorded in 1973) and reunited for a couple of one-off performances.

== Track listing ==
1. "Muleskinner Blues" (Rodgers, Vaughn) – 3:16
2. "Blue and Lonesome" (Jacobs) – 3:18
3. "Footprints in the Snow" (Miller, Elliott) – 3:34
4. "Dark Hollow" (Browning) – 2:48
5. "Whitehouse Blues" (Traditional arr. Greene) – 2:18
6. "Opus 57 in G Minor" (Grisman) – 2:26
7. "Runways of the Moon" (Roberts, Rowan) – 4:23
8. "Roanoke" (Ahr) – 1:49
9. "Rain and Snow" (trad., arr. Rowan) – 4:10
10. "Soldier's Joy" (trad., arr. White) – 2:15
11. "Blue Mule" (Rowan) – 4:28

== Personnel ==
- Peter Rowan – vocals, guitar
- Bill Keith – banjo, pedal steel
- Clarence White – acoustic guitar, electric guitar, vocals
- Richard Greene – violin, vocals
- David Grisman – mandolin, vocals
- John Guerin – drums
- John Kahn – bass
