= Mike Lilly =

Mike Lilly may refer to:

- Mike Lilly (comics)
- Mike Lilly (musician)
