= The Walls of Time =

Studio album by Peter Rowan
- Released: November 1982
- Recorded: 1982
- Genre: Bluegrass
- Length: 43:26
- Label: Sugar Hill
- Producer: Peter Rowan/Hiroshi Asada/Richard Greene

Peter Rowan chronology
| Peter Rowan & The Wild Stallions (1981) | The Walls of Time (1982) | Red Hot Pickers (1984) |

Professional ratings
Review scores
| Source | Rating |
|---|---|
| Allmusic | 3/5 stars |

The Walls of Time is the fourth solo album by country rock / bluegrass musician Peter Rowan. The album contains a solid set of mostly bluegrass compositions. Guest musicians include Jerry Douglas, Ricky Skaggs, Sam Bush, Tony Trischka, and Peter's brother Lorin Rowan.

The tracks "Old, Old House", "Hiroshima Mon Amour," and "Willow Garden," all originally released on Peter Rowan with The Red Hot Pickers, were added to the 1993 CD re-release, presumably to fill out the play time to encourage sales of the CD. These tracks, added to the CD where the A-side on the LP ended, are not strictly part of the album.

== Track listing ==
1. "Roving Gambler" (Traditional) - 2:43
2. "Lone Pilgrim" (Traditional) - 2:53
3. "Raglan Road (Dawning of the Day)" (P.Kavanagh/K.Kavanagh) - 3:40
4. "Going Up on the Mountain" (Traditional) - 2:48
5. "Casey's Last Ride" (Kris Kristofferson) - 4:05
6. "Old, Old House" (George Jones/Hal Bynum) - 3:12 (**)
7. "Hiroshima Mon Amour" (Peter Rowan) - 3:39 (**)
8. "Willow Garden" (Traditional) - 2:48 (**)
9. "Moonshiner" (Traditional) - 2:57
10. "Thirsty in the Rain" (Peter Rowan) - 3:04
11. "Walls of Time" (Peter Rowan/Bill Monroe) - 4:27
12. "Plains of Waterloo" (Traditional) - 7:10

(**) Denotes Bonus Tracks included on 1993 CD release.

== Personnel ==
- Peter Rowan - guitar, mandolin, lead vocals
- Ricky Skaggs - mandolin, violin, mandola, tenor vocals
- Sam Bush - fiddle, violin, mandolin
- Lorin Rowan - guitar, piano, harmony vocals
- Jerry Douglas - dobro
- Tony Trischka - banjo
- Roger Mason - bass
- Richard Greene - fiddle, violin, mandolin
- Eddie Adcock - banjo, baritone vocals
- Alan O'Bryant - banjo, tenor vocals
- Lightning Chance - bass, bass vocals
- Andy Statman - mandolin
- Triona Ni Dhomhnaill - keyboards, clavinet

== Production ==
- Producer: Peter Rowan/Hiroshi Asada/Richard Greene/Jim Rooney
- Recording Engineer: Hiroshi Gotoh/Richard Greene/Neil Wilburn
- Mixing: Hiroshi Gotoh/Richard Greene
- Cover Design: Raymond Simone
- Photography: Michael Maggid
