= Beacon Banjo Company =

Manufacturer of banjo tuners

- Industry: Musical instrument accessories
- Founded: January 1964
- Founders: Bill Keith; Dan Bump
- Headquarters: Woodstock, New York, United States
- Products: D-tuners (Keith tuners)
- Website: www.beaconbanjo.com

The Beacon Banjo Company of Woodstock, New York was founded in January 1964 by banjo player Bill Keith and his college friend Dan Bump to manufacture and market their new D-tuners, now commonly called Keith tuners. With these tuners, banjo players can change pitches accurately while playing.

== History ==
Their inspiration for going into the banjo business was Earl Scruggs' creation of homemade cam tuners, which he developed after recording "Earl's Breakdown" in 1951. Scruggs had sought to refine the way he played this song by finding a way to re-tune more accurately during the piece. Keith was inspired by the four banjo songs ("Earl's Breakdown", "Foggy Mountain Chimes", "Flint Hill Special", and "Randy Lynn Rag") on the 1957 Flatt and Scruggs album Foggy Mountain Jamboree, which all used Scruggs's cam tuning machines.

In about four hours one day in 1963, Keith and Bump drew the prototype for a more streamlined version of Scruggs's tuners. In 1964, after showing the tuners to Scruggs, Keith and Bump went into business with a couple of thousand dollars and began assembling the tuners, which they had made locally, in Bump's garage.

The Beacon Banjo Company expanded the banjo's abilities by making these specialized tuners able to install on all four long strings, instead of — as with the cam tuning machines — only on the second and third strings.

Other people contributed to the creation of these tuners, including Walt Pittman, and Keith's friend Loring Hall. Hall is credited with making the first prototypes, while Pitman created "better-looking nuts, washers and thumbscrews to replace the 'off-the-shelf' hardware that Loring and Dan had." Earl Scruggs also partnered with Keith and Bump as a co-owner until around 1970, and his endorsement greatly helped to market these tuning machines.

Currently several companies make D tuners similar to Keith's. Gotoh and Schaller are among the top selling copies. According to the company's Web site, they supply Gibson, Stelling, Fender, Deering, OME, and "... other makers and luthiers."

Throughout the years these tuners have had many names stamped on them, including "Scruggs-Keith-Bump," "Keith-Bump," and "Keith." To date the company has sold over 30,000 pairs.
