= Mike Lilly (musician) =

American banjoist (1950–2020)

- Born: May 24, 1950; Harlan, Kentucky, U.S.
- Died: February 12, 2020 (aged 69); Dayton, Ohio, U.S.
- Occupations: Banjoist, singer
- Children: 2
- Parent(s): Robert "Bob" Lilly, Betty Lilly

Mike Lilly (May 24, 1950 – February 12, 2020) was an American banjoist and singer.

== Professional experiences in Bluegrass ==
Mike Lilly played with Larry Sparks from 1969 to 1973, together with the mandolin player Wendy Miller. According to Greg Cahill "it was one of Sparks' best early bands". Mike Lilly left the Larry Sparks' band for to join for one year the Country Gentlemen, at the time where Ricky Skaggs and Jerry Douglas were in the band. but he never recorded with them. From 1972 to 1976, Mike Lilly and Wendy Miller were playing together again in as the "Country Grass band". In 1976, they toured France and recorded several tracks for the album fr:Banjo Paris Session (Vol. 2, 1977), and in Christian Séguret With Bluegrass Friends (1976) which also features Bill Keith and Jim Rooney. In the 1980s, Mike Lilly played with his band Country Grass (House On The Hill, 1980), and then performed alongside Harley Allen for about five years (Suzanne, 1985). After that, Mike Lilly gave up music as a career and drived a semi-truck, long distance. He didn't return to professional Music until 2010, when he restarted the band “Country Grass” with his former partner, Wendy Miller.

== banjo style ==
For Greg Cahill:

[Mike Lilly is] one of the most creative and talented but lesser known banjo players in the world of bluegrass music today. His own unique style encompasses the chordal work of Don Reno, the drive of Earl Scruggs and the jazzy ideas of Eddie Adcock and Sonny Osborne, but it is clearly the Mike Lilly style of banjo playing.

Mike Lilly was featured in the “Masters of the 5-String Banjo” (featuring 69 great banjo players from around the world, by Pete Wernick & Tony Trischka).

== Discography ==
- Mike Lilly & Wendy Miller: LP Albums and contributions
  - 1972 New Grass Instrumentals (LP) Old Homestead Records, OHS 90017
  - 1973 Solid Grass (LP) Old Homestead Records, OHS 90029
  - 1975 Country Grass (LP) Old Homestead Records, OHS 90049
  - 1976 Hot-N-Grassy (LP) Old Homestead Records, OHS 90068
  - 1977 4x Contribution in: Banjo Paris Session Volume 2 (LP) Cezame, CEZ 1041 (Mike Lilly on tracks: A6, B1, B2, B3)
  - 1977 Vernon Mcintyre with Friends W.Miller & M.Lilly, Appalachian Grass (LP) Old Homestead Records, OHS 90080
- Mike Lilly And The Country Grass
  - 1980 The House On The Hill (LP ) Old Homestead Records, OHS 90128
  - 1985 Looking For A New Way To Go (LP) Old Homestead Records, OHS-90127
- Harley Allen & Mike Lilly
  - 1985 – Suzanne (LP) Folkways Records, FTS 31049
- with Larry Sparks And The Lonesome Ramblers
  - 1971 New Gospel Songs (LP) Pine Tree Records – PTSLP 507
  - 1972 Bluegrass Old And New (LP) Old Homestead Records, OHS 90004
  - 1972 Ramblin' Bluegrass (LP) Starday Records, 480–498
  - 1975 Pickin' & Singin' (LP) King Bluegrass Records, KB-519
  - 1975 Sparklin' Bluegrass (LP) King Bluegrass Records, KB-531
  - 1976 You Could Have Called (LP) King Bluegrass Records, KB 550
  - 1976 Thank You Lord (LP) Old Homestead Records, OHS 90060
  - 1982 Where The Dim Lights Are The Dimmest (LP) Old Homestead Records, OHS 90147
  - 1982 Dark Hollow, (LP, Compilations) Rebel Records, REB-1597
  - 1982 Best Of Larry Sparks And The Lonesome Ramblers (LP, Compilations) Rebel Records, REB-1609 (Mike Lilly on tracks: A1, A2, A6, B1, B2, B5)
  - 1983 The Testing Times (LP) Rebel Records REB-1611 (Mike Lilly on tracks: A4, B3)
