= Mark Murphy Sings the Nat "King" Cole Songbook, Volume One =

1983 studio album by Mark Murphy

Mark Murphy Sings the Nat King Cole Songbook, Volume One

Studio album by Mark Murphy
- Released: 1985
- Recorded: 1983
- Studio: Western Sound Studios, Kalamazoo, Michigan and Sage & Sound Studio, Hollywood, California
- Genre: Vocal jazz
- Length: 38:13
- Label: Muse Records
- Producer: Mark Murphy and Steve Zegree

Mark Murphy chronology
Living Room (1984)	Mark Murphy Sings the Nat King Cole Songbook, Volume One (1985)	Mark Murphy Sings Nat's Choice: The Nat "King" Cole Songbook, Volume Two (1985)

Mark Murphy Sings the Nat King Cole Songbook, Volume One is a studio album by Mark Murphy.

Mark Murphy Sings the Nat King Cole Songbook, Volume One is the 21st album by American jazz vocalist Mark Murphy. It was recorded when Murphy was 51 years old in 1983 and released by the Muse label in the United States in 1985. This album is collection of songs associated with Nat King Cole. Murphy received his third Grammy Award nomination for his performance.

== Background ==
In 1983 Murphy decided to record a tribute album to his teenage idol Nat King Cole. Murphy said, "Everybody else was a Sinatra freak, but I was a Nat King Cole freak...He was like rhythmic honey". Murphy said that Cole delivered, "the loosest, slipperiest vocals in the world". Murphy wrote in the liner notes, "This Nat King Cole Songbook is dedicated to his daughter Natalie and brother Freddie - two fabulous singers - but mostly to the memory of Nat's A&R man at Capitol Records, Lee Gillette. Lee was also a founding member of NARAS".

== Recording ==
The tracks were recorded in two sessions in October and November 1983 with Murphy and Steve Zegree producing. Each tune is recorded as a duet with a single instrument, either bass, piano or guitar. Murphy was attracted to the challenge of having his voice so very exposed in this rather stark approach to the songs. Murphy said the recording was a tribute, not a copy, "to my first influence, and to Nat's taste. Of course he could make everything sound good, but he also picked such wonderful songs". Murphy decided on many lesser known songs associated with Cole, and avoided many of his bigger hits.

Bob Magnusson, who appeared with Murphy on Bop for Kerouac, accompanies on bass on three tracks (1, 6, 8). The pianist and guitarist had not previously recorded with Murphy. Gary Schunk accompanies on piano on four tracks (3, 5, 9, 10). And Murphy is accompanied by guitarist Joseph LoDuca on three tracks (2, 4, 7).

== Reception ==
Professional ratings
Review scores
Source	Rating
The Virgin Encyclopedia of Popular Music	3/5 stars
AllMusic	4/5 stars

Scott Yanow assigns 4 stars to the album in the AllMusic Guide to Jazz. He said, "It would have been nice if all of the musicians could have played together a bit, but the strong material and Murphy's interpretive skills hold one's interest throughout...Murphy mostly avoided the obvious hits, opting for particularly strong material that fits his chance-taking style".

Colin Larkin assigns 3 stars to the album in The Virgin Encyclopedia of Popular Music. (3 stars means, "Good: a record of average worth, but one that might possess considerable appeal for fans of a particular style").

Murphy biographer Peter Jones singles out "These Foolish Things" as "one of the most affecting songs on the album".

Murphy was nominated for a Grammy award for Best Jazz Vocal Performance, Male at the 28th Annual Grammy Awards for his performance on Mark Murphy Sings Nat's Choice – The Nat "King" Cole Songbook Volume I. He lost to Bobby McFerrin and Jon Hendricks for Another Night in Tunisia.

== Track listing ==
1. "Nature Boy / Calypso Blues" (Eden Ahbez / Nat King Cole, Don George) – 5:56
2. "Love Letters / Serenata" (Victor Young, Edward Heyman / Leroy Anderson, Mitchell Parish) – 3:39
3. "Oh You Crazy Moon" (Jimmy Van Heusen, Johnny Burke) – 3:38
4. "’Tis Autumn" (Henry Nemo) – 4:13
5. "I Keep Goin’ Back To Joe's" (Marvin Fisher, Jack Segal) – 4:18
6. "Tangerine" (Victor Schertzinger, Johnny Mercer) – 3:50
7. "Lush Life" (Billy Strayhorn) – 4:22
8. "Until the Real Thing Comes Along / Baby, Baby All the Time" (Sammy Cahn, Saul Chaplin, L.E. Freeman, Mann Holiner, Alberta Nichols / Bobby Troup) – 6:20
9. "Never Let Me Go" (Jay Livingston, Ray Evans) – 3:32
10. "These Foolish Things" (Jack Strachey, Harry Link, Holt Marvell) – 4:17

== Personnel ==
Performance

- Mark Murphy – vocals
- Bob Magnusson – bass (tracks 1, 6, 8)
- Gary Schunk – piano (tracks 3, 5, 9, 10)
- Joseph LoDuca – guitar (2, 4, 7)

Production

- Jim Mooney – engineer, (tracks 1, 6, 8) at Sage & Sound Studio, Hollywood, California November 1, 1983
- Dean Lathrop – engineer, (except 1, 6, 8) at Western Sound Studios, Kalamazoo, Michigan October 8–10, 1983
- Mark Murphy – producer
- Steve Zegree – producer
- Dick Smith – art direction
- Neil Tesser – liner notes
- Joe Brescio – mastering at The Cutting Room, New York City
