= Skate Board Park =

Studio album by Joe Farrell
- Released: 1979
- Recorded: 29 January 1979
- Genre: Jazz
- Length: 37:26
- Label: Xanadu
- Producer: Don Schlitten

Joe Farrell chronology
Night Dancing (1978)	Skate Board Park (1979)	Sonic Text (1980)

Skate Board Park is a jazz album by the American musician Joe Farrell. Released by Xanadu Records, it was recorded in January 1979.

== Critical reception ==
Professional ratings
Review scores
Source	Rating
AllMusic	3/5 stars
The Rolling Stone Jazz Record Guide	3/5 stars

The Hartford Courant called the album "a first-rate, straight-ahead session which features both his imposing playing skills and his knack for writing tunes."

== Track listing ==
1. "Skate Board Park" (Joe Farrell) – 5:24
2. "Cliche Romance" (Farrell) – 6:58
3. "High Wire -- The Aerialist" (Chick Corea) – 6:17
4. "Speak Low" (O. Nash, K. Weill) – 5:44
5. "You Go to My Head" (J. F. Coots, H. Gillespie) – 6:39
6. "Bara-Bara" (Farrell) – 6:24

== Personnel ==
- Chick Corea – piano, electric piano
- Joe Farrell – tenor sax
- Bob Magnusson – bass
- Larance Marable – drums

Recording

- Arne Frager – engineer
- Paul Goodman – mixing
- Joe Farrell – liner notes
- Don Schlitten – design, photography, producer
