= Gordon Titcomb =

American multi-instrumentalist, studio musician and composer

Gordon Titcomb is an American multi-instrumentalist, studio musician and composer, Titcomb tours with Arlo Guthrie playing banjo, mandolin and pedal steel guitar. He has also toured and performed with Hank Williams Jr., Paul Simon, Judy Collins, Willie Nelson and Shawn Colvin.

Titcomb was born in Connecticut and has composed music for Disney, HBO, ESPN and The Maury Povich Show. His book for children The Last Train based on his song of the same name, includes paintings by Wendell Minor and an introduction by Arlo Guthrie.

== Discography ==
- The Last Train with Arlo Guthrie,Mike Auldridge and Bill Keith 2005 Rising Son Records

== Bibliography ==
- The Last Train, Roaring Brook Press, 14 September 2010, ISBN 9781596431645
