= Sonic Text =

Studio album by Joe Farrell
- Released: 1980
- Recorded: November 27 & 28, 1979
- Studio: Contemporary Records, Los Angeles, CA
- Genre: Jazz
- Length: 45:03
- Label: Contemporary; C 14002
- Producer: John Koenig

Joe Farrell chronology
Skate Board Park (1979)	Sonic Text (1980)	Farrell’s Inferno (1980)

Sonic Text is an album by American jazz saxophonist Joe Farrell, recorded in 1979 and released on the Contemporary label.

== Reception ==
The AllMusic review called the album "an excellent straight-ahead outing," stating that "the concise solos make expert use of every note, and the results are both fresh and swinging".

Professional ratings
Review scores
Source	Rating
AllMusic	4/5 stars
The Penguin Guide to Jazz Recordings	3.5/4 stars
The Rolling Stone Jazz Record Guide	3/5 stars

== Track listing ==
All compositions by Joe Farrell except as indicated

1. "Sonic Text" - 6:27
2. "When You're Awake" - 7:11
3. "The Jazz Crunch" (Freddie Hubbard) - 8:16
4. "If I Knew Where You're At" - 6:56
5. "Sweet Rita Suite (Part 1): Her Spirit" (George Cables) - 4:25
6. "Malibu" - 11:48

== Personnel ==
- Joe Farrell - tenor saxophone, soprano saxophone, flute
- Freddie Hubbard - trumpet, flugelhorn
- George Cables - piano, electric piano
- Tony Dumas - bass, electric bass
- Peter Erskine - drums
