= Night Dancing =

Studio album by Joe Farrell
- Released: 1978
- Genre: Jazz-funk
- Label: Warner Bros.
- Producer: Trevor Lawrence

Joe Farrell chronology
La Cathedral Y El Toro (1978)	Night Dancing (1978)	Skate Board Park (1979)

Professional ratings
Review scores
Source	Rating
Allmusic	2/5 stars

Night Dancing is a jazz album by Joe Farrell on the Warner Bros. label. It was released in 1978.

== Track listing ==
=== Side one ===
1. "Katherine" (Jeff Lorber) – 6:36
2. "Silver Lace" (Joe Farrell) – 8:15
3. "How Deep Is Your Love" (Robin Gibb, Barry Gibb, Maurice Gibb) – 4:19
4. "Come Rain or Come Shine" (Harold Arlen, Johnny Mercer) – 3:24

=== Side two ===
1. "Another Star" (Stevie Wonder) – 5:30
2. "Casa De Los Sospensos" (Joe Farrell) – 7:30
3. "Night Dancing" (Trevor Lawrence) – 5:49
4. "You're in My Heart (The Final Acclaim)" (Rod Stewart) – 3:13

== Personnel ==
- Joe Farrell – Soprano and tenor saxophone, flute
- Herbie Hancock – Piano, electric piano
- Victor Feldman – Piano, electric piano
- Michael Boddicker – Synthesizer, Clavinet
- Lee Ritenour – Guitar
- Jay Graydon – Guitar
- Richard Greene & Beryl Marriott – Violin, viola
- Robert W. Daugherty – Bass
- Abraham Laboriel – Bass
- Mike Porcaro – Bass
- Chuck Rainey – Bass
- John Guerin – Drums
- Jeff Porcaro – Drums
- Harvey Mason, Sr. – Drums
- Airto Moreira – Percussion, cuica
- Paulinho Da Costa – Conga
- Joe Romano – Tenor saxophone
- Oscar Brashear – Trumpet
- Garnett Brown – Trombone
- Quitman Dennis – Baritone saxophone
- Chuck Findley – Trumpet
- Lew McCreary – Bass trombone
- Flora Purim – Vocals
- Andrea Robinson – Vocals

== Chart performance ==
Year	Chart	Position
1978	Billboard Jazz Albums	22
