= Mark Murphy Sings Nat's Choice: The Nat "King" Cole Songbook, Volume Two =

1983 studio album by Mark Murphy

Mark Murphy Sings Nat's Choice: The Nat King Cole Songbook, Volume Two

Studio album by Mark Murphy
- Released: 1985
- Recorded: 1983
- Studio: Western Sound Studios, Kalamazoo, Michigan and Sage & Sound Studio, Hollywood, California
- Genre: Vocal jazz
- Length: 33:41
- Label: Muse Records
- Producer: Mark Murphy and Steve Zegree

Mark Murphy chronology
Mark Murphy Sings the Nat "King" Cole Songbook, Volume One (1985)	Mark Murphy Sings Nat's Choice: The Nat King Cole Songbook, Volume Two (1985)	Beauty and the Beast (1986)

Mark Murphy Sings Nat's Choice: The Nat "King" Cole Songbook, Volume Two is a studio album by Mark Murphy.

Mark Murphy Sings Nat's Choice: The Nat "King" Cole Songbook, Volume Two is the 22nd album by American jazz vocalist Mark Murphy. It was recorded when Murphy was 51 years old in 1983 and released by the Muse label in the United States in 1985. This album is collection of songs associated with Nat King Cole.

== Background ==
In 1983 Murphy decided to record a tribute album to his teenage idol Nat King Cole. Murphy said, "Everybody else was a Sinatra freak, but I was a Nat King Cole freak...He was like rhythmic honey". Murphy said that Cole delivered, "the loosest, slipperiest vocals in the world". This album is a continuation of Mark Murphy Sings the Nat King Cole Songbook, Volume One and the tracks were recorded at the same sessions.

== Recording ==
The tracks were recorded in two sessions in October and November 1983 with Murphy and Steve Zegree producing. Each tune is recorded as a duet with a single instrument, either bass, piano or guitar. Murphy was attracted to the challenge of having his voice so very exposed in this rather stark approach to the songs. Michael Bourne wrote in the liner notes, "Murphy's voice, always a spectacular instrument in itself, is called upon to be even more virtuosic than ever". Murphy said the recording was a tribute, not a copy, "to my first influence, and to Nat's taste. Of course he could make everything sound good, but he also picked such wonderful songs". Murphy decided to record many lesser known songs associated with Cole, and avoided many of his bigger hits.

Bob Magnusson, who appeared with Murphy on Bop for Kerouac, accompanies on bass on two tracks (2, 8). The pianist and guitarist had not previously recorded with Murphy. Gary Schunk accompanies on piano on three tracks (1, 3, 6). And Murphy is accompanied by guitarist Joseph LoDuca on four tracks (4, 5, 6, 9).

== Reception ==
Professional ratings
Review scores
Source	Rating
AllMusic	3/5 stars
The Virgin Encyclopedia of Popular Music	3/5 stars

Scott Yanow assigns 3 stars to this release in the AllMusic Guide to Jazz. He said, "It would have been nice if all of the musicians could have played together a bit, but the strong material and Murphy's interpretive skills hold one's interest throughout...Murphy mostly avoided the obvious hits, opting for particularly strong material that fits his chance-taking style".

Colin Larkin assigns 3 stars to the album in The Virgin Encyclopedia of Popular Music. (3 stars means, "Good: a record of average worth, but one that might possess considerable appeal for fans of a particular style").

Murphy biographer Peter Jones said the recordings for Volume 2 were "more accessible" than Volume 1.

== Track listing ==
1. "Portrait of Jennie / Ruby" (J. Russel Robinson, Gordon Burdge / Heinz Roemheld, Mitchell Parish) – 5:01
2. "Walkin' My Baby Back Home / Breezin' Along With the Breeze" (Fred Ahlert, Roy Turk / Haven Gillespie, Seymour Simons, Richard A. Whiting) – 3:49
3. "For All We Know" (J. Fred Coots, Sam M. Lewis) – 3:32
4. "Maybe You’ll Be There" (Rube Bloom, Sammy Gallop) – 4:41
5. "Blue Gardenia" (Lester Lee, Bob Russell) – 3:04
6. "Don’t Let Your Eyes Go Shopping" (Billy Austin, Sheldon Smith) – 4:12
7. "More Than You Know" (Vincent Youmans, Edward Eliscu, Billy Rose) – 3:40
8. "Look Out for Love" (Danny Meehan, Colin Romoff) – 2:15
9. "The End of a Love Affair" (Billy Sherrill) – 3:27

== Personnel ==
Performance

- Mark Murphy – vocals
- Bob Magnusson – bass (tracks 2, 8)
- Gary Schunk – piano (tracks 1, 3, 6)
- Joseph LoDuca – guitar (tracks 4, 5, 6, 9)

Production

- Jim Mooney – engineer, (tracks 2, 8) at Sage & Sound Studio, Hollywood, California November 1, 1983
- Dean Lathrop – engineer, (except 2, 8) at Western Sound Studios, Kalamazoo, Michigan October 8–10, 1983
- Mark Murphy – producer
- Steve Zegree – producer
- Dick Smith – art direction
- Michael Bourne – liner notes
- Joe Brescio – mastering at The Cutting Room, New York City
