= The Marblehead Messenger =

Studio album by Seatrain
- Released: October 1971
- Recorded: 1971, Seaweed Studios, Marblehead, Massachusetts
- Genre: Folk rock; progressive folk; progressive rock; roots rock
- Length: 40:02
- Label: Capitol (original release); One Way (1992 CD reissue)
- Producer: George Martin

Seatrain chronology
Seatrain (1970)	The Marblehead Messenger (1971)	Watch (1973)

The Marblehead Messenger is the third album by the band Seatrain, recorded in 1971. As with Seatrain's previous album, it was produced by George Martin.

== Reception ==
Professional ratings
Review scores
Source	Rating
Allmusic	4.5/5 stars

Allmusic's brief retrospective review said the album was "better played and sung" and "much more of a band effort" than Seatrain.

== Track listing ==
1. "Gramercy" (Kulberg, Roberts) 2:59
2. "The State of Georgia's Mind" (Kulberg, Roberts) 4:01
3. "Protestant Preacher" (Rowan) 5:23
4. "Lonely's Not the Only Way to Go" (Baskin) 2:23
5. "How Sweet Thy Song" (Rowan) 5:00
6. "Marblehead Messenger" (Kulberg, Roberts) 2:40
7. "London Song" (Kulberg, Roberts) 4:20
8. "Mississippi Moon" (Rowan) 3:13
9. "Losing All the Years" (Kulberg, Roberts) 4:34
10. "Despair Tire" (Greene, Kulberg, Roberts) 5:29

== Personnel ==
- Peter Rowan – vocals, guitar
- Richard Greene – violin
- Lloyd Baskin – keyboards, vocals
- Andy Kulberg – bass, flute
- Larry Atamanuik – drums, percussion
- Jim Roberts – lyrics
