= Sea Train (album) =

Studio album by Seatrain
- Released: 1969
- Recorded: 1969
- Genre: Progressive folk; psychedelic folk; folk rock; progressive rock
- Length: 33:57
- Label: A&M (original release); Edsel (1986 UK reissue)
- Producer: Henry Lewy

Seatrain chronology
Sea Train (1969)	Seatrain (1970)

Professional ratings
Review scores
Source	Rating
AllMusic	3/5 stars
The Village Voice	C−

Sea Train is the debut album by the band Seatrain, recorded in 1969, and released on A&M Records. The band was created from the former members of Blues Project.

== Track listing ==
1. "Sea Train" (Kulberg, Roberts) 4:12
2. "Let the Duchess No" (Gregory, Roberts) 3:42
3. "Pudding Street" (Kulberg) 5:00
4. "Portrait of the Lady as a Young Artist" (Gregory, Roberts) 3:46
5. "As I Lay Losing" (Kulberg, Roberts) 5:00
6. "Rondo" (Gregory, Roberts) 3:29
7. "Sweet's Creek's Suite" (Kulberg) 3:56
8. "Outwear the Hills" (Kulberg, Roberts) 5:15

== Personnel ==
- Richard Greene - violin, backing vocals, keyboards, viola
- Roy Blumenfeld - drums, percussion
- John Gregory - guitar, lead vocals
- Don Kretmar - saxophone, bass
- Andy Kulberg - bass, backing vocals, flute
- Jim Roberts - lyrics, backing vocals
