= Meredith Axelrod =

American folk, jazz and blues singer

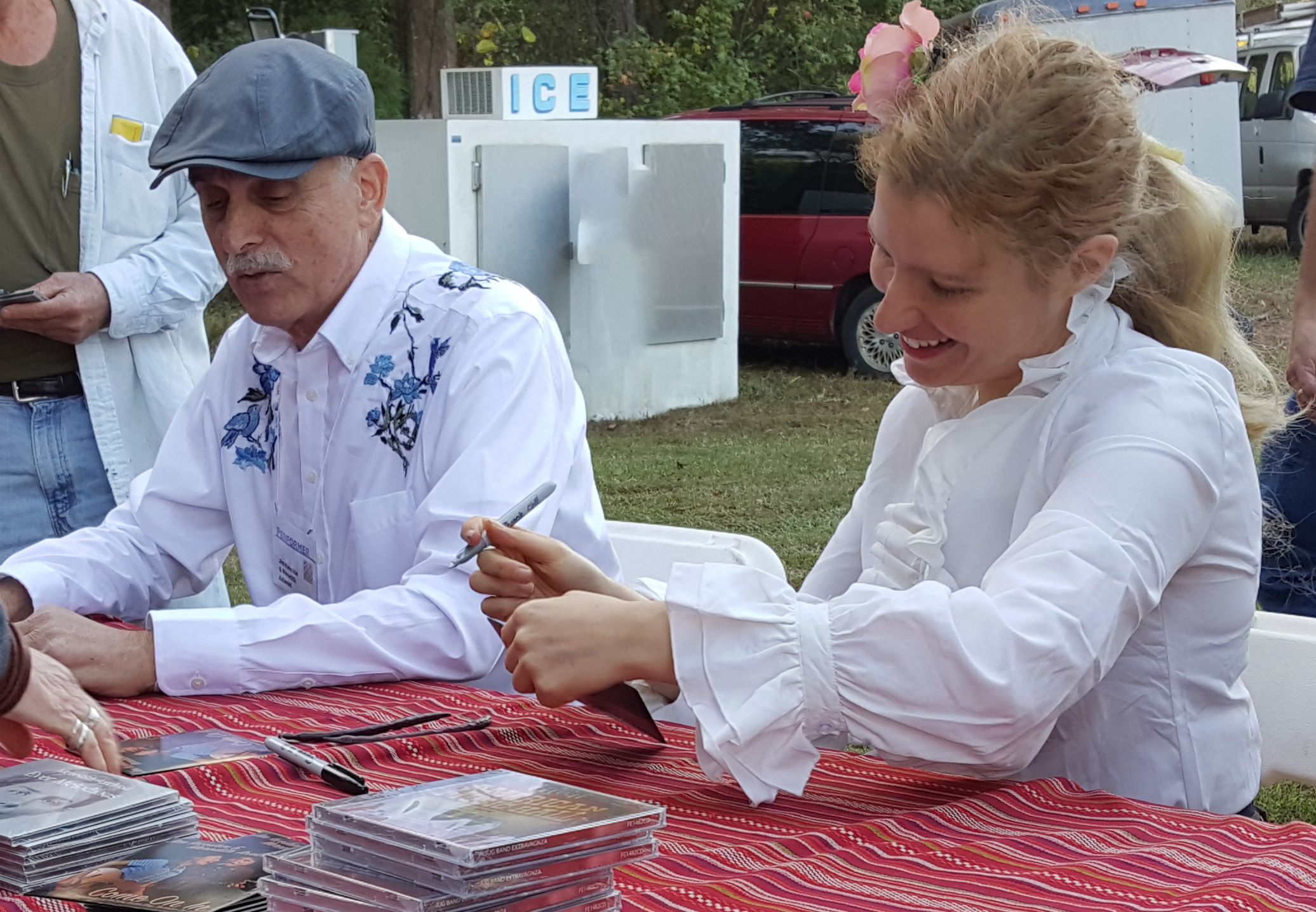
- Axelrod and Jim Kweskin autograph CDs at the Kentuck Festival of the Arts (Northport, Alabama, 2015).

Background information
- Born: Chicago, Illinois, U.S.
- Genres: Folk, blues
- Occupation: Singer
- Instruments: Vocals, guitar, glockenspiel, mouth trumpet, cello
- Website: meredithaxelrod.com

Meredith Axelrod is an American folk, jazz, and blues singer and multi-instrumentalist. She specializes in early-20th century American music. Known for touring with Jim Kweskin, she and he released the album, Come On In, in 2016.

In the 2000s, she met her partner Craig Ventresco while busking in San Francisco and it is with him that she performs most regularly. Fretboard Journal co-founder and editor, Jason Verlinde, has described him as "one of the music world’s best-kept secrets". And, regarding the pairing of Axelrod and Ventresco, he remarked, "Meredith’s playing is just revelatory. She has a voice that sounds like it was lifted straight off of a vaudeville stage; their chemistry is undeniable."

During the COVID-19 pandemic, Axelrod and Ventresco created a nightly livestream on Facebook, Instagram, and YouTube. Each day they have performed a half-hour set in their North Beach, San Francisco apartment's kitchen. Starting the day after the city instituted a stay-at-home order, they have "broadcast" daily for more than two years, producing nearly 1,000 shows (as of May 13, 2023), with very few breaks.

They are two of many musicians who have turned to alternative means to support themselves once the pandemic caused gigs to be canceled. As Ventresco said about viewers' donations to their virtual "tip jar", "It’s definitely helping us not to panic. Meredith put it best. We’re not getting rich, but we’re making about as much as we would at a gig. That’s really a big deal."
