= Medicine Trail =

Studio album by Peter Rowan
- Released: 1980
- Recorded: 1980
- Genre: Bluegrass
- Length: 42:28
- Label: Flying Fish
- Producer: Peter Rowan

Peter Rowan chronology
Texican Badman (1980)	Medicine Trail (1980)	Peter Rowan & The Wild Stallions (1981)

Medicine Trail is a solo album by country rock and bluegrass musician Peter Rowan. The guest musicians include Jerry Douglas, Ricky Skaggs, David Grisman, Mike Auldridge, Flaco Jimenez, and Peter's brother Lorin Rowan. Many songs are about the oppression of American Indians. Greg Irons provided some of the artwork.

== Critical reception ==
Professional ratings
Review scores
Source	Rating
AllMusic	3/5 stars
Chicago Tribune	3/4 stars
MusicHound Folk: The Essential Album Guide	3/5 stars

The Oakland Tribune noted that Rowan's "attractive tenor [is] accompanied by a fascinating array of musicians." The Chicago Tribune wrote that "Rowan's original compositions fuse bluegrass and folk with Tex-Mex and Native American forms."

== Track listing ==
1. "Riding High in Texas" (Peter Rowan) - 3:38
2. "My Foolish Pride" (Peter Rowan) - 3:04
3. "River of Stone" (Peter Rowan) - 6:05
4. "Revelation" (Peter Rowan) - 4:17
5. "Living on the Line" (Peter Rowan) - 2:54
6. "Medicine Trail" (Peter Rowan) - 4:59
7. "Blues Come Bother Me" (Peter Rowan) - 4:24
8. "Dreaming I Love You" (Peter Rowan) - 4:23
9. "Maui Mama" (Peter Rowan) - 4:21
10. "Prairie Lullabye" (Jimmie Rodgers / George Brown) - 4:49

== Personnel ==
- Peter Rowan - guitar, mandolin, vocals
- Lorin Rowan - guitar, piano, vocals
- David Grisman - mandolin, organ, piano
- Ricky Skaggs - guitar
- Mike Auldridge - dobro
- Jerry Douglas - dobro
- Jimmy Fuller - steel guitar
- Hugo Gonzales - banjo
- Flaco Jimenez - accordion
- Ozzie Ahlers - piano, vocals
- Roger Mason - bass, vocals
- Oscar Tellez - banjo, bajo sexto, 6-string bass
- Alan Hand - clarinet, piano
- Baird Banner - drums
- Isaac Garcia - drums
- Jon Sholle - guitar
- Estrella Berosini - vocals
- Maria Muldaur - vocals
- Buck White - vocals
- Cheryl White - vocals
- Sharon White - vocals

Production

- Producer: Peter Rowan
- Recording Engineer: Baird Banner/Bill Mackleroy/Marius Peron/Paul Wyckliffe
- Mixing: Brett Cohen/Roger Mason/Paul Wyckliffe
- Mastering: Kevin Gray
- Photography: Lisa Law
- Artwork/Lettering: Greg Irons
