= How Sweet It Is (Jerry Garcia Band album) =

Live album by Jerry Garcia Band
- Released: April 15, 1997
- Recorded: April–August 1990
- Genre: Rock
- Label: Grateful Dead Records
- Producers: John Cutler & Steve Parish

Jerry Garcia Band chronology
Jerry Garcia Band (1991)	How Sweet It Is (1997)	Don't Let Go (2001)

Jerry Garcia chronology
That High Lonesome Sound (1996)	How Sweet It Is (1997)	Breakdown (1997)

How Sweet It Is is the second live album by the Jerry Garcia Band. Like the band's self-titled first live release, it was recorded in the spring and summer of 1990 at The Warfield in San Francisco, California. It was released on CD in 1997, two years after Jerry Garcia's death. It was released as a two-disc LP on April 22, 2023.

== Critical reception ==
Professional ratings
Review scores
Source	Rating
Allmusic	3/5 stars
The Music Box	4/5 stars

On Allmusic, Stephen Thomas Erlewine said, "... How Sweet It Is captures the Jerry Garcia Band running through a selection of originals and covers. While it isn't as fluid or surprising as the double-disc 1991 set Jerry Garcia Band, which was culled from the same shows, it's nevertheless an entertaining set, especially for devoted fans, who will cherish previously unheard Garcia covers of songs like 'Think' and the title track."

In The Music Box, John Metzger wrote, "How Sweet It Is is the long-awaited follow-up to the two-disc Jerry Garcia Band set that was released in 1991. Culled from the same period of live performances, this effort delivers ten more songs that explore the magical relationship between Jerry Garcia, bassist John Kahn, and keyboardist Melvin Seals."

== Track listing ==
No.	Title	Writer(s)	Length
1.	"How Sweet It Is (To Be Loved by You)"	Brian Holland; Lamont Dozier; Eddie Holland	6:20
2.	"Tough Mama"	Bob Dylan	5:41
3.	"That's What Love Will Make You Do"	James Banks; Eddie Marion; Henderson Thigpen	8:03
4.	"Someday Baby"	Lightnin' Hopkins	8:54
5.	"Cats Under the Stars"	Jerry Garcia; Robert Hunter	8:59
6.	"Tears of Rage"	Dylan; Richard Manuel	7:54
7.	"Think"	Jimmy McCracklin; Deadric Malone	7:18
8.	"Gomorrah"	Garcia; Hunter	6:38
9.	"Tore Up Over You"	Hank Ballard	7:19
10.	"Like a Road Leading Home"	Don Nix; Dan Penn	10:12

== Recording dates ==
Recording dates
Title	Date
"How Sweet It Is (To Be Loved by You)"	April 13, 1990; Warfield Theatre, San Francisco, California
"Tough Mama"	April 13, 1990; Warfield Theatre, San Francisco, California
"That's What Love Will Make You Do"	April 14, 1990; Warfield Theatre, San Francisco, California
"Tore Up Over You"	April 14, 1990; Warfield Theatre, San Francisco, California
"Tears of Rage"	April 15, 1990; Warfield Theatre, San Francisco, California
"Someday Baby"	August 7, 1990; Warfield Theatre, San Francisco, California
"Cats Under the Stars"	August 7, 1990; Warfield Theatre, San Francisco, California
"Think"	August 7, 1990; Warfield Theatre, San Francisco, California
"Gomorrah"	August 7, 1990; Warfield Theatre, San Francisco, California
"Like a Road Leading Home"	August 8, 1990; Warfield Theatre, San Francisco, California

== Personnel ==
Jerry Garcia Band

- Jerry Garcia – guitar, vocals
- Melvin Seals – organ
- John Kahn – bass
- David Kemper – drums
- Gloria Jones – vocals
- Jackie LaBranch – vocals

Production

- Producers – John Cutler, Steve Parish
- Recording and mixing – John Cutler
- Engineers – Jeffrey Norman, Dave Roberts
- Mastering – Joe Gastwirt
- Sound – Mike Brady, Uwe Willenbacher
- Photography – Ken Friedman
- Cover photography - Mike Conway
- Design – Gecko Graphics
- Liner notes – Steve Silberman
