= Muleskinner Live: Original Television Soundtrack =

Live album by Muleskinner
- Released: February 24, 1998
- Recorded: February 13, 1973
- Genre: Bluegrass, progressive bluegrass
- Length: 40:20
- Label: Micro Werks
- Producer: John M. Delgatto, Michelle White

Muleskinner chronology
| Muleskinner (1973) | Muleskinner Live: Original Television Soundtrack (1998) |

David Grisman chronology
| Doc & Dawg (1997) | Muleskinner Live: Original Television Soundtrack (1998) | So What (1998) |

Peter Rowan chronology
| Breakdown (1997) | Muleskinner Live: Original Television Soundtrack (1998) | New Freedom Bell (1999) |

Alternative album cover

Professional ratings
Review scores
| Source | Rating |
|---|---|
| Allmusic | 4/5 stars |

Muleskinner Live: Original Television Soundtrack is a live album by the progressive bluegrass supergroup Muleskinner. It was recorded in 1973 and originally broadcast in the late 1970s, but the album was not released until 1998. Maria Muldaur provides harmony vocals on "Sitting Alone In The Moonlight".

== Track listing ==
1. New Camptown Races 2:53
2. Dark Hollow 2:34
3. Land of the Navajo 5:49
4. Blackberry Blossom 2:32
5. Knockin' on Your Door 3:08
6. Opus 57 in G Minor 2:03
7. Red Rocking Chair 3:25
8. Going to the Races 1:56
9. Eighth of January 2:44
10. I Am a Pilgrim 4:51
11. The Dead March 2:41
12. Sitting Alone in the Moonlight 2:42
13. Orange Blossom Special 4:44

== Personnel ==
- Peter Rowan – vocals, guitar
- Bill Keith – banjo
- Clarence White - acoustic guitar, vocals
- Richard Greene – violin
- David Grisman – mandolin, vocals
- Stuart Schulman – bass
- Maria Muldaur – harmony vocals, "Sitting Alone in the Moonlight"
