= Peter Rowan (album) =

Studio album by Peter Rowan
- Released: October 1978
- Recorded: 1978
- Genre: Country rock, folk rock
- Length: 36:45
- Label: Flying Fish
- Producer: Peter Rowan

Peter Rowan chronology
The Rowans (1975)	Peter Rowan (1978)	Texican Badman (1980)

Professional ratings
Review scores
Source	Rating
Allmusic	3/5 stars

Peter Rowan is the first solo album by the country rock / bluegrass musician Peter Rowan. Guest musicians are Peter's brother Lorin Rowan (piano), Flaco Jimenez (accordion), and Richard Greene (fiddle).

== Track listing ==
All tracks composed by Peter Rowan; except where indicated

1. "Outlaw Love" - 3:21
2. "Break My Heart Again" - 5:14
3. "A Woman in Love" - 2:21
4. "When I Was a Cowboy" (Lead Belly) - 2:38
5. "Land of the Navajo" - 6:19
6. "The Free Mexican Airforce" - 6:01
7. "Panama Red" - 3:01
8. "Midnight-Moonlight" - 4:13
9. "The Gypsy King's Farewell" - 4:15

== Personnel ==
- Peter Rowan - guitar, mandolin, mandola, vocals
- Lorin Rowan - guitar, piano, vocals
- Roger Mason - bass, fiddle, vocals
- Richard Greene - fiddle, violin
- Jimmy Fuller - steel guitar
- Flaco Jiménez - accordion
- Lamar Greer - banjo
- Paul Lenart - guitar, slide guitar
- Tex Logan - fiddle, violin
- Barry Mitterhoff - mandolin
- Buell Neidlinger - bass fiddle, fiddle
- Todd Phillips - bass fiddle, fiddle
- Jesse Ponce - banjo, bajo sexto, bass
- Mike Seeger - autoharp
- Estrella Berosini - vocals
- Alice Gerrard - vocals
- Laura Eastman - vocals

== Production ==
- Producer: Peter Rowan
- Recording Engineer: Sam Baroda/Gregg Lunsford/Jon Monday/John Nagy/Bob Shumaker
- Mixing: Gragg Lunsford
- Remix: the Mixing Lab August 17,18,19, 1978, Newton Mass. Gragg Lunsford, John Nagy; engineers
- Photography/Artwork: Hand painted photos: Lizzara Lennard
- Design: Thomas Ingalls
