= Seatrain (band) =

American band (1969–1973)

- Origin: Marin County, California, United States
- Genres: Folk rock; progressive folk; psychedelic folk; roots rock
- Years active: 1969–1973
- Labels: A&M, Capitol, Warner Bros., Edsel, One Way, Wounded Bird
- Past members: Andy Kulberg; Richard Greene; Lloyd Baskin; Peter Walsh; Bill Elliott; Peter Rowan; Julio Coronado; Larry Atamanuik; Jim Roberts; Don Kretmar; Elliot Randall; Red Shepherd; Teddy Irwin; Bobby Moses

Seatrain was an American band based initially in Marin County, California, and later in Marblehead, Massachusetts. Seatrain was formed in 1969, subsequently drawing some members from the Blues Project when it broke up. Seatrain recorded four albums and disbanded in 1973.

== Band history ==
Flutist/bassist Andy Kulberg and drummer Roy Blumenfeld of Blues Project formed the band with Jim Roberts, ex-Mystery Trend guitarist John Gregory, former member of Bill Monroe's Blue Grass Boys and Jim Kweskin Jug Band violinist/fiddler Richard Greene, and saxophonist Don Kretmar. Seatrain recorded their first album, Planned Obsolescence, in 1968, but had to release it as a Blues Project album for contractual reasons. In 1969, they released a self-titled LP (Sea Train), but faced a major change in membership a few months later.

The group's second self-titled album was released in late 1970 under the single-word name Seatrain. By then, Blumenfeld, Gregory, and Kretmar had been replaced by drummer Larry Atamanuik, keyboardist Lloyd Baskin, and Earth Opera guitarist and former Blue Grass Boy Peter Rowan. The album's "13 Questions" was released as a single and became a minor hit in the US, reaching No. 49 on Billboard's national chart in 1971, and No. 25 in Canada.

George Martin produced the album, marking the first time he had acted in that capacity with a rock act since his work with the Beatles. He also produced Seatrain's much-anticipated 1971 follow-up album, The Marblehead Messenger. In September Seatrain toured Great Britain for the first time, usually performing as a support act for Traffic. However, Rowan and Greene left the band soon after to form Muleskinner, while Roberts and Atamanuik joined the backing band of Emmylou Harris. Kulberg and Baskin replaced these members with guitarist Peter Walsh, keyboardist Bill Elliott, and drummer Julio Coronado, but released only one more album, 1973's Watch.

== Line-ups ==
=== 1968–1969 ===
- John Gregory – guitars, vocals
- Don Kretmar – saxophone, bass
- Richard Greene – violin
- Andy Kulberg – bass, flute
- Roy Blumenfeld – drums
- Jim Roberts – lyricist

=== 1969 ===
- Don Kretmar – saxophone, bass
- Richard Greene – violin
- Andy Kulberg – bass, flute
- Jim Roberts – lyricist
- Red Shepherd – vocals
- Teddy Irwin – guitars
- Bobby Moses – drums

=== 1969 ===
- Don Kretmar – saxophone, bass
- Richard Greene – violin
- Andy Kulberg – bass, flute
- Red Shepherd – vocals
- Elliot Randall – guitars
- Billy Williams – drums

=== 1969–1972 ===
- Richard Greene – violin
- Andy Kulberg – bass, flute
- Peter Rowan – guitars, vocals
- Lloyd Baskin – keyboards, vocals
- Larry Atamanuik – drums

=== 1972–1973 ===
- Andy Kulberg – bass, vocals, flute
- Lloyd Baskin – keyboards, vocals
- Peter Walsh – guitars
- Bill Elliott – keyboards
- Julio Coronado – drums

== Discography ==
- Sea Train (1969)
- Seatrain (1970) (No. 36 Canada)
- The Marblehead Messenger (1971)
- Watch (1973)
