= James Rooney =

James Rooney may refer to:

- James Rooney (Canadian politician) (1897–1969), member of the House of Commons of Canada
- James F. Rooney (born 1935), Wisconsin politician
- James Rooney (American football), American football coach
- Jimmy Rooney (born 1945), Scottish/Australian footballer
- Jim Rooney (soccer) (born 1968), American soccer player
- Jim Rooney (Scottish footballer) (born 1956), played for Queen's Park, Morton, St. Mirren, Dumbarton, Clyde and East Stirling
- Jim Rooney (music) (born 1938), American music producer

== See also ==
- Jamie Rooney (born 1980), English rugby league footballer
- Jamie Rooney (lacrosse) (born 1984), Canadian lacrosse player
- J.P. Rooneys, a professional football team named after Pennsylvania politician James P. Rooney
