= Bill Stevenson (Canadian musician) =

Canadian blues and jazz pianist

- Born: 1947 (age 78–79); Ottawa, Ontario, Canada
- Genres: Blues, jazz
- Occupations: Pianist, vocalist, songwriter
- Website: www.billstevensonmusic.ca

Bill Stevenson (born 1947) is a Canadian blues and jazz pianist, vocalist and songwriter, originally associated with the band Earth Opera, whose career in music has spanned over forty years.

== Biography ==
Stevenson commenced his music career in Ottawa, Ontario, where he spent his childhood and adolescence. While still in his teens, he joined the band Earth Opera, originally based in Boston. Stevenson left the band in 1968, after the release of their first album. During Stevenson's time with Earth Opera, the band frequently opened for The Doors, being fellow recording artists on Elektra Records, as well as having Jac Holzman as producer.

After leaving Earth Opera, Stevenson returned to Ottawa, where he continued to play locally for a number of years. One of his associations was as an early member of Heaven's Radio, considered to be one of the best bands to come out of Ottawa in the 1970s. As of the mid-1970s, Stevenson relocated to Halifax, Nova Scotia, from which his career has been based since. During his career, Stevenson has worked with many notable artists, including John Lee Hooker, Amos Garrett and Tom Rush.

Stevenson is the 2008 winner of the East Coast Music Award for Jazz Album of The Year. With Tom Easley and Geoff Arsenault, he is also a 2009 East Coast Music Award nominee for Blues Album of The Year.

== Discography ==
=== Earth Opera ===
- 1968 Earth Opera (Elektra)

=== Featured performer ===
- 1994 Shall we call it a night (Independent, with Tom Easley)
- 2006 For The Record (Independent; with Tom Easley)
- 2009 Nine Steps (Super High; with Tom Easley and Geoff Arsenault)

=== Contributions to others ===
- 1972 Tom Rush, Merrimack County (Columbia)
- 2003 Hot Toddy, Salty Sessions, Vol. 1 (Independent)
- 2004 Dutch Mason, Half Ain't Been Told (Pig Productions/CBC)
- 2004 Hot Toddy, Salty Sessions, Vol. 2 (Independent)
- 2005 Soundtrack contributions, The Life and Hard Times of Guy Terrifico, starring Kris Kristofferson
- 2008 Dancing Alone: Songs of William Hawkins (True North)
- 2015 Joel Plaskett and the Park Avenue Sobriety Test
