= Earth Opera (album) =

Studio album by Earth Opera
- Released: 1968
- Recorded: 1968
- Genre: Psychedelic rock
- Label: Elektra
- Producer: Peter K. Siegel

Earth Opera chronology
Earth Opera (1968)	The Great American Eagle Tragedy (1969)

David Grisman chronology
The Even Dozen Jug Band (1964)	Earth Opera (1968)	The Great American Eagle Tragedy (1969)

Peter Rowan chronology
Earth Opera (1968)	The Great American Eagle Tragedy (1969)

Professional ratings
Review scores
Source	Rating
Allmusic	3/5 stars

Earth Opera is the eponymous first studio album by the psychedelic rock band Earth Opera. It was recorded and released in 1968 on Elektra Records. The group featured Peter Rowan and David Grisman, who made their solo careers in much different genres than this record of mainly psychedelic music.

== Track listing ==
All compositions by Peter Rowan, unless otherwise noted

1. "The Red Sox are Winning" – 3:34
2. "As It Is Before" – 7:25
3. "Dreamless" – 2:52
4. "To Care at All" – 3:35
5. "Home of the Brave" – 4:51
6. "The Child Bride" – 4:43
7. "Close Your Eyes and Shut the Door" – 2:46
8. "Time and Again" (Grisman, Rowan) – 5:47
9. "When You Were Full of Wonder" – 4:00
10. "Death by Fire" – 6:08

== Personnel ==
- Peter Rowan – guitars, vocals
- David Grisman – mandolin, mandocello
- Bill Stevenson – piano, harpsichord, organ, vibraphone
- John Nagy – bass
- Paul Dillon – drums
- Billy Mundi – drums, percussion
- Warren Smith — drums, percussion
