= That High Lonesome Sound =

Live album by Old & In the Way
- Released: February 20, 1996
- Recorded: October 1973
- Genre: Folk, bluegrass
- Length: 47:39
- Label: Acoustic Disc
- Producer: David Grisman

Old & In the Way chronology
| Old & In the Way (1975) | That High Lonesome Sound (1996) | Breakdown (1997) |

Jerry Garcia chronology
| Shady Grove (1996) | That High Lonesome Sound (1996) | How Sweet It Is (1997) |

David Grisman chronology
| Shady Grove (1996) | That High Lonesome Sound (1996) | Breakdown (1997) |

Professional ratings
Review scores
| Source | Rating |
|---|---|
| Allmusic | 4.5/5 stars |
| The Music Box | 4/5 stars |

That High Lonesome Sound is the second live release of bluegrass music by Old & In the Way. Like the first one, Old & In the Way, it was recorded at the Boarding House in San Francisco in October 1973. It was released in February 1996.

== Track listing ==
1. "Hard Hearted" (Jesse McReynolds, Jim McReynolds) – 2:46
2. "The Great Pretender" (Buck Ram) – 3:38
3. "Lost" (Buzz Busby, Cindy Davis) – 3:25
4. "Catfish John" (Bob McDill, Allen Reynolds) – 4:05
5. "High Lonesome Sound" (Peter Rowan) – 3:40
6. "Lonesome Fiddle Blues" (Vassar Clements) – 3:06
7. "Love Please Come Home" (Leon Jackson) – 3:29
8. "Wicked Path of Sin" (Bill Monroe) – 2:18
9. "Uncle Pen" (Monroe) – 2:57
10. "I'm On My Way Back to the Old Home" (Monroe) – 2:54
11. "Lonesome L.A. Cowboy" (Rowan) – 4:22
12. "I Ain't Broke (But I'm Badly Bent)" (H. Payne) – 2:51
13. "Orange Blossom Special" (Ervin Rouse) – 3:31
14. "Angel Band" (Jefferson Hascall, W.B. Bradbury) – 4:37

== Credits ==
=== Old & In the Way ===
- Vassar Clements – fiddle
- Jerry Garcia – banjo, vocals
- David Grisman – mandolin, vocals
- John Kahn – acoustic bass
- Peter Rowan – guitar, vocals

=== Production ===
- Recording engineers – Owsley Stanley, Victoria Babcock
- Producer – David Grisman
- Production coordination – Craig Miller
- Mastering – Paul Stubblebine
- Liner notes – Neil V. Rosenberg , Richard Loren, Owsley Stanley
- Design, layout – D. Brent Hauseman
- Photography – Neil V. Rosenberg, Nobuharu Koboriya, Susana Millman, Sheldan Collins
