= Old & In the Way =

American bluegrass band (1973–1974)

- Origin: San Francisco, United States
- Genre: Bluegrass
- Years active: 1973–1974
- Labels: Round; Acoustic Disc; Acoustic Oasis
- Past members: Jerry Garcia; Peter Rowan; David Grisman; John Kahn; Richard Greene; Vassar Clements; John Hartford

Old & In the Way was an American bluegrass group formed in 1973. It was composed of Peter Rowan (guitar, vocals), Vassar Clements (fiddle), Jerry Garcia (banjo, vocals), David Grisman (mandolin, vocals), and John Kahn (bass). When the group was forming, it was intended that John Hartford would be the fiddle player. Based on Hartford's engagements, and Clements' reputational stature in the bluegrass community, Clements became the group's fiddler.

The group performed traditional tunes such as "Pig in a Pen" as well as bluegrass-flavored versions of the Rolling Stones' "Wild Horses" and Peter Rowan's "Panama Red". The group had a short existence playing a total of approximately 50 live shows through much of 1973 then briefly reconvening for one bluegrass festival in 1974. All the official Old & In The Way releases consist of live recordings made in San Francisco in October 1973.

Old & In the Way's self-titled debut album, which was released in 1975, went on to become one of the best selling bluegrass albums of all time. The group, without Jerry Garcia and John Kahn, released a reunion album in 2002, called Old & In the Gray.

On July 31, 2015, Peter Rowan and David Grisman (the last two surviving members of Old and In the Way) performed a set with the String Cheese Incident, Chris Pandolfi (banjo) and Blaine Sprouse (fiddle) at the 20th annual Gathering of the Vibes in Bridgeport, Connecticut. They performed many Old & In the Way songs in addition to other covers and original compositions.

== Personnel ==
=== Old & In the Way ===
- Jerry Garcia – banjo, vocals
- David Grisman – mandolin, vocals
- Peter Rowan – vocals, guitar
- Vassar Clements – fiddle
- John Kahn – bass
- Richard Greene – fiddle (original player during the group's first three months)
- John Hartford – fiddle (relieved Richard Greene during rehearsal sessions)

=== 2002 reunion: Old & In the Gray ===
- David Grisman – mandolin, vocals
- Peter Rowan – vocals, guitar
- Vassar Clements – fiddle
- Herb Pedersen – banjo, guitar, vocals
- Bryn Bright – bass

== Discography ==
Year Recorded	Year Released	Album	Chart Positions			Label
Year Recorded	Year Released	Album	US	US Bluegrass	US Country	Label
1973	1975	Old & In the Way	99			Round Records
1973	1996	That High Lonesome Sound				Acoustic Disc
1973	1997	Breakdown				Acoustic Disc
2002	2002	Old & In the Gray		9	72	Acoustic Disc
1973	2008	Live at the Boarding House		3		Acoustic Oasis
1973	2013	Live at the Boarding House: The Complete Shows				Acoustic Oasis
1973	2023	Live at Sonoma State – 11/4/73				Acoustic Oasis / Round Records
