= Breakdown (Old & In the Way album) =

1997 live album by Old & In the Way

Live album by Old & In the Way
- Released: November 18, 1997
- Recorded: October 1973
- Venue: Boarding House, San Francisco
- Genre: Folk, bluegrass, acoustic
- Length: 69:53
- Label: Acoustic Disc
- Producer: David Grisman

Old & In the Way chronology
That High Lonesome Sound (1996)	Breakdown (1997)	Old & In the Gray (2002)

Jerry Garcia chronology
How Sweet It Is (1997)	Breakdown (1997)	So What (1998)

David Grisman chronology
That High Lonesome Sound (1996)	Breakdown (1997)	Doc & Dawg (1997)

Professional ratings
Review scores
Source	Rating
AllMusic	4.5/5 stars
The Music Box	4/5 stars

Breakdown is the third live release of bluegrass music by Old & In the Way.

Like the first and second albums (Old & In the Way and That High Lonesome Sound), Breakdown was recorded at the Boarding House in San Francisco in October 1973.

== Track listing ==
1. "Introduction by Peter Rowan" – 1:35
2. "Home Is Where the Heart Is" (Connie Gateley, Joe Talley) – 1:59
3. "Down Where the River Bends" (Jack Anglin, George Peck, Johnnie Wright) – 4:35
4. "On and On" (Bill Monroe) – 3:25
5. "The Hobo Song" (Jack Bonus) – 4:58
6. "Old & In the Way Breakdown" (Jerry Garcia) – 3:47
7. "Till the End of the World Rolls 'Round" (Thomas Newton) – 2:15
8. "Panama Red" (Peter Rowan) – 2:41
9. "You'll Find Her Name Written There" (Harold Hensley) – 3:25
10. "Kissimmee Kid" (Vassar Clements) – 3:10
11. "Goin' to the Races" (Carter Stanley) – 2:35
12. "Midnight Moonlight" (Rowan) – 5:16
13. "Working on a Building" (traditional) – 2:35
14. "Muleskinner Blues" (Jimmie Rodgers, George Vaughn) – 2:57
15. "Pig in a Pen" (trad.) – 2:50
16. "Drifting Too Far from the Shore" (Charles Moody) – 4:50
17. "Jerry's Breakdown" (Garcia) – 4:29
18. "Wild Horses" (Mick Jagger, Keith Richards) – 4:39
19. "Blue Mule" (Rowan) – 4:26

Hidden track:

20. "Catfish John" (Bob McDill, Allen Reynolds) – 2:16

== Credits ==
=== Old & In the Way ===
- Vassar Clements – fiddle
- Jerry Garcia – banjo, vocals
- David Grisman – mandolin, vocals
- John Kahn – acoustic bass
- Peter Rowan – guitar, vocals

=== Production ===
- Producer – David Grisman
- Executive producer – Craig Miller
- Recording engineers – Owsley Stanley, Vickie Babcock
- Liner notes – Neil V. Rosenberg
- Principal photography – Roberto Rabanne
- Additional photography – Nobuharu Komoriya, Robert Minkin, Greg Mudd, Gary Nichols
- Design & layout – D. Brent Hauseman
- Mastering – Paul Stubblebine
