= Muleskinner (band) =

American bluegrass band

- L-R: Bill Keith, Clarence White, David Grisman, Peter Rowan, Richard Greene. Hidden behind R. Greene: Stuart Schulman.

Background information
- Origin: Los Angeles, California, United States
- Genres: Bluegrass; progressive bluegrass; country rock
- Years active: 1973
- Labels: Warner Bros., Micro Werks
- Past members: David Grisman; Clarence White; Richard Greene; Bill Keith; John Kahn; John Guerin; Peter Rowan

Muleskinner was an American bluegrass supergroup, active during the early 1970s.

== Early history ==
In the late 1960s, Peter Rowan and David Grisman played together in a psychedelic band Earth Opera. The band didn't last longer than couple of years and Rowan went on to join Seatrain, where he reconnected with Richard Greene. Rowan and Greene had been members of Bill Monroe's Bluegrass Boys in 1964–1966. After two albums with Seatrain, Greene and Rowan went on to form Muleskinner with banjoist Bill Keith, whom Greene had played with in Jim Kweskin and the Jug Band in the early 1960s, and Clarence White, former guitarist of Kentucky Colonels and The Byrds, along with bassist John Kahn and drummer John Guerin, who also worked for The Byrds.

== Planned show with Bill Monroe ==
This lineup can be considered as a bluegrass supergroup, a term not often used with bluegrass. The original start of the group was connected with Bill Monroe, as Richard Greene (who played for his Bluegrass Boys before), was asked to put a band together to join him in a television program. However, Monroe's bus had some technical problems and Muleskinner had to play the whole evening on their own and it was a success.

== Recording contract ==
All this resulted in a recording contract with Warner Bros. and the band recorded its first studio album, Muleskinner, which included elements from jazz, country and progressive bluegrass.

== Clarence White death ==
The album was successful, but the band ended under tragic circumstances: guitarist Clarence White was killed by a drunken driver just couple of months after the record was released. The band also recorded a live album in 1973, which was released 25 years later.

== Discography ==
- Muleskinner (1973) (re-released as A Potpourri of Bluegrass Jam in 1994)
- Muleskinner Live: Original Television Soundtrack (1998, recorded 1973)

== Members ==
- David Grisman - mandolin
- Peter Rowan - guitar, vocals
- Clarence White - guitar, vocals
- Richard Greene - violin, vocals
- Bill Keith - banjo
- John Kahn - bass
- Stuart Schulman - bass
- John Guerin - drums
