= Peter Rowan with The Red Hot Pickers =

Studio album by Peter Rowan
- Released: 1984
- Genre: Bluegrass
- Label: Sugar Hill
- Producer: Peter Rowan/Hiroshi Asada/Richard Greene

Peter Rowan chronology
The Walls of Time (1981)	Peter Rowan with The Red Hot Pickers (1984)	The First Whippoorwill (1985)

Peter Rowan with The Red Hot Pickers is the fifth solo album by country rock / bluegrass musician Peter Rowan. The album contains a selection of songs from the previous releases "Bluegrass Album" and "Hiroshima Mon Amour," both released in 1979 on Better Days Records by Rowan & Greene & The Red Hot Peppers. The album features Richard Greene on fiddle, Tony Trischka playing banjo, Andy Statman on mandolin, and Roger Mason on bass. All the tracks were recorded at Nippon Columbia in Tokyo, Japan.

== Track listing ==
1. "The Hobo Song" (Jack Bonus) - 4:38
2. "Old, Old House" (George Jones/Hal Bynum) - 3:17
3. "Willow Garden" (Traditional) - 2:54
4. "Jimmy Brown, the Newsboy" (Will S. Hays, arr. A.P. Carter) - 3:21
5. "Wild Bill Jones" (Traditional) - 5:31
6. "Hiroshima Mon Amour" (Peter Rowan) - 3:43
7. "Come All Ye Tenderhearted" (Traditional) - 4:47
8. "Oh! Susanna" (Stephen Foster) - 3:46
9. "Rosalie McFall" (Charlie Monroe) - 3:10
10. "A Good Woman's Love" (Hank Locklin) - 3:14
