= Vassar Clements =

American jazz, swing, and bluegrass Fiddler (1928–2005)

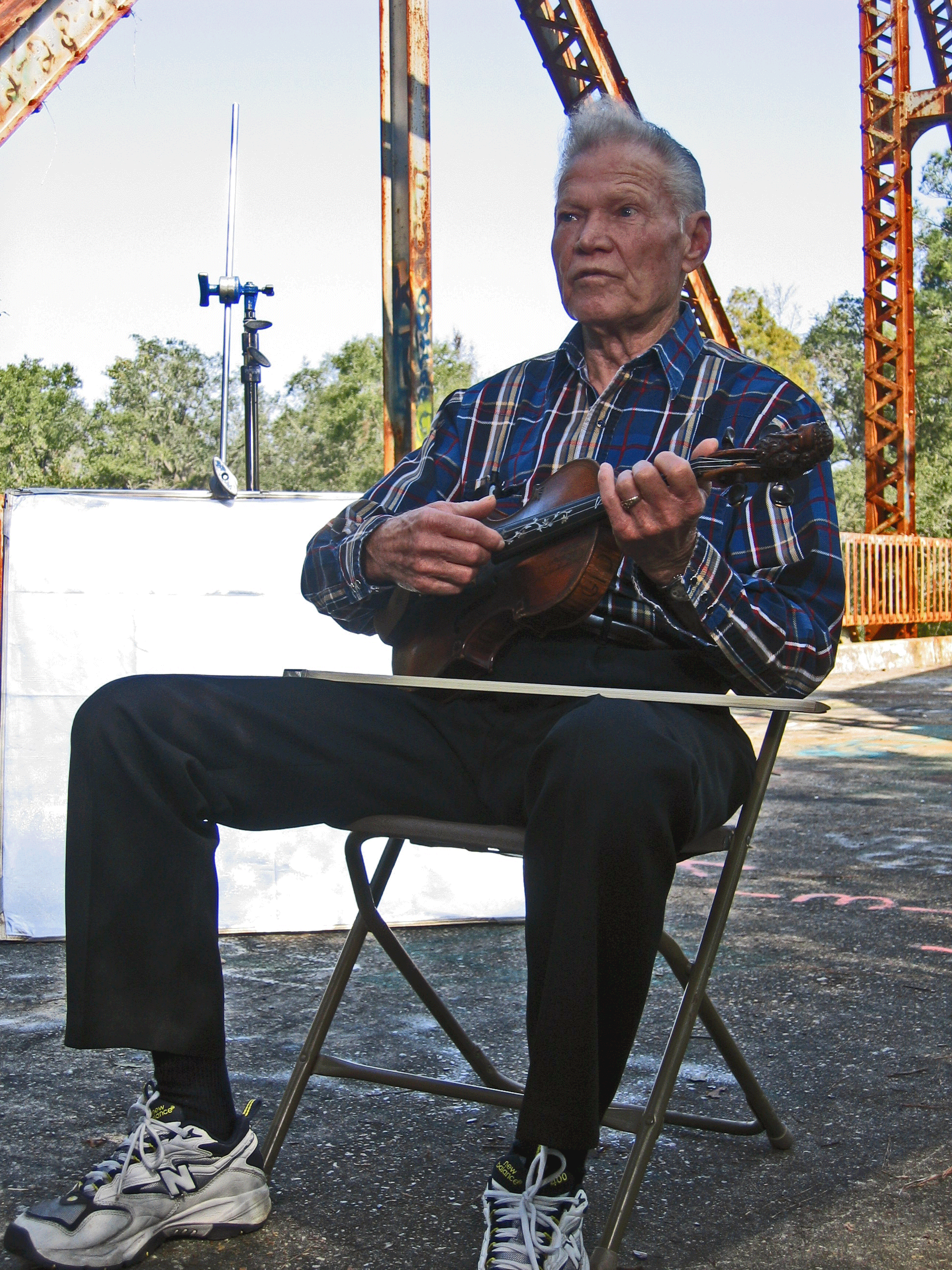
- Clements during a documentary interview in 2004, Live Oak, Florida; Court

Background information
- Born: Vassar Carlton Clements; April 25, 1928; Kinard, FL, United States
- Died: August 16, 2005 (aged 77)
- Genres: Bluegrass, country
- Occupation: Musician
- Instrument(s): Fiddle, viola, cello, double bass, mandolin, tenor banjo, guitar
- Formerly of: Bill Monroe and The Blue Grass Boys, Jim and Jesse, Earl Scruggs, John Hartford, Norman Blake, Nitty Gritty Dirt Band, Old & In the Way, Jerry Garcia, The Grateful Dead, many others

Vassar Carlton Clements (April 25, 1928 – August 16, 2005) was an American jazz, swing, and bluegrass fiddler. Clements has been dubbed the Father of Hillbilly Jazz, an improvisational style that blends and borrows from swing, hot jazz, and bluegrass along with roots also in country and other musical traditions. He was posthumously inducted into the International Bluegrass Music Hall of Fame in 2018.

== Biography ==
Clements was born in Kinard, Florida and grew up in Kissimmee. He taught himself to play the fiddle at age 7, learning "There's an Old Spinning Wheel in the Parlor" as his first song. Soon, he joined with two first cousins, Red and Gerald, to form a local string band. In his early teens Clements met Bill Monroe and the Blue Grass Boys when they came to Florida to visit Clements' stepfather, a friend of fiddler Chubby Wise. Clements was impressed with his playing.

In late 1949, Wise left Monroe's group, and the 21 year-old Clements traveled by bus to ask for an audition. When told he would have to return the next day, Clements was crestfallen, lacking the money for either a hotel room or return bus trip. Monroe gave him some money to a night's lodging, and the next day Clements auditioned and was hired. He remained with Monroe for seven years, recording with the band in 1950 and 1951.

Between 1957 and 1962, he was a member of the bluegrass band Jim and Jesse & the Virginia Boys. He also gained recognition joining with the popular bluegrass duo of Flatt and Scruggs on the popular theme to the hit television sitcom The Beverly Hillbillies. Earl Scruggs' path-breaking banjo style had premiered with Bill Monroe in the late 1940s, and thereafter gained widespread renown with Lester Flatt and the Foggy Mountain Boys.

By the mid-1960s, however, his struggles with alcohol left him making his living in blue-collar trades, being employed briefly at the Kennedy Space Center in Florida as a plumber, in a Georgia paper mill, and as switchman for Atlantic Coast Line Railroad. He even sold insurance and once operated a convenience store while owning a potato chip franchise in Huntsville, Alabama. Sobering up, he returned to Nashville in 1967, where he became a much sought-after studio musician.

After a brief touring stint with Faron Young he joined John Hartford's Dobrolic Plectral Society in 1971, when he met guitarist Norman Blake and Dobro player Tut Taylor, and recorded Aereo-Plain, a widely acclaimed "newgrass" album that helped broaden the bluegrass market and sound. After less than a year he joined up with Earl Scruggs.

His 1972 work with the Nitty Gritty Dirt Band on their album Will the Circle be Unbroken earned even wider acclaim, and he later worked on the Grateful Dead's Wake of the Flood and Jimmy Buffett's A White Sport Coat and a Pink Crustacean. Within the next two years, Clements would cut his first solo album.

In 1973, he joined and toured with the bluegrass supergroup Old & In the Way with Jerry Garcia, David Grisman, Peter Rowan, and John Kahn; their self-titled live album Old & In the Way was released in 1975.

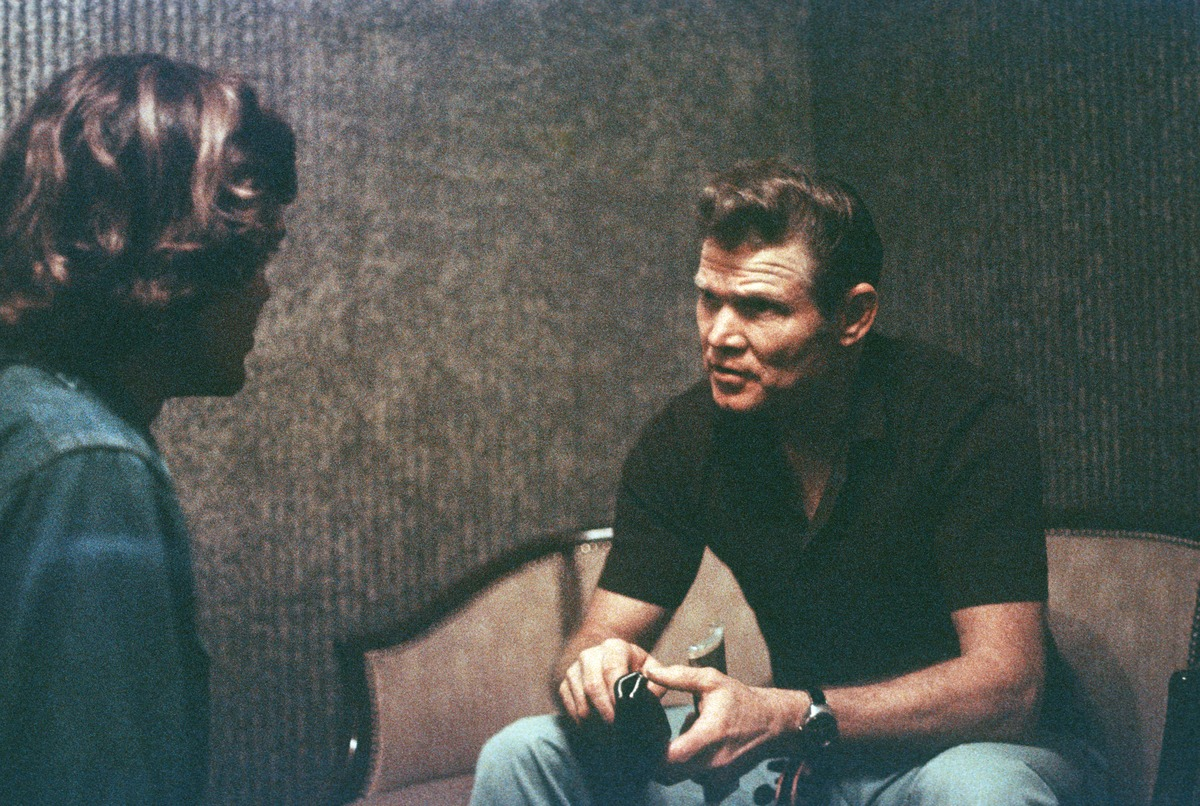
Clements in 1974

In 1974 he lent his talents to Highway Call, a solo album by former Allman Brothers Band guitarist Dickey Betts.

He was considered by many to be an outstanding fiddle virtuoso and he described his talent saying,

It was God's gift, something born in me. I was too dumb to learn it any other way. I listened to the Grand Ole Opry some. I'd pick it up one note at a time. I was young, with plenty of time and I didn't give up. You'd come home from school, do your lessons and that's it. No other distractions. I don't read music. I play what I hear.

In his 50-year career he played with artists ranging from Woody Herman and the Nitty Gritty Dirt Band to the Grateful Dead, Linda Ronstadt, and Paul McCartney, and earned at least five Grammy Award nominations and numerous professional accolades. He once recorded with the pop group the Monkees by happenstance, when he stayed behind after an earlier recording session. He also appeared as himself in Robert Altman's 1975 film Nashville and Alan Rudolph's 1976 film, Welcome to L.A.. He made a duet album with Stéphane Grappelli Together at Last in 1987.

In 2004, he performed in concert with jazz quartet Third Stream – in which a video documentary of the concert was done with Jim Easton (guitar), Tom Strohman (sax), Jim Miller (bass), and John Peifer (drums).

Though he played numerous instruments, Clements indicated that he chose the fiddle over guitar recalling that, "I picked up a guitar and fiddle and tried them both out. The guitar was pretty easy, but I couldn't get nothing out of the fiddle. So every time I'd see those instruments sitting side by side, I'd grab that fiddle."

Big band and swing music were considerable influences upon his style and musical development, and he said that, "Bands like Glenn Miller, Les Brown, Tommy Dorsey, Harry James and Artie Shaw were very popular when I was a kid. I always loved rhythm, so I guess in the back of my mind the swing and jazz subconsciously comes out when I play, because when I was learning I was always trying to emulate the big-band sounds I heard on my fiddle."

Vassar Clements played on over 200 albums, including nearly 40 on which he starred or was featured. His albums often featured newgrass style music and what Clements called "Hillbilly Jazz". His last album, Livin' With the Blues, released in 2004, was his only blues recording; it featured guest appearances by Elvin Bishop, Norton Buffalo, Maria Muldaur, and others.

His 2005 Grammy Award for Best Country Instrumental Performance was for "Earl's Breakdown," by the Nitty Gritty Dirt Band, and featured Clements, Earl Scruggs, Randy Scruggs, and Jerry Douglas.

Clements, whose last performance was February 4, 2005 in Jamestown, New York, died on August 16, 2005, aged 77, of lung cancer.

== Discography ==
- Southern Country Waltzes Rural Rhythm Records (1970)
- Vassar Mercury Records (1975)
- Superbow Mercury Records
- Crossing the Catskills (1973) Rounder Records
- Vassar Clements, John Hartford, Dave Holland (1988) Rounder Records
- Vassar Clements MCA Records
- The Bluegrass Session Flying Records
- Grass Routes Rounder Records
- Saturday Night Shuffle – A Celebration of Merle Travis Shanachie Records
- Hillbilly Jazz Flying Fish Records
- Hillbilly Jazz Rides Again (1986) Flying Fish Records
- New Hillbilly Jazz Shikata Records
- Together at Last (Stephane Grappelli & Vassar Clements) Flying Fish Records
- Nashville Jam Flying Fish Records
- Westport Drive Mind Dust Records
- The Man, The Legend Vassillie Productions
- Country Classics Vassillie Productions
- Vassar Clements Reunion with Dixie Gentlemen Old Homestead
- Once in a While (Jam with Miles Davis' ex-band members) Flying Fish Records
- Live in Telluride (1979) Vassillie Productions
- Music City USA Vassillie Productions
- Old & In the Way (1975) Rounder Records
- That High Lonesome Sound (1996) Acoustic Disc
- Breakdown (1997) Acoustic Disc
- Live at the Boarding House (2008) Acoustic Disc
- Live at the Boarding House: The Complete Shows (2013) Acoustic Disc
- The Bluegrass Sessions: Tales from the Acoustic Planet, Vol. 2 (with Béla Fleck) (1999) Warner Bros. Records
- An Americana Christmas (with Norman Blake) Winter Harvest
- The Bottom Line Encore Collection
- Vassar's Jazz (Golden Anniversary) Winter Harvest
- Back Porch Swing Chrome Records
- Dead Grass Cedar Glen Music Group
- 20 Fiddle Tunes & Waltz Favorites
- Full Circle OMS Records
- Will the Circle be Unbroken (1972) Capitol Records
- Will the Circle Be Unbroken: Volume Two (1989) Capitol Records
- Will the Circle Be Unbroken, Volume III (2002) Capitol Records
- Old & In the Gray (2002) Acoustic Disc
- Runaway Fiddle – Buddy Spicher and Vassar Clements OMS Records
- Livin' with the Blues Acoustic Disc
- We Are All One – Michael Falzarano (2008) Woodstock Records
- I Got Blues for Ya – Michael Falzarano (2014) Hypnotation Records
- Vassar – Vassar Clements Band (1980) Flying Fish Records
