= Old & In the Way (album) =

Live album by Old & In the Way
- Released: February 1975
- Recorded: October 8, 1973
- Genre: Bluegrass
- Length: 42:48
- Label: Round
- Producer: David Grisman

Old & In the Way chronology
Old & In the Way (1975)	That High Lonesome Sound (1996)

Jerry Garcia chronology
Garcia (1974)	Old & In the Way (1975)	Reflections (1976)

David Grisman chronology
Muleskinner (1973)	Old & In the Way (1975)	The David Grisman Rounder Record (1976)

Peter Rowan chronology
Muleskinner (1973)	Old & In the Way (1975)	The Rowans (1975)

Old & In the Way is the first album by the bluegrass band Old & In the Way. It was recorded 8 October 1973 at the Boarding House in San Francisco by Owsley Stanley and Vickie Babcock utilizing eight microphones (four per channel) mixed live onto a stereo Nagra tape recorder. The caricature album cover was illustrated by Greg Irons. It was, for many years, the top selling bluegrass album of all time. Eventually, however, the soundtrack album for O Brother, Where Art Thou? surpassed its sales.

== Critical reception ==
Professional ratings
Review scores
Source	Rating
Allmusic	4.5/5 stars

On AllMusic, Peter J. D'Angelo said, "Soaring multi-part harmonies; fiddle, guitar, banjo, bass, and mandolin lines that seamlessly intertwine with a good-time feel; and exceptionally solid musicianship round out the ten-track effort.... This is the sound of purists re-creating the music they grew up with and it's both enjoyable and inspiring to listen to."

== Track listing ==
Side one

1. "Pig in a Pen" (traditional) – 2:53
2. "Midnight Moonlight" (Peter Rowan) – 6:17
3. "Old and In the Way" (David Grisman) – 3:05
4. "Knockin' on Your Door" (traditional) – 3:36
5. "The Hobo Song" (Jack Bonus) – 5:05

Side two

1. "Panama Red" (Rowan) – 2:57
2. "Wild Horses" (Jagger–Richards) – 4:19
3. "Kissimmee Kid" (Vassar Clements) – 3:32
4. "White Dove" (Carter Stanley) – 4:45
5. "Land of the Navajo" (Rowan) – 6:19

== Personnel ==
=== Old & In the Way ===
- Vassar Clements – fiddle
- Jerry Garcia – banjo, vocals
- David Grisman – mandolin, vocals
- John Kahn – acoustic bass
- Peter Rowan – guitar, vocals

=== Production ===
- Recording engineers – Owsley Stanley, Vickie Babcock
- Producer, mixing – David Grisman
- Editing – David Grisman, Owsley Stanley
- Sleeve illustration – Greg Irons
- Sleeve layout – Raymond Simone
