= Earth Opera =

American psychedelic rock group

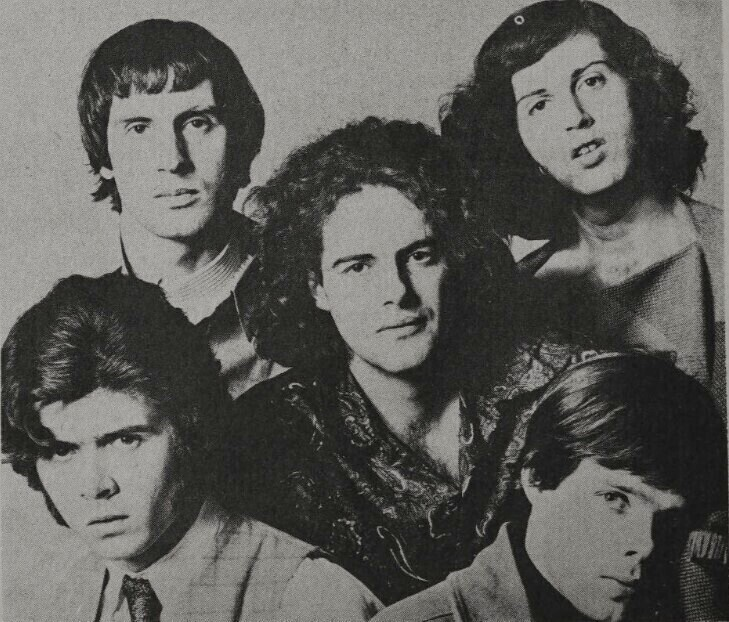

Background information
- Origin: Boston, Massachusetts, United States
- Genres: Psychedelic rock
- Years active: 1967–69
- Labels: Elektra
- Past members: Peter Rowan; David Grisman; Bill Stevenson; Paul Dillon; Billy Mundi; John Nagy; Richard Grando

Earth Opera was an American psychedelic rock group, active between 1967 and 1969 and featuring Peter Rowan and David Grisman. The band was associated with the "Bosstown Sound".

== History ==
Both Rowan and Grisman were virtuoso folk and bluegrass performers in Boston, Massachusetts, United States, clubs, who became caught up in the changes in the music scene in the mid-1960s. They formed Earth Opera in 1967 in Boston, and were joined by John Nagy on bass, Paul Dillon on drums, and Bill Stevenson on keyboards and vibraphone.

The group was signed by Jac Holzman to Elektra Records. Their self-titled debut album, produced by Grisman's ex-bandmate Peter Siegel, and including veteran drummer (and Mothers of Invention alumnus) Billy Mundi, was a mixture of folk and psychedelic influences. The group frequently opened for The Doors, who were also on Elektra Records.

Although the first album never charted, Elektra was willing to record a second LP, The Great American Eagle Tragedy. By this time, Stevenson had left. The second album featured an array of eminent guests including John Cale (viola) and Bill Keith (pedal steel).

The Great American Eagle Tragedy managed to reach the lower end of the national charts, the cover featuring a parody of the U.S. presidential seal with a superimposed death skull and what looks like blood stains. However, the band's relative lack of success caused Earth Opera to break up in 1969. Rowan, Grisman, Nagy, and Stevenson all continued their careers in the music business. Nagy became a producer and engineer, including producing the late Mimi Farina (Solo, 1986).

In 2001, both of Earth Opera's LPs were reissued on CD on Wounded Bird Records.

Dillon died unexpectedly at his home on September 25, 2018, at age 75.

== Members ==
- Peter Rowan – vocals, guitar, saxophone
- David Grisman – mandolin, mandocello, piano, saxophone, vocals
- Bill Stevenson (1967–68) – piano, harpsichord, organ, vibraphone
- Paul Dillon – drums, percussion, guitar, vocals
- Bill Mundi – percussion, drums
- John Nagy – bass, cello
- Richard Grando – saxophones

== Discography ==
=== Albums ===
- Earth Opera (1968)
- The Great American Eagle Tragedy (1969)

=== Singles ===
- "American Eagle Tragedy" (1968)
- "Close Your Eyes and Shut the Door" (1968)
- "Home to You" (1969)
