= Bill Keith (musician) =

American banjo player (1939–2015)

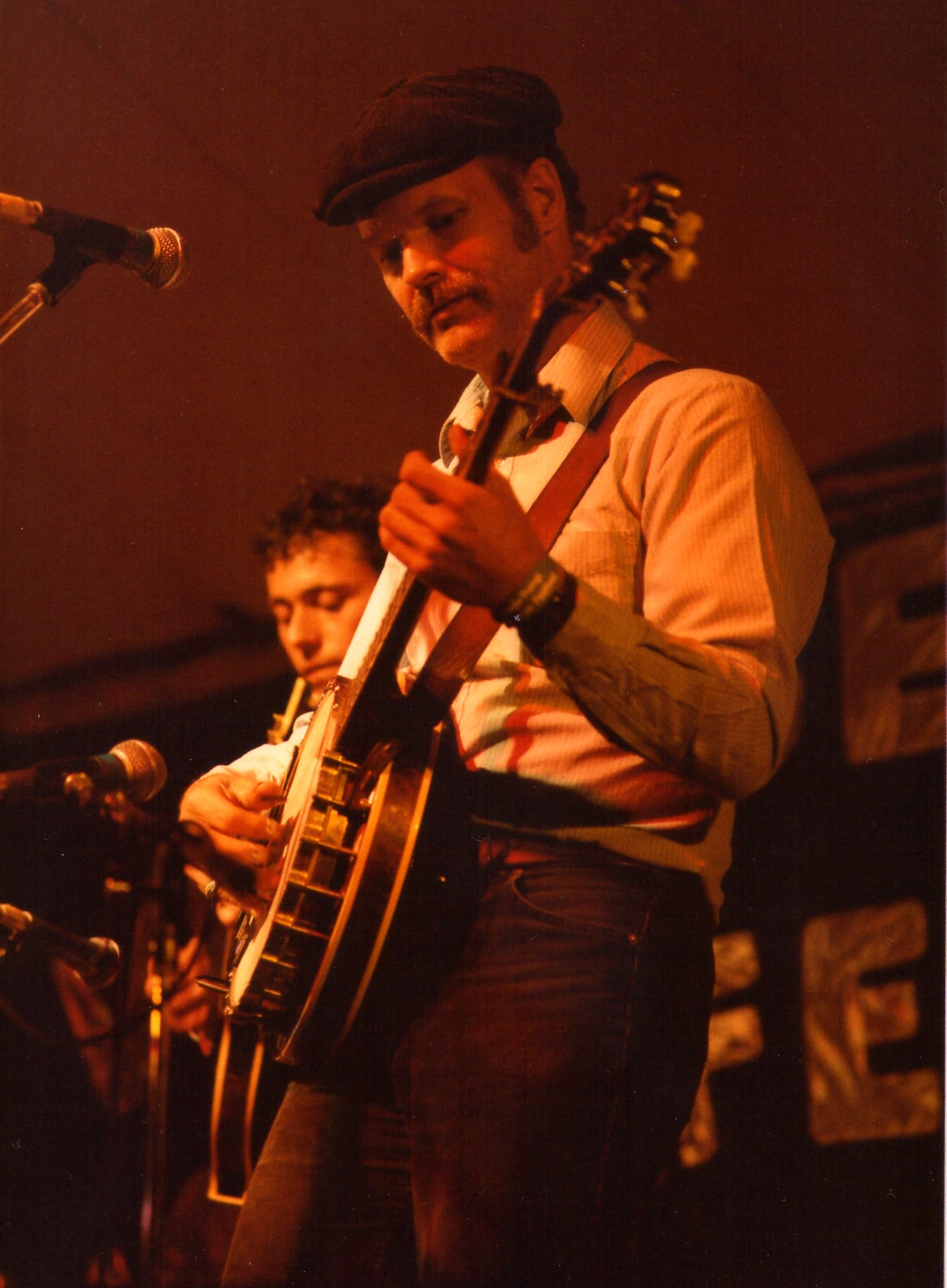
- Bill Keith on stage at the 1985 Cambridge Folk Festival

Background information
- Born: William Bradford Keith; December 20, 1939; Boston, Massachusetts, US
- Died: October 23, 2015 (aged 75) Woodstock, New York, US
- Genres: Bluegrass, Country
- Occupation: Bluegrass artist
- Instruments: Banjo, steel guitar
- Years active: 1960s – 2015

William Bradford "Bill" Keith (December 20, 1939 – October 23, 2015) was an American five-string banjoist who made a significant contribution to the stylistic development of the instrument. In the 1960s he introduced a variation on the popular "Scruggs style" of banjo playing (an integral element of bluegrass music) which would soon become known as melodic style, or "Keith style". He was inducted into the International Bluegrass Music Hall of Fame in 2015.

== Professional career ==
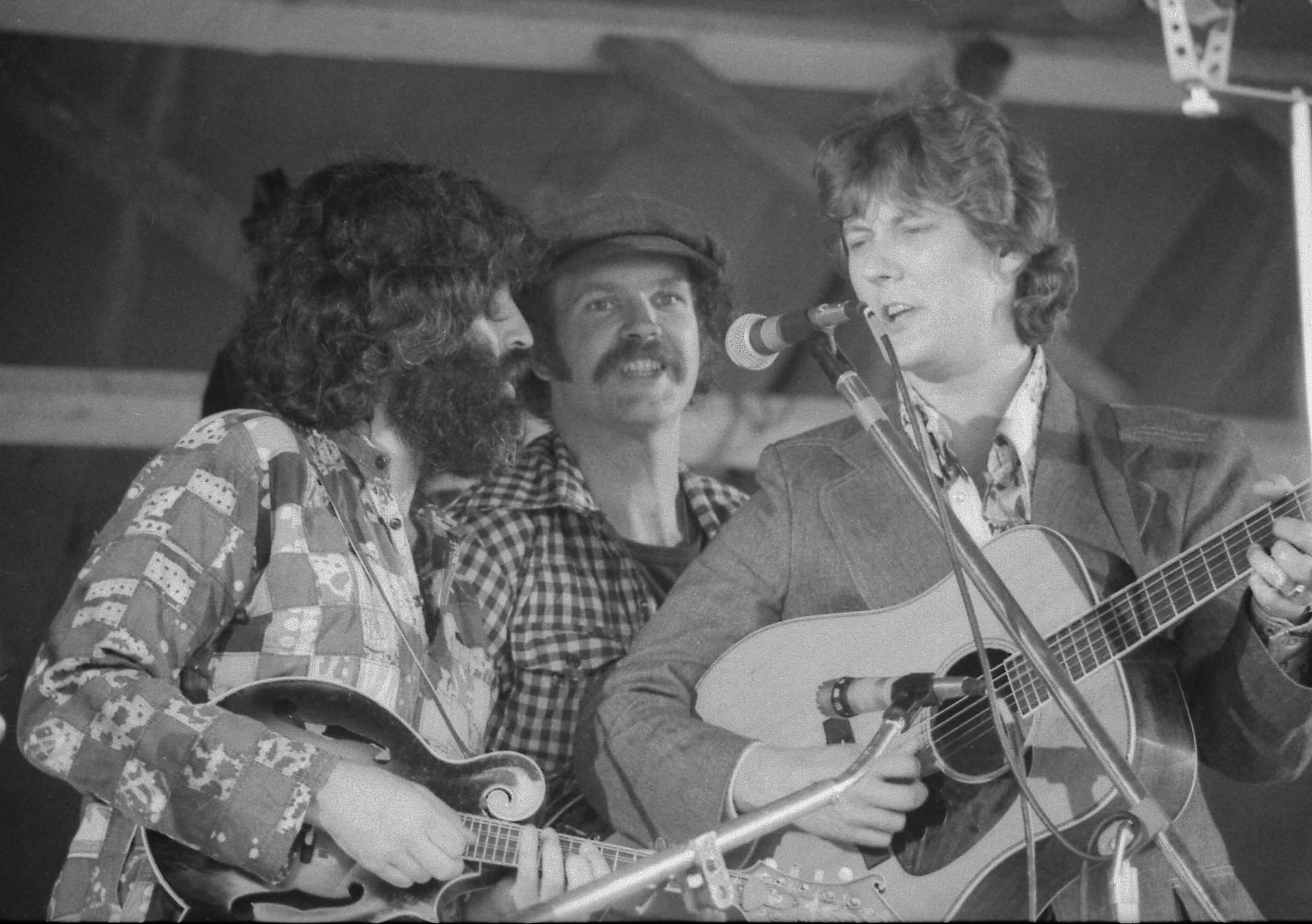
Keith (centre) with David Grisman (mandolin) and Tony Rice (guitar) at the Courville sur Eure Folk festival, France, 1977

Keith was born in Boston, Massachusetts, United States. He attended Amherst College and graduated in 1961. In 1963, he became a member of Bill Monroe's Bluegrass Boys.

Keith's recordings and performances during these nine months with Monroe permanently altered banjo playing, and his style became an important part of the playing styles of many banjoists. After leaving the Bluegrass Boys, he joined the Jim Kweskin Jug Band playing plectrum banjo. He began playing the steel guitar and soon after 1968, worked together with Ian and Sylvia and Jonathan Edwards.

In the 1970s, Keith recorded for Rounder Records. Over the years he performed with several other musicians, such as Clarence White and David Grisman in Muleskinner, Tony Trischka, Jim Rooney and Jim Collier. Today, Keith style is still regarded as modern or progressive in the context of bluegrass banjo playing. He was inducted into the International Bluegrass Music Hall of Fame at an awards ceremony in Raleigh, North Carolina, on October 1, 2015, and delivered a heartfelt address on that occasion, just three weeks prior to his death from cancer at his home in Woodstock, New York, on October 23, 2015, aged 75.

Joe Boyd, who was producing the music for the movie Deliverance, offered Duelling Banjos to Bill, but as Bill was travelling in Europe and wanted to visit a girl in Ireland, he turned it down suggesting Eric Weissberg instead.

== Afterwards ==
"Auld Lang Syne"
Bill Keith playing a banjo equipped with Keith Pegs

Keith made a mechanical contribution to the banjo, as well. He designed a specialized type of banjo tuning peg that facilitates changing quickly from one open tuning to another, while playing. Earlier famed banjoist Earl Scruggs had designed a set of cams which were added to the banjo to perform this task.

Keith's invention made the extra hardware unnecessary, replacing two of the tuning machines already on the banjo—a more elegant solution. Scruggs himself became a partner in the venture for a while, and the product was known as "Scruggs-Keith Tuners". Known today simply as Keith Tuners, they remain the state of the art, and Bill Keith continued to manufacture and market them personally as the primary product of his own company, the Beacon Banjo Company, until his death. Beacon Banjo tuners continue their proud tradition, now in the hands of his son, Martin.

== Keith style ==
The Keith style of playing the 5-string banjo emphasizes the melody of the song. Also known as the "Melodic" or "Chromatic style", it was first developed and popularized independently by Bobby Thompson and Bill Keith in the early 1960s. It is used primarily by bluegrass banjoists, though it can be applied to virtually any genre. Most banjoists who play Keith style do not use it exclusively, but integrate it as one aspect of their playing, a way of adding spice to the more common 3-finger style of Earl Scruggs.

"Sugarfoot Rag"
Bill Keith playing the banjo in melodic style

The Keith style is a fingerpicking style played with picks on the thumb, index and middle fingers. It centers on playing scales in a linear fashion. This contrasts with "3-Finger" or Scruggs style, which is centered on arpeggios, or chord tones played in rapid succession. Generally speaking, in the Keith style the fingers of the picking hand alternate between strings, rarely picking the same string twice. Frequently open strings are alternated with strings that are fretted halfway up the neck or more. These aspects contrast with "Single String" or Reno style, which also emphasizes linear (playing the same string multiple times) playing. In Reno style, however, scales are played out of closed-chord positions, where the entire scale may be played without moving the fretting hand up or down the neck, by moving from the lowest to highest string in a linear fashion. In the Reno style, the index finger and thumb generally alternate while picking, and often pick the same string two or more times in succession. One aspect of Keith style which makes it difficult to learn is that one often moves to a higher note in the scale by picking a lower string, albeit fretted to give the higher note.

A distinct advantage of melodic style is the ease of playing fiddle tunes using the melody verbatim while maintaining a right hand technique in line with Scruggs-style. Accomplishing the same goal in single string style often requires a different right hand approach. While at times the thumb may be used in a manner inconsistent with a banjo roll-based style, the "cascading" effect of the roll is still present in many examples of melodic style playing (especially with the bombastic descending runs, popular in the 1970s).

The earliest recordings of the melodic style were made by Bobby Thompson in the late 1950s when he was in Jim and Jesse's band. The style came to prominence when Bill Keith joined Bill Monroe's Bluegrass Boys in 1963. He impressed audiences with his ability to play fiddle tunes note-for-note on the banjo. Other early proponents were Marshall Brickman and Eric Weissberg. During the 1960s and 1970s, the style steadily gained popularity among progressive bluegrass banjoists like Alan Munde, Tony Trischka, Courtney Johnson, Ben Eldridge, and Gordon Stone. However, the style remains somewhat controversial among strict traditionalists.

Tony Trischka has written several instructional books that discuss the Keith Style: Hot Licks For Bluegrass Banjo, Teach Yourself Bluegrass Banjo, and especially Melodic Banjo. The latter has interviews with many prominent Keith style banjoists, including Bill Keith and Bobby Thompson. Ken Perlman has helped to popularize the style in clawhammer banjo playing.

== Discography ==
=== Solo and contributions ===
- 1962 Bill Keith & Jim Rooney, Bluegrass Livin' on the Mountain, Prestige Folklore FL 14002
- 1976 Bill Keith, Something Auld, Something Newgrass, Something Borrowed, Something Bluegrass (1976) Rounder - CD 0084, 1998 (feat. Tony Rice, David Grisman)
- 1978 Bill Keith and Jim Collier, Hexagone 883020
- 1981 Tony Trischka, Bill Keith, Bela Fleck, Fiddle Tunes for Banjo, Rounder 0124 CD 1999
- 1984 Bill Keith, Banjoistics Rounder Select OG US - 148
- 1993 Bill Keith, Beating Around The Bush, Green Linnet.

=== With Bill Monroe ===
- 1963 Bill Monroe & his Bluegrass Boys, Deca Session, 20 & 27 Mars 1963 reed. CD 3/4, tracks 1 to 7 in : Bluegrass 1963 Bill Monroe & his Bluegrass Boys, July 1963: Two Days at Newport, And More Bears AMD / ACDAA 25001(CD 2003) (feat. Del McCoury, guitar; Bill Keith, banjo; Billy Baker, fiddle; Ralph Rinzler, Bass, producer)
- 1963 Bill Monroe & his Bluegrass Boys, Live at Mechanic Hall Acoustic Disc, ACD-59 (CD 2004), (recorded 11 November 1963 by David Grisman; feat. Del McCoury, guitar; Bill Keith, banjo; Joe Stuart, fiddle; Bessie Lee Mauldin, Bass)
- 1991 Bill Monroe, Blue Grass – 1959–1969, Bear Family Records, BCD 15529 (4CD) (feat. Del McCoury, guitar; Bill Keith, banjo; Kenny Baker, fiddle; Bessie Lee Mauldin, bass; Harry Silverstein, producer)

=== Bands ===
- 1964 Red Allen, Frank Wakefield and Kentuckians, The Bluegrass, Folkways Records – FA 2408 CD 2004 Smithsonian Folkways Recordings SFW40127
- 1965 Jim Kweskin & The Jug Band, Jug Band Music, Vanguard VRS-9163, VSD-79163
- 1966 Jim Kweskin & The Jug Band, See Reverse Side For Title, Vanguard VRS-9234, VSD-79234
- 1967 Jim Kweskin & The Jug Band, Garden of Joy, Reprise 6266
- 1969 Blue Velvet Band, Sweet Moments With The Blue Velvet Band Warner Bros. - Seven Arts Records WS 1802 (Bill Keith: Pedal Steel Guitar, member of The Blue Velvet Band, with Richard Greene, Jim Rooney, Eric Weissberg).
- 1972 Mud Acres, Music Among Friends 1972, Rounder 3001
- 1973 Muleskinner, A Pot pourri of Bluegrass Jam, Warner Bros. records BS 2787 (feat. Peter Rowan, Clarence White, David Grisman)
- 1973 Muleskinner Live: Original Television Soundtrack, released in 1998, Sierra MSI-11059
- 1975 Jim Rooney, One day at the Time, Rounder Records, 3008
- 1975–1976 Bill Keith & Jim Rooney, in Banjo Paris Session vol. 1 Pony/Musigrass; Cezame CEZ 1005 and vol 2 Cezame CEZ 1022
- 1976 The David Grisman Rounder Record (1976) reed. CD 0069, 1986 (feat. Tony Rice)
- 1985 Peter Rowan The First Whippoorwill, Sugar Hill, reed. CD 1990 SHCD 3749
- 1989 David’s Rounder Album Band, Live at Grass Valley (Bluegrass festival, Ca July 30 1989: David Grisman, Tony Rice, Bill Keith, Vassar Clements, Jerry Douglas, Mark Schatz) Acousticdisc/Acoustic Oasis Downloads
- 1995 Richard Greene, The Grass is Greener, Rebel Records 1995 REB CD 1714

=== As sidemen or participant of an ephemeral group or compilation ===
- 1963 Bill Keith & Jim Rooney, Philadelphia Folk Festival - 1962 (Volume II) (various artists), Prestige Folklore INT 13072
- 1966 Gloria Belle, Today I Can Smile/Baby, You Gotta Be Mine single 45 RPM Redwing 16171 (sidemen: Bill Keith (banjo) and Clarence "Tater" Tate (fiddle))
- 1969 The Bee Gees, Odessa, Polydor Records (UK), Atco Records (US)
- 1973 Judy Collins True Stories And Other Dreams Elektra EKS-75053 (sidemen: Bill Keith: Pedal Steel Guitar, with Eric Weissberg)
- 1976 Marcel Dadi And Friends – Country Show Guitar World Records – GW 4 (US release)
- 1976 Marcel Dadi – Dadi's Pickin' - Lights Up Nashville - Part Two, Cezame – CEZ 1019 (US release, 1977: Nashville Memories, Guitar World Records – GW 6)
- 1977 Marcel Dadi – Travelin' Man Guitar World Records – GW 5 (US release)
- 1977 Bill Clifton, Clifton And Company, County Records 765 (feat. Bill Keith, Mike Auldridge, Jim Brock, Red Rector, Charlie Collins, Tom Gray)
- 1977 Christian Seguret (fr) With Bluegrass Friends: Bill Keith, Mike Lilly, Wendy Miller, Jean Marie Redon (fr), Jean-Claude Druot, Denis Blanchard – Old Fashioned Love, Cezame – CEZ 1035 (tracks: B3, B4)
- 1977 Mud Acres: Woodstock Mountains: More Music From Mud Acres, Rounder 3018 (My Love Is But A Lassie Yet, (banjo instrumental quadrille)
- 1977 Slim Richey's Jazz Grass Ridge Runner RRR0009 (Night In Tunisia - feat. Bill Keith, Alan Munde, Sam Bush...)
- 1979 (fr) Banjoistiquement Votre, Cezame CEZ 1049 (track: Steel Banjo Rag)
- 1981 Mud Acres: Woodstock Mountains Revue : Back to Mud Acres, Rounder 3065 (track: Panhandle Rag BK: banjo+ pedal steel)
- 1999 Compilation: Song Of The Hills: Appalachian Classics, Shanachie 6041 (track 5 : Footprints In The Snow, instrumental version with Tony Trischka, Eric Weissberg, Kenny Kosek, Stacy Phillips, Molly Mason).
- 2005 Gordon Titcomb The Last Train, Rising Son Records, (with Arlo Guthrie, Mike Auldridge and Bill Keith)
- 2008 Tony Trischka Territory, Smithsonian Folkways SFW CD 40169 (track: Trompe De L'oreille)

== Bibliography ==
- Tony Trischka, Pete Wernick, Masters of the 5-String Banjo, Oak Publications, 1988, ISBN 9780825602986
- Neil V. Rosenberg, Charles K. Wolfep The Music of Bill Monroe, University of Illinois Press, 2007, p. 148-151, discography p. 168 sq. Bill Keith is identified as: "Bradford Keith". ISBN 978-0252031212
- "Bill Keith" in The Encyclopedia of Country Music, The Ultimate Guide to the Music, ed. by The Country Music Foundation and Paul Kinsbury, Oxford University Press, 1998, p. 276. ISBN 978-0195176087
