= Jim Kweskin =

American folk, jazz, and blues musician

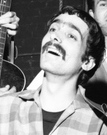
- Kweskin c. early 1960s

Background information
- Born: July 18, 1940 (age 86); Stamford, Connecticut, U.S.
- Genres: Folk; jazz; blues
- Occupation: Singer
- Instruments: Vocals, guitar
- Website: jimkweskin.com

Jim Kweskin (born July 18, 1940, Stamford, Connecticut) is an American folk, jazz, and blues musician, and the founder of the Jim Kweskin Jug Band, also known as Jim Kweskin and the Jug Band, with Fritz Richmond, Geoff Muldaur, Maria Muldaur, Bob Siggins and Bruno Wolfe.

The Jim Kweskin Jug Band played a significant role in the folk and blues revival of the 1960s. They had an influence on such bands as The Grateful Dead, Nitty Gritty Dirt Band and The Lovin' Spoonful.

== History ==
We not only have no one 'tradition' to try to be faithful to, but for much of what we play, we don't know if we even have tradition to be concerned with. We can do almost anything we want.

— Jim Kweskin on his group's departure from the 1930s jug band tradition

Maria Muldaur (née Maria D'Amato), formerly with the Even Dozen Jug Band, and soon the wife of Geoff Muldaur, joined the band in 1963. They played The Newport Folk Festival five years in a row 1964-1968 and during their 5 years together as a band, they successfully modernized the sounds of pre–World War II rural music.

The Jug Band released six albums and two greatest hits compilations on Vanguard Records between 1963 and 1970. As a solo act and with other combinations of musicians, Kweskin released Jim Kweskin's America on Reprise Records in 1971 and four albums on Mountain Railroad Records between 1978 and 1987. He has continued to release albums into the 2010s.

Kweskin is most often recognized as a singer and bandleader, but he is also known for his guitar stylings, adapting the ragtime-blues fingerpicking of artists like Blind Boy Fuller and Mississippi John Hurt, while incorporating more sophisticated jazz and blues stylings into the mix. In 2013, the band held a reunion tour that included Jim Kweskin, Maria Muldaur, Geoff Muldaur, Richard Greene, Bill Keith, Cindy Cashdollar and Sam Bevan, most of whom were amongst its original members.

In the late 1960s, Kweskin joined the Fort Hill Community, which was founded by former Kweskin Jug Band harmonicist Mel Lyman in Boston. In the 1970s, Kweskin recorded some vocals for some Sesame Street inserts, most notably, "Ladybugs' Picnic". In the 1980s, he stopped recording and performing regularly to devote himself to building houses. The Fort Hill Community evolved into the Los Angeles–based Fort Hill Construction, of which Kweskin was a founding partner and where he works as vice president.

In the 21st century, he resumed making music, including tours and recordings with Geoff Muldaur, Meredith Axelrod, and Samoa Wilson. In 2024, he released Never Too Late: Duets with My Friends featuring duets with friends including one with Maria Muldaur. In 2025, he released Doing Things Right, as part of an ensemble called The Berlin Hall Saturday Night Revue.

== Jim Kweskin Jug Band members ==
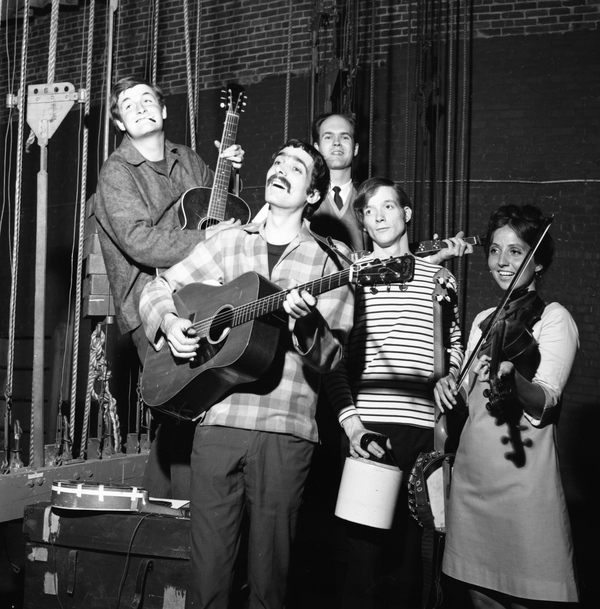
The Jim Kweskin Jug Band in the early 1960s

- Jim Kweskin – guitar, vocals, comb
- Mel Lyman – harmonica, banjo
- Bill Keith – banjo, pedal steel guitar
- Fritz Richmond – jug, washtub bass
- Richard Greene – fiddle
- Maria Muldaur – vocals, percussion, fiddle
- Geoff Muldaur – guitar, vocals, mandolin, washboard, kazoo
- Bruno Wolfe – vocals
- Bob Siggins – vocals, banjo

== Discography ==
=== Jim Kweskin and the Jug Band: Albums ===
- Unblushing Brassiness (1963)
- Jug Band Music (1965)
- Relax Your Mind (1966)
- Jim Kweskin and the Jug Band (1966)
- See Reverse Side for Title (1966)
- Garden of Joy (1967), later reissued as a double album with America, below
- The Best of Jim Kweskin and the Jug Band (1968)
- Whatever Happened to Those Good Old Days (1968)
- Greatest Hits (1988)
- Acoustic Swing & Jug (2006)
- Vanguard Visionaries (2007)

=== Jim Kweskin and the Jug Band: Singles ===
- "Minglewood" / "Sheik of Araby" (1967)
- "I'll Be Your Baby Tonight" / "Circus Song"

=== Jim Kweskin: Albums (incomplete list) ===
- Relax Your Mind (1966)
- Jump for Joy (1967)
- Jim Kweskin's America (1971), later reissued as a double album with Garden of Joy, above
- Lives Again (1977)
- Side by Side (1979)
- Swing on a Star with Jim Kweskin and the Kids (1979)
- Now & Again (2003), with Samoa Wilson
- Live The Life (2004), with Samoa Wilson
- Enjoy Yourself (2009)
- Jug Band Extravaganza (2010), by Jim Kweskin, Geoff Muldaur, John Sebastian, David Grisman, Maria Muldaur, the Barbeque Orchestra
- Jim Kweskin in the 21st Century (2015)
- Come On In (2016), by Jim Kweskin and Meredith Axelrod
- Penny's Farm (2016) by Jim Kweskin and Geoff Muldaur
- Jim Kweskin Unjugged (2017)
- I Just Want To Be Horizontal (2020) by Samoa Wilson and Jim Kweskin.
- Never Too Late: Duets with My Friends (2024)
