= Andy Kulberg =

American musician (1944–2002)

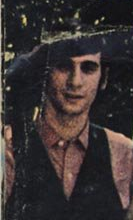
- Kulberg in 1966

Background information
- Born: April 30, 1944; Buffalo, New York, U.S.
- Origin: Greenwich Village, New York, U.S.
- Died: January 28, 2002 (aged 57) Fairfax, California, U.S.
- Genres: Blues rock; psychedelic rock; garage rock; jazz rock; roots rock
- Occupations: Musician; composer
- Instruments: Bass; flute; vocals
- Years active: 1965-2002
- Labels: Verve; Capitol; A&M; Warner Bros.
- Formerly of: The Blues Project; Seatrain; Chris Michie

Andrew Kulberg (April 30, 1944 – January 28, 2002) was an American musician and composer, best known for his bass guitar and flute playing with the Blues Project and Seatrain.

== Biography ==
Kulberg was born in Buffalo, New York, and grew up in nearby Amherst. In 1965, he founded the Blues Project, along with Al Kooper, Danny Kalb, Steve Katz, and Roy Blumenfeld. Kulberg was the band's bass guitarist and flautist, and claimed to have invented the electric flute by drilling a hole and inserting an electric pickup. After leaving the band in 1967, he formed a new group in 1968 called Seatrain, whose second self-titled album was the first production by George Martin after the breakup of the Beatles. Following the band's dissolution in 1973, he began collaborating with Chris Michie in 1976, with the duo providing music through their company Kulberg/Michie Music in San Rafael, California. He also scored music for TV shows and films such as Starsky & Hutch, B.A.D. Cats, and Cardiac Arrest.

Kulberg died on January 28, 2002 from a long battle with lymphoma, and was cremated with his ashes given to family. On October 18, 2007, he was inducted into the Buffalo Music Hall of Fame.
