= Seatrain (album) =

Studio album by Seatrain
- Released: 1970
- Recorded: 1970
- Genre: Folk rock; progressive folk; roots rock; progressive rock
- Length: 43:49
- Label: Capitol (original release); One Way (1990 CD reissue)
- Producer: George Martin

Seatrain chronology
Sea Train (1969)	Seatrain (1970)	The Marblehead Messenger (1971)

Seatrain is the second album by the band Seatrain, recorded in 1970 and adding Peter Rowan on guitar and lead vocals. The most successful song on this album is "13 Questions", which reached #49 in the Billboard charts. The album is notable for being the first record produced by George Martin after his work with The Beatles as well as marking an early appearance of the Little Feat classic "Willin'" before its appearance on that band's first album, Little Feat.

== Reception ==
Professional ratings
Review scores
Source	Rating
Allmusic	4.5/5 stars

Allmusic's brief retrospective review called Seatrain "a great album of East Coast rock and country-soul".

== Track listing ==
1. "Willin'" (Lowell George) 3:32 (listed as "I'm Willin'")
2. "Song of Job" (Kulberg, Roberts) 6:04
3. "Broken Morning" (Kulberg, Roberts) 3:04
4. "Home to You" (Rowan) 3:22
5. "Out Where the Hills" (Kulberg, Roberts) 5:48
6. "Waiting for Elijah" (Rowan) 3:35
7. "13 Questions" (Kulberg, Roberts) 2:58
8. "Oh My Love" (Rowan) 2:50
9. "Sally Goodin'" (Traditional arr. Greene) 2:09
10. "Creepin' Midnight" (Gerry Goffin, Carole King) 5:20
11. "Orange Blossom Special" (Ervin T. Rouse arr. Greene) 5:07

== Charts ==
Chart (1971)	Peak position
Australia (Kent Music Report)	36

== Personnel ==
- Peter Rowan – guitar, lead vocals
- Richard Greene – violin, backing vocals, viola, keyboards
- Lloyd Baskin – keyboards, lead vocals
- Andy Kulberg – bass guitar, backing vocals, flute
- Larry Atamanuik – drums, percussion
- Jim Roberts – lyricist
