= Richard Greene (musician) =

American violinist (born 1942)

- Born: November 9, 1942 (age 83); Los Angeles, California, U.S.
- Genres: Classical, rock, bluegrass
- Occupation: Musician
- Instrument: Violin
- Years active: 1964–present
- Website: www.richardgreene.net

Richard Greene (born November 9, 1942) is an American violinist who has been described as "one of the most innovative and influential fiddle players of all time". Greene is credited with introducing the chop to fiddle playing while working with Bill Monroe and the Blue Grass Boys, the invention of which he attributes to pain in his wrist and arm and "laziness". He featured the technique in his performances with Seatrain.

== Biography ==
Greene was born in Beverly Hills and grew up in Los Angeles. He began studying classical music at age 5 but turned to folk music by high school. After entering the University of California, Berkeley, he joined the Coast Mountain Ramblers and later the Dry City Scat Band, led by guitarist David Lindley. Greene first attained prominence with Bill Monroe and the Bluegrass Boys in 1966 as one of Monroe's first "northern" band members. He then joined the Jim Kweskin Jug Band, recording with them on the 1967 album Garden of Joy.

After playing briefly with the Blues Project, Greene joined Blues Project founder Andy Kulberg and Jim Roberts in forming the roots-fusion band Sea Train, which released its self-titled debut in 1969. The band's second self-titled album, released the next year under the newly-shortened name Seatrain, was produced by Beatles producer George Martin and included the hit song "13 Questions". By then, Earth Opera guitarist Peter Rowan had joined the band, which played a mix of rock, bluegrass, folk, and blues.

Other bands Greene has been with, usually as a leader or co-leader, include:

- Blue Velvet Band with Bill Keith, Eric Weissberg, and Jim Rooney (1969)
- Muleskinner with Rowan, Keith, and Clarence White (1973)
- The Great American Music Band initially with David Grisman and Vassar Clements and later performances that included John Carlini, Todd Phillips, Darol Anger, and Jerry Garcia (c. 1974-75)
- The Greene String Quartet (c. 1988-91)
- The Grass Is Greener which released recordings that included David Grier, Keith, Kenny Blackwell, Tim Emmons, Chris Thile, Butch Baldassari, Buell Neidlinger, and Tony Trischka (1992–94)
- Richard Greene & the Brothers Barton (2006)
- Hands Across the Pond - Duets with Beryl Marriiot recorded in her home in England

Greene also has recorded or performed with Red Allen, Bill Monroe, Gary Burton, Melissa Manchester, Greenbriar Boys, James Taylor, Tony Rice, Linda Ronstadt, Dolly Parton, Emmylou Harris, Kenny Rankin, Bob Seger, Old & In the Way, Brian Wilson, Eddie Adcock, George Strait, Loggins and Messina, Crosby, Stills & Nash, Peter Rowan, Deana Carter, Rod Stewart, Lacy J. Dalton, Jerry Garcia, Van Dyke Parks, Bruce Springsteen, Sting, Joss Stone, Richard Thompson, Kelly Clarkson, Mandy Moore, Tony Bennett, and the Wagner Ensemble (Jeannine Wagner).

He has headlined major festivals, including Telluride, Sedona, and Live Oak. He teaches courses at the Mancini Institute, the RockyGrass Academy, the Festival of Fiddle Tunes, Mark O'Connor Fiddle Camp, the Rocky Mountain Fiddle Camp, the Swannanoa Gathering, and dozens of ad hoc workshops throughout the year.

== Awards and honors ==
- Grammy Award for Best Instrumental Performance of the Year (1997)
- Grammy Nomination for Best Bluegrass Recording of the Year (1998)
- International Bluegrass Music Association Award: Recorded Event of the Year
- International Bluegrass Music Association Nomination: Instrumental Band of the Year
- Honorary Kentucky Colonel
