= Christopher Shaw (musician) =

Folk musician

Christopher Alden Shaw is a folk musician specializing in the music and folklore of the Adirondack Mountains, recognized nationally as a notable practitioner of this milieu. His first album, Adirondack, a collection of traditional and original tunes, was selected for inclusion in the folk music collection of the Library of Congress. "Shaw's new songs sound like ancient ones," said Geoffrey Himes of The Washington Post. The "Ambassador of the Adirondacks" frequently collaborates with his wife, fellow singer-songwriter Bridget Ball. Capital Region Magazine called him "a walking, talking, singing National Geographic Special."

== Early life ==
Born in 1954, Shaw grew up in Adirondack community of Lake George, where his father owned and operated sightseeing tours on the mahogany steamboat Sayonara. Shaw left Lake George in 1972 to attend Fairleigh Dickinson University, graduating with a degree in biology.

In college, Shaw began to play guitar and formed a folk trio that eventually performed a concert on the Sloop Clearwater. It was also in college where he met future friend and mentor, folksinger Bill Staines. In 2022, Shaw served as Master of Ceremonies at Caffè Lena's concert tribute to Staines in remembrance of his passing.

In 1977, he found work in the emergency room of Albany Medical Center. He also frequented Saratoga Springs' Caffè Lena, where proprietor Lena Spencer provided a mentorship role. "Lena had kind of taken me under her wing from the first...when I was broke she'd lose my bill," said Shaw. He later headlined at the venue.

He began collecting traditional tunes, many he had heard growing up, aided by field recordings from song collectors and folklorists Marjorie Lansing Porter and Frank and Anne Warner.

He met singer-songwriter Bridget Ball in 1981 at a punk rock concert in Albany, NY. Shaw had just decided to quit his job and focus on music full-time. Three years later, they were married. They separated and divorced in 2023.

Early years as a household of two professional musicians was difficult, as they attempted to land distribution deals for their music with little luck. They formed their own company to release music in response, and primarily marketed directly to stores and consumers. In 1987, they decided to quit playing in bars and focus on touring.

== Career ==
=== Great Acoustics ===
Inspired in part by DJ Wanda Fischer's Hudson River Sampler program, Shaw and Bridget Ball began a live radio series airing weekly on Northeast Public Radio. Great Acoustics: Live from the Hudson River Cafe debuted in 1986, broadcast live with a live in-studio audience and modeled after A Prairie Home Companion. Airing throughout the northeast, it received national distribution for some shows.

Live guests included Happy Traum, Artie Traum, Josh White Jr., Rory Block, Greg Brown and Garnet Rogers.

The show ended in December 1988.

=== Albums and performances ===
In 1985, Shaw debuted his self-released cassette Without a Net at Saratoga's Caffè Lena, consisting of a live recording from Mother's Wine Emporium coffeehouse at Rensselaer Polytechnic Institute.

Shaw release Adirondack in 1988. Produced by Rory Block, Adirondack also featured Jay Ungar and Artie Traum. The album represented a change of direction for Shaw, moving away from the more conventional singer/songwriter mode he had pursued in years prior. It was picked up for national distribution by Silo/Alcazar, and proved popular on college and acoustic radio. WHRB and WNHU both named it one of their top albums of the year. "It's a wonderful album," said WNHU DJ Cliff Furnald. "If the Adirondacks have a voice, it sounds like Chris Shaw," said The Daily Gazette. It included a rare cover of "Honest Sam" by reclusive songwriter Paul Siebel. Other songs include portraits of Adirondack hermit French Louie and acclaimed North Country violinist Nick Goodall (previously immortalized in a bestselling novel by Irving Bacheller).

In October 1989, Shaw performed at the Smithsonian Institution Museum of American History.

Shaw's 1991 album Born and Raised was produced by Rory Block with contributions from Vassar Clements, John Sebastian and Garth Hudson. It featured the biographical song "Working Ships" praised by Dirty Linen for its "weight, structure and simplicity." "The Year of 88" was lauded by The Washington Post. "Together with his earlier album, "Adirondack," Shaw is emerging as the foremost musical interpreter on the scene today of the North Country's rich folk tradition," observed the Albany Times Union. "In crazy times like these, music like Christopher Shaw's is not only welcome, but necessary. "Born and Raised" should be required listening for all Adirondack residents," remarked the Plattsburgh Press-Republican.

One track from Born and Raised, also featured on 1991's holiday album Mountain Snow and Mistletoe, became a signature song. "Ten Dollar Christmas" is based on the true story of a Depression-era family. In December 1991, it was included in the Mainly Adult Contemporary CD, distributed nationally to adult contemporary radio stations. It entered national radio rotation as a result rising to #7 on the charts for the month of December in 1991. "As sick as I am of listening to Christmas carols, I just can't bear to eject this CD from the stereo," concluded the Meriden Record-Journal.

In 1992, Shaw performed at the Cathedral of St. John the Divine, appearing alongside Dan Berggren, Carl Heilman, Anne LaBastille, Bill Smith and Bill McKibben as part of a series of statewide events commemorating the Adirondack Park centennial year.

On 1993's Fireside--Adirondack Stories, Humor and Downright Lies, Shaw exhibited his storytelling and humorous tales that featured prominently in his live performances. "Chris Shaw is in his storytelling element, with crickets chirping and fire crackling making this an unusually intimate audio experience," said critic Ellen Geisel. "Shaw's voice is smooth, comforting in the night as he weaves yarns that familiarly cloak you," remarked another critic. Many of the stories are tall tales, inspired by the stories and experiences with his uncle Walter Blair.

That same year, he performed at the National Portrait Gallery in the Smithsonian Associates' "City Sunsets" series.

Been to Town and Back Again was released in 1994, with Shaw accompanied by Jay Ungar, Tony Trischka, Cindy Cashdollar, Steve Riley, John Sebastian and John Herald. It was produced by Shaw and Tony Markellis. An appearance at the Old Songs Festival served as an album release party. It was praised for "consistently appealing story songs with a sense of tradition and place that most contemporary acoustic music sorely lacks" by Dirty Linen. "Shaw's fifth album is easily his best yet," according to critic Greg Haymes.

A sequel holiday album Mountain Snow and MistleTWO also appeared in 1994, with Bridget Ball, John Kirk, David Malachowski and Brian Melick.

Shaw performed at the Philadelphia Folk Festival in 1996, where he also taught a workshop on narrative song. He released a third collaboration with Bridget Ball that same year, a departure from previous releases that focused on original songs. Songs from the Big Front Porch, a collection of traditional folk tunes, was accompanied by guitar chords to foster a sing-along atmosphere.

Shaw's last solo album, Adirondack Serenade was released in 2000, coinciding with a performance at the John F. Kennedy Center for the Performing Arts which was also streamed live on the internet.

In 2003, Shaw formed a group called Big Trout Radio with Artie Traum and author Connelly Akstens. An album, Songs About Fishing, along with a tour, followed.

Shaw toured widely for many years. In addition to appearances at Philadelphia Folk Festival, the Kennedy Center and Smithsonian Institution, he has also performed at Old Songs Festival, Adirondack Music Celebration, the Music Festival in the Adirondacks, the Adirondack Music Festival, GottaGetGon Festival, headline concerts in Escondido, California, at me&thee Coffeehouse, Wilkes-Barre, PA, Vergennes Opera House,

=== Mountain Snow and Mistletoe ===
A cassette tape of Christmas tunes recorded at home with wife Bridget Ball led to the holiday-themed album Mountain Snow and Mistletoe in 1991. That year, the two began presenting a live show with same name, featuring original Adirondack folk music mixed with traditional songs. Initially performed in libraries and church basements, they quickly graduated to larger venues, including Caffe Lena.

In 1994, they released a sequel and began expanding their holiday production to meet demand. After touring their show in the Midwest, they began presenting it annually at Troy Savings Bank Music Hall starting in 1996. The concert became a popular regional tradition. The show has featured guest artists including Kevin McKrell, Camille West and Tony Markellis. In 2010, it moved to The Egg. After 25 years, Mountain Snow and Mistletoe gave its final performance in 2015.

== Later life ==
In addition to music, Shaw performed historical reenactments for schools, including presentations about the French and Indian War and Robert Rogers. Ancestor John Shaw fought in Rogers' unit at the Battle on Snowshoes.

For 15 years, Shaw worked as a guitar clinician for Taylor Guitars, specializing in folk fingerstyle playing alongside other musicians such as Livingston Taylor and Artie Traum.

Shaw briefly served as the executive director of the Adirondack Folk School, a not-for-profit dedicated to preserving and teaching the skills of Adirondack folk craft.

He retired from music in 2015 after obtaining a degree in culinary arts. He is now a food writer for the online publication Nippertown.

== Discography ==
- Without a Net (1985)
- Adirondack (1988)
- Born and Raised (1991)
- Mountain Snow and Mistletoe (1991) with Bridget Ball
- Fireside (1993)
- Been to Town and Back Again (1994)
- Mountain Snow and MistleTWO with Bridget Ball (1994)
- Songs from the Big Front Porch with Bridget Ball (1996)
- Adirondack Serenade (2000)
- Songs About Fishing (2003) as Big Trout Radio (with Artie Traum and Tom Akstens)

=== Appears on ===
- Duffy Rose (1986) Bridget Ball
- Mothers and Daughters (1989) Bridget Ball
- Almost Dancing (1990) Bridget Ball
- Adirondack Songwriters Live! (1991)
- Music from the Adirondacks (1992)
- North River, North Woods (2009) with Dan Berggren, John Kirk

=== Television appearances ===
- Music from the Adirondacks (1992)
- Songs from the Heart of the Adirondacks WMHT(1995)
- Chris Shaw: Live in Concert WMHT(1996)
- Christmas in the Adirondacks WMHT(1996)
- Adirondack Wild WMHT (2005)
- Seneca Ray Stoddard: an American Original (as the voice of Seneca Ray Stoddard) WMHT(2006)
