= Homespun Music Instruction =

- Founded: 1967
- Founder: Happy Traum; Jane Traum
- Distributor(s): Hal Leonard
- Genre: Acoustic music, folk, country, bluegrass music, jazz, rock, blues, old-time music, classical music, Irish music, Cajun music
- Country of origin: USA
- Location: Woodstock, New York
- Official website: www.homespun.com

Homespun offers music instruction for many instruments and styles on CD, DVD and streaming media.

== History ==
Happy Traum's inspiration for Homespun came in 1967, when he was a musician and part-time guitar teacher in New York City. When he moved to Woodstock, New York and began to tour with his brother Artie Traum, he made tapes (based on his 1965 book Fingerpicking Styles for Guitar) for his guitar students to use when he was unavailable.

He also received letters from others who wanted to learn to play, so he made more tapes and sold them via classified advertisements in Guitar Player, Rolling Stone, and Sing Out! magazines.

He decided to turn this effort into the Homespun business, with his wife Jane as co-owner and his brother Artie assisting. They invited musicians they knew to record instructional tapes. Bill Keith (banjo) and Kenny Kosek (fiddle) were among the first to participate.

Homespun's first instructional lessons were recorded in Traum's home and sold on five-inch reel-to-reel tapes, as cassettes were not yet generally available. The tapes were manually reproduced one by one at home: thus the name "Homespun."

Traum produced the sessions, and provided guidance for artists who were uncomfortable teaching. As the business grew, Traum traveled to other locations to record more musicians, and invited musicians outside their circle of friends to participate.

In 1983, Homespun introduced music instruction on VCR tapes, before most homes had video players. Through the years, Homespun has expanded its audio and video formats, moving from audio cassette and video tape to CDs, DVDs, and streaming media.

The Hal Leonard Corporation has been distributing Homespun products since 1995. Homespun products are also sold at their website, and the Roots music channel offers a web subscription service for Homespun streaming media.

== Instructors ==
The following is a partial list of artists who have provided music instruction on a Homespun release.

=== A – C ===
- John Abercrombie
- Eddie Adcock
- Gaye Adegbalola
- Steve Allen
- Darol Anger
- Chet Atkins
- Etta Baker
- Butch Baldassari
- Russ Barenberg
- Ray Benson
- Norman and Nancy Blake
- Rory Block
- Bruce Bouton
- Bob Brozman
- Dix Bruce
- Bryan Bowers
- Kevin Burke
- Sam Bush
- Larry Campbell
- Bob Carlin
- Jack Casady
- Cindy Cashdollar
- Catfish Keith
- Vassar Clements
- David Bennett Cohen
- Dan Crary

=== D – G ===
- Rick Danko
- Jack DeJohnette
- Michael Doucet
- Jerry Douglas
- John Doyle
- Casey Driessen
- Steve Earle
- Ramblin' Jack Elliott
- Bill Evans
- Donald Fagen
- Cathy Fink
- Eliot Fisk
- Béla Fleck
- Beppe Gambetta
- Amos Garrett
- Jimmie Dale Gilmore
- Danny Gottlieb
- Richard Greene
- David Grier
- David Grisman
- George Gruhn

=== H – L ===
- John Hammond
- Frederic Hand
- Corey Harris
- John Hartford
- Ernie Hawkins
- Levon Helm
- Billy Hinsche
- David Holt
- Aaron Hurwitz ("Professor Louie")
- Rob Ickes
- John Jackson
- John James
- Flaco Jiménez
- Johnnie Johnson
- Buster B. Jones
- Keb' Mo'
- Jorma Kaukonen
- Bill Keith
- Pete Kennedy
- Jim Kweskin
- Andy LaVerne
- Brad Leftwich
- Howard Levy
- Caterina Lichtenberg

=== M – R ===
- Mike Marshall
- Steve Martin
- Cathal McConnell
- Ronnie McCoury
- John McCutcheon
- Roger McGuinn
- Jesse McReynolds
- Joey Miskulin
- Bill Monroe
- Geoff Muldaur
- Maria Muldaur
- Tim O'Brien
- Mark O'Connor
- Sonny Osborne
- Gary Peacock
- Al Petteway
- Kelly Joe Phelps
- Dirk Powell
- Mac Rebennack (Dr John)
- Don Wayne Reno
- Del Rey
- Tony Rice
- Jean Ritchie
- Lee Rocker
- Peter Rowan
- Tom Rush

=== S – Z ===
- Floyd Scholz
- David Schnaufer
- John Sebastian
- Mike Seeger
- Pete Seeger
- Martin Simpson
- Chris Smither
- Ralph Stanley
- Andy Statman
- Hubert Sumlin
- Bryan Sutton
- Livingston Taylor
- Hans Theessink
- Chris Thile
- Richard Thompson
- David Torn
- Adam Traum
- Artie Traum
- Happy Traum
- Tony Trischka
- Jay Ungar
- Darrin Vincent
- Rob Wasserman
- Doc Watson
- Merle Watson
- Jim Weider
- David Wilcox
- Jim Wood
- Victor Wooten
