= Nunnelee =

Nunnelee is a surname. Notable people with the surname include:

- Alan Nunnelee (1958–2015), American politician from Mississippi
- James H. Nunnelee (1858–1921), American politician from Alabama

== See also ==
- Nunneley
- Nunnely
- Nunnally
