= Butch Baldassari =

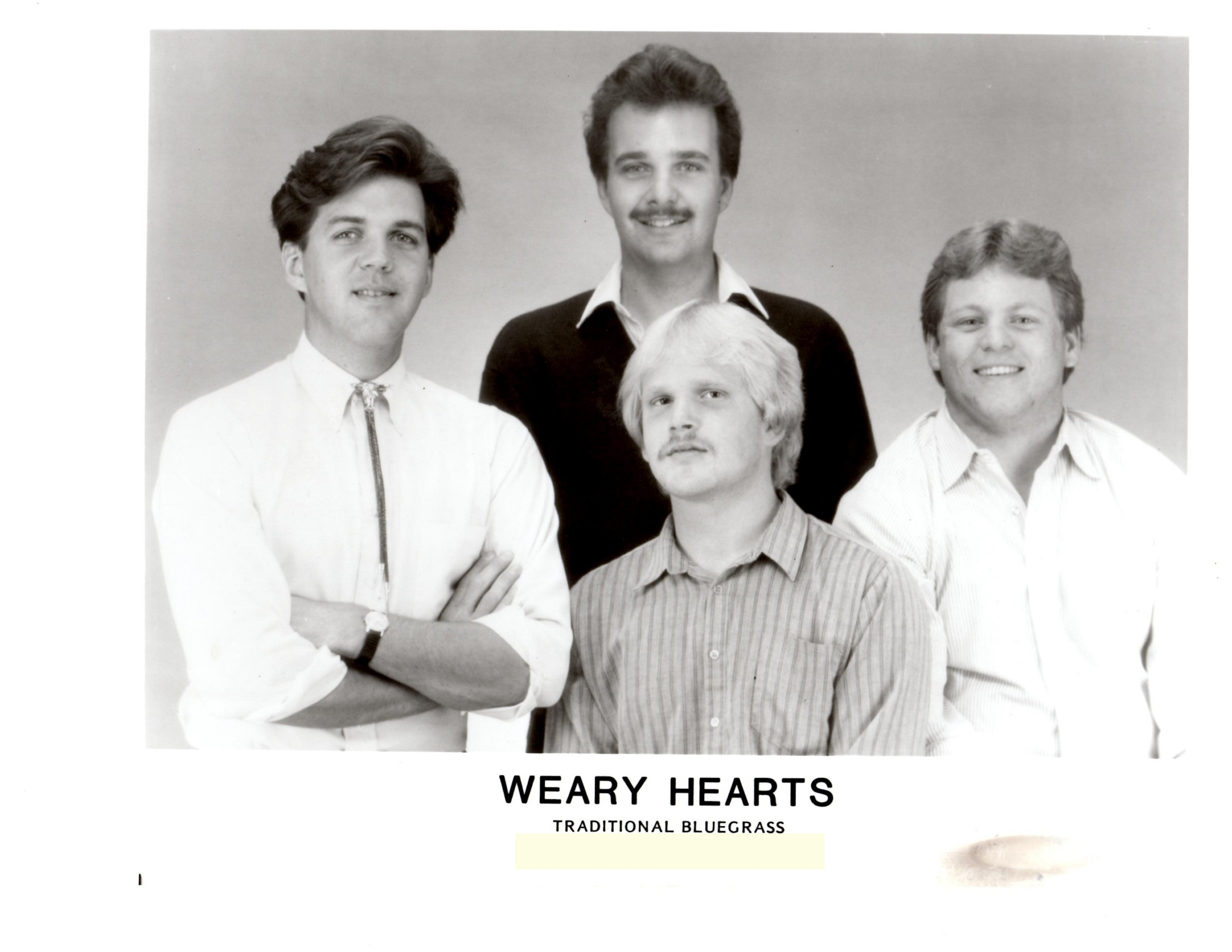
- Baldassari (left) with the Weary Hearts bluegrass band.

Background information
- Born: Jerome Henry Baldassari; December 11, 1952; Scranton, Pennsylvania
- Died: January 10, 2009 (aged 56) Nashville, Tennessee
- Genres: Bluegrass music, jazz music, Celtic music, classical music
- Occupation: Musician
- Instrument: Mandolin
- Years active: 1989–2009
- Labels: SoundArt Recordings
- Formerly of: Weary Hearts, the Nashville Mandolin Ensemble, Lonesome Standard Time, the Nashville Mandolin Trio
- mandola
- guitar

Jerome Henry "Butch" Baldassari (December 11, 1952 – January 10, 2009) was an American mandolinist, recording artist, composer, and music teacher.

== Biography ==
=== Early life ===
Baldassari played guitar in rock bands as a teen with his brother Buster, but converted to mandolin in 1972 at the Philadelphia Folk Festival when he saw Andy Statman with David Bromberg and Barry Mitterhoff with the Bottle Hill Boys.

=== Weary Hearts ===
While completing postgraduate work at the University of Nevada, Baldassari joined the bluegrass band Weary Hearts. He was a member of the band from 1986 to 1990. Besides Baldassari, the band included Mike Bub (bass), Ron Block (banjo, guitar), and Chris Jones (guitar). In 1988, they won the Best Bluegrass Band Award by the Society for the Preservation of Bluegrass Music in America (SPBGMA).

=== The Nashville Mandolin Ensemble ===
Baldassari moved to Nashville in 1985, and founded the Nashville Mandolin Ensemble in 1990. Their musical repertoire included bluegrass, classical, Celtic, and jazz, and they revived the 19th-century mandolin orchestra concept: 11 musicians incorporating mandocello, mandola, guitar and bass.

=== Lonesome Standard Time ===
From 1992 until 1998, Baldassari was a member of the bluegrass band Lonesome Standard Time with Larry Cordle (vocals, guitar), Glen Duncan (violin), Keith Little (banjo, guitar), Robin Smith (bass), and Charlie Cushman (guitar). Their 1992 album Lonesome River Band was nominated for a Grammy, and the song "Lonesome Standard Time" was named Song of the Year by the International Bluegrass Music Association in 1993.

=== The Grass is Greener ===
In 1995, Baldassari performed with violinist Richard Greene in his band The Grass is Greener. Their 1997 album Sales Tax Toddle was nominated for a Grammy.

=== The Nashville Mandolin Trio ===
The Nashville Mandolin Trio consisted of Baldassari, Gene Ford (guitar) and John Hedgecoth (mandocello), and recorded several albums on the SoundArt label.

=== Leavin' Tennessee ===
Baldassari's final recording project Leavin' Tennessee was a collaboration with guitarist Van Manakas. It was released August 29, 2010 on SoundArt. Other musicians involved with the project included Stuart Duncan and Bobby Hicks (fiddle), Scott Vestal (banjo), and Byron House (bass).

=== SoundArt Recordings label ===
Baldassari established the SoundArt Recordings record label in the late 1990s. SoundArt specializes in acoustic mandolin music and instruction, ranging from classical to bluegrass.

=== Music education ===
Starting in 1986, Baldassari taught at Vanderbilt University's Blair School of Music for several years, achieving the rank of adjunct professor of mandolin.

In addition, Baldassari released a series of mandolin instruction books, CDs, and DVDs via Homespun Music Instruction.

=== Pa's Fiddle Project ===
Baldassari and Professor of Musicology Dale Cockrell co-produced the Pa's Fiddle Project, a projected 10 CD series that will record and collect the 127 songs Pa Ingalls played in the "Little House" books by Laura Ingalls Wilder.

Baldassari was involved in the production of the first two CDs in the series: Arkansas Traveler and Happy Land: Musical Tributes to Laura Ingalls Wilder. He also performed on The Pa's Fiddle Primer CD which accompanies the PBS TV special Pa's Fiddle: The Music of America.

Happy Land: Musical Tributes to Laura Ingalls Wilder is part of the We the People National Endowment for the Humanities collection, which is distributed to 2,000 public, school, and military libraries in the United States and overseas.

=== Blue Moon Over Kentucky ===
On October 26, 2002, Baldassari and the Owensboro Symphony Orchestra premiered "Blue Moon Over Kentucky", his orchestrated tribute to the instrumental music of Bill Monroe, and incorporated standards such as "Roanoke" and "Rawhide."

=== Death ===
In May 2007, Baldassari was diagnosed as having an inoperable brain tumor and died Saturday, January 10, 2009, in Nashville at age 56. He was survived by his mother, wife, and son.

== Discography ==
=== Solo albums ===
- 1987: What's Doin' (Cactus) with Elek Bacsik (as Mr Elbak, pseudonym)
- 1990: Evergreen: Mandolin Music for Christmas (SoundArt)
- 1994: Old Town (Rebel)
- 1998: Cantabile: Duets For Mandolin And Guitar (SoundArt) with John Mock
- 1998: New Classics for Bluegrass Mandolin (SoundArt)
- 1999: Reflections (SoundArt) with John Carlini
- 2002: Silent Sound: Nightfall (Spring Hill) with David Hoffner
- 2003: Romance In Venice (Spring Hill) with Jack Jezzro
- 2004: Travellers (SoundArt) with Robin Bullock and John Reischman
- 2006: A Day in the Country (SoundArt)
- 2007: The Vespa Love Festival Sessions (CD Baby)
- 2007: Music of O'Carolan (SoundArt) with John Mock
- 2010: Leavin' Tennessee (SoundArt) with Van Manakas

=== As a member of Weary Heart ===
- 1987: Faith Is The Answer (Cactus)
- 1989: By Heart (Flying Fish)

=== As a member of The Nashville Mandolin Ensemble ===
- 1995: Plectrasonics (CMH)
- 1996: Gifts (Sony Music)
- 1998: All the Rage (New World)
- 2004: Bach, Beatles, Bluegrass (SoundArt)
- 2006: Nashville Mandolin Ensemble – Classical (SoundArt)

=== As a member of Lonesome Standard Time ===
- 1992: Lonesome River Band (Sugar Hill)
- 1993: Mighty Lonesome (Sugar Hill)
- 1995: As Lonesome as It Gets (Sugar Hill)

=== As a member of The Grass is Greener ===
- 1996: Wolves A Howlin' (Rebel)
- 1997: Sales Tax Toddle (Rebel)

=== As a member of the Nashville Mandolin Trio ===
- 1999: American Portraits (SoundArt)

=== As contributing artist ===
- 2003: various artists – The Mandolin Tribute to Andrea Bocelli (CMH)
- 2012: various artists – Pa's Fiddle: Charles Ingalls, American Fiddler (Pa's Fiddle)

=== As producer ===
- 2006: various artists – Happy Land: Musical Tributes To Laura Ingalls Wilder (Pa's Fiddle)
- 2006: various artists – The Arkansas Traveler: Music from Little House on the Prairie (Pa's Fiddle)

=== Also appears on ===
- 1992: Luke & Jenny Anne Bulla – Luke & Jenny Anne Bulla (Rounder)
- 1992: various artists – All Night Gang: Bluegrass From Nashville (Rebel)
- 1993: Bob Kogut – Heart of the Mountains (Pinecastle)
- 1994: Chubby Wise – Chubby Wise in Nashville (Pinecastle)
- 1994: Kevin Williamson – Write Between the Lines (Pinecastle)
- 1995: George Ducas – George Ducas (Capitol Nashville)
- 1998: Taliesin Orchestra – Maiden of Mysteries: The Music of Enya (Intersound Records)
- 1999: David Amram – Southern Stories (Chrome)
- 2000: Dead Grass – Dead Grass Featuring Vassar Clements (Cedar Glen)
- 2000: various artists – Pickin' on the Allman Brothers (CMH)
- 2001: Maro Kawabata – Carolina Blue (Copper Creek)
- 2003: Bluegrass All-Stars – Play Country Classics (Varèse Sarabande)
- 2003: various artists – Blue Ridge Mountain Mandolin (Pinecastle)
- 2004: Montana Skies – Chasing the Sun (Sonic Grapefruit)
- 2007: Kathy Chiavola – Somehow (My)
- 2008: Craig Duncan and the Smoky Mountain Band – Bluegrass Jamboree (Green Hill)
- 2012: various artists – To Rome With Love Motion Picture Soundtrack (Sony Classical)

=== Tribute albums ===
- 2009: Road Home, a Tribute to Butch Baldassari (SoundArt)

=== Music instruction videos ===
- 1996: You Can Play Bluegrass Mandolin Vol. 1 DVD (Homespun)
- 1996: You Can Play Bluegrass Mandolin Vol. 2 DVD (Homespun)
- 1997: Thirty Fiddle Tunes for the Mandolin CD (Homespun)
- 2003: Mandolin Tunes for Practice and Repertoire book/ CD (Homespun)
- 2004: Butch Baldassari's Bluegrass Mandolin Workshop DVD (Homespun)
- 2008: Mandolin Hymns CD (Homespun)
- 2008: Appalachian Mandolin & Dulcimer book/ CD (Homespun) with David Schnaufer
- 2013: Mandolin Jam Along book/ CD (Homespun) with Matt Flinner

=== Music books ===
- 1995: Evergreen: Mandolin Music for Christmas (Mel Bay)
- 2001: New Classics for Bluegrass Mandolin (Mel Bay)
- 2015: Cantabile: Duets for Mandolin and Guitar (Mel Bay) with John Mock
