= Taliesin (disambiguation) =

Taliesin was a 6th-century Welsh poet and bard.

Taliesin may also refer to:

- Book of Taliesin, a medieval Welsh manuscript containing poetry attributed to the bard
- Taliesin (studio), a studio of Frank Lloyd Wright in Spring Green, Wisconsin
  - Taliesin West, Frank Lloyd Wright's studio in Scottsdale, Arizona, USA
- Taliesin Arts Centre, in Swansea, Wales
- Taliesin Junior School, a school in Shotton, Flintshire, Wales
- Taliesin Orchestra, an orchestra that specializes in remaking famous songs into orchestral melodies
- The Book of Taliesyn, an album by Deep Purple
- Taliesin, a Fairlie locomotive owned by the Ffestiniog railway
- Taliesin, a 1987 novel in The Pendragon Cycle by Stephen R. Lawhead

== People with the given name ==
- Taliesin Jaffe, American voice actor and director
- Taliesin Selley, Welsh rugby player

== See also ==
- Tre-Taliesin, a village in Ceredigion, Wales, UK
