= Pax Deorum =

Pax Deorum may refer to:

- "Pax Deorum", a song from The Memory of Trees, an album by Enya
- "Pax Deorum", a cover of the aforementioned song from the album Maiden of Mysteries: The Music of Enya, by the Taliesin Orchestra
- Pax deorum, a Latin phrase meaning "peace of the gods"
