= Mikhail Horowitz =

American poet

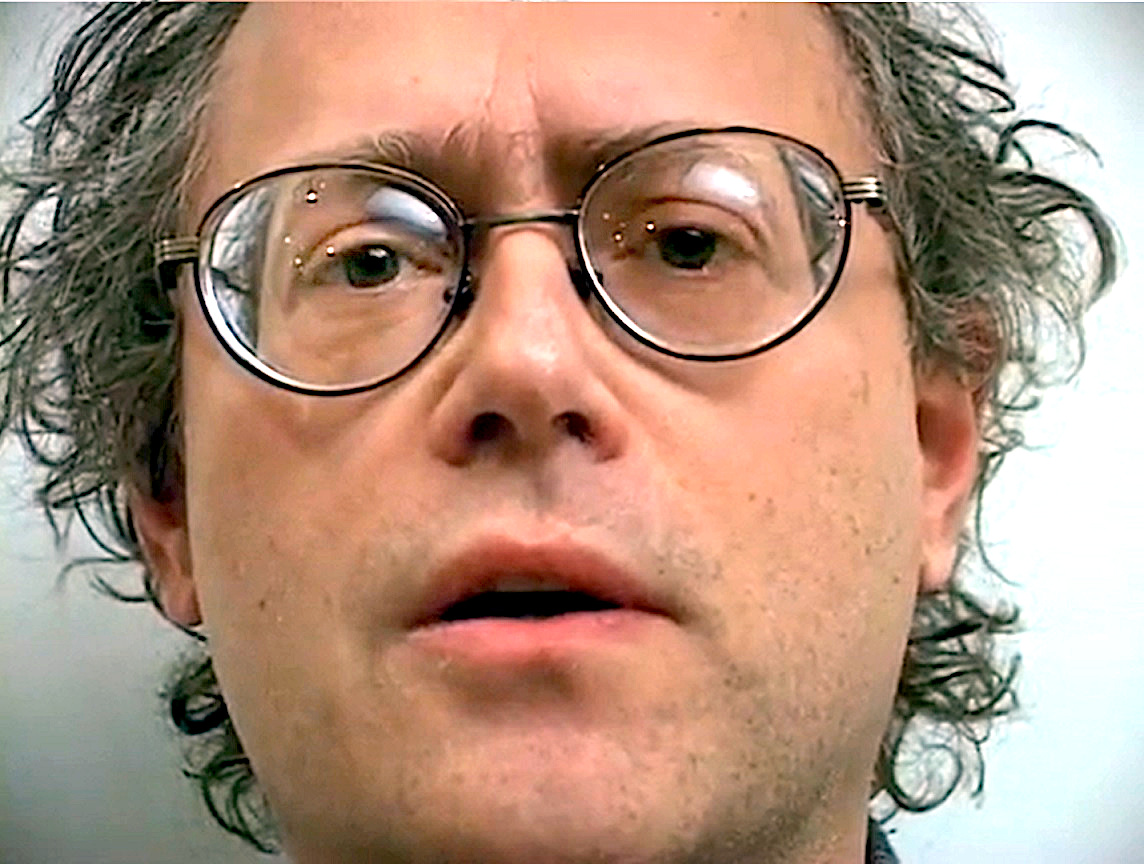
- Mikhail Horowitz, circa 2003
- Born: Michael David Horowitz; January 18, 1950; Brooklyn, New York, United States
- Occupations: editor, journalist, poet, performance poet, social commentator
- Spouse: Carol Zaloom

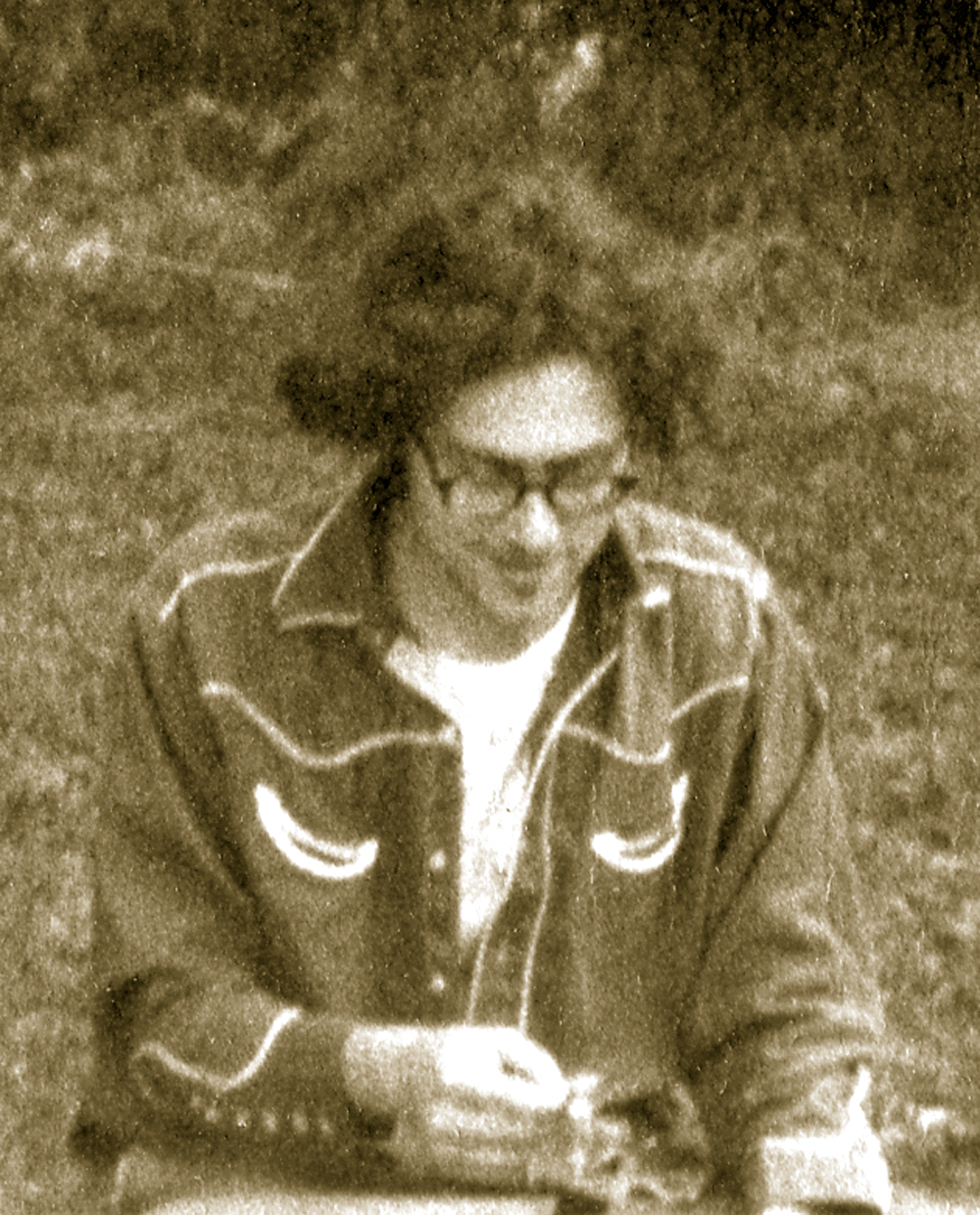
Mikhail Horowitz, circa 1970

Mikhail Horowitz (born January 18, 1950) is an American poet, performance poet, parodist, satirist, social commentator, author and editor.

== Biography / Career ==
Mikhail Horowitz was born in Brooklyn, New York. He graduated from Erasmus Hall High School in 1967 and went on to attend State University of New York at New Paltz where he performed in a production of Carlo Gozzi's Turandot. He frequented on and off-campus poetry readings and performance gigs, reading his own poetry, playing the recorder and harmonica, and performing with local musicians, including Raoul Vezina, Richard J. (Rich) Rizzi, and others. In classic '60s style, he dropped out of college in 1970 to work full-time on the Gargoyle, the Hudson Valley's first alternative or "underground" newspaper, which he helped to start in 1969 in New Paltz, Ulster County, NY – then a major center of student action, antiwar protest, assisted psychotropics, and artistic renaissance.

While working on the Gargoyle Horowitz changed his name to Mikhail ("Mik") Horowitz, as he was often confused with Michael Horovitz, a widely published post-Beat British poet who was enamored of jazz and who orchestrated the Poetry Olympics in London, and Michael Horowitz, author, activist, a friend of Timothy Leary and later the father of Winona Ryder. The deciding straw was receiving a mistakenly delivered packet of galley proofs from one of Michael Horovitz’s publishers.

Beginning in 1973, Horowitz spent five years on the road, mainly on the West Coast, as the 'Null' half of the comic duo Null and Void. 'Void' was his comedic partner Francesco (Frank) Patricolo. Horowitz referred to this collaboration as "a metaphysical stand-up tragedy team." The partnership, but not the friendship, broke up in 1978. After this, he continued to perform on his own, with musicians and a variety of performance artists in the Mid-Hudson Valley, New York. In 1989, he teamed up with Paris born/American-raised Gilles Malkine, a musician and composer. Malkine performed with Tim Hardin at the original Woodstock Festival, 1969; through the years he worked with many other musicians, including John Sebastian and Billy Faier. Horowitz and Malkine continue to perform together actively into 2009. They have presented more than 750 performances in New York, New England, Michigan, Maryland, New Mexico, Oregon, Washington (state), Ohio, and Ontario to date. Their repertoire varies greatly but often contains audience favorites, particularly routines with literary motifs and references to American culture, particularly the 60s/70s and [Jewish culture]. In 1978 City Lights books published Big League Poets, baseball card collages of imaginary historical and literary baseball players.

From 1986 through 1999, Horowitz's principal occupation was as a journalist, first with the Daily Freeman, a daily serving Kingston, N. Y., and then the Woodstock Times, whereas arts editor he was listed on the masthead as "Cultural Czar." From early in his career Horowitz was performing music. He plays blues harmonica and alto, soprano, and sopranino recorders, and occasionally blows kazoo, pennywhistle, and various wooden flutes. These instruments are a regular part of his performances. He maintains a unique style of recorder playing, as it is cocked to the side of his mouth as one might imagine impish Pan might hold it.

As a performance poet and stand-up cultural commentator/singer, Horowitz has performed at hundreds of diverse venues, from the Village Gate, Westbeth Theater, and the Image Theater, in New York City with repeated visits to the 92nd Street Y; the Bumbershoot Festival, Seattle, Washington, the Taos Poetry Circus, Taos, New Mexico, a variety of not-so orthodox synagogues; the Rosendale Caves, Rosendale, New York; a headliner at several the Woodstock Poetry Festivals and many other events in Woodstock; Unison, New Paltz, NY; Clearwater Great Hudson River Revival Festival in Croton, New York; and many other locales. His solo poetry, prose, and artwork continue to be published in numerous anthologies, including City Lights Journal, The Stiffest of the Corpse, The Outlaw Bible of American Poetry, Brilliant Corners, Elysian Fields Quarterly, and Yellow Silk Anthology. He has collaborated with or shared the bill with, Charles Mingus, Peter "P.D.Q. Bach" Schickele, Allen Ginsberg, Ed Sanders & The Fugs, Robert Bly, Bob Holman, David Amram, Marilyn Crispell, Andrei Codrescu, Artie Traum and Happy Traum, Jay Ungar, Molly Mason, Phil Donahue, Amy Goodman, Natalie Merchant, Kate Pierson (B-52s), Raoul Vezina, and Ron Whiteurs, among many others. Through the years, Horowitz's stage style and content have been compared to Lenny Bruce, Lord Buckley, and sometimes, mistakenly, to Brother Theodore. Horowitz's style is both more playful and erudite, with a Shakespearian penchant for satisfying the audience's predilection for the bawdy.

As of 1989, Horowitz lived in Saugerties, New York with his partner of over 20 years, artist/illustrator Carol Zaloom. He has for several years remained on the editorial staff of Bard College Publications, Bard College, Annandale-on-Hudson, NY. He is a member of Actors & Writers, based in Olivebridge, New York.

== Books ==
- Big League Poets (City Lights, 1978)
- The Opus of Everything in Nothing Flat (Outloud/Red Hill, 1993)
- Rafting into the Afterlife (Codhill Press, 2007)
- Ancient Baseball (Alte Books, 2019)

== Selected anthologies ==
- Laugh Lines (Vintage Books, 2007)
- Line Drives (South Illinois University Press, 2002)
- The Outlaw Bible of American Poetry (Thunder's Mouth, 1999)
- Baseball Diamonds (Doubleday)
- Yellow Silk (Crown)
- The Sacred Theory of the Earth (North Atlantic Books)

== Selected journals, magazines, and papers ==
Abraxas, Archae, Arson, Brilliant Corners, Chiron, City Lights Journal, Davka, Elysian Fields Quarterly, Exquisite Corpse, Graffiti Rag, Hanging Loose, Heaven Bone, Hunger, Io, Long Shot, Matter, New York Times, Pig Iron, Rattle, Spitball, White Pine Journal

== CDs ==
- The Blues of the Birth (Euphoria Jazz!/Sundazed, 1999)
- Live, Jive & Over 45 (with Gilles Malkine, self-produced, 2000)
- Poor, On Tour, & Over 54 (with Gilles Malkine, self-produced, 2007)

== DVDs ==
"Too Small To Fail" (with Gilles Malkine, a Carlos Fernandez Dish, 2011)

== Compilation CDs ==
- Bring It On Home, Vol. II (Columbia/Legacy Records)
- Unison Arts 25 Years Compilation Album (private release)
- Several of the Diamond Cuts CDs issued by Hungry for Music, 2002–08
- A Chanukah Feast (Hungry for Music)
