= Songs of Our Fathers =

Studio album by David Grisman, Andy Statman
- Released: 1995
- Genre: Americana, newgrass, jazz, Klezmer
- Label: Rounder
- Producer: David Grisman

David Grisman, Andy Statman chronology
Mandolin Abstractions (1983)	Songs of Our Fathers (1995)	New Shabbos Waltz (1995)

David Grisman chronology
Dawganova (1995)	Songs of Our Fathers (1995)	Tone Poems 2 (1995)

Songs of Our Fathers is an album by American musicians David Grisman and Andy Statman, released in 1995. It's a collection of Jewish songs, many of which are more than 100 years old. Much of the music is influenced by the Jewish instrumental folk music of Eastern Europe known as Klezmer.

== Track listing ==
All songs traditional except for tracks 2a, 3, 7, and 9 by Shlomo Carlebach and track 5 by Andy Statman.

1. "Shalom Aleichem"
2. "Chassidic Medley: Adir Hu/Moshe Emes"
3. "Shomer Yisrael"
4. "Toska"
5. "Bashie's Bounce"
6. "Dovid Melech Yisrael"
7. "Shabbos Waltz"
8. "For the Sake of My Brothers and Friends"
9. "Der Rebbe"
10. "Adon Olam"
11. "Kazatski"
12. "Shalom Aleichem"

== Personnel ==
- David Grisman – mandolin
- Andy Statman – clarinet, mandolin
- Hal Blaine – drums
- Edgar Meyer – bass
- Zachariah Spellman – tuba
- Enrique Coria – guitar
- Jim Kerwin – bass
