= Spencer Bohren =

American singer-songwriter (1950–2019)

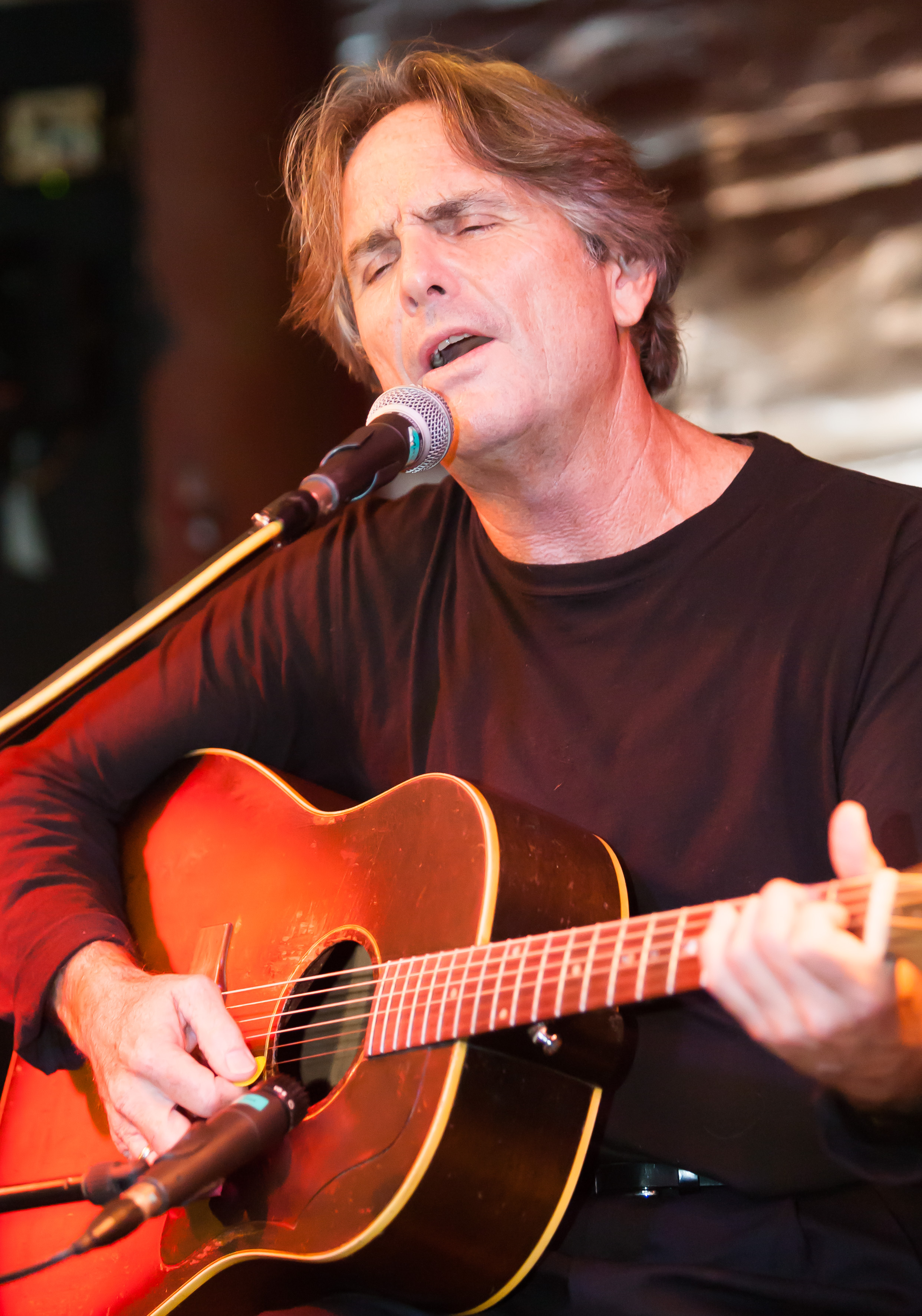
Spencer Bohren (2007)

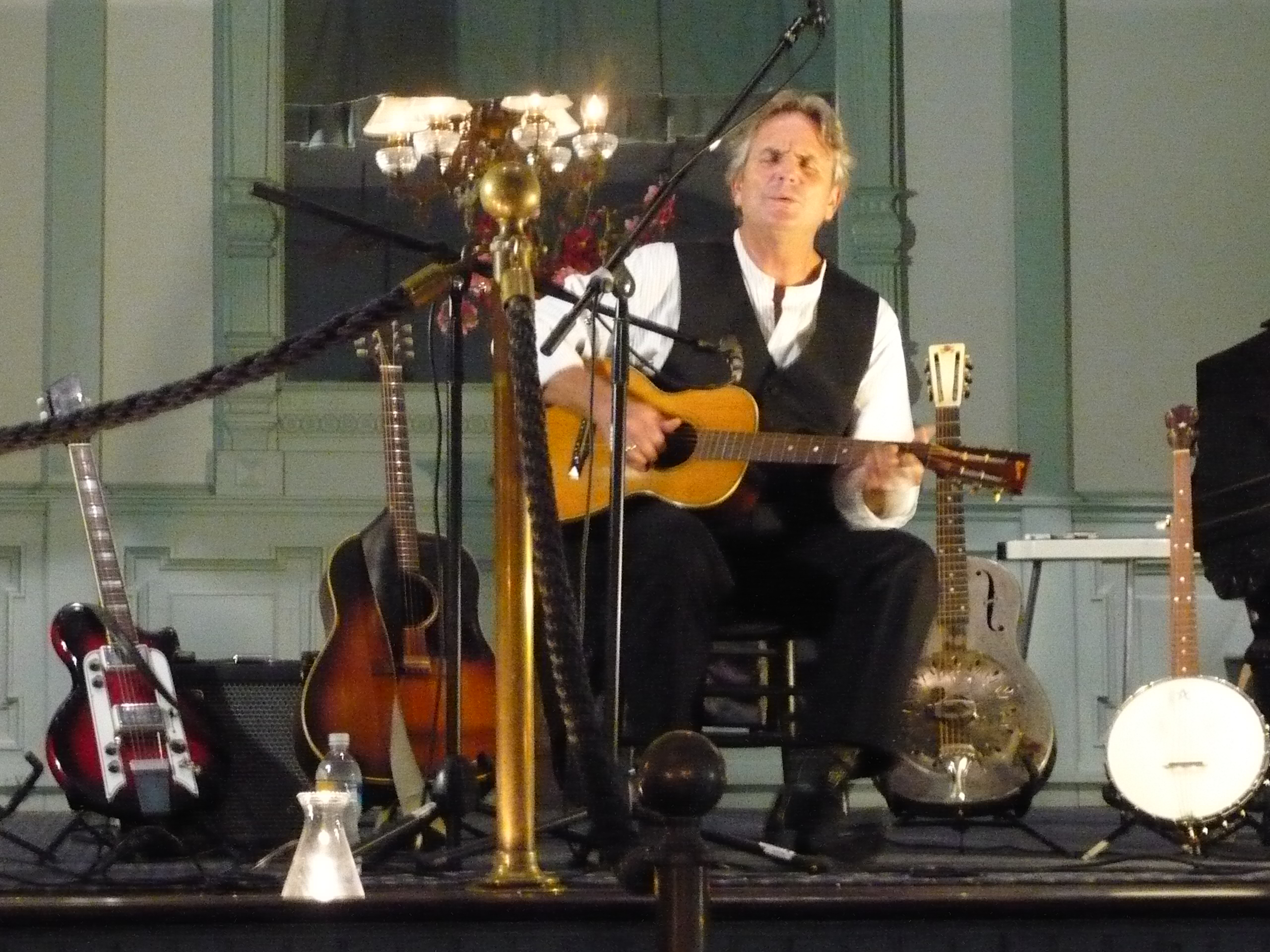
Spencer Bohren performing as part of his Down the Dirt Road Blues lecture-performance at the G.A.R. Hall in Peninsula, Ohio United States.

Spencer Ward Bohren (April 5, 1950 – June 8, 2019) was an American roots musician, singer, songwriter, teacher, and visual artist. He played guitar, lap steel guitar, banjo, and percussion, and utilized the roots of American traditional music to write songs in blues, country, gospel and folk styles. He has released fourteen albums since 1984.

== Biography ==
Bohren's maternal ancestry is Scots-Irish, and his father's family came from Alsace-Lorraine. Born in Casper, Wyoming, he grew up in a Baptist family in Wyoming and spent time in Denver and Boulder, Colorado, southern Oregon, and Seattle, Washington in the early part of his career. In 1976 he began raising a family with his wife, Marilyn, in New Orleans, Louisiana.

Bohren performed throughout the United States as well as in Canada, England, Ireland, Scotland, France, Italy, Germany, Belgium, the Netherlands, Sweden, Norway, Denmark, Switzerland, Spain, Mexico, and Japan. He has performed on the A Prairie Home Companion radio program and at the New Orleans Jazz & Heritage Festival. He has also taught at the Fur Peace Ranch. In the late 1970s and early 1980s he hosted a weekly Monday-night jam session at the Tipitina's music club in New Orleans.

Although he most often worked as a soloist, he performed in several bands, including the Funston Brothers, the Eagle-Ridin' Papa, Butterfat, Rufus Krisp, the Earthtones, and Gone Johnson. He collaborated with folk blues performer Judy Roderick, diesel-billy guitarist Bill Kirchen, opera singer Karen Clift, Dr. John, the Blind Boys of Alabama, and the vocal duo The Tremors.

In the academic world, Bohren presented a musical overview of American roots music, a lecture-performance entitled Down the Dirt Road Blues, which traces the journey of a single song, "Dirt Road Blues," from Africa to the days of slavery in the American South, through the modern age. He used appropriate vintage instruments to orchestrate the story as the song evolves from a simple vocal melody to a blues song, a dance number, a hillbilly banjo piece, a country hit, and into the age of rock 'n' roll.

His CD Carry the Word was named "Best CD of the Year 2000 by a Louisiana Artist" by The Times-Picayune of New Orleans, and he has won the New Orleans Gambit Weekly's "Big Easy Award for Best Folk Artist" several times.

He recorded for the Virgin, Sony/France, Valve, Zephyr, Public Road, Last Call, Loft, Alpha, Great Southern, and New Blues labels.

Also a visual artist, Bohren created artworks that he calls "Reliquaries" and shares his philosophy and techniques with interested students of all ages.

Spencer Bohren and his wife Marilyn lived in New Orleans and home-schooled their four children. The family home suffered significant damage during Hurricane Katrina and Bohren wrote the song "Long Black Line" about the experience.

He appears in television drama HBO's "Treme" in 2012.

He died on June 8, 2019.

== Discography ==
=== As leader ===
- 1984 - Born in a Biscayne (New Blues)
- 1986 – Down in Mississippi (New Blues)
- 1989 - Snap your Fingers (Loft Records)
- 1989 – Live in New Orleans (Great Southern)
- 1989 - Totta & Hot 'n' Tots featuring Spencer Bohren
- 1991 - Full Moon (Loft Records)
- 1994 – Vintage (Zephyr Artists)
- 1994 - Present Tense (Sony/France)
- 1997 – Dirt Roads (Zephyr Artists; rereleased in 1998 by Last Call)
- 2000 – Carry the Word (Zephyr Artists)
- 2002 – Solitaire (Valve)
- 2004 – Southern Cross (Valve)
- 2005 – Down the Dirt Road Blues (Zephyr)
- 2006 – The Long Black Line (Valve)
- 2008 – Live at the Tube Temple (Valve)
- 2010 – The Blues according to Hank Williams(Valve #2987)
- 2011 – Blackwater Music (Threadhead Records and Valve #4487)
- 2012 – Born in a Biscayne (Valve #3487)
- 2013 - Tempered Steel
- 2015 - Seven Birds
- 2018 - Makin' it Home To You (with The Whippersnappers)(Valve #7887)
