= DGBX =

Studio album by David Grisman
- Released: 2006
- Genre: Bluegrass
- Label: Acoustic Disc
- Producer: David Grisman

David Grisman chronology
Dawg's Groove (2006)	DGBX (2006)	New Shabbos Waltz (2006)

Professional ratings
Review scores
Source	Rating
Allmusic	4/5 stars

DGBX (David Grisman Bluegrass Experience), is a collection of bluegrass songs by David Grisman and his band, DGBX.

== Track listing ==
1. I'm Rollin' On (trad.)
2. Baby Blue Eyes (Eanes)
3. Engine 143 (Carter)
4. The Baltimore Fire (Poole)
5. Rubens Train (trad.)
6. Dream of the Miner's Child (trad.)
7. Dawggy Mt. Breakdown (Grisman)
8. Rock Hearts (Otis)
9. Say Won't You Be Mine (Stanley)
10. You'll Be a Lost Ball (Martin)
11. Down the Road (Flatt / Scruggs)
12. Old and in the Way (Grisman)
13. Are You Afraid to Die? (trad.)
14. There Ain't Nobody Gonna Miss Me When I'm Gone (McCauliffe)

== Personnel ==
- David Grisman - mandolin, vocals
- Samson Grisman - bass
- Jim Nunally - guitar, vocals
- Keith Little - banjo, guitar, vocals
- Chad Manning - fiddle
