= New River (album) =

Studio album by David Grisman, Danny Zeitlin
- Released: 2001
- Recorded: June 26, 2001
- Studios: Dawg Studios, Mill Valley, California
- Genres: Bluegrass, country
- Length: 59:40
- Label: Acoustic Disc
- Producer: David Grisman

David Grisman chronology
Grateful Dawg (2001)	New River (2001)	Traversata (2001)

Danny Zeitlin chronology
Live at the Jazz Bakery (1999)	New River (2001)	Slick Rock (2004)

Professional ratings
Review scores
Source	Rating
Allmusic	4/5 stars

New River is an album by mandolinist David Grisman and jazz pianist Denny Zeitlin that was released in 2001. Half the songs were written by Grisman, half by Zeitlin, with one a collaboration.

== Track listing ==
1. "Brazilian Street Dance" (Zeitlin) – 7:09
2. "Dawg Funk "(Grisman) – 5:47
3. "Moving Parts" (Zeitlin) – 4:53
4. "Blue Midnite" (Grisman) – 4:57
5. "New River" (Zeitlin) – 5:44
6. "Waltz for Gigi" (Grisman) – 4:27
7. "DG/DZ Blues" (Grisman, Zeitlin) – 8:47
8. "On the March" (Zeitlin) – 10:31
9. "Fourteen Miles to Barstow" (Grisman) – 7:25

== Personnel ==
- David Grisman – mandolin
- Denny Zeitlin – piano
