= Grateful Dawg =

- Theatrical release poster
- Directed by: Gillian Grisman
- Produced by: Gillian Grisman and Pamela Hamilton
- Cinematography: Justin Kreutzmann
- Edited by: Josh Baron
- Music by: Jerry Garcia and Gillian Grisman
- Release date: 2000
- Running time: 81 minutes
- Country: United States
- Language: English

Grateful Dawg is a documentary film released in 2000 which chronicles the friendship and musical collaboration of musicians Jerry Garcia and David Grisman. Director and producer Gillian Grisman uses multiple videos, as well as live recordings, to help show this bond between two friends and musicians. It gives a view of Garcia outside the Grateful Dead.

== Synopsis ==
The film was directed by David Grisman’s daughter Gillian, with cinematography by Justin Kreutzmann, son of Grateful Dead drummer Bill Kreutzmann. The film details when Grisman and Garcia first met in 1964 at a club in Pennsylvania to see Bill Monroe perform, includes interviews with musicians such as Bela Fleck, Peter Rowan and Ronnie McCoury and many live performances of Grisman and Garcia.

== DVD ==
The Grateful Dawg DVD has the following chapters:

1. Start
2. "Grateful Dawg" (Live)
3. Early Pickin'
4. "The Sweet Sunny South"
5. Old and in the Way
6. "Pig in a Pen"
7. Sweetwater Reunion
8. "Dawg's Waltz"
9. "Sitting Here in Limbo"
10. Sea Shanties
11. "Off to Sea Once More"
12. Not for Kids Only
13. "Jenny Jenkins"
14. "Arabia" Intro
15. "Arabia"
16. "The Thrill is Gone" Intro
17. "The Thrill is Gone"
18. The Living Room
19. "Friend of the Devil"
20. End Credits

== See also ==
- Grateful Dawg (soundtrack)
