= Beers Family =

American traditional folk music group

The Beers Family was an American traditional folk music group that performed and recorded between 1958 and 1972. The members of the group were Robert Beers (sometimes billed as "Fiddler" Beers), his wife Evelyne Beers, and their daughter Martha Beers. The group was well known for performing at the Fox Hollow Festival, a folk music festival held on the Beers' farm near Petersburgh, New York, every year between 1964 and 1980, and at the Philadelphia Folk Festival eight years between 1964 and 1972. They also performed at the Mariposa Folk Festival in Orillia, Ontario, Canada, appearing in 1966 and 1968. The group was part of a folkloric program to present American music to international audiences, playing concerts through the State Department of the United States in Port of Spain, Trinidad. The group ended after Bob Beers was killed in an automobile accident in Vermont in 1972.

== Discography ==
=== Albums ===
- Introducing the Beers Family (Columbia Masterworks, 1965)
- Christmas with the Beers Family (Columbia, 1966)
- Seasons of Peace (Biograph, 1971)
