= Grateful Dawg (soundtrack) =

Soundtrack album by Jerry Garcia and David Grisman
- Released: September 11, 2001
- Genre: Progressive bluegrass, new acoustic
- Label: Acoustic Disc

Jerry Garcia and David Grisman chronology
The Pizza Tapes (2000)	Grateful Dawg (2001)	Been All Around This World (2004)

Jerry Garcia chronology
Shining Star (2001)	Grateful Dawg (2001)	Been All Around This World (2004)

David Grisman chronology
The Pizza Tapes (2000)	Grateful Dawg (2001)	New River (2001)

Professional ratings
Review scores
Source	Rating
Allmusic	4/5 stars
The Music Box	3/5 stars

Grateful Dawg is the soundtrack to the 2000 film of the same name. It is a collaboration between Jerry Garcia and David Grisman. It was released on the Acoustic Disc record label.

== Track listing ==
1. "Intro"
2. "Grateful Dawg (Live)"
3. "Wayfaring Stranger" - Bill Monroe And His Blue Grass Boys
4. "Sweet Sunny South"
5. "Old and in the Way Intro" - Peter Rowan
6. "Pig In A Pen" - Old & In the Way
7. "Dawg's Waltz"
8. "Sitting Here in Limbo"
9. "Off to Sea Once More" - Ewan MacColl
10. "Off to Sea Once More"
11. "Jenny Jenkins"
12. "Arabia"
13. "The Thrill Is Gone"
14. "Friend of the Devil"
15. "Grateful Dawg (studio)"

== Personnel ==
- Joe Craven – percussion, violin
- Jerry Garcia – arranger, banjo, guitar, vocals
- David Grisman – arranger, banjo, mandola, mandolin, vocals
- Jim Kerwin – bass, acoustic bass

Production:

- David Dennison – engineer, mixing
- David Gahr – photography
- D. Brent Hauseman – design, layout design
- Nobuharu Komoriya – photography
- Craig Miller – executive producer
- Susana Millman – photography
- Gary Nichols – photography
- Jon Sievert – photography
- Owsley Stanley – engineer
- Paul Stubblebine – mastering
