= Traversata =

Studio album by David Grisman, Beppe Gambetta, Carlo Aonzo
- Released: 2001
- Studio: Dawg Studios
- Genre: Italian folk
- Length: 51:14
- Label: Acoustic Disc
- Producer: David Grisman

David Grisman chronology
New River (2001)	Traversata (2001)	Old & In the Gray (2002)

Professional ratings
Review scores
Source	Rating
Allmusic	4/5 stars

Traversata is an album by American mandolinist David Grisman, Italian mandolinist Carlo Aonzo, and Italian guitarist Beppe Gambetta, playing guitar, mandolin, and the 14-string harp guitar.

The album comprises Italian-American instrumentals from the early part of the 20th century when Italians migrated in large numbers to the U.S. They called their trip overseas a traversata. In addition to traditional Italian folk music, the album includes versions of "Pickin' the Guitar" by Nick Lucas and "April Kisses" by Eddie Lang.

== Track listing ==
1. Costumi Siciliani (Sicilian Customs) (Giovanni Gioviale) 4:08
2. Oh, Mio Babbino Caro (Oh, My Dear Daddy from Gianni Schicchi) (Giacomo Puccini) 2:20
3. Idillio Primaverile (Idyll of Springtime) (Gioviale) 2:53
4. Manzanillo (Valentine Abt) 2:23
5. L'Onda (The Wave) (Pasquale Taraffo) 4:04
6. Tarantella Op. 18 (Raffaele Calace) 3:04
7. Intermezzo (from Cavalleria rusticana) (Pietro Mascagni) (3:04)
8. Pickin' the Guitar (Pizzicando la Chitarra) (Nick Lucas) 3:43
9. Violinata (Violin Serenade) (Attilio Margutti) 2:40
10. Duo for Two Mandolins (Studio per Due Mandolini) (Rudy Cipolla) 3:30
11. Valtzer Fantastico (Wonder Waltz) (Enrico Marucelli) 5:34
12. The Godfather Waltz (Il Valzer del Padrino, from The Godfather) (Nino Rota) 2:55
13. Mazurka VI Op. 141 (Calace) 2:55
14. Serenata "a Ballo" (traditional) 3:14
15. April Kisses (Baci d'Aprile) (Eddie Lang) 5:21

== Personnel ==
- David Grisman – mandolin, mandola
- Carlo Aonzo – mandolin
- Beppe Gambetta – guitar, harp guitar
- Radim Zenkl – mandocello
