= Bill Evans (bluegrass) =

- Born: William G. Evans; September 2, 1956 (age 69); Norfolk, Virginia
- Genres: Bluegrass, old-time music, country, folk
- Occupation: Musician
- Instrument: Banjo
- Years active: 1982–present
- Labels: Native & Fine Records
- Website: www.billevansbanjo.com

William G. Evans (born September 2, 1956) is an American musician, author, and instructor noted for his banjo proficiency and knowledge of the history of the instrument.

== Biography ==
Evans earned a master's degree in Music from University of California, Berkeley in 1992, with a focus on ethnomusicology. He learned banjo in person from masters such as Tony Trischka, Alan Munde, Bill Keith, Ben Eldridge, Sonny Osborne, and J. D. Crowe.

=== Cloud Valley ===
Evans' first band was Charlottesville, Virginia-based Cloud Valley with Missy Raines (bass), Charlie Rancke (guitar), and Steve Smith (mandolin). The progressive bluegrass band released two albums: A Bluegrass Ensemble in 1983 and Live In Europe in 1985. Their final performance was in Winfield, Kansas in 1985, but Evans still collaborates with individual band members.

=== Dry Branch Fire Squad ===
For some time, Evans performed and recorded with Dry Branch Fire Squad.

=== Bluegrass Intentions ===
Evans was a member of the bluegrass ensemble Bluegrass Intentions with Suzy Thompson (fiddle, Cajun accordion, vocals), Eric Thompson (mandolin, guitar, vocals), Larry Cohea (bass, vocals), and Alan Senauke (guitar, vocals). They released one album Old as Dirt on Evans's Native and Fine record label in 2002.

=== Due West ===
Bluegrass group Due West featured Evans, Jim Nunally (guitar), Erik Thomas (mandolin), Cindy Browne (bass) and Chad Manning (fiddle). Their one album is These Boots released in 2003.

=== Bill Evans String Summit ===
The Bill Evans String Summit is Evans, Scott Nygaard (guitar), Michael Witcher (dobro), Cindy Browne (bass), Tashina Clarridge (violin), and Tristan Clarridge (violin, cello). Group members bring together their influences from their backgrounds in jazz, classical, and world music.

=== Recent collaborations ===
Evans has been touring and holding workshops several weeks each year with Alan Munde (Country Gazette). He has also been recording with long-time bluegrass fiddler Fletcher Bright. Evans tours frequently with mandolin player Steve Smith from Cloud County, and with fiddler Megan Lynch. He also has been touring with Dan Crary (guitar) and Steve Spurgin (bass).

=== Education and teaching ===
Evans has taught ethnomusicology at San Francisco State University, the University of Virginia, and Duke University. Evans gives private banjo lessons at his home in Albany, California. He also stages banjo workshops at major music festivals all over the country. Evans also offers several online banjo instruction courses on Peghead Nation.

A convocation by Evans "The Banjo in America: A Musical and Cultural History" has been presented in various venues across the country. This convocation traces the history of the banjo from West African to the New World, with performances on vintage instruments of music from the 1700s to today.

=== Music Instruction Author ===
In 2007, Wiley Publishing published the book Banjo for Dummies authored by Evans. This was followed in 2016 in by Bluegrass Banjo for Dummies.

In recent years, Evans has been the author of the "Off the Record" instructional column for Banjo Newsletter magazine.

Evans and Dix Bruce co-authored the Parking Lot Pickers Songbook published by Mel Bay Publications.

=== Endorsements ===
American Made Banjo Company created the Bill Evans Signature Series 5 String Kel Kroydon banjo.

=== Awards ===
In 2024, Evans was inducted into the American Banjo Hall of Fame in the Instruction & Education category.

Evans was awarded Steve Martin Banjo Prize on November 10, 2022.

The album "Bill Evans Plays Banjo" was cited by the Chicago Tribune as a Top 10 Bluegrass Recording of 2001.

In 1997, Evans was awarded a musical composition fellowship by the Kentucky Arts Council.

In 1996, Evan's album Native and Fine earned an honorable mention in the category of Acoustic Instrumental Recording of the Year from the NAIRD (National Association of Independent Record Retailers and Distributors).

== Discography ==
=== Solo albums ===
- 1995: Native and Fine (Rounder)
- 2001: Plays Banjo (Mighty Fine)
- 2009: ...Let's Do Something... (Native and Fine) with Megan Lynch
- 2012: In Good Company (Native and Fine)
- 2013: Fine Times at Fletcher's House (Native and Fine) with Fletcher Bright
- 2016: Songs That Are Mostly Older Than Us (Native and Fine) with Fletcher Bright, Norman Blake, and Nancy Blake

=== As a member of Cloud Valley ===
- 1982: A Bluegrass Ensemble (Outlet)
- 1985: Live In Europe (Strictly Country)

=== As a member of Dry Branch Fire Squad ===
- 1996: Live! At Last (Rounder)

=== As a member of Bluegrass Intentions ===
- 2002: Old As Dirt (Native and Fine)

=== As a member of Due West ===
- 2003: These Boots (Native and Fine)

=== As producer ===
- 1998: Suzanne Thomas - Dear Friends & Gentle Hearts (Rounder)

=== Also appears on ===
- 1983: Alan Munde - In the Tradition (Ridge Runner) - banjo on track 3, "Five by Two"
- 1999: Buckeye - Buckeye (B Music)
- 2000: Enzo Garcia - Words (Recaredo)
- 2001: Kathy Kallick - My Mother's Voice (Copper Creek)
- 2004: Chad Manning - Old Gnarly Oak (Tricopolis)
- 2007: Jim Nunally - Gloria's Waltz (FGM)
- 2008: Los Cenzontles - Los Senn-Sont-Less (self-released)
- 2008: Tony Trischka - Territory (Smithsonian Folkways)
- 2010: Steve Smith, Chris Sanders, and Hard Road - Signs Along the Road (self-released)
- 2012: Mike McKinley - Bindlestiff (Sand Rabbit)
- 2012: Bill Emerson and the Sweet Dixie Band - The Touch of Time (Rural Rhythm)
- 2012: Jody Stecher - Wonders & Signs (Vegetiboy)

=== Music Instruction ===
==== DVDs ====
- 2003: Power Pickin' Vol. 1: Up the Neck Backup for Bluegrass Banjo (AccuTab)
- 2005: The Bluegrass Banjo of Sonny Osborne (Accutab) hosted by Bill Evans and Tom Adler
- 2010: Power Pickin' Vol. 3: Playing Banjo Backup in a Bluegrass Band (AccuTab)
- 2010: Power Pickin' Vol. 4: Power Pickin Vol. 4: Bluegrass Banjo Master Claas (AccuTab)
- 2012: Harmony Singing Made Easy DVD (Murphy Method) with Janet Beazley, Chris Stuart, and Murphy Henry
- 2013: Bluegrass Banjo Favorites (Homespun)
- 2016: Bluegrass Banjo Licks-ercises Vol 1: Scruggs Style (Homespun)
- 2016: Bluegrass Banjo Licks-ercises Vol 2: Single String and Melodic Styles (Homespun)

==== Books ====
- 2006: Absolute Beginners: Banjo (Music Sales America) ISBN 978-0825634994
- 2007: Banjo for Dummies (Wiley) ISBN 978-0470127629
- 2007: Parking Lot Picker's Songbook: Banjo (Mel Bay) with Dix Bruce ISBN 978-0786674916
- 2015: Bluegrass Banjo For Dummies (Wiley) ISBN 978-1119004301
