= Floyd Scholz =

Floyd Scholz's book Peregrine Falcon: Dynamic Carving and Painting Techniques for a New Era.

Floyd Scholz (born February 27, 1958) is an American artist, author and musician known for his lifelike carvings of birds. He is also the author of several books, including Birds of Prey (Stackpole Books, 1993) and Owls (Stackpole Books, 2001). In June 2014 Stackpole Books published his latest work, Peregrine Falcon: Dynamic Carving and Painting Techniques for a New Era, a step-by-step demonstration of how Scholz created a carving of a life-size peregrine capturing a green-winged teal in flight.

== Background ==
Scholz was born in Bridgeport, Connecticut, United States, and graduated from the Central Connecticut State University. In the late 1970s he was nationally ranked in track and field, specializing in the 10-event decathlon. Upon winning the 1979 NCAA Decathlon championships, the Carter Boycott of the 1980 Summer Olympics and a badly pulled hamstring ended his track career in 1980.

== Carving career ==
Scholz inherited some carving tools from his uncle, who had carved decoys, and in 1971 he tried carving birds. One of his first carvings was a red-tailed hawk. He started carving professionally in 1983. At the first carving competition he entered, the 1983 U.S. National Decoy Show, he won best in show in the amateur class. In 1986 he was profiled in People magazine. "Even the best artists seldom attract the kind of attention that has come to Floyd Scholz," wrote Wildfowl Carving and Collecting Magazine in its Spring 1986 issue. "With a clutch of national and world ribbons to show at age 27, he is on his way to an enduring reputation." Scholz has become known for his carvings of raptors such as hawks and eagle. Scholz prefers to carve from tupelo. He uses primarily power tools to carve and burnishing tools to add ripples and dips in the body. He etches each feather with woodburning tools and paints with acrylics. He usually carves the wings of his larger birds as separate pieces. Among the well-known people who own his carvings are musician John Sebastian and the late actress Elizabeth Taylor, actress Glenn Close, businessman David Evans Shaw and Robert Kennedy, Jr. He is a contributing editor to Wildfowl Carving Magazine. In October 2013 the Ward Museum of Wildfowl Art in Salisbury, Maryland, named Scholz as one of its "Living Legends" to be honored at the 2014 Ward World Championship Wildfowl Carving Competition and Art Festival.

== Books and music ==
Scholz's first book was Birds of Prey (Stackpole Books, 1993), a reference guide to 17 hawks, eagles and falcons. He followed that with Carving and Painting the Red-Tailed Hawk (Stackpole Books 1996), Owls (Stackpole Books, 2001), Carving and Painting an American Kestrel (Stackpole Books 2003), and Golden Eagle: A Behind-the-Scenes Look at the Art of Bird Carving (Stackpole Books, 2007). Scholz plays guitar, five-string banjo and harmonica and has belonged to the Manic Mountain Boys since 1980 and the Vermont-based bluegrass band Lincoln Gap from 1996 to 2002. In the early 1990s, Scholz began working with PRS Guitars of Stevensville, Maryland, to create neck inlay patterns for the company's line of Private Stock guitars and he created a line of Golden Eagle Limited guitars.

== Vermont Raptor Academy ==
Scholz is in demand as a teacher and in 1996 he started the Vermont Raptor Academy to offer seminars in the spring, summer and fall at the Bennington Center for the Arts in Bennington, Vermont. The Bennington center also has a gallery devoted exclusively to Scholz's work. He has studios in both Vermont and Florida.
