= New Shabbos Waltz =

Studio album by David Grisman, Andy Statman
- Released: 2006
- Genre: Jazz, klezmer
- Label: Rounder
- Producer: David Grisman

David Grisman, Andy Statman chronology
| Songs of Our Fathers (1995) | New Shabbos Waltz (2006) |

David Grisman chronology
| DGBX (2006) | New Shabbos Waltz (2006) | The Living Room Sessions (2007) |

Professional ratings
Review scores
| Source | Rating |
|---|---|
| Allmusic | 3.5/5 stars |

New Shabbos Waltz is an album by American musicians David Grisman and Andy Statman, released in 2006. It is a follow-up to their 1995 album Songs of Our Fathers and is a tribute to Grisman's and Statman's Jewish heritage. The album contains instrumental recordings from traditional Jewish repertoire, old and new.

== Track listing ==
1. "Avinnu Malkeinu"
2. "Anim Zemiros"
3. "Pischu Li"
4. "Shabbos HaYom LaShem"
5. "Mim'komkha"
6. "New Shabbos Waltz"
7. "Ya'aleh"
8. "Oifen Pripitchik"
9. "Old Klezmer"
10. "Yerusalayim Irkhah"
11. "Yerusalayim Shel Zahav"
12. "Lekha Dodi"
13. "Ani Ma'amin"

== Personnel ==
- David Grisman – mandolin, octave banjo-mandolin, banjoguitar
- Andy Statman – clarinet, mandolin
- Hal Blaine – drums
- Edgar Meyer – bass
- Zachariah Spellman – tuba
- Enrique Coria – guitar
- Bob Brozman – guitar
- Samson Grisman – bass
