= Artie Traum =

American musician (1943–2008)

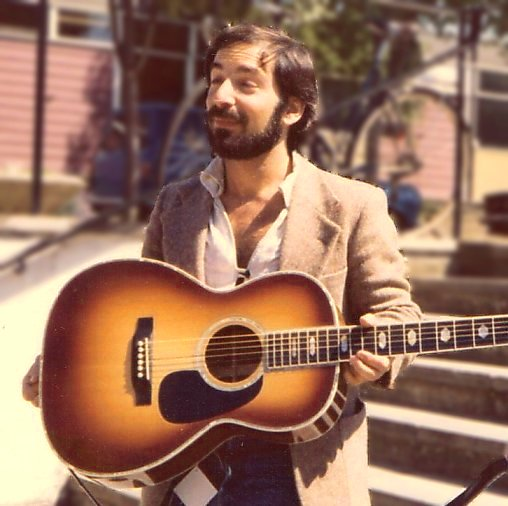
- Artie Traum at the 1978 Norwich Folk Festival, UK

Background information
- Born: Arthur Roy Traum; April 3, 1943; The Bronx, New York, U.S.
- Died: July 20, 2008 (aged 65) Bearsville, New York, U.S.
- Genres: Folk, jazz, pop, rock
- Occupations: Musician, producer
- Instrument: Guitar
- Years active: 1960s–2008

Arthur Roy Traum (April 3, 1943 – July 20, 2008) was an American guitarist, songwriter, and producer. Traum's work appeared on more than 35 albums. He produced and recorded with The Band, Arlen Roth, Warren Bernhardt, Pat Alger, Tony Levin, John Sebastian, Richie Havens, Maria Muldaur, Eric Andersen, Paul Butterfield, Paul Siebel, Rory Block, James Taylor, Pete Seeger, David Grisman, Livingston Taylor, Michael Franks and Happy Traum, among others. Traum's songs were featured on PBS, BBC, ESPN, CBS, and The Weather Channel. He toured in Japan, Europe and the U.S.

== Biography ==
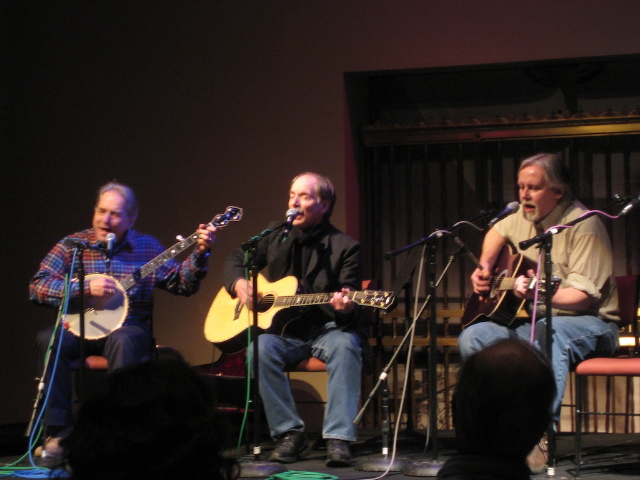
From left: Happy Traum, Artie Traum, and Ed Renehan performing in Albany at The Linda WAMC's Performing Arts Studio on March 26, 2008. Photo by Jane Traum.

Born and raised in the Bronx, Traum became a part of the Greenwich Village folk music scene in the late 1950s. Early on, Traum co-wrote songs for the Brian De Palma debut film Greetings – the first role for Robert De Niro – with Eric Kaz and Bear.

1969 saw Traum joining forces with his brother Happy Traum in a duo. Their self-titled debut album, Happy & Artie Traum (Capitol Records) was cited by the New York Times as "one of the best records in any field of pop music." The Traums were managed by Albert Grossman (manager of The Band, Dylan, Janis Joplin, etc.). The duo performed at the 1969 Newport Folk Festival on stage with James Taylor, Kris Kristofferson and Joni Mitchell.

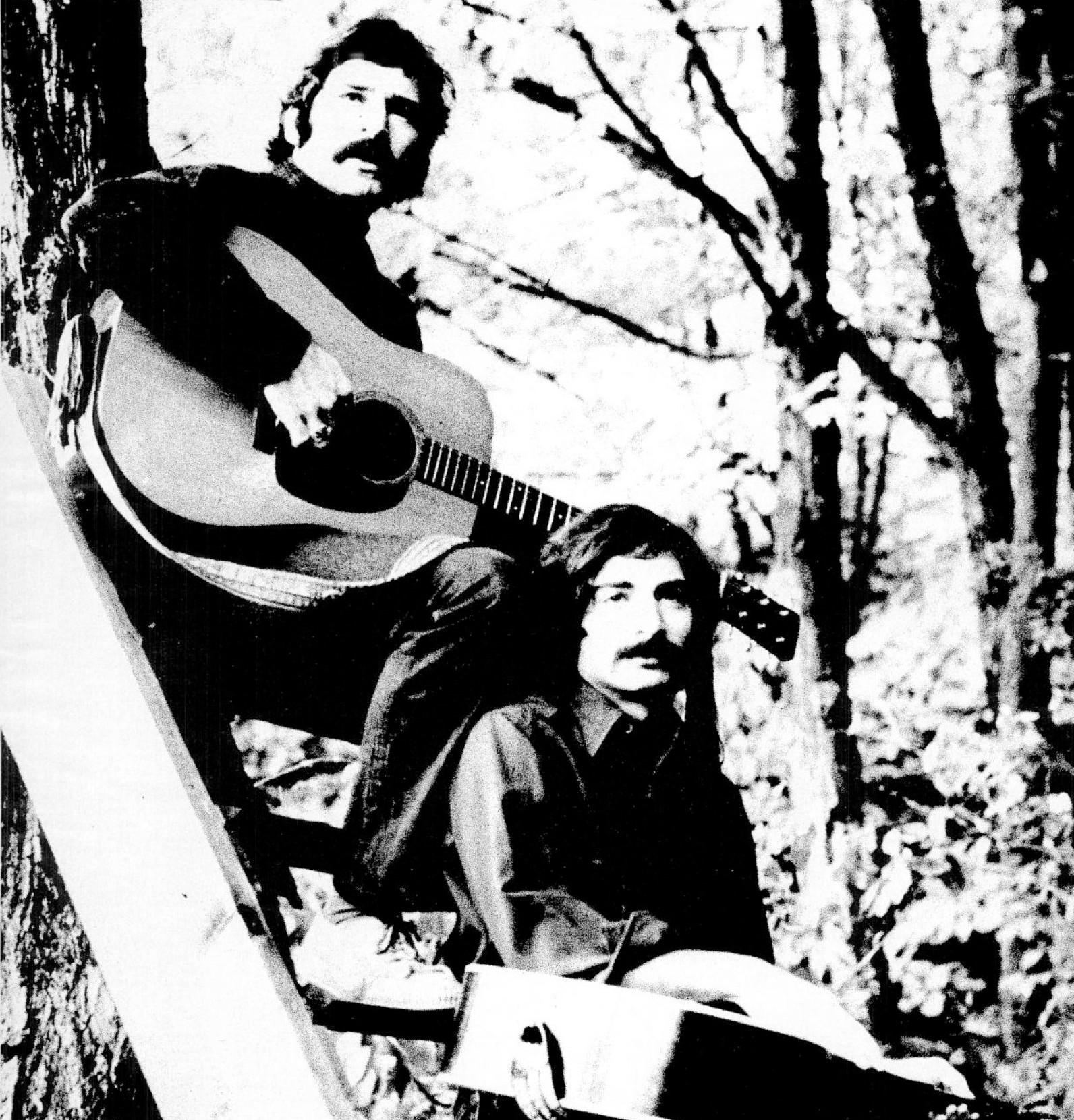
Happy Traum and Artie Traum in 1970.

In November 1971, both Artie and Happy Traum (together with Bob Dylan, David Amram, and others) participated in an extended Record Plant (NYC) session backing up Allen Ginsberg in various songs and chants. Ginsberg wrote the liner notes for the duo's Hard Times in the Country LP. Reviewing the LP in Christgau's Record Guide: Rock Albums of the Seventies (1981), Robert Christgau wrote: "If you're a sucker for folkie nonsense—ramblin' mythopoeia, articulated sentiment, purty tunes—you might as well buy it from real folkies on a real, struggling folkie label. Bonus: 'Gambler's Song,' Artie's uncharacteristically ironic tale of anomie, which ought to be recorded by somebody who'll get it heard."

During the 1970s and 1980s, Artie Traum produced The Woodstock Mountains Revue featuring himself, his brother Happy, Roly Salley Pat Alger, John Sebastian, Arlen Roth, Maria Muldaur, Rory Block, Eric Andersen, Paul Butterfield and Paul Siebel. In the mid-1980s Traum teamed up with singer/songwriter Pat Alger (Thunder Rolls, Unanswered Prayers). The duo recorded the album From The Heart. Traum released his first solo album, Life on Earth, in 1977 on Rounder Records.

Traum's 1994 release – the jazz project Letters From Joubee – captured number one on the Smooth Jazz Radio Charts (Gavin AA chart). In 1999 his Meetings With Remarkable Friends – which included tracks featuring Traum playing with The Band, Bela Fleck, Jay Ungar, and other notables – received the Best Acoustic Instrumental Album award from the NAV.

In 2003, Traum released a singer/songwriter project, South of Lafayette, which was featured on NPR's "All Things Considered". In 2007 Traum released the album Thief of Time.

During recent years, Traum enjoyed a small side career as a documentary filmmaker. In 2002, his film Deep Water: Building the Catskill Water System (co-produced and co-directed with Tobe Carey and Robbie Dupree) was featured at the Woodstock Film Festival. Two years later, in 2004, Traum co-produced Hudson River Journeys: A Celebration of America's First River for WMHT Public Television. The latter film featured artist Len Tantillo and folksinger Pete Seeger.

Traum also wrote numerous guitar instruction books, and hosted many video productions for his brother Happy's Homespun Music Instruction. Traum lived with his wife Beverly in Bearsville, New York, just outside Woodstock. At the time of his death, Traum had been at work on a memoir. Traum died of ocular cancer on July 20, 2008, at Bearsville, aged 65.

== Discography ==
=== Studio albums ===
- 1977: Life On Earth (Rounder)
- 1980: From The Heart (Rounder) with Pat Alger
- 1986: Cayenne (Rounder)
- 1993: Letters From Joubée (Shanachie)
- 1996: The View from Here (Shanachie)
- 1999: Meetings With Remarkable Friends (Narada)
- 2001: More Music For A Stress-Free Day (Hallmark)
- 2001: The Last Romantic: An American Guitar Story (Narada)
- 2002: South of Lafayette (Roaring Stream)
- 2003: Songs About Fishing as Big Trout Radio (with Christopher Shaw and Tom Akstens) (Twining Tree)
- 2004: Acoustic Jazz Guitar (Roaring Stream)
- 2007: Thief Of Time (Roaring Stream)

=== With Happy Traum ===
- 1970: Happy And Artie Traum (Capitol)
- 1971: Double-Back (Capitol)
- 1975: Hard Times In The Country (Rounder)
- 1994: Test of Time (Roaring Stream)

=== As composer ===
- 1968: Bear – Greetings, Children Of Paradise (Verve Forecast) – track 1, "Greetings!" (co-written with Eric Kaz, Michael Soles, and Steve Soles); track 5, "What Difference" (co-written with Marc Silber); track 10, "The Hungry Days Of New Mexico"
- 1972: Buzzy Linhart – Buzzy (Kama Sutra) – track 1, "Tornado"
- 1977: David Grisman Quintet – The David Grisman Quintet (Kaleidoscope) – track 6, "Fish Scale"
- 1977: various artists – Woodstock Mountains: More Music from Mud Acres (Rounder) – track 2, "Cold Front"; track 13, "Barbed Wire"
- 1978: Richard Greene – Duets (Rounder) – track 6, "Fish Scale"
- 1993: The Band – Jericho (Pyramid) – track 8, "Amazon (River Of Dreams)"
- 1995: Tony Rice and John Carlini – River Suite for Two Guitars (Sugar Hill) – track 7, "Fish Scale"
- 1996: The Unherd – Looking for the Light (SongShine) – track 9, "Poison Rain" (co-written with Larry Hoppen)
- 2001: Joe Flood – Cripplin' Crutch (Diesel Only) – track 3, "Niagara" (co-written with Jim Weider and Joe Flood)
- 2003: 4 Way Street – Pretzel Park (Sanctuary) – track 12, "Barbed Wire"
- 2007: Eugene Ruffolo – In a Different Light (Stockfisch) – track 9, "The Hills Of Sicily" (co-written with Eugene Ruffolo)
- 2011: Larry Hoppen – One of the Lucky Ones (Spectra) – track 9, "Poison Rain" (co-written with Larry Hoppen)
- Millpond Moon – Broke In Brooklyn (Tikopia) ' track 1, "Barbed Wire"

=== As producer ===
- 1976: Tom Akstens – Original & Traditional Music (Takoma)
- 1977: various artists – Woodstock Mountains: More Music from Mud Acres (Rounder)
- 1978: Arlen Roth – Guitarist (Rounder)
- 1981: Woodstock Mountain Revue – Back to Mud Acres (Rounder)
- 1983: Priscilla Herdman – Seasons of Change (Flying Fish) – assistant producer, arranger
- 1987: Arlen Roth – Arlen Roth (Rounder)
- 1988: Anne Hills – Woman Of A Calm Heart (Flying Fish)
- 1988: Livingston Taylor – Life Is Good (Critique)
- 1990: Amy & Leslie – Amy & Leslie (Alcazar)
- 1991: Livingston Taylor – Our Turn To Dance (Vanguard)
- 1995: Diane Zeigler – Sting of the Honeybee (Decca / Philo)
- 1999: Alex de Grassi – Bolivian Blues Bar (Narada Jazz)
- 1999: Don Ross – Passion Session (Narada)
- 1999: Laurence Juber – Altered Reality (Narada)
- 1999: Mikhail Horowitz – The Blues Of the Birth (Euphoria Jazz)
- 2000: Tony Levin – Waters of Eden (Narada)
- 2005: Happy Traum, I Walk the Road Again (Roaring Stream)

=== Also appears on ===
==== 1963 – 1979 ====
- 1963: The True Endeavor Jug Band – The Art Of The Jug Band (Prestige Folklore) – banjo, guitar, kazoo, vocals
- 1965: Judy Roderick – Woman Blue (Vanguard) – guitar
- 1968: David Santo – Silver Currents (Phoenix Records Of New York) – guitar
- 1969: Fat City – Reincarnation (Probe) – guitar
- 1970: Kathy Smith – Some Songs I've Saved (Fallout) – banjo, guitar
- 1970: Happy Traum – Bright Morning Stars (Greenhays) – vocals
- 1972: Mud Acres – Music Among Friends (Rounder) – guitar, bass, vocals
- 1975: Rab Noakes – Never Too Late (Warner Bros.) – guitar
- 1976: Harry Tuft – Across The Blue Mountains (Folk-Legacy) – guitar
- 1976: Rory Block – I'm in Love (Blue Goose) – guitar
- 1978: Happy Traum – American Stranger (Kicking Mule) – guitar
- 1978: Woodstock Mountains Revue – Pretty Lucky (Rounder) – guitar, vocals

==== 1980 – present ====
- 1987: Priscilla Herdman – Darkness into Light (Flying Fish) – guitar
- 1988: Rachel Faro – Windsong (Blue Flame) – guitar
- 1988: Priscilla Herdman – Stardreamer: Nightsongs & Lullabies (Alacazam / Alcazar)
- 1988: Christopher Shaw – Adirondack (Hudson River) – guitar
- 1993: Bridget Ball – Bricks and Windows (Hudson River) – guitar
- 1993: Priscilla Herdman – Daydreamer
- 1993: Allen Power – The Healing Arts (Beacon) – guitar
- 1994: Amy & Leslie – Take Me Home (Shanachie) – guitar
- 1994: Happy Train: Test of Time (Roaring Steam) – guitar
- 1995: Priscilla Herdman – Forever & Always (Flying Fish) – guitar, arranger
- 1996: Rory Block – Turning Point (Munich) – vocals
- 2000: Eric Andersen – You Can't Relive the Past (Appleseed) – guitar
- 2003: Priscilla Herdman – The Road Home (Redwing) – guitar
- 2004: Cindy Cashdollar – Slide Show (Silver Shot) – guitar on track 12, "Locust Grove"
- 2004: Priscilla Herdman – Stardreamer (Stardreamer Music) – guitar
- 2009: BeauSoleil avec Michael Doucet – Alligator Purse (Yep Roc) – vocals
