= Dawg's Groove =

Live album by David Grisman Quintet
- Released: 2006
- Genre: Americana, newgrass, jazz, Latin music
- Label: Acoustic Disc
- Producer: David Grisman

David Grisman chronology
Been All Around This World (2004)	Dawg's Groove (2006)	DGBX (2006)

David Grisman Quintet chronology
Dawgnation (2002)	Dawg's Groove (2006)

Professional ratings
Review scores
Source	Rating
Allmusic	4.5/5 stars

Dawg's Groove is a 2006 album by American musician David Grisman, recorded with his group David Grisman Quintet and so far their latest effort. This release is the first one recorded without violin, as Joe Craven left to pursue his own music. His percussion tasks were taken over by George Marsh. Also, this album would be the last one for Enrique Coria, long-time guitarist for David Grisman Quintet.

== Track listing ==
All compositions by David Grisman unless otherwise noted.

1. Limestones (Grisman)
2. La Grande Guignole (Grisman)
3. Ella McDonnell (Kerwin)
4. Waltz for Lucy (Marsh)
5. Zambola (Grisman)
6. Tracy's Tune (Grisman)
7. Dawg's Groove (Bigelow)
8. Cinderella's Fella (Grisman)
9. My Friend Dawg (Eakle)
10. Blues for Vassar (Grisman)
11. (Hidden track)

== Personnel ==
- David Grisman – mandolin, mandola
- George Marsh – drums, percussion
- Matt Eakle – flute, bass flute, tin whistle
- Enrique Coria - guitar, whistle
- Jim Kerwin – bass
