= French Louie =

Adirondack guide, trapper, and woodsman

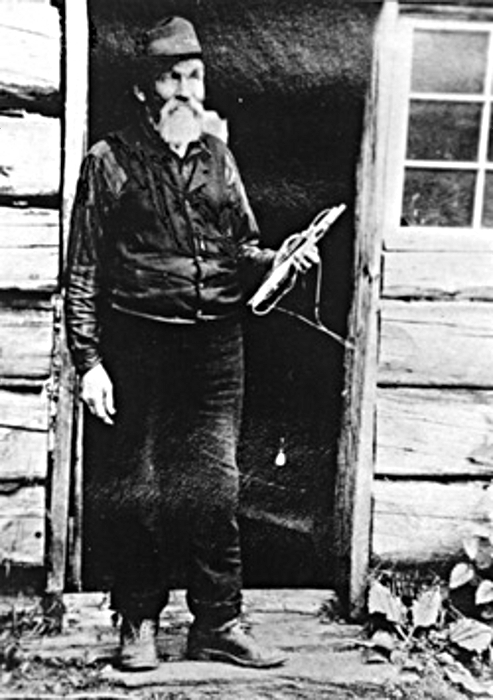
Adirondack French Louie

Louis Seymour, known as "French Louie" or "Adirondack French Louie" (c. 1832 – February 28, 1915) was an Adirondack guide, trapper, woodsman and hermit. His age was unknown, but his death certificate said he was 84. He was born near Ottawa, Canada, sometime around 1832. French Louie is mentioned in virtually every book written about the south-central Adirondacks. A lot of what is known of him is from the oral tradition, but Harvey Dunham wrote a biography in 1953.

== Early life ==
Louis Seymour was born on a small farm near Dog River north of Ottawa. As a young boy he was able to do the work of a man, removing stumps, clearing brush etc. It's not known how many brothers and sisters he had, but Harvey L. Dunham described it as "many". After his mother's death, his stepmother was mean to him. He ran away from home and joined a circus. Louie crossed into the United States and joined another circus, and after an undetermined amount of time, at the age of twelve, he took a job on the Erie Canal as a driver, for $8 per month. During the many hours walking behind the mules, he would daydream about living in the woods, and how to set trap lines.

== Arrival in the Adirondacks ==
Louie went back once to Canada and found his family had separated, and he never made another trip north. For the next 20 years, until after the American Civil War, he worked on the canal and with circuses. During the winter, when the canals were closed and the circuses were in winter quarters, he would go into the woods as a lumberjack, mastering the dangerous river driving and clean chopping. During the circus season of 1868, while working in a circus in Saratoga Springs, he heard from a crew of lumberjacks about the great country to the north. Soon Louie was northbound on the Sackets Harbor & Saratoga Railroad, which was then under construction. Plans were for the railroad to cross the entire Adirondacks region, past Blue Mountain Lake and Raquette Lake, through the Moose River and Beaver River country, and on through Carthage to Sackets Harbor on Lake Ontario. The plan was also to log some 500,000 acres (2,000 km^{2}) of timber land. At Thurman Station, Louie got on a stage for Warrensburg, where he caught a stage for Indian Lake.

Louie had a real fondness and longing for the "bush". A man sent Louie down a road to the south to Lewey Lake to get a job. George Griffin was a big lumberman with thirteen camps in the area around Lewey Lake and Indian Lake. Griffin hired Louie on as a blacksmith's helper. Before long Louie was sent into the woods as a chopper. At that time, crosscut saws were rare and had to be imported from England, and few knew how to sharpen one. Among the loggers in the Adirondacks, there was a debate about which was better, sawing or chopping. The reason for the debate was because the flat ends of the sawed logs would split when they would hit rocks and boulders in the rivers on the way to the sawmill. Chopping produced a tapered end on the log.

In 1871 Louie bought a yoke of oxen to work a small lumber job for Griffin. Two years later he hauled a load of hides with his oxen through the town of Newton Corners to the tannery for a man named Dave Sturgis. Between 1871 and 1873 Louie worked in the lumber woods for Jim MacCormack and John McGinn, and drove logs on the Jessup River for Dave Sturgis.

== Louie Seymore, trapper ==
In 1873 Louie gave up following the lumber jobs, and built his first enclosed camp on Lewey Lake. There he lived and trapped, and sold his furs at Indian Lake village through Oliver Ste. Marie. Louie had no steel traps, but used snares and deadfalls. Oliver sent the furs to Prouty in New York City, who paid the best for furs. It might be a year or two before Louie saw the checks to be cashed. During that winter Louie captured two deer, built a pen and fed them shin hemlock. Later the deer were sold to the owner of a park in Saratoga. On the opposite side of Lewey Lake another French Canadian named Sam Seymore lived in a cabin. Sam was also a woodsman hermit and trapper but did not long for the deep woods. Sam believed that Louie and he must be brothers because they both came from Dog River, they both said their family broke up in Canada, and had the same story of a hard stepmother. Louie said he had many brothers and sisters, but didn't remember one named Sam. Sam always believed they were brothers, and Louie wasn't so sure. Sam died in the summer following Louie's death in 1915.

Louie kept chickens and had a productive garden. He attributed the success of his garden to the many snakes of the area. He had a couple of hound dogs, and when he was going into town he would kill a deer, skin it out, and leave it with the dogs, along with a large volume of water. Louie gained the respect of many by his ability to live in the wilderness and be totally self-sufficient.

It became too civilized for Louie at Lewey Lake, and he moved on to the Jessup River, where he built another cabin and stayed there for one winter. From there he built a camp in a clearing on the Indian Lake-Newton Corners road. Next he built a cabin at Cedar Lakes. Trapping took him to Pillsbury Lake, where he built two lean-tos facing each other. Louie left his pack and gun with Dave Sturgis and went to a circus with some lumberjacks, and did not return with them. When he again headed back to the wilderness, he ended up in the vicinity of Moosehead Lake in Maine. He was not there long because he killed a moose out of season and got away on a river log drive. He said he left no tracks getting out of the state of Maine. This time he settled not at Cedar Lakes, but nearer to Newton Corners. He did odd jobs, and cleared several acres of timber for Dave Sturgis.

Twice yearly, Louie would return to Speculator with his winter haul of furs and pelts on a narrow hand sled of his own making. Arriving on the top of Page Hill, he would emit a series of wild animal cries and howls that would signal to the children of the town that he had arrived once more. They would come running to him and he would never be shy about buying them candy or giving out nickels and dimes. When children asked him to show off his animal cries or mimic an owl, he would always oblige.

== Death ==
In the winter of 1915, Louie became ill with what was then called Bright's disease. He hiked to his camp at Pillsbury and stayed overnight where he then trekked to the main road and walked to Speculator. Arriving at the Brook's Motel, he paid for his room with a trout he had caught and gave it to Nora Brooks, the wife of the owner. The evening of February 27, 1915, he fell deathly ill as Ernie and Nora Brooks sent for a doctor. He was pronounced dead early the next morning. Because of his lifestyle, Louie never had much money, so paying for a burial was very difficult. The townspeople of Lake Pleasant and Arietta chipped in and helped give Louie the proper burial he deserved. Ernie Brooks paid for the burial permit as Mead Sturges and Nathan Slack dug the burial site. The town of Arietta agreed to pay half of the $150 burial fee, while the other half was paid by the town of Lake Pleasant. The schoolhouse was closed as students attended the funeral of French Louie at the Speculator Methodist church. The funeral was preached by Rev. L.W. Ward. Before the casket was closed, children walked up to it and laid fresh green balsam on his body. As the procession made its way to the cemetery, they held balsam boughs as they walked. Louie was buried in the Speculator cemetery in an unmarked grave until 1945, when a group who was fascinated by his story erected a tombstone that read, "French Louie" "Louis Seymour, died February 28, 1915 aged about 85 years. Erected 1954 by admirers."
