= Hold On, We're Strummin' =

Studio album by David Grisman, Sam Bush
- Released: 2003
- Genre: Bluegrass music
- Label: Acoustic Disc
- Producer: The Rhythm Twins (David Grisman, Sam Bush)

David Grisman chronology
| Life of Sorrow (2003) | Hold On, We're Strummin' (2003) | Been All Around This World (2004) |

Professional ratings
Review scores
| Source | Rating |
|---|---|
| Allmusic | 3.5/5 stars |
| The Music Box | 4/5 stars |

Hold On, We're Strummin' is an album by American musicians David Grisman and Sam Bush. It features Grisman and Bush on a number of different instruments. They are accompanied by Sam Grisman, members of the David Grisman Quintet, and other guests.

== Track listing ==
All compositions by David Grisman and Sam Bush, unless otherwise noted.

1. Hartford's Real 6:03
2. Swamp Thing 4:58
3. Intimo 5:53
4. Jamgrass 741 6:29
5. Sea Breeze 7:50
6. Old Time Medley (trad.) 3:43
7. Weeping Mandolin Waltz 5:31
8. Arachnid Stomp 1:35
9. Crusher and Hoss 3:00
10. The Old South 2:50
11. Mando Space 1:32
12. Ralph's Banjo Special (Stanley) 3:06
13. 'Cept Old Bill (Burns) 2:41
14. Rhythm Twins 0:34
15. Dan'l Boone (Grisman) 4:05
16. Hold On, I'm Comin'' (Hayes, Porter) 10:32

== Personnel ==
- David Grisman – mandolin, mandocello, octave mandola, mandola, banjo–mandolin, banjo
- Sam Bush – mandolin, violin, octave mandola, mandocello, banjo, bass guitar, national mandolin
- Enrique Coria – guitar
- Dimitri Vandellos – guitar
- Jim Kerwin – bass
- Jack Lawrence – guitar
- Jim Nunally – guitar
- Hal Blaine – drums
- Sam Grisman – bass
