= Been All Around This World =

Studio album by Jerry Garcia and David Grisman
- Released: April 6, 2004
- Genre: Progressive bluegrass, new acoustic
- Label: Acoustic Disc
- Producer: David Grisman

Jerry Garcia and David Grisman chronology
Grateful Dawg (2001)	Been All Around This World (2004)

Jerry Garcia chronology
Grateful Dawg (2001)	Been All Around This World (2004)	All Good Things: Jerry Garcia Studio Sessions (2004)

David Grisman chronology
Hold On, We're Strummin' (2003)	Been All Around This World (2004)	Dawg's Groove (2006)

Professional ratings
Review scores
Source	Rating
Allmusic	4.5/5 stars
The Music Box	3.5/5 stars

Been All Around This World is an album of acoustic collaboration between Jerry Garcia and David Grisman, released in 2004.

== Track listing ==
1. "Been All Around this World" (Traditional)
2. "I'll Go Crazy" (James Brown)
3. "Take Me" (George Jones/Leon Payne)
4. "Handsome Cabin Boy Waltz" (Traditional)
5. "The Ballad of Frankie Lee and Judas Priest" (Bob Dylan)
6. "I'm Troubled" (Traditional)
7. "Blue Yodel #9" (Jimmie Rodgers)
8. "Nine Pound Hammer" (Merle Travis)
9. "I Ain't Never" (Michael Pierce/Mel Tillis)
10. "Sittin' Here in Limbo" (Plummer Bright/James Chambers)
11. "Dark as a Dungeon" (Merle Travis)
12. "Drink up and go Home" (Freddie Hart)

== Personnel ==
- David Grisman – mandolin
- Jerry Garcia – guitar, vocals
- Joe Craven – violin, percussion, vocals
- Matt Eakle – flute
- John Kahn – bass
- Jim Kerwin – bass
- George Marsh – drums
- Sally Van Meter – Dobro
