= Nunnally =

Nunnally may refer to a surname or a given name:

== Surname ==
- James Nunnally (born 1990), American basketball for Maccabi Tel Aviv of the Israeli Basketball Premier League and the Euroleague
- Jon Nunnally (born 1971), American professional baseball player
- Tiina Nunnally (born 1952), American author and translator

== Given name ==
- Nunnally Johnson (1897–1977), American filmmaker
- Nunnally Lamperouge, fictional character from the anime Code Geass

== See also ==
- Jim Nunally, American bluegrass guitarist
- Nunneley
- Nunnely
