= Old Songs Festival =

Old Songs Festival of Traditional Music and Dance: Music with Roots
- Genre: Folk, World, Celtic
- Dates: last full weekend in June
- Locations: Altamont, New York, United States
- Coordinates: 42.698664°N 74.026399°W
- Years active: 1981–present
- Website: Official website

The Old Songs Festival is an American annual folk music festival and dance festival held at Altamont Fairgrounds in Altamont, New York.

== History ==
In 1981, the first Old Songs Festival was held at Tawasentha Park in Guilderland, New York. It grew out of the Fox Hollow Festival and after the first year, has been continuously held at the Altamont Fairgrounds since 1982.

== Current logistics ==
Old Songs Festival of Traditional Music and Dance: Music with Roots is held the last full weekend of June, Friday through Sunday; camping is permitted on the grounds with an All-Festival Camping ticket, additionally there are all-festival tickets (no camping) as well as single-day tickets available.

== Performers and stages ==
Old Songs is a family-friendly festival of folk, traditional, Celtic and World music and dance, known for its relaxed atmosphere, interactive sessions and workshops, hands-on experience and participatory nature. In addition to three concerts there are 120 daytime workshops given by performers. Also featured are a juried craft show, food and instrument vendors, and a well-run children’s activity area.
