= Nunneley =

Nunneley is a surname. Notable people with the surname include:

- James S. Nunneley (1910–1967), American politician
- John Nunneley (1922–2013), British Army officer and businessman
- Kathleen Nunneley (1872–1956), New Zealand tennis player and librarian

== See also ==
- Nunnely
- Nunnally
- Nunnelee
