= Beppe Gambetta =

Italian guitarist and singer (born 1955)

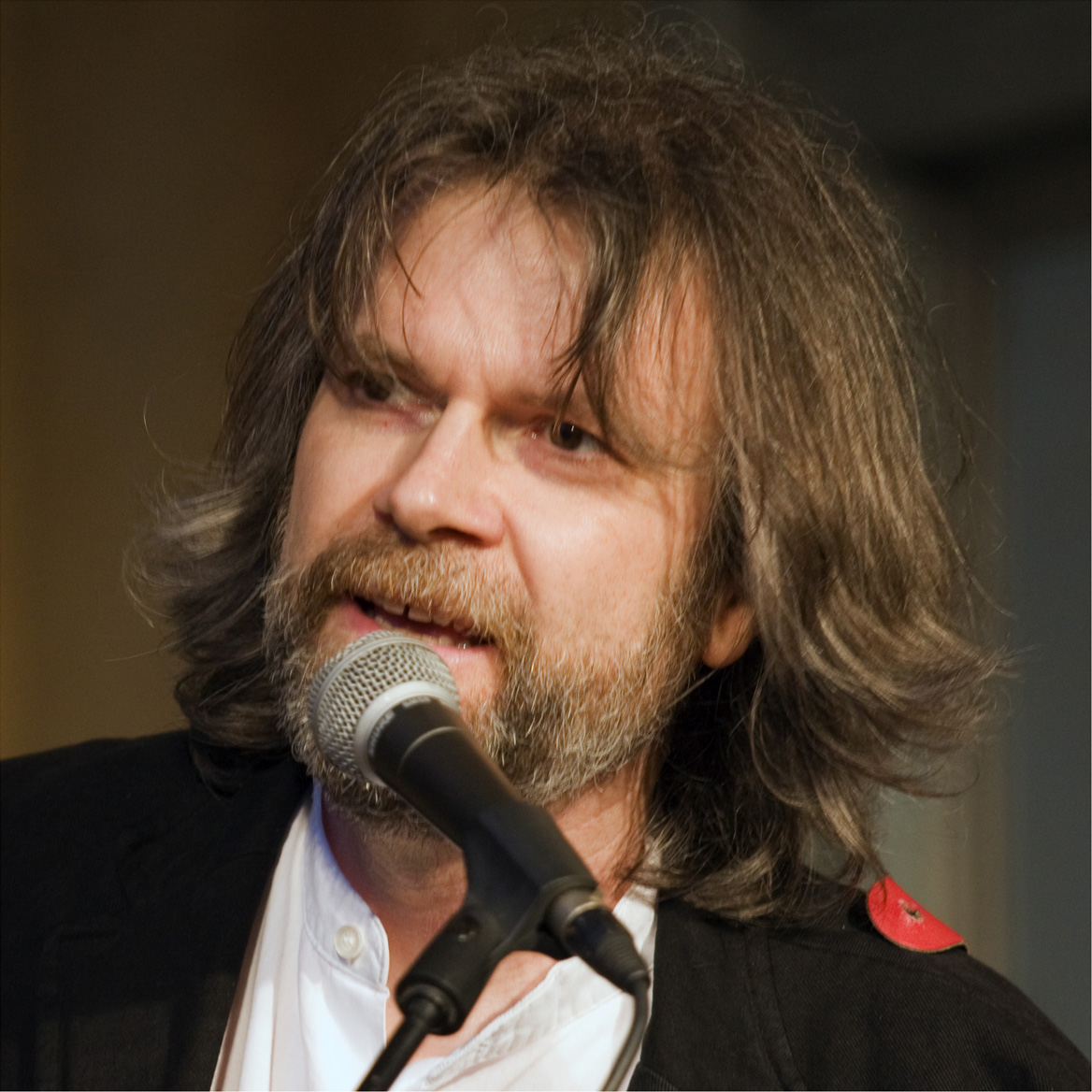
- Performing live in 2008

Background information
- Born: 1955 (age 69–70); Genoa, Italy
- Genres: Folk, bluegrass, Italian folk
- Occupation(s): Musician, singer, author
- Instrument(s): Guitar, harp guitar, vocals
- Years active: 1989–present
- Labels: Gadfly
- Website: www.beppegambetta.com

Beppe Gambetta (born 1955) is an Italian acoustic guitarist and singer. A native of Genoa, he is a composer, teacher, author, and researcher of traditional music and instruments.

== Music career ==
In 1977, Gambetta founded Red Wine, an Italian bluegrass band. He wrote the first Italian instructional book on flatpicking. His flatpicking style is similar to Doc Watson's and Moravian folk music. This style is characterized by flashy licks, intricate cross-picking patterns, open tunings, and fluid slides up and down the neck of the guitar.

Although Beppe lives in Genoa, he travels throughout North America every year. He has performed in the Walnut Valley Festival in Winfield, Kansas, MerleFest in North Carolina, the Kerrville Folk Festival in Texas and festivals in Winnipeg and Edmonton. He has appeared on the radio programs All Things Considered and eTown.

Beppe has performed with David Grisman, Gene Parsons, Doc Watson, Norman Blake and the band Men of Steel, which comprises Dan Crary, Tony McManus, and Don Ross. He toured with banjo player Tony Trischka and released the accompanying live album Alone and Together. In 2015, Gambetta embarked on a brief tour with cellist Rushad Eggleston.

Gambetta recorded the album Traversata: Italian Music in America (Acoustic Disc, 2001) with mandolinist David Grisman and mandolinist Carlo Aonzo. On the album, he used a 14-string harp guitar custom made for him by Italian luthier Antonello Saccu.

== Reception ==
Beppe has been called a "virtual United Nations of influences: Italian, Ukrainian, Appalachian, Sardinian, Celtic".

He has been described by The Huffington Post as one of the "best flatpickers anywhere."

== Discography ==
- Dialogs (Hi, Folks!, 1988)
- Alone & Together with Tony Trischka (Brambus, 1991)
- Good News from Home (Green Linnet, 1995)
- Serenata (Acoustic Music, 1997)
- Synergia (Felmay, 2001)
- Traversata (Acoustic Disc, 2001)
- Blu Di Genova (Felmay, 2002)
- Slade Stomp (Gadfly, 2006)
- Rendez-vous (Gadfly, 2008)
- Live at Teatro Della Corte (Gadfly, 2010)
- The American Album (Gadfly, 2013)
- Round Trip (Borealis, 2015)
- Short Stories (Borealis, 2017)
- Where The Wind Blows (Borealis, 2020)
- Terra Madre (Egea Music, 2024)
