= Judy Roderick =

American folk and blues singer-songwriter (1942–1992)

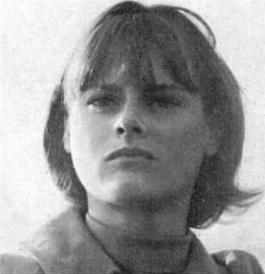
- Judy Roderick in 1966

Background information
- Born: Judith Allen Roderick; December 14, 1942; Wyandotte, Michigan, U.S.
- Died: January 22, 1992 (aged 49) Ravalli, Montana, U.S.
- Genres: Folk, blues, country
- Occupations: Singer, songwriter, guitarist
- Years active: Early 1960s–1980s
- Website: judyroderick.com

Judith Allen Roderick (December 14, 1942 – January 22, 1992) was an American folk and blues singer and songwriter, described by AllMusic as: "One of the finest white folk/blues singers of the early to mid-'60s."

== Biography ==
She was born in Wyandotte, Michigan to Howard and Emily Roderick, and grew up in Elkhart, Indiana. She attended the University of Colorado in Boulder, and began singing blues, folk and country music and playing guitar in clubs there and in Denver.

After moving to New York City in the early 1960s, she was heard by manager Lee Silberstein, who secured her a record deal with Columbia Records. Her first album, Ain't Nothin' But The Blues, produced by Bobby Scott, was released in 1964. Described at Allmusic as "an eclectic mix of traditional acoustic folk tunes and large arrangements of blues tunes", it featured John Hammond Jr. on harmonica. She performed at the 1964 Newport Folk Festival, and at many leading club venues in the eastern United States, developing a loyal following, but a second album for Columbia was never completed after Roderick and Scott disagreed on the direction it should take.

She was signed for Vanguard Records by Maynard Solomon, and recorded her second and best-regarded album, Woman Blue, released in 1965. Again a mixture of blues and folk material, from a variety of sources, it featured musicians Artie Traum, Dick Weissman, Russ Savakus, Todd Sommer and Paul Griffin. The song "Woman Blue" was a folk song recorded by many artists, usually titled "I Know You Rider", and made more popular later by the Grateful Dead. The album was issued by Fontana in the UK in 1966, and Roderick went to Britain to promote the record. She was also featured on an album of Newport Folk Festival performances issued by Vanguard. However, by the time of the Vanguard releases, her style of music was being overtaken by the emergence of folk rock, and sales of her records were disappointing.

She began writing songs in collaboration with Bill Ashford, and returned to Colorado in 1969, forming a new band, 60,000,000 Buffalo. Their album of original material, Nevada Jukebox, produced by Bill Szymczyk, was released on the Atco label in 1972. However, the band broke up the following year.

Roderick moved to Hamilton, Montana, where she continued to perform, often with partner Dexter Payne in his swing band, The Big Sky Mudflaps; she sang some of the songs on two of the band's albums. In 1982, she and Payne formed a new band, Judy Roderick & The Forbears, and recorded a self-titled album with musicians including Mac Rebennack (Dr. John). The album received a limited independent release on cassette only in 1984.

A diabetic since childhood, Judy Roderick died of a heart attack from complications due to the disease in 1992 at the age of 49.

== Legacy ==
The album Woman Blue was remastered and reissued by Vanguard in 1993. One of Roderick and Ashford's songs, "Floods of South Dakota", was later recorded by Tim and Mollie O'Brien; their performance was nominated for a Grammy. The cassette album Judy Roderick & The Forbears was remastered for digital release and issued on CD by Dexofon Records, in 2008.

== Discography ==
- Ain't Nothin' but the Blues (Columbia, 1964)
- Woman Blue (Vanguard, 1965)
- Nevada Jukebox (with 60,000,000 Buffalo, Atco, 1972)
- Judy Roderick & The Forbears (Raw Deal, 1984)
