= James H. Nunnelee =

American politician

James Howell Nunnelee

Member of the Alabama Senate from the Dallas County district
- In office 1899–1901
- Governor: William J. Samford; William D. Jelks

Recording Secretary to the Governor of Alabama
- In office 1907–1915
- Governor: B. B. Comer; Emmet O'Neal

Personal details
- Born: January 26, 1858 Eutaw, Alabama, U.S.
- Died: 1921 (aged 62–63)
- Party: Democratic
- Spouse: Emma Leonard
- Occupation: Newspaper publisher, politician

James Howell Nunnelee (January 26, 1858 – 1921) was a newspaper publisher and state senator in Alabama representing Dallas County, Alabama from 1899 to 1901. He was a Democrat.

He was born in Eutaw, Alabama and lived in Selma, Alabama. His father and brother were also in the newspaper business. He married Emma Leonard. He also served as recording secretary to governors B. B. Comer and Emmet O'Neal.
