= Jim Nunally =

American musician

James E. “Jim” Nunally is an American musician that plays bluegrass-style, flat pick guitar with John Reischman and the Jaybirds, and with The David Grisman Bluegrass Experience. Jim has received two Grammy award certifications and two IBMA awards for his performance on the 1996 Bluegrass Album of the Year True Life Blues: The Songs of Bill Monroe.

== Career ==
Nunally is a San Francisco Bay Area-native. He is a musician, composer, record producer, and teacher. His third-generation traditional music roots started in Arkansas with his grandfather who taught Jim's father how to play guitar, who eventually taught Jim how to play.

Jim recorded Snoopy's guitar tracks for the Peanuts animated television special Snoopy's Reunion in 1991 and he was also the guitarist on the theme song of The Beverly Hillbillies movie. Jim received two Grammy award certifications and two IBMA awards for his performance on the 1996 Bluegrass Album of the Year True Life Blues: The Songs of Bill Monroe. He recorded with David Grisman and Sam Bush on the much anticipated album Hold On, We're Strummin which was nominated for two IBMA awards. Jim is a two-time Western Open Flatpicking and Master Picking Champion.

=== 2003 ===
Bluegrass group Due West featured Nunally, Bill Evans (banjo), Erik Thomas (mandolin), and Chad Manning (fiddle). Their one album is These Boots released in 2003.

=== 2005 ===
In 2005 Jim appeared with John Reischman on the Acoustic Disc release which was produced by David Grisman. The disc was titled Tone Poets.

=== Performances ===
He has performed with:

- John Reischman and the Jaybirds
- The David Grisman Bluegrass Experience
- Due West
- Nell Robinson
- Dix Bruce
- Keith Little

== Discography ==
=== Solo albums ===
- 2007: Gloria's Waltz (FGM)
- 2013: House & Garden (Nell Robinson Music) with Nell Robinson
- 2017: Baby Lets Take the Long Way Home (Whippoorwill) with Nell Robinson

=== With The David Grisman Bluegrass Experience ===
- 2006: DGBX (Acoustic Disc)

=== With John Reischman and the Jaybirds ===
- 2011: Vintage & Unique (Corvus)

=== As producer ===
- 2010: Trisha Gagnon - A Story About You and Me (Tumbleweed)

=== Also appears on ===
- 1990: Due West with Rob Ickes, Greg Spatz, Erik Thomas, Steve Carlson, Robert Bowden
- 1996: Kathy Kallick - Call Me a Taxi (Sugar Hill)
- 1996: True Life Blues: The Songs Of Bill Monroe - Producer Todd Phillips (Sugar Hill)
- 1997: Darol Anger - Heritage (Six Degrees)
- 1999: Linda Allen - The Long Way Home (October Rose)
- 2001: Kathy Kallick - My Mother's Voice (Copper Creek)
- 2002: Craig Korth - Bankview (Sadiebird)
- 2003: Sam Bush and David Grisman - Hold On, We're Strummin' (Acoustic Disc)
- 2003: Kathy Kallick - Reason & Rhyme (Copper Creek)
- 2004: Alice Gerrard - Calling Me Home: Songs of Love and Loss (Copper Creek)
- 2005: The Stairwell Sisters - Feet All Over the Floor (Yodel-Ay-Hee)
- 2011: Nell Robinson - On The Brooklyn Road (Nell Robinson Music)
- 2013: Fletcher Bright and Bill Evans - Fine Times at Fletcher's House (Native and Fine)
- 2014: Nell Robinson - The Rose of No-Man's Land (Compass)
