= Fox Hollow Festival =

The Fox Hollow Festival or Fox Hollow Festival of Traditional Music and Arts was a folk festival held on the estate of folksingers Bob and Evelyne Beers in Petersburgh, New York each summer from 1966 to 1980, usually in August.
