= Nunnely =

Nunnely is a surname. Notable people with the surname include:

- Ché Nunnely (born 1999), Dutch footballer
- Wayne Nunnely (1952–2021), American football player and coach

== See also ==
- Nunneley
- Nunnally
