= David Evans Shaw =

American entrepreneur and social investor

- Born: April 22, 1951 (age 75); Nashua, New Hampshire, U.S.
- Occupations: Entrepreneur, investor, author, film producer, conservationist
- Spouse: Marjorie Babine (m. 1973; div.1998) Glenn Close (m. 2006; div. 2015)
- Awards: International SeaKeeper of the Year, Maine Creative Industry Award, Leslie Cheek Medal

David Evans Shaw (born April 22, 1951) is an American technology and social entrepreneur and film producer. He founded the Sargasso Sea Alliance. He is recognized for founding and leading a number of science-based companies, as well as for his involvement in public service, conservation, and the arts.

== Early life and education ==
Shaw was born in Nashua, New Hampshire, and spent much of his early life in New Hampshire. He graduated from the University of New Hampshire in 1973 and earned his MBA from the University of Maine in 1976. He is the son of Frederic E. Shaw and Muriel Evans Shaw.

He has received honorary doctorates from Colby College, Bates College, Maine College of Art, the University of New England, and the University of Southern Maine.

== Business career ==
Shaw is the founder and former CEO of IDEXX Laboratories. He co-founded Vets First Choice, which later merged to form Covetrus, a global animal-health technology and services company. He is also the founder and CEO of Black Point Group, an investment partnership focused on science-based companies and public service initiatives.

He has held leadership and board roles at companies including the Jackson Laboratory, Ikaria Pharmaceuticals, Ironwood Pharmaceuticals, Modern Meadow, Waterbear, Cyteir, and Fetchdog.com (which he co-founded with then-wife, actress Glenn Close).

== Conservation activities and activism ==
Shaw was named a member of Ocean Elders and a Patron of Nature for the International Union for the Conservation of Nature. He founded Second Century Stewardship, supporting science and stewardship in America's national parks.

He has served as a board member, advisor and partner to the National Park Foundation, Hurricane Island Outward Bound, Discovery Communications, Just Capital, Arctaris, Sustainable Harvest International, Telluride Science and Research Center, Saildrone, San Diego Zoo Wildlife Alliance, and the Future of Cities Project.

== Public service and academia ==
Shaw served as treasurer (2010–2017), trustee, and Fellow of the American Association for the Advancement of Science (AAAS). He has been a trustee of the National Park Foundation since 2012 and was a presidential appointee overseeing the centennial celebrations of the Parks in 2016.

From 1994 to 1997 Shaw was a presidential appointee to the Executive Committee of the US-Israel Science and Technology Commission and has served on the board of the Jackson Laboratory since 1989, chairing it since 1997. Shaw was also a member of the advisory board for the Center for Public Leadership at Harvard Kennedy School (2003–2012), and is a founding director of the U.S. Olympic & Paralympic Museum.

== Public health and education ==
In 2022, Shaw collaborated with actress Goldie Hawn to provide mental health resources for schools in Maine. He has served on the boards of Visby Medical and Maine Medical Center.

== Films, books, and the arts ==
Shaw was executive producer of the 2011 film Albert Nobbs, which earned Glenn Close an Oscar nomination. Shaw is the author of the 2024 book Wave Making.

Shaw founded the David E. Shaw & Family Sculpture Park at the Portland Museum of Art.

== Personal life ==
Shaw was married to Marjorie Babine, separating in 1998. He married actress Glenn Close in 2006 until their separation in 2015. He resides in Maine.
