= Sackets Harbor and Saratoga Railroad Company =

Railroad in New York

Sackets Harbor and Saratoga Railroad Company is a predecessor railroad to the Delaware and Hudson Railway's Tahawus Branch. It was not completed, although 60 miles (97 km) of it was eventually built (as required by its charter) from Saratoga Springs to North Creek. It was chartered in 1848, incorporated 1852 and surveyed in 1853. Approximately 20 miles (32 km) of disconnected grade was built in 1854. The railroad was then reorganized as the Lake Ontario & Hudson River Railroad. When the charter requirements were completed in 1871, the company was granted ownership of some 800,000 acres (3,200 km^{2}) of Adirondack woodland. In 1902, the Board of Railroad Commissioners relieved the railroad (now owned by the D&H) of its obligation to build the railroad beyond North Creek, effectively extinguishing the concept of the SH&S.

Portions of the unfinished railbed may be found in Lewis County, and Warren County.
