= Happy Traum =

American folk musician (1938–2024)

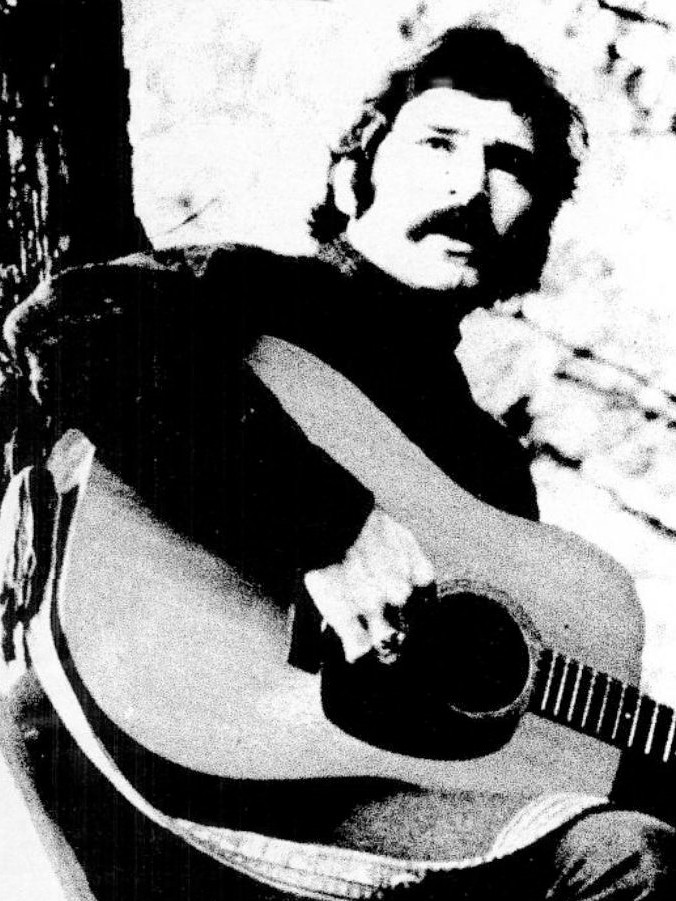
- Traum in 1970

Background information
- Born: Harry Peter Traum; May 9, 1938; New York City, U.S.
- Died: July 17, 2024 (aged 86)
- Genres: Folk
- Occupation: Folk musician
- Instruments: Guitar, vocals

Harry Peter "Happy" Traum (May 9, 1938 – July 17, 2024) was an American folk musician who started playing around Washington Square in the late 1950s. He became a stalwart of the Greenwich Village music scene of the 1960s and the Woodstock music community of the 1970s and 1980s.

== Early life ==
Traum was born on May 9, 1938 in the Bronx, New York City, to parents who were of German Jewish heritage (on his father's side) and English and Dutch heritage (on his mother's side). "Happy" was a family nickname. He attended New York City's competitive High School of Music & Art. As a teenager, Traum frequented the folk music gatherings at Washington Square Park in Greenwich Village. He received his bachelor's degree at New York University.

== Career ==
Traum first appeared on record at a historic session in late 1962 when a group of young folk musicians, including Bob Dylan, Phil Ochs, Pete Seeger, Peter LaFarge, and The Freedom Singers, gathered in the studio at Folkways Records to record an album called Broadside Ballads, Vol. 1. With his group, The New World Singers, Traum cut the first version of "Blowin' in the Wind" to be released (early 1963). Traum also sang a duet with Dylan, who performed under the pseudonym Blind Boy Grunt, on his anti-war song "Let Me Die in My Footsteps". These tracks were re-released in August 2000 by Smithsonian Folkways as part of a boxed set, The Best of Broadside 1962 - 1988: Anthems from the American Underground. Later that year, The New World Singers, which featured Traum, Bob Cohen, and Gil Turner, recorded an album for Atlantic Records, with liner notes by Dylan. The album featured the first recording of Dylan's "Don't Think Twice, It's All Right".

For several years, Traum studied blues guitar with Brownie McGhee, who was a big influence on his guitar style. He was known as one half of Happy and Artie Traum, a duo he began with his brother. They released several albums, including Happy and Artie Traum (1969, Capitol records), Double Back (1971, Capitol), and Hard Times In The Country (1975, Rounder). He continued as a solo artist and as founder of Homespun Music Instruction.

In 1971 Traum once again joined Dylan in the studio, playing guitar, banjo, bass, and singing harmony on four songs, which appeared on Bob Dylan's Greatest Hits Vol. II and The Bootleg Series Vol. 10 – Another Self Portrait (1969–1971). Dylan also invited Happy to participate in a famous session with poet Allen Ginsberg, which resulted in the box set Holy Soul Jelly Roll.

== Death ==
Traum died on July 17, 2024, at the age of 86, after a long battle with pancreatic cancer.

== Discography ==
=== Solo ===
- 1975 Relax Your Mind, Kicking Mule Records KM110 (LP)
- 1977 American Stranger, Kicking Mule Records KM301 (LP)
- 1980 Bright Morning Stars With John Sebastian, Roly Salley, Richard Manuel and Larry Campbell, Greenhays Recordings (LP)
- 1987 Buckets of Songs, Shanachie (CD)
- 2005 I Walk The Road Again, Roaring Stream Records (CD)
- 2015 "Just For the Love Of It," Lark's Nest Music (CD)
- 2025 Live in Holland, 2017, Strictly Country Records (CD)

=== With Artie Traum ===
- 1970 Happy and Artie Traum - Capitol Records (LP)
- 1971 Double Back - Capitol Records (LP)
- 1975 Hard Times in the Country - Rounder Records (reissued as CD in 2005)
- 1994 The Test of Time - Roaring Stream Records (CD)
- 2006 Happy and Artie Traum Live Recordings 1970s and 1980s - Slice of Life Records

=== With various groups ===
- 1963 Broadside, Vol. 1 (both solo and with The New World Singers) - Folkways Records (with Bob Dylan, Phil Ochs, Pete Seeger, The Freedom Singers, and others).
- 1964 The New World Singers - Atlantic Records (liner notes by Bob Dylan)
- 1966 The Children of Paradise - Columbia Records (single) Happy and Artie Traum, Eric Kaz and Marc Silber.
- 1972 Mud Acres: Music Among Friends - Rounder Records (reissued on CD 2005) Happy and Artie produced and performed, along with Eric Kaz, Maria Muldaur, Jim Rooney, Bill Keith, John Herald, Lee Berg and Tony Brown.
- 1976 Woodstock Mountains: More Music from Mud Acres - Rounder (LP) with Happy and Artie, Pat Alger, Eric Andersen, Lee Berg, Rory Block, Paul Butterfield, John Herald, Bill Keith, Jim Rooney, Roly Salley, John Sebastian, Paul Siebel and others.
- 1978 Woodstock Mountains Revue: Pretty Lucky - Rounder (LP)
- 1981 Woodstock Mountains Revue: Back to Mud Acres - Rounder (LP)
- 1987 Woodstock Mountains: Music from Mud Acres - Rounder (CD)
- 1990 Bring It On Home, Vol. 1 and 2 - Sony Legacy (CD) The "Best of..." Happy and Artie's WAMC Public Radio show.
- 2000 The Best of Broadside – Smithsonian/Folkways Boxed Set

=== Recordings as a back-up musician ===
- 1971 Bob Dylan's Greatest Hits, Vol. 2 - Columbia
- 1971 Allen Ginsberg Holy Soul Jelly Roll with Bob Dylan (producer), David Amram, Ed Sanders, et al.
- 2014 Bob Dylan Another Self Portrait

Traum can also be heard on albums with John Sebastian, Chris Smither, Jerry Jeff Walker, Tom Pacheco, Priscilla Herdman, Pete Seeger, Ronnie Gilbert, Peter Schickele ("P. D. Q. Bach"), Eric Andersen, Rory Block, Maria Muldaur, Peter Tosh, Rick Danko, Levon Helm and many others.

== See also ==
- American folk music revival
- Kossoy Sisters
- Tony Saletan
