= Taliesin Orchestra =

American musical group

- Genres: New-age
- Years active: 1996–present

The Taliesin Orchestra (alternately known as Taliesin) is an American musical group that specializes in remaking famous songs into orchestra-style melodies (generally, new-age music).

The band's first album, Orinoco Flow: The Music of Enya, was a collection of songs originally created and sung by Enya; it was released in 1996. Since then the band has recorded several other albums, some of them being further Enya remakes, but also including albums of songs by George Winston and Jim Brickman. Originally on Anthem (1997) and again on Rock Rhapsody (2008) the band covered such famous songs such as Pink Floyd's "Another Brick In The Wall", Eric Clapton's "Layla" and the Beatles' "Hey Jude".

The Taliesin Orchestra is led by keyboardist Trammell Starks and features the voice, vocal arranging, vocal production, and in some cases songwriting of Felicia Farerre (aka Felicia Sorensen). Charles Sayre acts as conductor, producer and arranger.

Orinoco Flow topped the Billboard Top Indie Classical Albums list in May 1998. In the year-end-list of 1997, Orinoco Flow was ranked 8th in Billboards' list of Classical Crossover Albums, and the Taliesin Orchestra in joint 7th among Classical Crossover Artists.

== Discography ==
=== Enya tributes ===
- 1996 Orinoco Flow: The Music of Enya
- 1998 Maiden of Mysteries: Music of Enya
- 2002 Thread of Time: The Best of the Music of Enya
- 2005 Sail Away: The Music of Enya
- 2006 An Instrumental Tribute to the Hits of Enya
- 2009 Tribute to the Hits of Enya

=== Other ===
- 1997 Forbidden Forest: Impressions of George Winston
- 1997 Anthem
- 2002 Sacred
- 2004 Valentine: The Music of Jim Brickman
- 2005 Top of the World: A Tribute to the Carpenters
- 2008 Rock Rhapsody
- 2008 "Bella's Lullaby (Piano Version) For 'Twilight'"
