= Andy Statman =

American musician (born 1950)

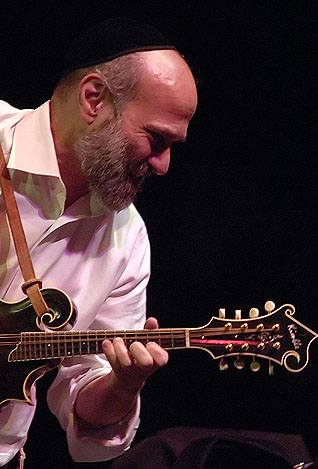
- Statman performing in 2008

Background information
- Born: Andrew Edward Statman; 1950 (age 75–76); New York City
- Genres: Klezmer, bluegrass
- Occupation: Musician
- Instruments: Clarinet, mandolin
- Labels: Rounder, Shanachie, Shefa, Tzadik
- Website: Official website

Andrew Edward Statman (born 1950) is an American klezmer clarinetist and bluegrass/newgrass mandolinist.

== Life and career ==
Statman was born in New York City and grew up in the borough of Queens. Beginning at age 12, he learned to play banjo and guitar, following the example of his older brother Jimmy, and then switched to mandolin, which he studied briefly under lifelong-friend David Grisman.

He learned to play R&B and jazz saxophone, for a time under the tutelage of Richard Grando, who played saxophone in Earth Opera. As a teenager Statman was already performing in public in Washington Square Park and with local string bands. In 1969 he attended Franconia College in Franconia, New Hampshire, but eventually dropped out to pursue a musical career.

He first gained acclaim as a mandolinist as a sideman with David Bromberg and Russ Barenberg, as well as in the pioneering bluegrass bands Country Cookin' and Breakfast Special.

During the course of exploring a wide range of roots and ethnic music, Statman turned to klezmer music, traditional Eastern European Jewish instrumental music. This led Statman, who grew up in a traditional but secular Jewish home, to reconnect with his Jewish roots.

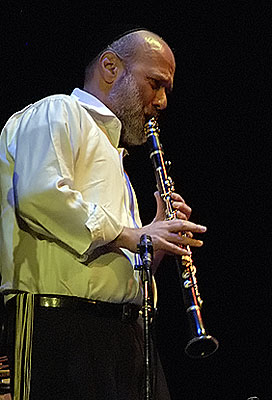
Statman playing clarinet in 2008

Statman studied klezmer clarinet during the 1970s with legendary klezmer clarinetist Dave Tarras, who bequeathed several of his clarinets to him. Statman also produced Dave Tarras's last recording. As a clarinetist, he recorded several albums that were highly influential in the Klezmer revival of those years. Still forging ahead musically, he began playing Chassidic melodies, fusing bluegrass, klezmer, and jazz along the way. Given his apprenticeship with Tarras and his subsequent master classes at workshops such as KlezKamp as well as privately, Statman became a renowned exponent of traditional Jewish and avant-garde clarinet styles.

The Andy Statman Trio, which includes bassist Jim Whitney and percussionist Larry Eagle, plays regularly at Darech Amuno Synagogue in Greenwich Village in New York City, and tours nationally as schedules allow.

In 1983, he performed on the Antilles Records release Swingrass '83.

He has participated in a yearly klezmer concert series with Itzhak Perlman and other klezmer superstars.

In 2007, he was a Grammy Awards nominee in the Best Country Instrumental Performance category for his version of Bill Monroe's "Rawhide" on Shefa CD East Flatbush Blues.

In 2008, Statman appeared as a guest on the Bela Fleck and the Flecktones holiday album Jingle All the Way, playing both clarinet and mandolin. The album won Best Pop Instrumental Album at the 51st Annual Grammy Awards. He joined the group in concert on December 10 at the University at Buffalo, Center for the Arts, and December 16 at Philadelphia's Kimmel Center.

Old Brooklyn, a multi-artist recording project, was released in October 2011 on Shefa Records. This double CD features the American roots, R&B, Chassidic and other sides of his music, performed with his trio, Jim Whitney on bass and Larry Eagle on drums and percussion, along with fiddler Byron Berline and guitarist Jon Sholle. Guest artists include Ricky Skaggs, Béla Fleck, Paul Shaffer, Bruce Molsky, Art Baron, Marty Rifkin, Bob Jones, Lew Soloff, Kristen Muller and John Goodman. His next album was Superstring Theory, released in November 2013, which hosts fiddler Michael Cleveland and guitarist Tim O'Brien.

On June 19, 2012, the National Endowment for the Arts announced that Statman would be awarded a National Heritage Fellowship, the nation's highest honor in the folk and traditional arts. He performed with other recipients of this fellowship in Washington, DC, on October 4, 2012.

In recent years, Statman has played an Aleyas F-5 and a Will Kimble F-5 mandolin, after having played an early 1920s Gibson A2Z for more than 35 years. He plays several Albert-system clarinets.

== Personal information ==
Statman is married to the former Barbara Soloway, an artist, teacher and ceramicist. They have 4 children and 19 grandchildren.

== Discography ==
- 1979 Jewish Klezmer Music
- 1980 Flatbush Waltz
- 1983 Mandolin Abstractions - with David Grisman
- 1985 New Acoustic Music
- 1986 Nashville Mornings, New York Nights
- 1988 Rounder Bluegrass, Vol. 2
- 1992 Andy Statman Klezmer Orchestra
- 1994 Klezmer Suite
- 1994 Andy's Ramble
- 1995 Acoustic Disc: 100% Handmade Music, Vol. 2
- 1995 Doyres (Generations): Traditional Klezmer Recordings, 1979-1994
- 1995 Songs of Our Fathers - with David Grisman
- 1995 Holding On: Dreamers, Visionaries, Eccentrics & Other American Heroes
- 1996 American Fogies, Vol. 1
- 1996 Blue Ribbon Fiddle
- 1996 Klezmer Music: A Marriage of Heaven & Earth
- 1996 Rounder Bluegrass Guitar
- 1997 Between Heaven & Earth: Music of the Jewish Mystics
- 1998 The Hidden Light
- 1998 Holiday Tradition
- 1998 The Soul of Klezmer
- 2000 Klezmer: From Old World To Our World
- 2001 Bluegrass Mountain Style
- 2001 New York City: Global Beat of the Boroughs - Music From New York City's Ethnic....
- 2004 Wisdom, Understanding, Knowledge
- 2005 On Air
- 2006 New Shabbos Waltz - with David Grisman
- 2005 Avodas Halevi
- 2006 East Flatbush Blues
- 2006 Awakening from Above
- 2011 Old Brooklyn
- 2013 Superstring Theory
- 2014 Hallel V'zimrah — Ben Zion Shenker, vocals
- 2014 Songs of the Breslever Chassidim
- 2018 Monroe Bus

== Publications ==
- Statman, Andrew, Teach Yourself Bluegrass Mandolin, Amsco Music Publishing Company, New York, 1978
