= Rowen (name) =

Rowen is both a surname and male given name. Notable people with the name include:

== Surname ==
- Ben Rowen (born 1988), American baseball player
- Ed Rowen (1857–1892), American baseball player
- Chris Rowen (born 1957), American entrepreneur and technologist
- Glenn Rowen (1933–1992), American singer
- Harry Rowen (1925–2015), American economist, security expert etc.
- Herbert H. Rowen (1916–1999), American historian
- Keith Rowen (born 1952), American football coach, son of Vic Rowen
- Paul Rowen (born 1955), British politician
- Vic Rowen (1919–2013), American sports coach

== Given name ==
- Rowen Fernández (born 1978), South African footballer
- Rowen Muscat (born 1991), Maltese footballer
- Rowen Osborn (1924–2012), Australian public servant and diplomat
- Rowen Shepherd (born 1970), Scottish rugby union player

== See also ==
- Rowen (disambiguation)
- Rowan (disambiguation)
- Rowena (disambiguation)
