= Crazy People (The Rowan Brothers album) =

Studio album by The Rowan Brothers
- Released: 2002
- Recorded: 2002
- Genre: Country rock; folk rock
- Label: Evangeline
- Producer: Peter Rowan, Lorin Rowan

The Rowan Brothers chronology
Tree on a Hill (1993)	Crazy People (2002)	Now and Then (2004)

Professional ratings
Review scores
Source	Rating
Allmusic	3/5 stars

Crazy People is an album recorded by The Rowan Brothers in 2002. The album cover was photographed by Peter Rowan's daughter, Amanda Rowan.

== Track listing ==
1. "Crazy People" (Edgar/Monaco)
2. "Nothin' Personal" (Rowan brothers)
3. "Red Rockin'" Chair (trad.)
4. "Pretty Senorita" (Peter Rowan)
5. "Don't Pick the Blossom Before the Flower Grows" (Rowan brothers)
6. "Free Mexican Airforce" (Peter Rowan)
7. "That's Alright (Long Time)" (Rowan brothers)
8. "In 1999" (Rowan brothers)
9. "Shoppin' Feet' (Rowan brothers)
10. "Ain't Nothin' Like a Family" (Rowan brothers)

== Personnel ==
- Lorin Rowan - guitar, vocals
- Peter Rowan - guitar, mandola, spoons, vocals
- Chris Rowan - guitar, vocals

with

- Sam Bush - mandolin
- Larry Atamanuik - drums
- Russell Bond - bass
- Dick Bright - violin
- Bill Amatneek - bass
- Jerry Douglas - dobro
- Dave Grant - bass
- Roy Huskey, Jr. - bass
- Bryn Bright - bass
- Flaco Jiménez - accordion
- Sergio Lara - guitar
- Edgar Meyer - bass
- Tom Mitchell - banjo
- Ethan Turner - drums
- Joe Reyes - guitar
- Mookie Siegel - accordion
- Tim O'Brien - bouzouki
