= Sibling Rivalry (The Rowans album) =

Studio album by The Rowans
- Released: 1976
- Recorded: 1976
- Genre: Country rock; folk rock
- Label: Elektra

The Rowans chronology
The Rowans (1975)	Sibling Rivalry (1976)	Jubilation (1977)

Professional ratings
Review scores
Source	Rating
Allmusic	4.5/5 stars

Sibling Rivalry is the third album by the country rock group The Rowans. It is their second effort recorded as trio with Peter Rowan.

== Track listing ==
1. "Ooh My Love" (Chris Rowan) 4:30
2. "Love Is" (Lorin Rowan, Dudley Glanz, Mark Stein) 4:10
3. "Tired Hands" (Lorin Rowan, Peter Rowan) 5:07
4. "If I Only Could" (Chris Rowan) 3:52
5. "No Desanimes Amor" (Peter Rowan, Juanita West, Amanda Lynn, Woody West) 3:55
6. "Ya Ba da Ba" (Chris Rowan) 2:52
7. "Fire Dragon" (Chris Rowan, Lorin Rowan, Peter Rowan) 0:58
8. "Mongolian Swamp/King's Men" (Lorin Rowan, Peter Rowan) 4:14
9. "Joaquin Murrieta" (Peter Rowan) 8:29
10. "Sword of Faith/Soldier of the Cross" (Lorin Rowan) 4:59

== Personnel ==
- Peter Rowan - guitar, mandolin, vocals
- Chris Rowan - guitar, piano, vocals
- Lorin Rowan - guitar, vocals
- Joe Carroll - bass
- Wally Drogas - drums
- Bill Elliott - organ, piano
- K. Dudley Glanz - drums
- Richard Greene - violin
- Jim Hodder - drums
- Mark Stein - drums
- Peter Walsh - bass
