= Rawan =

Rawan may refer to:

- Rawan, Iran, a village in Iran
- Rawan, Bhulath, a village in India
- Rawan Barzani (born 1981), Kurdish politician

== See also ==
- Rowan (disambiguation)
- Ravan (disambiguation)
