= Jubilation (The Rowans album) =

Studio album by The Rowans
- Released: 1977
- Recorded: 1977
- Genre: Country rock; folk rock
- Label: Asylum Records

The Rowans chronology
Sibling Rivalry (1976)	Jubilation (1977)	Livin' the Life (1980)

Professional ratings
Review scores
Source	Rating
Allmusic	2.5/5 stars

Jubilation is the fourth album by the country rock trio, consisting of brothers Chris, Lorin and Peter Rowan, credited as "The Rowans". It is their third effort recorded as trio with Peter Rowan.

== Track listing ==
1. "Best of Friends" (Lorin Rowan) 3:06
2. "Give Ya Good Lovin'" (Peter Rowan) 3:16
3. "Hoo Doo Love" (Chris Rowan) 5:20
4. "Love' Secret Sighs" (Chris Rowan, Peter Rowan) 2:35
5. "Don't Say Goodbye" (Peter Rowan) 3:40
6. "Lovelight" (Chris Rowan) 4:17
7. "New Horizons" (Lorin Rowan) 4:42
8. "Makin' It Easy" (Chris Rowan, Peter Rowan) 3:41
9. "Calle Music" (Lorin Rowan) 5:14

== Personnel ==
- Peter Rowan - guitar, mandolin, vocals
- Chris Rowan - guitar, piano, vocals
- Lorin Rowan - guitar, mandolin, vocals
- Terry Adams - cello
- Susan Bates - viola
- Nancy Ellis - viola
- Brad Bilhorn - drums
- Stephne Busfield - guitar
- Joe Carroll - bass
- Ralph Carter - bass
- Peter Barshay - bass, drums
- Brian Cooke - piano
- Glenn Cronkhite - percussion
- Glen Deardorff - violin, guitar
- Keith Glanz - drums
- Stephane Grappelli - violin
- Lee Carlton - drums
- Bob Hogins - keyboards
- Daniel Kobialka - violin

== Production ==
- Michael Zagaris - photography
