= Now and Then (The Rowans album) =

Studio album by The Rowan Brothers: Chris & Lorin
- Released: 2004
- Recorded: 2004
- Genre: Country rock; folk rock
- Label: BOS music
- Producer: Chris Rowan, Lorin Rowan

The Rowan Brothers: Chris & Lorin chronology
| Crazy People (2002) | Now and Then (2004) |

Professional ratings
Review scores
| Source | Rating |
|---|---|
| Allmusic | 4/5 stars |

Now and Then is an album recorded by The Rowan Brothers: Chris & Lorin in 2004. It's partly compilation of archive tracks from 1970's, partly newly recorded material.

== Track listing ==
All compositions by Chris and Lorin Rowan

=== CD1 - "Now" ===
1. Circle Of Friends 4:49
2. Heart Of A Woman 3:27
3. Pathways 4:10
4. Burn It On Down 5:22
5. Cold War 3:50
6. I'll Be There 3:48
7. As Much As I Do 3:37
8. Arms Of The One I Love 2:51
9. Don't Forget 3:50
10. Runnin' Wild 2:13
11. Lonely Nights 4:09
12. Swims With Dolphins 1:00
13. How I Think Of You 4:01
14. Angelina 5:02
15. Childish Love 2:35
16. Soldier's Cross 6:35
17. Circle Of Friends (Instrumental Reprise) 1:02

=== CD 2 - "Then" ===
1. Free 1:21
2. Run To The Wind 2:46
3. Climbing Up The Mountain 3:20
4. Don't You Worry 3:24
5. It Grows And Grows 3:46
6. Waiting In The Garden 4:04
7. All In The Way She Moves 2:54
8. Speedway Driver 2:48
9. If I Only Could 2:54
10. Livin' The Life 3:39
11. Guardian Angel 4:47
12. Can't Stop Lovin' You 4:12
13. Feel The Spirit 3:08
14. Peace And Happiness 2:58
15. Laura My Love 2:19
16. Only You 3:22
17. After All Is Said And Done 3:02

== Personnel ==
CD 1 "Now"

- Chris Rowan - acoustic guitar, piano synthesizer, vocals
- Lorin Rowan - acoustic guitar, electric guitar, mandolin, piano, trilogy bass, vocals
- David Grisman - mandolin (track 1)
- Phil Lesh - bass (tracks 13, 16)
- Richard Greene - fiddle (track 8)
- Barry Sless - steel guitar (tracks 3, 4, 5, 8, 9, 13), electric guitar *(track 16)
- Mookie Siegel - piano/accordion (tracks 3, 4, 5, 10)
- Robin Sylvester - bass (tracks 3, 5, 7, 10, 11)
- Brent Rampone - drums (tracks 3, 5, 10, 11)
- Rob Ickes - dobro (track 6)
- Sally Van Meter - dobro (track 8)
- Doug Harman - cello (tracks 1, 4, 6)
- Bill Amatneek - bass (track 9)
- Eric McCann - drum programming (tracks 13, 16)
- Tim Emmons - bass (tracks 8, 15)
- Dick Bright - violin (track 9)
- James Henry - congas, percussion (track 4)
- Michael Spiro - congas (track 14) Musicians "Then"

CD 1 "Then"

- Chris Rowan - acoustic guitar, electric guitar, piano, vocals
- Lorin Rowan - acoustic guitar, electric guitar, mandolin, piano, vocals
- Jerry Garcia - pedal steel guitar (track 6)
- Bill Kreutzmann - drums (tracks 3, 6, 14)
- Jim Keltner - drums (track 11)
- Hal Blaine - drums (tracks 7, 8, 15, 17)
- Joe Osborn - bass (tracks 7, 8, 15, 17)
- Bill Elliott - piano (track 11)
- John Douglas - piano (track 12)
- Peter Rowan - background vocals (tracks 7, 8, 17)
