= Rowan (disambiguation) =

Rowans are a genus (or subgenus) of deciduous trees.

Rowan may also refer to:

== Places ==
=== Iran ===
- Rowan, Iran, a village in Hamadan Province

=== United States ===
- Rowan, Iowa, a city
- Rowan County, Kentucky
- Rowan County, North Carolina

=== Outer space ===
- 4599 Rowan, a main belt asteroid discovered in 1985

== Arts and entertainment ==
=== Literature ===
- The Rowan, a novel by Anne McCaffrey

=== Music ===
- The Rowans, also known as The Rowan Brothers, an American country-rock group
  - The Rowans (album), a 1975 album by The Rowans
- Rowan, a 2006 album by Maggie Reilly
- The Rowan Tree, a Scottish folk song

== Schools ==
- Rowan University in Glassboro, New Jersey, United States
- Rowan College at Burlington County, Mount Laurel, New Jersey, United States
- Rowan College of South Jersey, Sewell, New Jersey, United States

== Ships ==
- USS Rowan, four US Navy vessels
- HMS Rowan, a First World War armed boarding steamer of the Royal Navy
- HMS Rowan, a Second World War Royal Navy Tree class trawler

== Other uses ==
- Rowan (name), a surname and personal name
- Rowan Building, a building in Los Angeles, California, United States
- Rowan Companies, a defunct offshore drilling contractor, now part of Valaris Limited
- Rowan Hall, Miami University, Oxford, Ohio, United States
- Rowan Museum, Salisbury, North Carolina, United States
- Rowan Software, a British computer game development company
- Rowan steam railmotor, a steam railcar

== See also ==
- Rawan (disambiguation)
- Rowen (disambiguation)
