= Tree on a Hill =

Studio album by Peter Rowan & The Rowan Brothers
- Released: 1994
- Recorded: 1994
- Genre: Country rock; folk rock
- Label: Sugar Hill Records
- Producer: Peter Rowan

Peter Rowan & The Rowan Brothers chronology
Livin' the Life (1980)	Tree on a Hill (1994)	Crazy People (2002)

Professional ratings
Review scores
Source	Rating
AllMusic	3.5/5 stars

Tree on a Hill is an album recorded by Peter Rowan & The Rowan Brothers in 1994.

== Track listing ==
1. "Tree on a Hill" (Rowan)
2. "Man of Constant Sorrow" (Traditional)
3. "Little Darlin' Pal of Mine" (Carter)
4. "No Lonesome Tune" (VanZandt)
5. "Rye Whiskey"
6. "Fair and Tender Ladies"
7. "Faith, Love and Devotion" (Rowan)
8. "Long Time" (Rowan, Rowan)
9. "Lone Pilgrim" (Traditional)
10. "I'll Be There" (Rowan, Rowan, VanZandt)
11. "Mary Magdalene" (Rowan)

== Personnel ==
- Peter Rowan - guitar, banjo, vocals
- Lorin Rowan - mandolin, guitar, vocals
- Chris Rowan - guitar, vocals
- Viktor Krauss - bass
- Richard Greene - fiddle
- Sally Van Meter - dobro, guitar
- Cindy Cashdollar - dobro, guitar
- Kester Smith - percussion
