= Amanda Rowan =

American photographer, filmmaker and actress

- Born: January 3, 1979 (age 47); Northern California, United States
- Education: TISCH School of the Arts
- Occupations: Actress, photographer
- Parent(s): Peter Rowan (father); Leslie Rowan (mother)
- Relatives: Maria Muldaur (godmother); Chris Rowan and Lorin Rowan (uncles)

Amanda Rose Rowan (born January 3, 1979) is an American photographer, filmmaker and actress. She is the daughter of bluegrass musician Peter Rowan and fashion stylist and model Leslie Rowan. She is known for several acting roles in film and television.

== Early life ==
Rowan was brought up surrounded by prolific musicians; her godmother is singer Maria Muldaur and her uncles are Chris Rowan and Lorin Rowan of The Rowan Brothers. Born and raised in Northern California, Rowan moved to NYC to attend the Tisch School of the Arts at NYU with a double major in performing arts and photography, graduating cum laude in 2001.

Rowan has always enjoyed music, singing, and songwriting. At age eight, she collaborated with her father Peter Rowan on the lyrics for the song "On the Wings of Horses" (from the Grammy-nominated album Dustbowl Children). The song was later recorded by Emmylou Harris on Disney's Country Music for Kids album. Throughout her childhood, Rowan toured with her father around the world, often performing with him onstage.

== Career ==
=== Photography ===
In high school, Rowan was given her first camera. She then discovered her passion for photography, taking pictures at her father's rock concerts and staging photo shoots with friends. She is known for a whimsical style of iconic portrait photography that often lends a heightened sense of reality. These photoshoots have evolved today into a portrait portfolio that includes many celebrity subjects, among them Rufus Wainwright, Inara George, Sean Lennon, Diva Zappa, Amy Smart, Harper Simon Paris Hilton, Jenni Muldaur and the water ballet company Aqualillies.

In 2004 she founded Rowan Imagery, a New York and Los Angeles-based photography company specializing in editorial, portrait and press photography. Her work has been published by New York Magazine for Grub Street, by Total Beauty, and by the Beverage Media Group. She is also a contributing photographer for Kimberly Belle's lauded food and wedding blog "I Love Farm Weddings".

=== Acting and filmmaking ===
In addition to many theater roles (including in the acclaimed 2006 revival of Noises Off), Rowan has appeared on TV shows such as Law & Order: Special Victims Unit, Law & Order: Criminal Intent, and CSI. She also starred opposite Dave Chappelle in his last sketch on Chappelle's Show. and appears opposite Paris Hilton in the National Lampoon comedy Pledge This, with Geoffrey Arend. Following the film's release, Rowan starred in the Nederlander Organization-produced national tour of Of Mice and Men, playing Curly's wife.

In 2008, Rowan produced and played the lead role in the film She Pedals Fast, for a Girl, which she co-wrote with filmmaker Eva Vives. This romantic film depicts the life of a female NYC bike messenger by day and a cabaret singer by night. Rowan collaborated with her father on the film's original song, "Paris is a Lonely Town". In 2011 she produced and acted in the comedy feature film Hold On Loosely.

== Exhibitions ==
=== Solo exhibitions ===
- January 2021, Public Offerings, London
- April 2020, The H Club Los Angeles/ London
- March 2020, Close Up curated by Patricia Lanza, The Eye of Photography

=== Group exhibitions ===
- Permanent collection at Palms Casino Resort in Las Vegas with Damien Hirst, Jean-Michel Basquiat, Andy Warhol, and Takashi Murakami.
- February 2020, The H Club, Los Angeles
- January 2020, Photo LA
- October 2019 "Photo District News- Fine Art Photography" curated by Holly Hues and Photo District News, Chelsea, NYC
- September 2019 "PhotoVille," DUMBO, Brooklyn
- February 2019 OWADA Gallery, Shibuya Tokyo.
- January 2019 "Women In Color" at LA ART Show with Carrie Able Gallery, curated by Kayla Coleman, LA
- December 2018 "Creative Portrait Exhibition," Los Angeles Center of Photography, curated by Nicholas & David Fahey
- December 2018 "Ritual," Pulse Art Fair- Art Basel, with Carie Able Gallery, Miami Beach, FL
- November 2018 Analogue Forever Magazine, Group Show
- August 2018 "Ritual"- Carie Able Gallery, Summer Show, Curated by Float Magazine. Brooklyn, NY
- 2016 "Born Backstage," Wall Street Gallery, Produced by Mr. Brainwash, Los Angeles, CA.
- 2011 Aqualillies Water Ballet co. Photography and performance collaboration
- 2011 Red Cat, Let's Call It Valencia. D300, Cal Arts. Performance collaboration with Alexa Gerrity.
