= Ravan =

Ravan, Raavan or Ravanan, may refer to:

== Film and TV ==
- Raavan (1984 film), Indian Hindi-language film
- Ravanan (1994 film), 1994 Indian Tamil-language film starring Mansoor Ali Khan
- Ravanan (2006 film), 2006 Indian Malayalam-language film starring Kalabhavan Mani
- Ra.One or Raavan, 2011 Indian Hindi-language science fiction film
  - Ra.One, the main antagonist of the film played by Arjun Rampal, modelled after the character in the Ramayana
- Raavan (2022 film), Indian Bengali-language action thriller film
- Two Indian films simultaneously directed and produced by Mani Ratnam:
  - Raavan (2010 film), the Hindi-language version starring Abhishek Bachchan and Aishwarya Rai
    - Raavan (soundtrack), by A. R. Rahman
  - Raavanan (2010 film), the Tamil-language version starring Vikram and Aishwarya Rai
    - Raavanan (soundtrack), by A. R. Rahman
- Raavan (TV series), a 2006-2008 Indian mythological drama television series

== Given name ==
- Ravan A. G. Farhâdi (1929–2026), Afghan academic and diplomat

== Places ==
- Ravan, Busovača, a village in Bosnia and Herzegovina
- Ravan, Brod-Posavina County, a village near Sibinj, Croatia
- Ravan (island), an islet near Žirje, Croatia
- Ravan, Hamadan, a village in Iran
- Ravan, Kermanshah, a village in Iran
- Ravan (river), in Russia

== Religion ==
- Ravana, Ravan or Ravanan, the prime antagonist in the ancient Hindu epic Ramayana

== Other uses ==
- Ravan (comics), a DC Comics character
- Raavan: Enemy of Aryavarta, a novel by Amish Tripathi
- Eliezer ben Nathan (1090–1170), or Ra'avan, German halakist and liturgical poet
- Ravan Press, a South African anti-apartheid publishing house
- OFK Ravan, a Bosnian football club
- Ravana (gastropod), a genus of gastropods in the family Ariophantidae

== See also ==
- Ravenna (disambiguation)
- Rawan (disambiguation)
- Raban (disambiguation)
- Ravanayan, a 2011 comic series by Vivek Goel and Vijayendra Mohanty, based on the Ramayana and from the perspective of Ravana
- Ravan Asura, a 2023 Indian film
- Aaj Ka Ravan (lit. 'Today's Ravana'), a 2000 Indian film
