= Lyuban (town), Leningrad Oblast =

Town in Leningrad Oblast, Russia

Lyuban Любань
- Town
- Flag Coat of arms
- Interactive map of Lyuban
- Location of Lyuban Lyuban (Leningrad Oblast)
- Coordinates: 59°21′N 31°15′E
- Country: Russia
- Federal subject: Leningrad Oblast
- Administrative district: Tosnensky District
- Settlement municipal formationSelsoviet: Lyubanskoye Settlement Municipal Formation
- First mentioned: 15th century
- Town status since: June 3, 1917
- Elevation: 41 m (135 ft)

Population (2010 Census)
  - Total: 4,188
  - Estimate (2024): 4,321 (+3.2%)

Administrative status
  - Capital of: Lyubanskoye Settlement Municipal Formation

Municipal status
  - Municipal district: Tosnensky Municipal District
  - Urban settlement: Lyubanskoye Urban Settlement
  - Capital of: Lyubanskoye Urban Settlement
- Time zone: UTC+3 (MSK)
- Postal code: 187050
- OKTMO ID: 41648105001

Lyuban (Russian: Любань, IPA: [lʲʊˈbanʲ]) is a town in Tosnensky District of Leningrad Oblast, Russia, located on the Tigoda River 85 kilometers (53 mi) southeast of St. Petersburg. Population: 4,188 (2010 census); 4,616 (2002 census); 5,078 (1989 Soviet census). The median age is 40.9 and the population of Lyuban is 53.5% female.

== History ==
It was first mentioned in the 15th century as a trade settlement. In 1851, a railway station was built and the development of the settlement of Lyuban-Gorka (Любань-Горка), serving the railway station started. On June 3, 1917, Lyuban-Gorka was granted town status and renamed Lyuban. Lyuban was a part of Novgorodsky Uyezd of Novgorod Governorate.

On August 1, 1927, the uyezds were abolished and Lyubansky District, with the administrative center in Lyuban, was established. The governorates were also abolished and the district became a part of Leningrad Okrug of Leningrad Oblast. On August 15, 1930, the okrugs were abolished as well and the districts were directly subordinated to the oblast. On August 19, 1930, Lyubansky District was abolished and Lyuban became a part of the newly established Tosnensky District. Between September 1941 and January 1944, during World War II, Lyuban was occupied by German troops.

== Administrative and municipal status ==
Within the framework of administrative divisions, it is, together with 25 rural localities, incorporated within Tosnensky District as Lyubanskoye Settlement Municipal Formation. As a municipal division, Lyubanskoye Settlement Municipal Formation is incorporated within Tosnensky Municipal District as Lyubanskoye Urban Settlement.

== Economy ==
=== Industry ===
The main industrial enterprise is a lumber plant.

=== Transportation ===
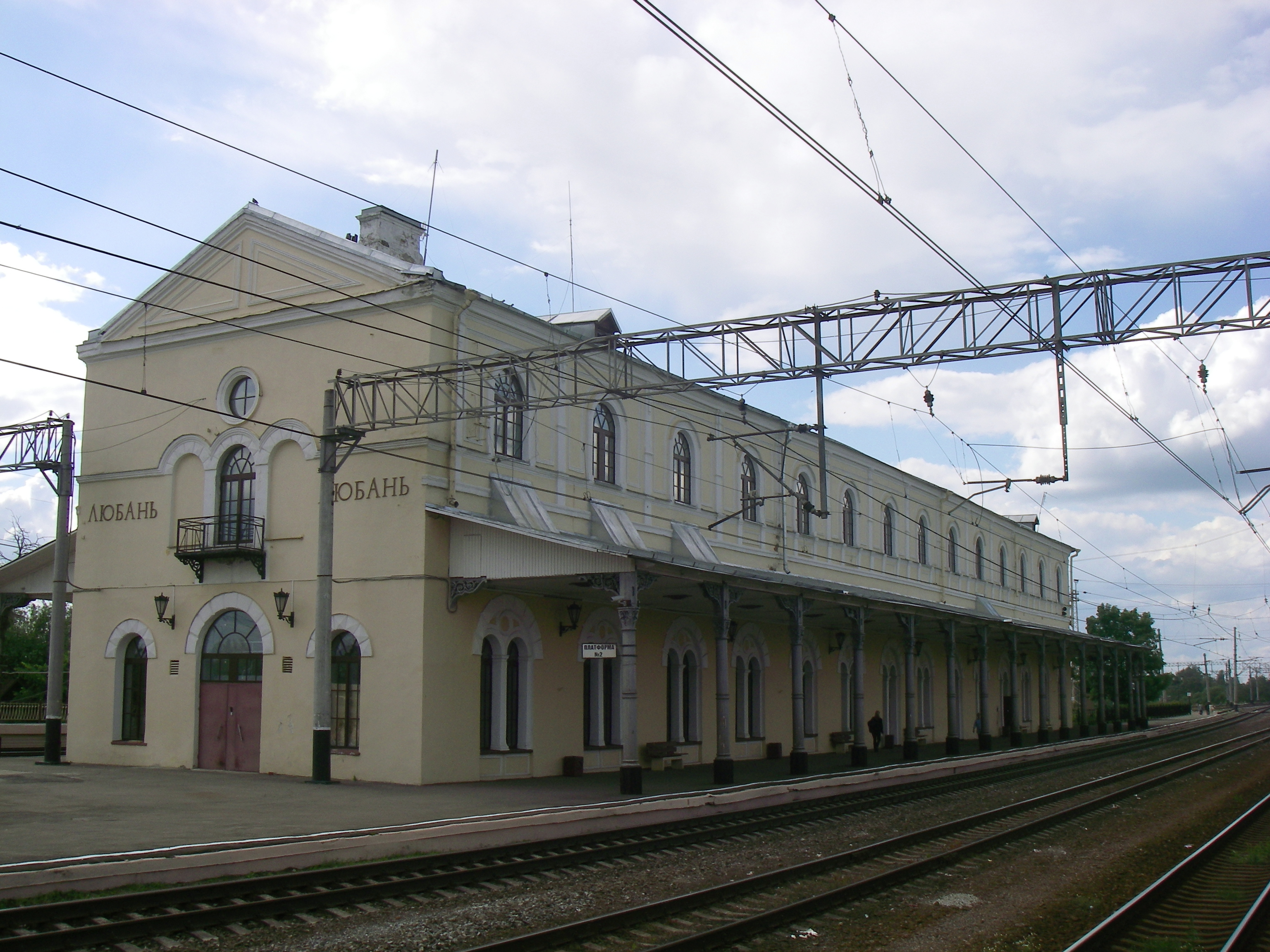
Lyuban railway station

The Saint Petersburg – Moscow Railway and the M10 Highway, connecting Moscow and St. Petersburg, run through the town. Lyuban is also connected by roads with Luga and with Kirovsk via Mga.

== Culture and recreation ==
Lyuban contains two cultural heritage monuments of federal significance and additionally eight objects classified as cultural and historical heritage of local significance. The federal monuments are the tombs of Pavel Melnikov and Alexey Bolotov, engineers coordinating the construction of the railway. The tomb of painter Andrei Ryabushkin at the same cemetery is protected as a cultural monument of local significance.

== See also ==
- Chudovo (air base)
