= Livin' the Life (album) =

Studio album by Chris & Lorin Rowan
- Released: 1980
- Recorded: 1971
- Genre: Country rock; folk rock
- Label: Appaloosa Records
- Producer: David Grisman, Chris Rowan, Lorin Rowan

Chris & Lorin Rowan chronology
Jubilation (1977)	Livin' the Life (1980)	Tree on a Hill (1994)

Professional ratings
Review scores
Source	Rating
Allmusic	2/5 stars

Livin' the Life is an album by Chris and Lorin Rowan, recorded in 1971, containing unreleased studio recordings.

== Track listing ==
1. "Livin' the Life" (Chris Rowan)
2. "Climbing Up The Mountain" (Lorin Rowan)
3. "Waiting in the Garden" (Chris & Lorin Rowan)
4. "Outside, Clover and Cheese" (Lorin Rowan)
5. "Peace and Happiness (Jungle Queen)" (Chris Rowan)
6. "Guardian Angel (They Were There)" (Lorin Rowan)
7. "Heavens to Betsy" (Chris Rowan)
8. "Feel the Spirit" (Lorin Rowan)
9. "Free" (Chris & Lorin Rowan)
10. "Run to the Wind" (Chris & Lorin Rowan)
11. "Don't You Worry" (Chris Rowan)

== Personnel ==
- Chris Rowan - guitar, piano, vocals
- Lorin Rowan - guitar, piano, vocals
- Billy Wolf - bass
- Bill Kreutzmann - drums
- David Grisman - mandolin, piano, organ
- Gregg Dewey - drums
- Ed Bogus - strings
- Jerry Garcia - pedal steel guitar
- Bill Elliott - piano
