= Rubber Souldiers =

American Beatles jam band

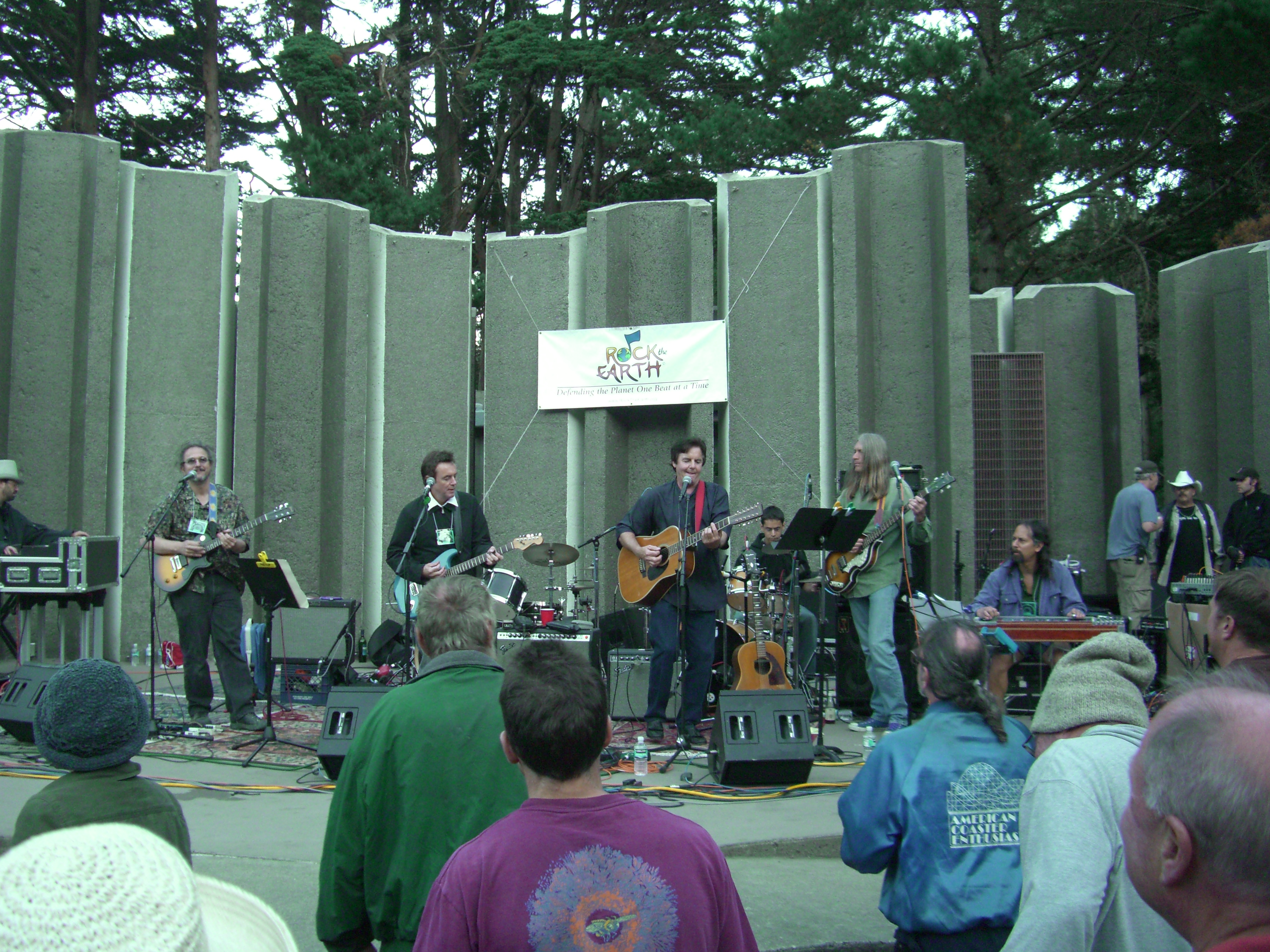
- Rubber Souldiers playing at Jerry Garcia Amphitheater, 2006-09-17

Background information
- Origin: San Francisco Bay Area
- Genres: Rockabilly, tribute band, jam band
- Years active: 2004 - present
- Members: David Gans; Chris Rowan; Lorin Rowan
- Website: www.rubbersouldiers.com

Rubber Souldiers is a Beatles jam band consisting of David Gans, Chris Rowan and Lorin Rowan.

== About ==
The band’s origins are somewhat serendipitous. An impromptu rendition of "Baby's in Black" during a sound check led to an entire afternoon of jamming, one Beatles' tune after another. The Rowan brothers’ background in bluegrass and folk rock flavored David’s deadhead jam-band stylings to produce a result all three knew was useful.

Rubber Souldiers is, as David puts it, Beatles vocabulary with a Grateful Dead syntax. The band plays what can be described as medleys, riffing one melody before segueing into another, sometimes borrowing themes from an entirely different song to play melodic similarities in the repertoire of The Beatles.

The band performs at venues like Slim's, The Warfield, and the Jerry Garcia Amphitheater in San Francisco, and the Freight & Salvage in Berkeley. It has also appeared at the Suwannee SpringFest in Live Oak, Florida.
