= In No Sense? Nonsense! =

Studio album by Art of Noise
- Released: 28 September 1987
- Genre: Synthpop
- Length: 41:42
- Label: China/Chrysalis
- Producer: Anne Dudley, J. J. Jeczalik

Art of Noise chronology
In Visible Silence (1986)	In No Sense? Nonsense! (1987)	Below the Waste (1989)

Professional ratings
Review scores
Source	Rating
Allmusic	4/5 stars
Christgau's Record Guide	B−
Record Mirror	2/5 stars

In No Sense? Nonsense! is the third full-length album by Art of Noise, released in 1987 by China Records.

== Background and recording ==
By the time of its recording, the group had been reduced to a duo, with the engineer Gary Langan leaving the previous year; Langan's mix engineering work was taken over by Bob Kraushaar and Ted Hayton for this album, but the music was produced entirely by Anne Dudley and J.J. Jeczalik. With this album, the group expanded its sound to include rock and orchestral instrumentation, in addition to its trademark sampling.

Many of the album's tracks are seamlessly segued; ambient soundscapes blend into percussive rhythms, dramatic buildups, melodic string arrangements, clarinet ensemble arrangements, and vocal choruses and chants. The sounds of various forms of transport are a recurrent theme. Musical motifs from "Dragnet", "Galleons of Stone" and "Ode to Don Jose" recur throughout the album. In addition, "Roundabout 727" samples "A Nation Rejects", a B-side from the In Visible Silence album.

== Release ==
The original LP and cassette releases end side A with "E.F.L." and resume with "Ode to Don Jose" on side B. For the CD pressings that followed, "Don Jose" and its following track, "A Day at the Races", were swapped. To compensate for the change, the field recording from the end of "Don Jose" were appended to "E.F.L." instead. Some cassette pressings of this album have the same program recorded on both sides, due to the advantages of C90 tape and the desire to keep the album as one continuous piece.

On 2 November 2018, the album was re-released in a new, expanded "deluxe" format alongside 20+ remixes, 12-inch versions and expanded versions of the original tracks on the album, including many tracks which didn't make the original album first time around. Some of these were originally featured in the band's track "Acton Art", which formed part of the B side package of the single and 12-inch versions of the band's track "Dragnet".

"Ransom on the Sand" is sampled in "Melt", the fourth track of Leftfield's 1995 album Leftism.

== Track listing ==
All tracks written by Anne Dudley and J. J. Jeczalik, except where noted.

Side one

1. "Galleons of Stone" (Jeczalik)
2. "Dragnet" (Walter Schumann)
3. "Fin Du Temps"
4. "How Rapid?"
5. "Opus for Four"
6. "Debut" (Dudley)
7. "E.F.L."

Side two

1. "Ode to Don Jose"
2. "A Day at the Races"
3. "Counterpoint"
4. "Roundabout 727"
5. "Ransom on the Sand" (Jeczalik)
6. "Roller 1"
7. "Nothing Was Going to Stop Them Then, Anyway"
8. "Crusoe"
9. "One Earth"

== Personnel ==
Credits adapted from LP liner notes, except where noted.

Additional musicians

- Robert Ahwai – guitar (2)
- George Webley – bass guitar (2)
- Frank Ricotti – percussion (2, 5, 7)
- Dave Bronze – bass guitar (5, 7)
- Paul Robinson – drums (5, 7)
- Tony Fisher – trumpet (13)
- Maurice Murphy – trumpet (13)
- James Talbot – saxophone (13)
- Colin Sheen – trombone (13)
- Peter Rowan – voice (15)

Choristers on "How Rapid?" and "Nothing Was Going to Stop Them Then, Anyway"

- Benjamin Adderley, Francis Ambrose, Douglas Bowen, Keith Burrowes, Alexander Costello, Benjamin Dixon, Jonathon Edge, Benjamin Greatorex, Simon Harris, Robert Howe, Adrian Hum, David James-Roll, Matthew Meynell (deputy head-chorister), Timothy Morgan, Daniel Parker, Alastair Stout, Alistair Taylor, Ian Weide (head chorister)

Lay clerks on "How Rapid?" and "Nothing Was Going to Stop Them Then, Anyway"

- Tim Barthope (altos)
- Harold Lindsay (altos)
- Peter North (tenors)
- David Watt (tenors)
- Richard Clover (basses)
- Paul Smith (basses)

Orchestra on "Debut"

- Violins: Bernard Partridge, Desmond Bradley, Roger Garland, Colin Stavely, David Katz, James Archer, Howard Ball, Barry Wilde, Ian Mackinnon, Liz Edwards, Antonina Bialas, John Bradbury, Galina Salodchin, Peter Oxer, Peter Hansen, Donald Weekes, Mark Thomas
- Violas: Rusen Gunes, Graeme Scott, Norris Bosworth, Tony Harris
- Cellos: Peter Willison, Quentin Williams, Alan Dalziel, Marilyn Sansom, Cathy Giles, Robin Firmna
- Double basses: Mike Brittain, Tony Martin

Technical

- Art of Noise – arrangers, producers
- Bob Kraushaar – engineer (1, 3, 9, 12), mixing (1, 6, 9, 12, 15)
- Roger Dudley – engineer (2, 8, 11, 13, 15), mixing (2, 11, 13)
- Ted Hayton – engineer (2, 4, 10, 14), mixing (2, 5, 7, 10, 15)
- Dietmar Schillinger – assistant engineer (2)
- John Jacobs – mixing (3, 8)
- Jay Bee – mixing assistant (3)
- Dr. Arthur Wills – music director (4, 14), Ely Cathedral Choir director (10)
- Stuart Breed – engineer (5, 7)
- Lance Phillips – assistant engineer (5, 7)
- Nick Varack – mixing assistant (5–7, 15)
- Richard Lewzy – engineer (6)
- Colin Sheen – orchestra contractor (6)
- John Georgiadis – orchestra leader (6)
- Barry Clempson – engineer (15)
- Alan David-Tu – colour photography
- Peter Ashworth – black and white photography
- John Pasche – art direction
- Roland Williams – design typographics
