= Chudovo (air base) =

Air base in Leningrad Oblast, Russia

- Lyuban, Leningrad Oblast in Russia

Site information
- Type: Air Base
- Owner: Ministry of Defence

Location
- Shown within Leningrad Oblast Chudovo (Russia)
- Coordinates: 59°14′18″N 031°16′12″E

Site history
- In use: -present

Airfield information
- Elevation: 50 metres (164 ft) AMSL
Runways
Direction	Length and surface
17/35	2,000 metres (6,562 ft) Concrete

Chudovo (also Chudovo Northwest) is a former air base in Leningrad Oblast, Russia located 12 km south of Lyuban. It appears to be an abandoned bare-bones forward deployment base and is cut tightly into forest. It is currently used as a parachute school. Russian sources mostly refer to it as "Lyuban", in reference to the nearby town.
