= National Lampoon's Pledge This! =

- Promotional poster
- Directed by: William Heins
- Written by: Cheryl Guerriero; Anna Obropta
- Produced by: Jack Utsick; Juan-Carlos Zapata
- Starring: Paris Hilton; Paula Garcés; Sarah Carter; Simon Rex; Holly Valance; Elizabeth Daily; Kerri Kenney Silver; Alexis Thorpe
- Cinematography: Fortunato Procopio
- Edited by: Michael Matzdorff
- Music by: Carlos Durango; Ralph Rieckermann
- Production company: Paris Hilton Entertainment
- Distributed by: Pop Films LLC
- Release date: December 19, 2006
- Running time: 91 minutes (Note: Unrated cut runs 93 minutes)
- Country: United States
- Language: English
- Budget: $8.3 million
- Box office: $1,751,490

National Lampoon's Pledge This! is a 2006 American comedy film starring Paris Hilton, who also served as an executive producer. The film was released straight to video.

== Plot ==
When a dorm toilet explodes on the first day back to school, a group of misfit girls are forced to leave their housing and search for a new home. They ultimately decide on pledging a sorority. However, not many sororities are normal at South Beach University. The girls decide to pledge the most popular and exclusive sorority at the university, Gamma Gamma, which is led by president Victoria English.

While pledging the sorority, Victoria sends the girls to do a task: collect used condoms. While searching the park, the leader of the group, Gloria, bumps into Victoria's boyfriend Derek, and they become close. The only reason Victoria plans to let the freshmen pledge is to display diversity, which is a requirement for the "FHM Hottest Sorority in the Country" contest. From then on, Victoria declares war on the girls during "Hell Week" but ultimately lets them join, only to kick them out once they have won the contest. This angers the leader of the misfit freshmen, Gloria. Gloria decides to quit the sorority as do her friends. Derek and Gloria realize their feelings towards each other and seal it with a kiss.

Gloria's ex-best friend, Kristen, convinces Gloria to come back. Gloria and her friends come back but only to declare war on Victoria by sneaking into the Gamma Gamma house and stealing embarrassing photos and video footage of her to show to everyone at the Gamma Gamma victory party. The video also showed her badmouthing her sorority sisters, and her past dorky self. She also reveals to Victoria that she and Derek love each other. Victoria becomes embarrassed and eventually realizes how reinventing herself made her into a bad person, so she makes a public apology to the freshmen. The movie ends with a giant food fight at the Gamma Gamma party, and Victoria saying that she loved her cover of FHM so much she bought the magazine. Gloria becomes the president of Gamma Gamma the following year.

== Cast ==
- Paris Hilton as Victoria English
- Paula Garcés as Gloria
- Sarah Carter as Kristen
- Simon Rex as Derek
- Holly Valance as Jessica
- Elizabeth Daily as Catherine Johnson
- Kerri Kenney Silver as Kathy
- Alexis Thorpe as Morgan
- Geoffrey Arend as Dax
- Noureen DeWulf as "PooPoo" Patel
- Kyle Richards as Lisa
- Greg Cipes as Reed
- Sarai Howard as Tonya
- Amanda Lee Aday as Maxine Picker
- Dieter Meier as "Gamsie"
- Eugenio Derbez-Gonzalez as Jose
- Preston Lacy as Randy
- Sofía Vergara as Herself / Presenter FHM Hostess
- Carmen Electra as Herself / FHM Invited Hostess
- Paulina Rubio as Herself
- Nicky Hilton (uncredited) as Nicky
- Amanda Rowan as Trista
- Lin Shaye as Miss Prin
- Mickey as Heather

== Production ==
Principal photography began in early 2004 in Miami, Florida, before Hilton started filming her theatrical debut House of Wax. Filming finished later that same year and a trailer was released on the film's official website. However, producers wanted Pledge This! to have an R-rating, which would allow more nudity in the film. Hilton disagreed with the proposal. More scenes with nudity were shot, thus pushing the film back to mid-2005.

Post production was finalized at World Entertainment - LA in Los Angeles by Edward Oleschak.

Due to the hurricanes that hit Florida in 2005, filming was delayed and then ultimately moved. This pushed the movie back to early 2006. Fans were confused that the trailer had proclaimed this film as "Paris Hilton's film debut" when she had previously appeared in 2005's House of Wax. Finally in spring of 2006, it was announced that National Lampoon's Pledge This! would be released as an unrated DVD on December 19, 2006. It was also released on a rated R edition. Hilton did not attend the film's premiere in protest of the addition of aforementioned nude scenes, saying, "I was so angry I snubbed my own premiere." In August 2008, Worldwide Entertainment Group Inc. sued Hilton in the Miami District Court, alleging she did not honor her contractual agreement to provide "reasonable promotion and publicity" for the film.

== Critical reception ==
Pledge This! has a 0% approval rating on review aggregator Rotten Tomatoes based on 6 critical reviews. Heather Boerner of Common Sense Media rated it 1 star out of 5, writing that "this film treats everyone in it in a derogatory fashion." Felix Gonzales Jr. of DVDReview.com called the film "another steaming pile of excrement to be cut loose from the bowels of National Lampoon," and stated that it is "the latest example of everything that is wrong with contemporary comedy, the youth film, Hollywood commercialism, the power of celebrity, and the direct-to-DVD market." Brian Orndorf of DVD Talk called Pledge This! "a simple serving of dumb comedy, hitting up all the highlights of the American Pie brand name and other gross-out comedies (Van Wilder is also a strong influence) to construct something loose and breezy to hand some nudity on."
