= The Rowan Brothers =

Rowan Brothers

Studio album by The Rowan Brothers
- Released: 1972
- Recorded: 1972
- Genre: Country rock; folk rock
- Label: Asylum
- Producer: Bill Wolf, David Grisman

The Rowan Brothers chronology
| Rowan Brothers (1972) | The Rowans (1975) |

Professional ratings
Review scores
| Source | Rating |
|---|---|
| AllMusic | 4/5 stars |

Rowan Brothers is the debut studio album by the country rock duo The Rowan Brothers.

== Track listing ==
1. "Hickory Day"
2. "All Together"
3. "Best You Can"
4. "One More Time"
5. "Lay Me Down"
6. "Wizard"
7. "Mama Don't You Cry"
8. "Gold"
9. "Love Will Conquer"
10. "Lady of Laughter"
11. "Move on Down"
12. "Singin' Song"

== Personnel ==
- Chris Rowan - guitar, vocals
- Lorin Rowan - guitar, vocals
- Beverly Bellows - harp
- Iasos Bernadot - flute
- Ed Bogas - strings
- Jack Bonus - flute, saxophone
- Bill Elliott - keyboards
- Buddy Emmons - steel guitar
- Richard Fenner - violoncello
- Jerry Garcia - guitar
- Jim Keltner - drums
- Bill Kreutzmann - drums
- Peter Rowan - guitar, mandolin, vocals
