= Chagoda (river) =

River in Leningrad Oblast, Russia

- Native name: Чагода (Russian)

Location
- Country: Russia

Physical characteristics
- Mouth: Tigoda
  - coordinates: 59.346°N 31.7344°E
- Length: 35 km (22 mi)
- Basin size: 165 km^{2} (64 sq mi)

Basin features
- Progression: Tigoda→ Volkhov→ Lake Ladoga→ Neva→ Gulf of Finland

The Chagoda (Russian: Чагода) is a river in Leningrad Oblast, Russia, a left tributary of the Tigoda. It starts at an elevation of 40 metres (130 ft) above sea level and after flowing for 35 kilometres (22 mi) joins Tigoda at an elevation of 18 metres (59 ft). It has a drainage basin of 165 square kilometres (64 sq mi).
