= Tigoda =

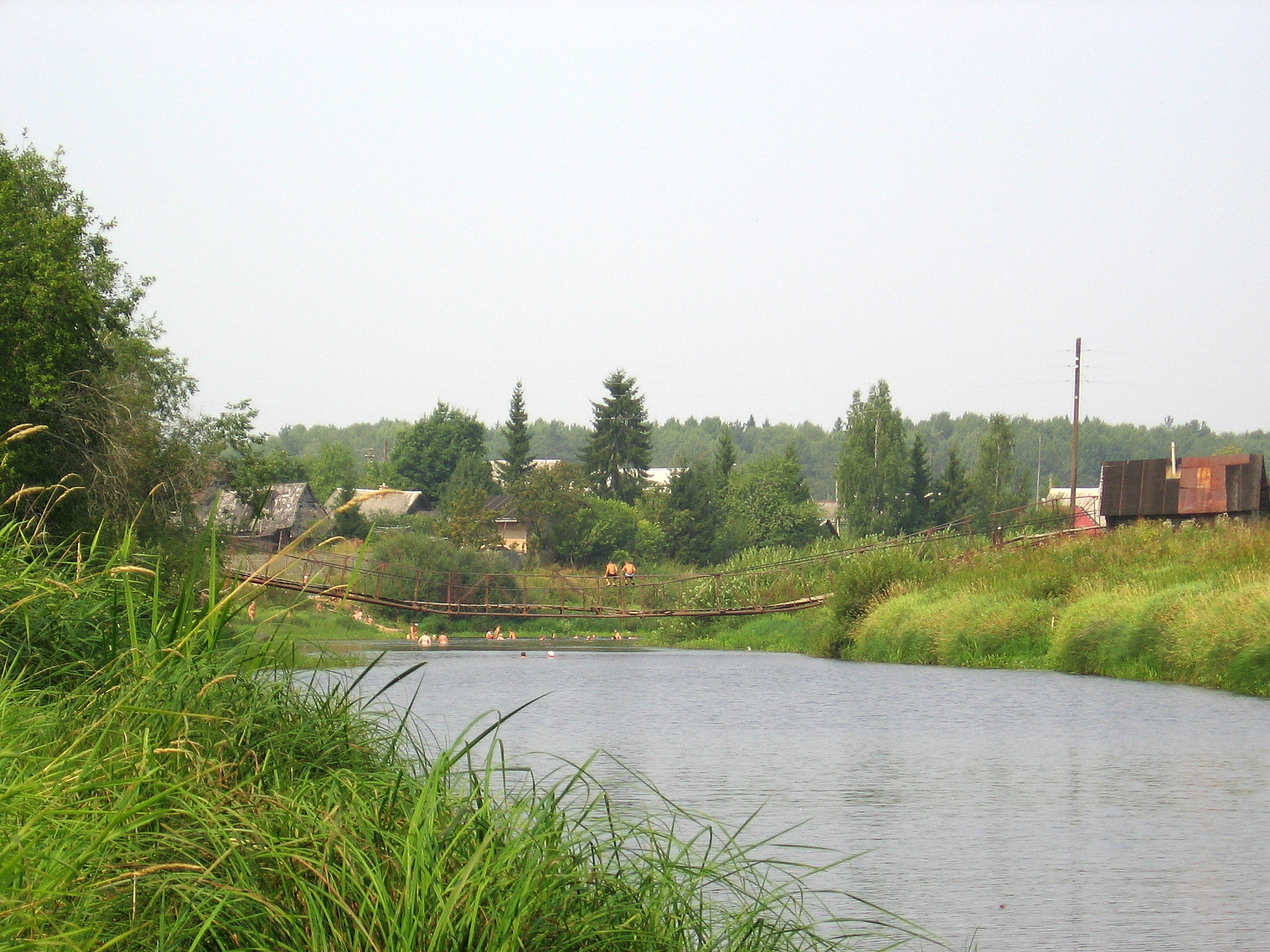

Location
- Country: Russia

Physical characteristics
- Source
  - location: Ogorelye
  - elevation: 55 m (180 ft)
- Mouth: Volkhov
  - coordinates: 59°22′03″N 31°53′42″E
- Length: 143 km (89 mi)
- Basin size: 2,290 km^{2} (880 sq mi)
- Discharge
  - average: 4 m^{3}/s (140 cu ft/s)

Basin features
- Progression: Volkhov→ Lake Ladoga→ Neva→ Gulf of Finland

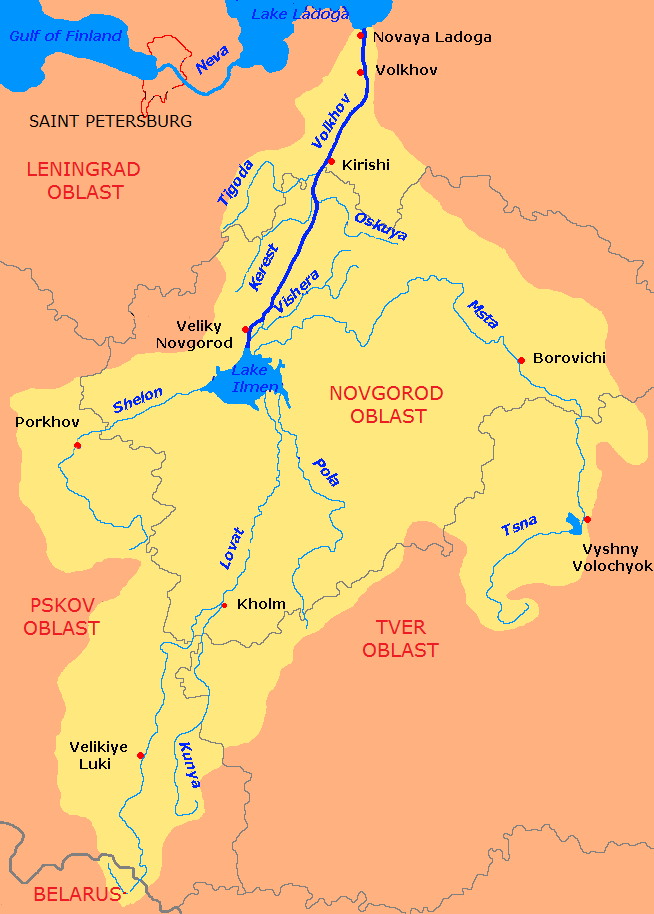
The Volkhov drainage basin. The Tigoda is shown on the map.

The Tigoda (Russian: Тигода) is a river in Novgorodsky and Chudovsky Districts of Novgorod Oblast and Tosnensky and Kirishsky Districts of Leningrad Oblast in Russia. It is a left tributary of the Volkhov. The length of the river is 143 kilometres (89 mi), and the area of its drainage basin is 2,290 square kilometres (880 mi^{2}). The main tributaries are the Ravan (right), the Chagoda (left), and the Kusinka (left). The town of Lyuban is located on the banks of the Tigoda.

The source of the Tigoda is in swamps at the height of 55 metres (180 ft) east of Ogorelye railway station of the railway connecting Veliky Novgorod and Saint Petersburg (at about 59°01′N 30°59′E). The river flows northeast and crosses into Tosnensky District of Leningrad Oblast. North of Lyuban it sharply turns south, accepts the Ravan from the right and crosses into Novgorod Oblast. There, it turns east, crosses into Kirishsky District of Leningrad Oblast and accepts the Chagoda from the left. Further east, a short stretch of the Tigoda marks part of the boundary between Leningrad and Novgorod Oblasts. The mouth of the Tigoda is west of the selo of Chernitsy, at the height level of 17 metres (56 ft).

The drainage basin of the Tigoda includes the southeastern part of Tosnensky District, the western part of Kirishsky District, as well as minor areas in the north of Novgorodsky District, the northwest of Chudovsky District, and the south of Kirovsky District.
