= Rowen (disambiguation) =

Rowen is a village in Conwy, Wales.

Rowen may also refer to:

- Rowen (name), a surname and given name
- Rowen (Elemental Gelade), a character from the manga and anime series Elemental Gelade

== See also ==
- Y Ro Wen, a mountain North Wales
- Rowena (disambiguation)
- Rowan (disambiguation)
