= The Rowans (album) =

Studio album by The Rowans
- Released: May 1975
- Recorded: 1975
- Genre: Country rock; folk rock
- Length: 45:43
- Label: Asylum
- Producer: Peter Rowan/Gordon Anderson/Joe Carroll/Richard Podolor

The Rowans chronology
Rowan Brothers (1972)	The Rowans (1975)	Sibling Rivalry (1976)

The Rowans is the second album by country rock brothers Chris and Lorin Rowan billed this time as The Rowans and joined by their brother Peter Rowan.

== Track listing ==
1. "Take It as It Comes" (Lorin Rowan) – 3:22
2. "Midnight-Moonlight" (Peter Rowan) – 4:19
3. "Me Loving You" (Chris Rowan) – 4:04
4. "Old Silver" (Peter Rowan) – 3:02
5. "Thunder on the Mountain" (Peter Rowan) – 8:25
6. "Beggar in Blue Jeans" (Chris Rowan) – 4:56
7. "Do Right" (Lorin Rowan) – 4:15
8. "Man-Woman" (Chris Rowan) – 5:44
9. "Pieces on the Ground" (Lorin Rowan) – 3:54
10. "Here Today, Gone Tomorrow" (Peter Rowan) – 3:42

== Personnel ==
- Peter Rowan – electric guitar, acoustic guitar, mandolin, mandola, mandocello, tabla, tamboura, vocals
- Chris Rowan – acoustic guitar, electric guitar, flute, keyboards, vocals
- Lorin Rowan – acoustic guitar, electric guitar, piano, sound effects, vocals
- David Hayes – bass
- Russ Kunkel – drums
- Jack Bonus – flute, saxophone

== Production ==
- Producer: The Rowans/Gordon Anderson/Joe Carroll/Richard Podolor
- Recording Engineer: Bill Cooper
- Mixing: Bill Cooper
- Mastering: Doug Sax
- Photography/Design: Norman Seeff
