= Glenn Rowen =

Glenn Davis Rowen (January 22, 1933 - December 20, 1992) was a singer and member of the New York City Opera chorus.

== Biography ==
Glenn Davis Rowen was born in Roswell, New Mexico, and was a graduate of Indiana University.

He joined the United States Army and from 1956 to 1962 served in Germany. After discharge he remained in Germany and sang with the Munich Opera and the Munich Chamber Choir.

Upon returning to the United States, he sang with the New York City Opera chorus, the American Chamber Opera, the Robert Shaw Chorale and the De Paur Chorus.

Rowen died on December 20, 1992, at his home in Manhattan, due to AIDS, according to Susan Woelzl, the New York City Opera's director of publicity.
