= Rowena (disambiguation) =

Rowena is a figure in Geoffrey of Monmouth's Historia Regum Britanniae, the daughter of the Saxon king Hengest and wife of Vortigern.

Rowena can also refer to:

== Places ==
=== United States ===
- Rowena, Georgia, an unincorporated community
- Rowena, Kentucky, an unincorporated community
- Rowena, Minnesota, an unincorporated community
- Rowena, Missouri, an unincorporated community
- Rowena, Oregon, an unincorporated community
- Rowena, South Dakota, an unincorporated community
- Rowena, Texas, an unincorporated community

=== Australia ===
- Rowena, New South Wales, a town

== People ==
- Rowena Bastin Bennett (1896–1981), American writer
- Rowena Cullen (born 1946), New Zealand information services academic
- Rowena Fulham (born 1960), New Zealand footballer
- Rowena Guanzon (born 1957), Filipino lawyer and public servant
- Rowena Hume (1877–1966), Canadian obstetrician
- Rowena Jackson (1926–2024), New Zealand prima ballerina
- Rowena King (born 1970), British actress
- Rowena Meeks Abdy (1887–1945), American painter in Northern California
- Rowena Moore (1910–1998), American union and civic activist
- Rowena Morrill (1944–2021), American science-fiction and fantasy illustrator and painter
- Rowena Sánchez Arrieta (born 1962), Filipina pianist
- Rowena Spencer (1922–2014), American physician
- Rowena Granice Steele (1824–1901), American performer, journalist, publisher
- Rowena Wallace (born 1947), Australian actress, known for her role as Patricia in Sons and Daughters

== Fictional characters ==
- The Lady Rowena, Ivanhoe's love interest in the novel of the same name by Walter Scott
- Rowena Ravenclaw, one of the founders of Hogwarts in the Harry Potter series of books
- Rowena Morgan, a singer in the movie Mr. Holland's Opus
- Rowena (Supernatural), a character in the American television series Supernatural
- Duchess Rowena, the main antagonist in the animated film Barbie in the 12 Dancing Princesses

== Other ==
- Rowena (horse), a British Thoroughbred racehorse

== See also ==
- Rowen (disambiguation)
