= Ravan (river) =

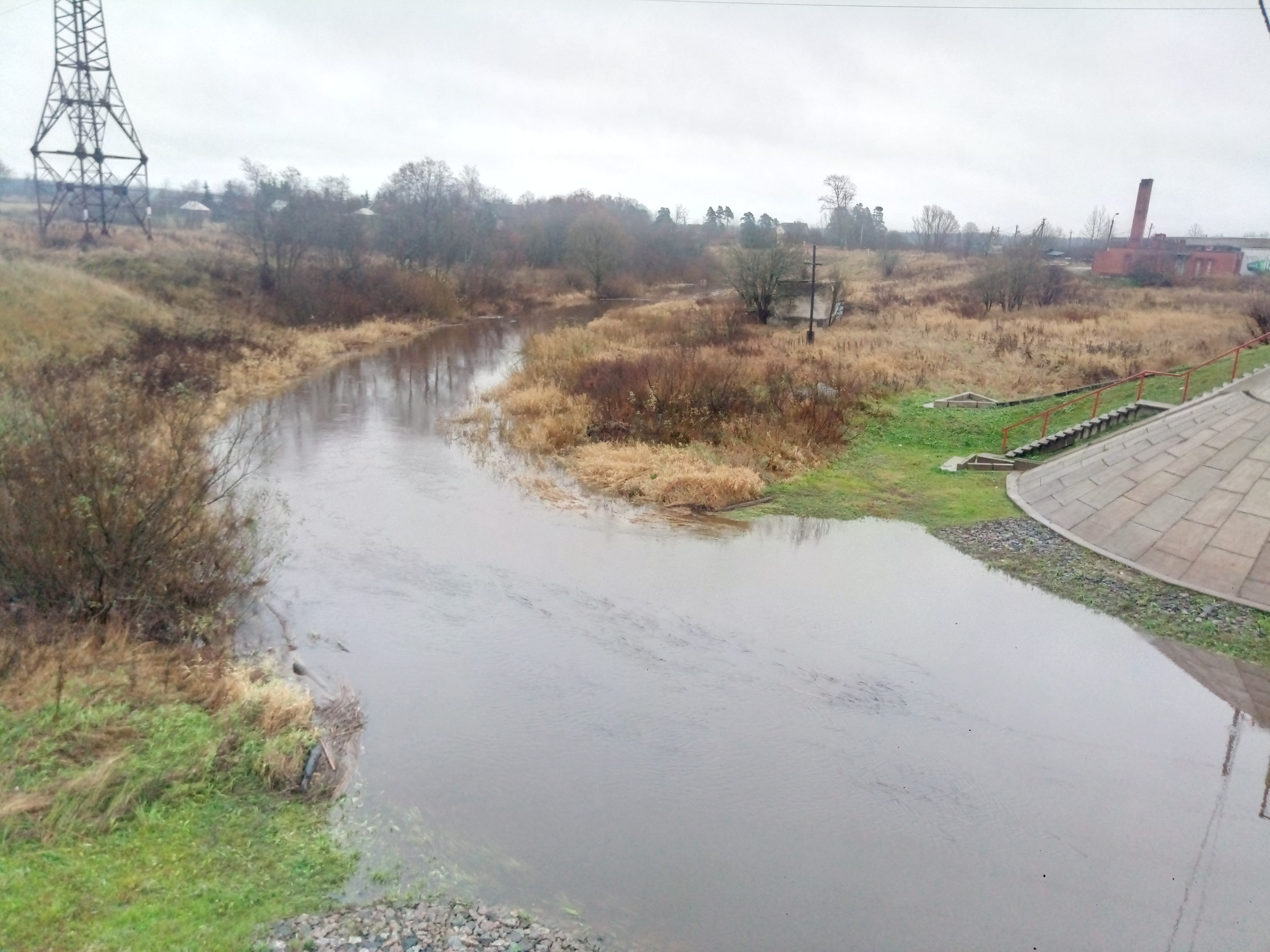
- Native name: Равань (Russian)

Location
- Country: Russia

Physical characteristics
- Mouth: Tigoda
  - coordinates: 59.2785°N 31.5702°E
- Length: 76 km (47 mi)
- Basin size: 533 km^{2} (206 sq mi)

Basin features
- Progression: Tigoda→ Volkhov→ Lake Ladoga→ Neva→ Gulf of Finland

The Ravan (Russian: Равань) is a river in Leningrad Oblast in Russia, a right tributary of the Tigoda. It starts from the Otlizino lake. It is 76 kilometres (47 mi) long, and has a drainage basin of 533 square kilometres (206 sq mi).
