= The Rowans =

American country-rock group

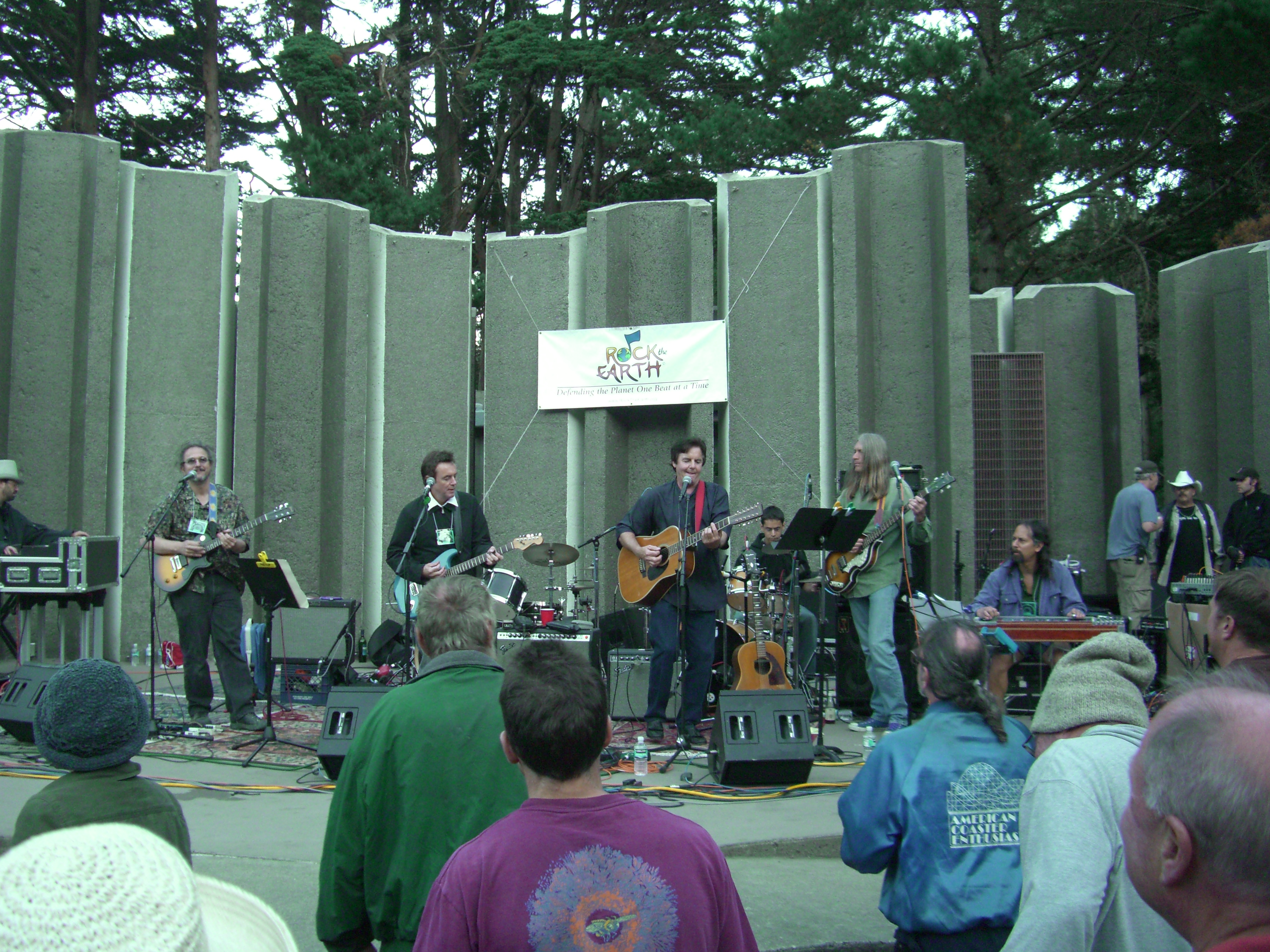
- The Rowans playing in Rubber Souldiers, Jerry Garcia Amphitheater, 2006

Background information
- Origin: Wayland (Boston) Massachusetts, U.S.
- Genres: Country rock; folk rock; progressive bluegrass
- Years active: 1970– present
- Labels: Columbia, Asylum, Appaloosa, BOS
- Members: Chris Rowan; Lorin Rowan
- Past members: Peter Rowan
- Website: www.rowanbrothers.com

The Rowans, also known as The Rowan Brothers, are an American country-rock group, originally formed by the brothers Chris Rowan and Lorin Rowan. They were joined by another brother, Peter Rowan, for their second, third and fourth album. Chris and Lorin were still playing together in 2019 at the Trident in Sausalito, CA.

== Early years ==
Chris and Lorin were raised close to Boston, but in the beginning of 1970, they moved to the West Coast to pursue their music. In 1971, they opened for Grateful Dead as their first gig in San Francisco. Their first album, The Rowan Brothers, was issued on Columbia Records. It was very well critically acclaimed, except by Lester Bangs who savaged the LP in a Creem magazine review. The album included such guests as Jerry Garcia and Bill Kreutzmann of Grateful Dead and was co-produced by David Grisman.

Part of a 1971 rehearsal by the Rowan Brothers at the Fillmore West auditorium is included in the documentary film Fillmore.

== Trio with Peter Rowan ==
The group had problems after the first record because their benefactor, Clive Davis, lost his job at Columbia. They were signed to Asylum Records as The Rowans and issued their next album in 1975, this time joined by their more famous brother, Peter Rowan, who brought in such hits as "Midnight Moonlight" and "Thunder on the Mountain". After releasing three albums as a trio, Peter left the group to pursue bluegrass music.

== Duo again ==
Chris and Lorin have continued playing as a duo, with Peter joining them from time to time. Their project, Now and Then, was issued in 2004 on BOS Music. They also play regularly with David Gans in the Beatles tribute band Rubber Souldiers. In 2002, Chris and Lorin added harmonies on 9 cuts of Bay Area country rocker J.C. Flyer's album, Movin' On.

== Discography ==
=== Chris and Lorin ===
- The Rowan Brothers (1972)
- Livin' the Life (1980)
- Now and Then (2004)

=== Chris, Lorin and Peter ===
- The Rowans (1975)
- Sibling Rivalry (1976)
- Jubilation (1977)
- Crazy People (2002)

=== Peter Rowan & The Rowan Brothers ===
- Tree on a Hill (1993)
