= Peter Rowan =

American bluegrass musician (born 1942)

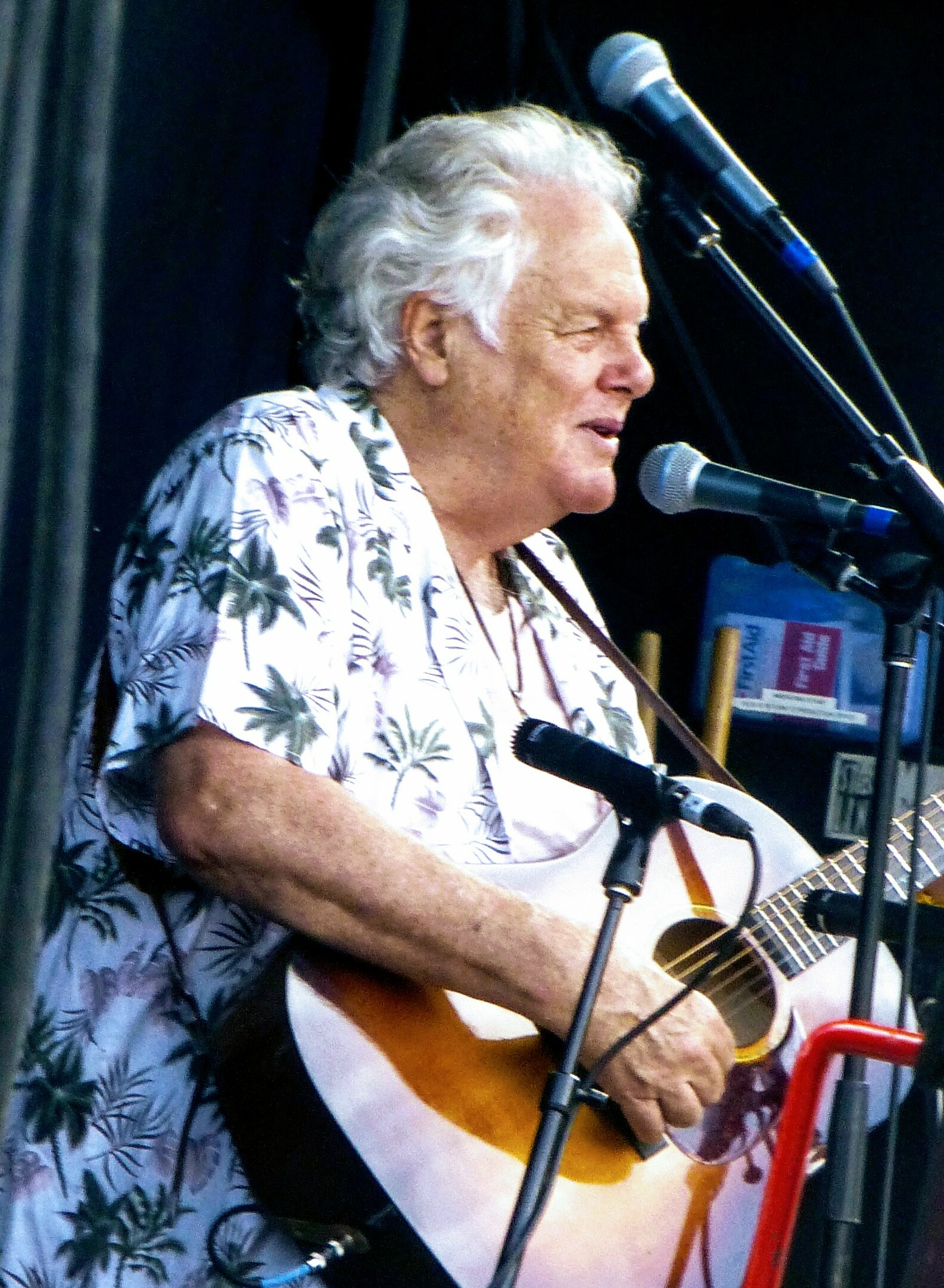
- Peter on the Americana Stage at MerleFest in 2024

Background information
- Born: July 4, 1942 (age 83); Wayland, Massachusetts U.S.
- Genres: Bluegrass; progressive bluegrass; folk; country; psychedelic rock; Tex-Mex
- Occupations: Musician, singer-songwriter, vocalist, yodeler
- Instruments: Guitar, mandolin, fiddle, banjo, dobro, piano
- Years active: 1956–present
- Labels: Rounder, Flying Fish, Sugar Hill, Compass, Omnivore
- Website: peter-rowan.com

Peter Rowan (born July 4, 1942) is an American bluegrass musician and composer. He plays guitar, fiddle, dobro, banjo, bass, piano and mandolin. He has a wide vocal range and yodels. He was inducted into the International Bluegrass Music Hall of Fame in 2022.

== Biography ==
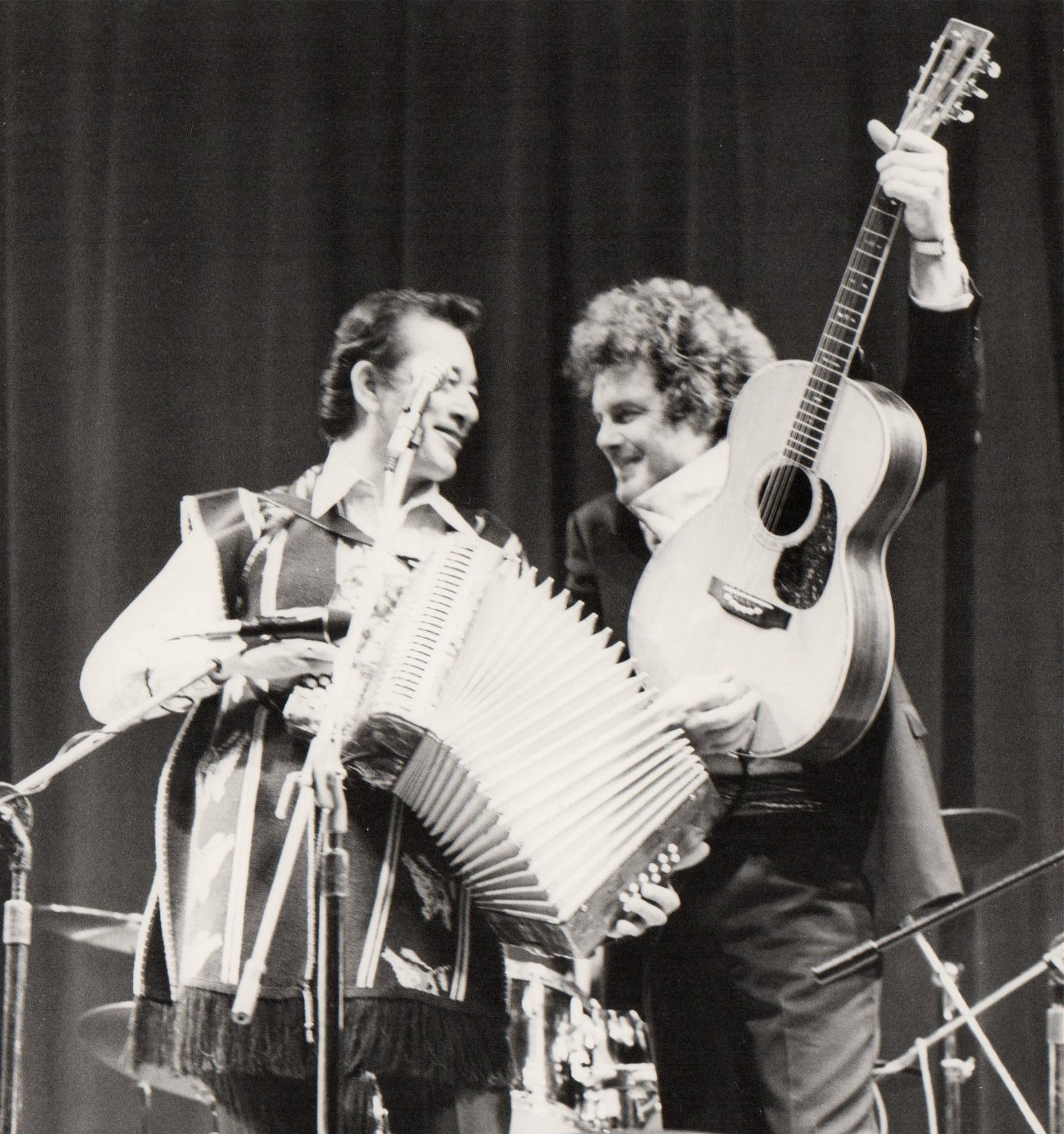
Rowan (right) with Flaco Jiménez on stage at Farnham, U.K., 1985

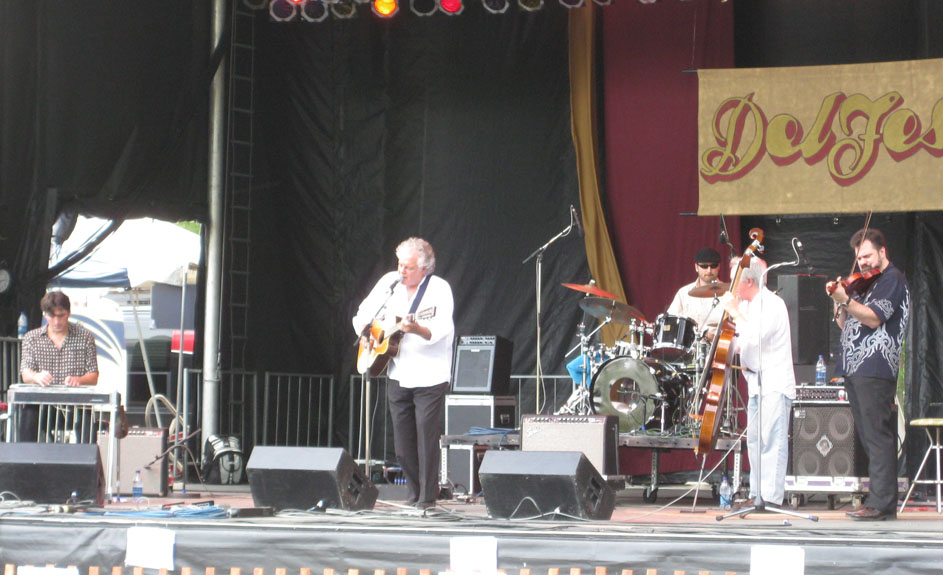
Rowan and the Free Mexican Airforce at DelFest 2009

Rowan was born in Wayland, Massachusetts to a musical family. From an early age, he had an interest in music and learned to play the guitar from his uncle. He was influenced by musicians such as the Lilly Brothers and Tex Logan at the Hillbilly Ranch, and formed his first rockabilly band the Cupids 1956.

Influenced by the blues musician Eric Von Schmidt, Rowan traded his electric guitar for an acoustic and began to play the blues. He was also influenced by the folk sound of Joan Baez. In college, he discovered bluegrass after hearing The Country Gentlemen and The Stanley Brothers. He soon discovered the music of Bill Monroe, and with some help from banjo player Bill Keith, he was invited to Nashville to audition for Monroe. Accompanied by Keith, Rowan went to Nashville and was hired in 1964 as songwriter, rhythm guitarist and lead vocalist of Monroe's Bluegrass Boys. His recording debut as a "bluegrass boy" took place on October 14, 1966, and he recorded a total of fourteen songs with Monroe, including the classic "Walls of Time" co-written with Monroe, before his tenure ended in the spring of 1967.

Rowan teamed up with David Grisman in 1967 forming the band Earth Opera which frequently opened for The Doors. In 1969, Rowan joined Seatrain. In 1973, Rowan, together with Richard Greene, Grisman, Bill Keith, and Clarence White, formed the bluegrass band Muleskinner. The band released one studio album.

The same year (1973), Rowan and Grisman formed Old & In the Way with Greene, Jerry Garcia, and John Kahn. He wrote the song "Panama Red" that year. Greene was later replaced by Vassar Clements. Old & In the Way disbanded in 1974; shortly thereafter, Rowan joined The Rowans, a reconstituted version of his brothers' band (The Rowan Brothers, who had recorded and toured since 1970) for three years. For a time, he was touring with Greene in Japan and playing clubs with fiddler Tex Logan. He also formed the Green Grass Gringos, as well as The Wild Stallions with Roger Mason and Jon Sholle.

Rowan joined The Mother Bay State Entertainers in 1963 and played mandolin on the three tracks the group contributed to the 1965 various artist record The String Band Project. He has recorded and performed with his brothers, Lorin and Chris, at various times, starting in 1972. He has composed songs performed by New Riders of the Purple Sage, including "Panama Red", "Midnight Moonlight" and "Lonesome L.A. Cowboy".

Rowan also features on the 1987 album In No Sense? Nonsense! by the UK band Art of Noise. He appears as "The Voice" (yodel) on "One Earth", the last song of the album.

Rowan collaborated with his daughter, Amanda Rowan, to write the song "On the Wings of Horses", which was recorded on Rowan's 1990 album Dustbowl Children and later recorded by Emmylou Harris on the 1992 Disney album Country Music for Kids. Rowan released Quartet (2007), the second collaboration with guitarist and bluegrass musician Tony Rice. Rowan contributed to the 2011 bluegrass tribute album to the British progressive rock band the Moody Blues, entitled Moody Bluegrass TWO...Much Love, singing lead vocal on Mike Pinder's song "Dawn Is a Feeling".

His more recent releases are The Old School (2013) on Compass Records, Peter Rowan's Twang n Groove Vol. 1 on There Records, Dharma Blues (2014) on Omnivore Recordings, My Aloha! (2017) also on Omnivore Recordings, and Carter Stanley's Eyes (2018) on Rebel Records.

In 1997 Rowan received a Grammy Award for his contributions to the bluegrass compilation True Life Blues: The Songs of Bill Monroe. The album won for Best Bluegrass Album that year. He has also received six Grammy nominations throughout his career.

Rowan received the Bluegrass Star Award, presented by the Bluegrass Heritage Foundation of Dallas, Texas, on October 20, 2012. The award is bestowed upon bluegrass artists who do an exemplary job of advancing traditional bluegrass music and bringing it to new audiences while preserving its character and heritage.

Rowan is a Buddhist.

== Various acts ==
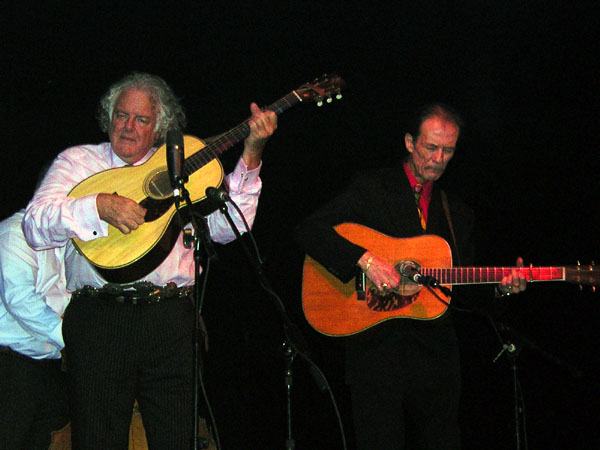
Rowan (left) performing with Tony Rice in 2008

=== Peter Rowan Bluegrass Band ===
Rowan's career in bluegrass started in 1964 as part of Monroe's Blue Grass Boys. Bluegrass musician Bill Monroe thought that Rowan sounded like himself. “When the two harmonized together, they were said to reach ‘heavenly heights.’" Rowan co-wrote ‘Walls Of Time’ with Monroe, which has since become a bluegrass standard.

Peter Rowan's Bluegrass Band consists of Blaine Sprouse on fiddle, Christopher Henry on mandolin, Paul Knight on bass, Patrick Sauber on banjo, Jamie Oldaker on drums. The band plays Rowan's original tunes along with Bill Monroe and Carter Family classics.

=== Peter Rowan's Big Twang Theory ===
Rowan leads Big Twang Theory with musicians Mike Witcher on dobro, Paul Knight on bass, Nina Gerber on electric guitar, and Rowan's son Michael Carter Rowan on guitar and vocals. Drummers Larry Attamanuik and Ken Owen and banjo player Jeff Mosier also appear with Rowan's Big Twang Theory when their schedules permit. "I have always wanted a band that was rooted in bluegrass, but could add the twang of Hank Williams, Carl Perkins and Buddy Holly. They all absorbed Bill Monroe's bluegrass into honky-tonk and rockabilly. I grew up dancing to that music.” – Peter Rowan.

=== Peter Rowan's Twang an' Groove ===
Twang an' Groove is a blend of rhythm and blues, reggae, and bluegrass music. The band features Rowan on electric guitar and vocals, Blaine Sprouse on fiddle, Mike Morgan on bass, and drummer, Jamie Oldaker.

=== Peter Rowan & Crucial Reggae ===
This outfit is Rowan's nod to reggae music. Rowan's diversity in musical ability ventures beyond his bluegrass roots with Crucial Reggae to bring some of Rowan's most soulful original music to light. He is accompanied by reggae greats Tony Chin and Fully Fullwood, on guitar and bass respectively. Crucial Reggae is sometimes accompanied by other musicians to form an either five or six-piece band. They become a nine-piece band when they are joined by the Burning Spear horn section.

=== The Free Mexican Airforce ===
The Free Mexican Airforce features Rowan and some of his most beloved songs: "Come Back to Old Santa Fe", "Ride the Wild Mustang", "Midnight Moonlight", and "Free Mexican Airforce". This four-piece often features Cindy Cashdollar on pedal steel guitar along with players on bass and drums.
