= Steve Martin filmography =

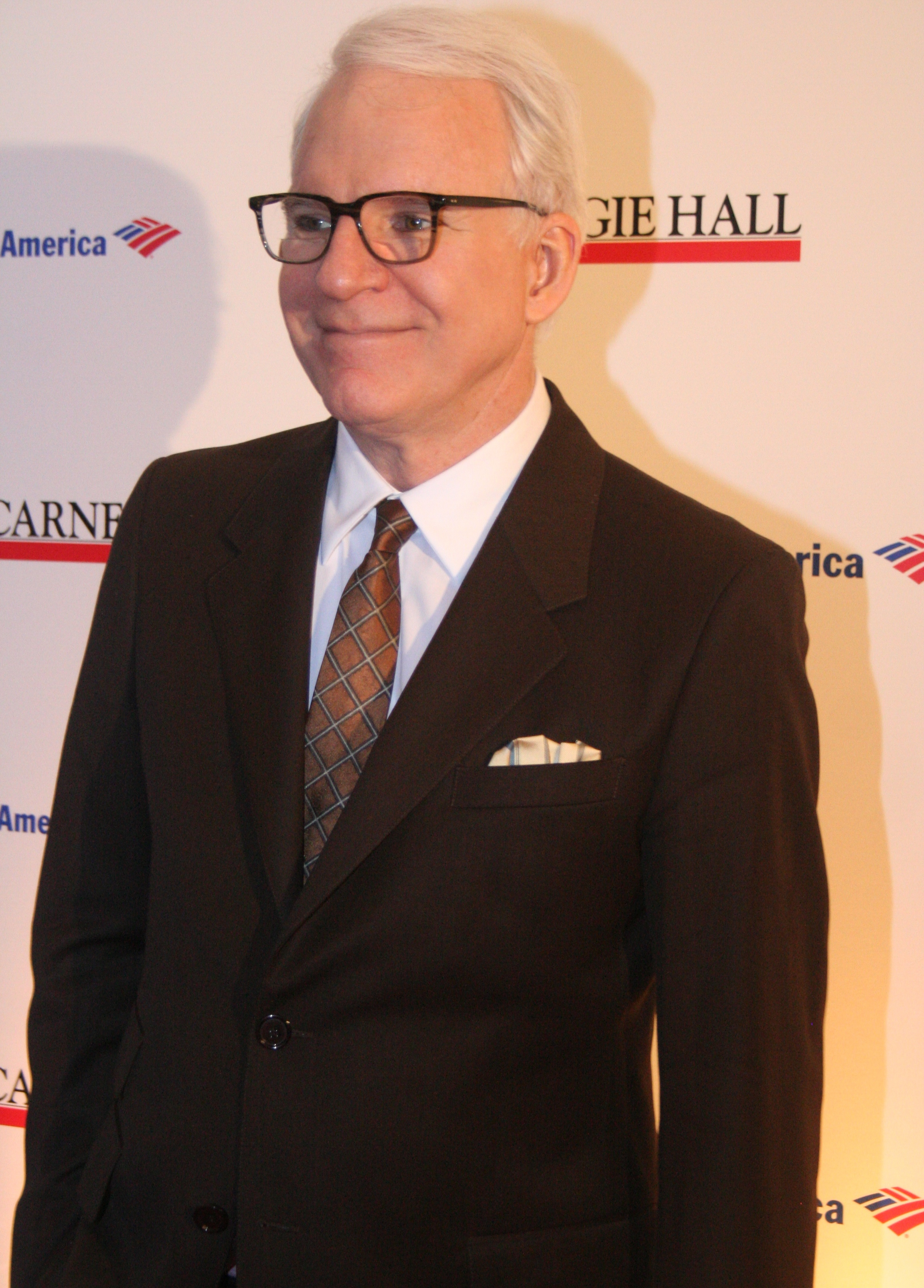
Martin at the 120th Anniversary of Carnegie Hall in New York City in April 2011

Steve Martin starred in such films as The Jerk (1979), Dead Men Don't Wear Plaid (1982), The Man with Two Brains (1983), All of Me (1984), Three Amigos (1986), Roxanne (1987), Planes, Trains and Automobiles (1987), Dirty Rotten Scoundrels (1988), Parenthood (1989), Father of the Bride (1991), Cheaper by the Dozen (2003), and The Pink Panther (2006). Martin has also hosted Saturday Night Live 16 times.

Martin started his career as a writer for the television series Smothers Brothers Comedy Hour from 1968 to 1969. He has since portrayed numerous roles on The Sonny & Cher Comedy Hour (1971–1972), Saturday Night Live (1976–2022), and The Muppet Show (1977). Martin has also hosted the Academy Awards in 2001, 2003 and in 2010 alongside Alec Baldwin. He has guest starred on 30 Rock (2008) earning a Primetime Emmy Award for Outstanding Guest Actor in a Comedy Series nomination. Since 2021 he has starred in the Hulu mystery-comedy series Only Murders in the Building alongside Martin Short and Selena Gomez.

He has also worked on Broadway as a playwright and composer. He wrote the 2014 musical Bright Star and the 2016 comedy Meteor Shower.

== Film ==
Year	Title	Role	Notes
1972	Another Nice Mess	Hippy	
1977	The Absent-Minded Waiter	Steven, the Waiter	Short film; Also writer
1978	Sgt. Pepper's Lonely Hearts Club Band	Dr. Maxwell Edison	
1979	The Muppet Movie	Insolent Waiter	
1979	The Kids Are Alright	Himself	Documentary
1979	The Jerk	Navin R. Johnson	Also writer
1981	Pennies from Heaven	Arthur	
1982	Dead Men Don't Wear Plaid	Rigby Reardon	Also writer
1983	The Man with Two Brains	Dr. Michael Hfuhruhurr	Also writer
1984	The Lonely Guy	Larry Hubbard	
1984	All of Me	Roger Cobb	
1985	Movers & Shakers	Fabio Longio	Cameo
1986	¡Three Amigos!	Lucky Day	Also writer and executive producer
1986	Little Shop of Horrors	Orin Scrivello, DDS	
1987	Roxanne	C. D. Bales	Also writer and executive producer
1987	Planes, Trains and Automobiles	Neal Page	
1988	Dirty Rotten Scoundrels	Freddy Benson	
1989	Parenthood	Gil Buckman	
1990	My Blue Heaven	Vinnie Antonelli	
1991	L.A. Story	Harris K. Telemacher	Also writer and executive producer
1991	Father of the Bride	George Banks	
1991	Grand Canyon	Davis	
1992	Housesitter	Newton Davis	
1992	Leap of Faith	Jonas Nightengale	
1994	A Simple Twist of Fate	Michael McCann	Also writer and executive producer
1994	Mixed Nuts	Philip	
1995	Father of the Bride Part II	George Banks	
1996	Sgt. Bilko	Master Sergeant Ernest G. Bilko	
1997	The Spanish Prisoner	Jimmy Dell	
1998	The Prince of Egypt	Hotep	Voice
1999	The Out-of-Towners	Henry Clark	
1999	Bowfinger	Robert "Bobby" K. Bowfinger	Also writer
1999	The Venice Project	Himself	Uncredited cameo
1999	Fantasia 2000	Himself (Introductory host)	Segment: "Pines of Rome"
2000	Joe Gould's Secret	Charlie Duell	Cameo
2001	Novocaine	Frank Sangster	
2003	Bringing Down the House	Peter Sanderson	
2003	Looney Tunes: Back in Action	Mr. Chairman	
2003	Cheaper by the Dozen	Tom Baker	
2004	Jiminy Glick in Lalawood	Himself	Cameo
2005	Shopgirl	Ray Porter	Also writer and producer
2005	Cheaper by the Dozen 2	Tom Baker	
2005	Disneyland: The First 50 Magical Years	Himself (host)	Short documentary
2006	The Pink Panther	Inspector Clouseau	Also writer
2008	Baby Mama	Barry	
2008	Traitor	—N/a	Story writer and producer
2009	The Pink Panther 2	Inspector Clouseau	Also writer
2009	It's Complicated	Adam Schaffer	
2011	The Big Year	Stu Preissler	
2015	Home	Captain Smek	Voice
2015	Love the Coopers	Narrator/Rags the Dog	Voice
2016	Billy Lynn's Long Halftime Walk	Norm Oglesby	
2017	The American Epic Sessions	Himself	Documentary
2020	Cruel Shoes	Narrator	Short film; Also writer
2020	Father of the Bride Part 3(ish)	George Banks	Short film
2024	Steve! (Martin): A Documentary in 2 Pieces	Himself	Documentary
2025	John Candy: I Like Me	Himself	Documentary
2026	Lorne	Himself	Documentary
2026	Marty, Life Is Short	Himself	Documentary

== Television ==
Year	Title	Role	Notes
1966	Dusty's Attic	Tex	
1967	Off to See the Wizard	Simon the Pieman	Episode: "Who's Afraid of Mother Goose?"
1968–1969	The Smothers Brothers Comedy Hour	Himself / Medieval King	5 episodes
1970	The Ray Stevens Show	Himself	7 episodes
1971–1972	The Sonny & Cher Comedy Hour	Various characters	13 episodes
1973	The Midnight Special	Himself	3 episodes
1974	The Funnier Side of Eastern Canada	Himself	Stand-up special
1976	Doc	Brian Bogert	Episode: "My Son, the Father"
1976	Steve Martin: On Location with Steve Martin	Himself	Stand-up special
1976–2022	Saturday Night Live	Himself (host)	16 episodes
1977	The Muppet Show	Himself	Episode: "Steve Martin"
1978	The Carol Burnett Show	Himself	Episode: "11.21"
1978	Steve Martin: A Wild and Crazy Guy	Himself	Stand-up special
1979	Steve Martin: Homage to Steve	Himself	Stand-up special
1980	Steve Martin: Comedy Is Not Pretty	Himself	TV special
1980	All Commercials... A Steve Martin Special	Himself	TV special
1981	Steve Martin's Best Show Ever	Himself	TV special
1982	Twilight Theater	Various characters	TV special
1984	Domestic Life	—N/a	10 episodes; co-creator and executive producer
1985	George Burns Comedy Week	—N/a	13 episodes; executive producer, co-story (2 episodes), director (episode "The Couch")
1986	Leo & Liz in Beverly Hills	—N/a	6 episodes; co-creator, executive producer, co-story & director (episode "The A-List")
1987	The Tracey Ullman Show	Rusty DeClure	Episode "2.1"
1993	And the Band Played On	The Brother	Television film; cameo
1998	The Simpsons	Ray Patterson (voice)	Episode: "Trash of the Titans"
2001	73rd Academy Awards	Himself (host)	TV special
2003	75th Academy Awards	Himself (host)	TV special
2008	30 Rock	Gavin Volure	Episode: "Gavin Volure"
2010	82nd Academy Awards	Himself (co-host)	TV special
2016	Maya & Marty	Himself	3 episodes
2018	An Evening You Will Forget for the Rest of Your Life	Himself	Stand-up special
2021–present	Only Murders in the Building	Charles-Haden Savage	Also co-creator, co-writer (1 episode), and executive producer
2025	Saturday Night Live 50th Anniversary Special	Himself (opening monologue)	TV special
2027	Oswald	TBA	Post-production

== Theatre ==
Year	Title	Notes	Venue	Refs.
1988	Waiting for Godot	Vladimir	Mitzi Newhouse Theater, Lincoln Center	
1993	Picasso at the Lapin Agile	Playwright	Steppenwolf Theatre Company	
2002	The Elephant Man	Producer	Royale Theatre, Broadway	
2002	Short Talks on the Universe	Writer - segment: 3 a.m.	Eugene O'Neill Theatre, Broadway	
2014	Bright Star	Playwright/composer	Cort Theatre, Broadway	
2016	Meteor Shower	Playwright	Booth Theatre, Broadway	
2016	Oh, Hello on Broadway	Special Guest - Himself	Lyceum Theatre, Broadway	
2023	Gutenberg! The Musical!	Producer (guest cameo)	James Earl Jones Theatre, Broadway	

== See also ==
- List of awards and nominations received by Steve Martin
