= Michael Elias =

American writer, film director and producer

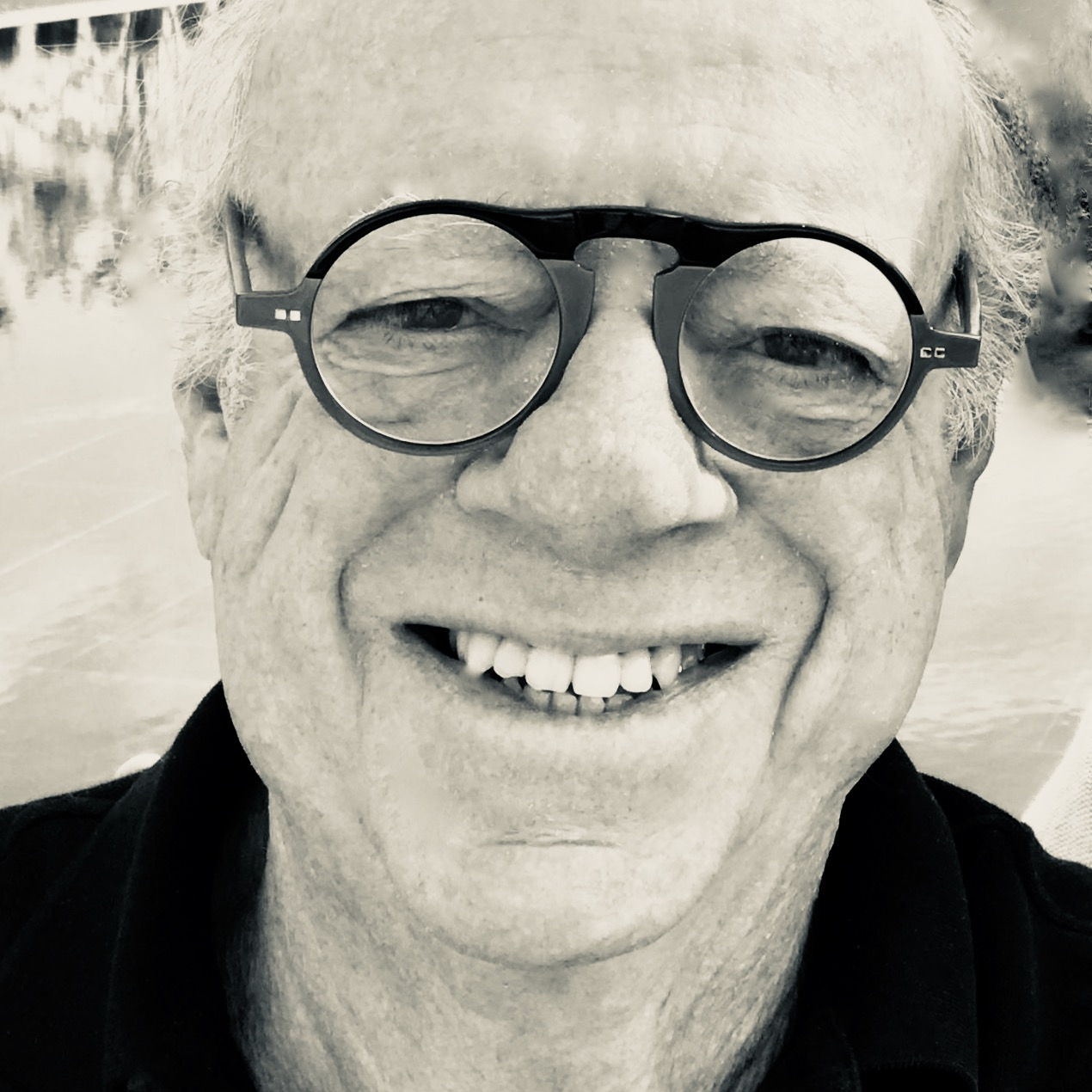
- Elias in 2018
- Born: Michael Herman Elias; September 20, 1940 (age 85); Woodbourne, New York, U.S.
- Occupations: Writer, producer, director
- Years active: 1965–present
- Known for: The Jerk, Lush Life, Head of the Class
- Spouse(s): Caroline Bielefelt (m. 1963 div. 1973), Laraine Mestman (m. 1991 div. 2001), Bianca Roberts (m. 2013)
- Children: 4

Michael Herman Elias (born September 20, 1940) is an American writer, film director and producer.

== Early and private life ==
Elias was born in upstate New York. He inherited his left-wing politics from his parents. His father was a doctor, the son of immigrants to the US from Hungary who spent some time in Spain in the 1930s during the Spanish Civil War. His mother was a librarian and trade union activist, whose parents came to the US from Russia. The family moved to Woodstock in the early 1960s. Elias attended Woodbourne Elementary School, Fallsburg High Central Junior and Senior High School. From there he went to St. John's College in Annapolis, Maryland, graduating in 1962 with a degree in mathematics and philosophy. He was President of The Rogers Albritton Film Club and acted in The King William Players productions of Shakespeare, Brecht, and Beckett. Elias is the brother of Ruth Rogers (Lady Rogers) who is married to British born architect Richard Rogers (Lord Rogers) and Susan Elias, an artist living in Berlin who is married to artist Reinhard Voigt.

Elias has been married three times: Caroline Bielefelt 1963–1974, Laraine Mestman 1991–2001, and Bianca Roberts former executive director of the Mona Bismarck American Center in Paris. Elias has one son with Laraine Mestman, Frederick Mestman, and three step-sons: Ernie Klein, Siggy Bodolai, and James Bulliard.

== Acting career ==
After college Elias went to New York, studied with Bill Hickey, Uta Hagen at HB Studio and Lee Strasberg at The Actors Studio. At the same time Elias joined The Living Theatre where he appeared on stage in Kenneth Brown's The Brig 1963 as well as the 1964 film by Jonas Mekas. Elias traveled to London with The Living Theatre for a production of The Brig at the Mermaid Theatre, then returned to New York where he appeared in plays at the Judson Poets Theatre by Al Carmines, Rochelle Owens, and Maria Irene Fornes. In 1963, Elias, along with other members of the cast were arrested when Federal Marshals seized the theatre.

In the late 1960s, Elias joined Frank Shaw and formed the comedy team of Elias and Shaw. They made their first appearance on The Tonight Show in 1967, then played New York nightclubs The Bitter End, Upstairs at the Downstairs, Bon Soir, The Village Gate. After another appearance on The Tonight Show they were seen by Ernest Chambers, a television producer who hired them to come to Hollywood as writers. They gave up the act and wrote for Leslie Uggams, Glen Campbell, and Bill Cosby. They also wrote the screenplay for the film The Frisco Kid which starred Gene Wilder and Harrison Ford.

== Film and television ==
In 1971, Elias and Steve Martin were both staff writers on The Pat Paulsen Half A Comedy Show. When Martin decided to devote himself to stand-up he invited Elias to write material for him. This began a long collaboration that also included Martin's comedy albums and two of his network TV specials, A Wild and Crazy Guy (1978) and Comedy Is Not Pretty! (1980), and the screenplay for The Jerk (1979).

In 1978, Elias partnered with Rich Eustis and began a 20-year collaboration in which they created and produced the hit sitcom Head of the Class starring Howard Hesseman about gifted but socially inept high school students. It ran for five seasons on ABC. In the last year Howard Hesseman was replaced by the Scottish comedian Billy Connolly. The Hollywood Reporter confirmed in 2019 that a reboot is planned for HBO Max. Two of the 115 episodes of Head of The Class were filmed in the USSR ("Mission to Moscow Pts. 1 & 2"). It was the first American television show to be shot in Moscow. In addition, Elias and Eustis wrote screenplays for Young Doctors in Love, Serial, North Dallas, Back to School and other television series including Eye to Eye, Tall Hopes, and numerous pilots for Warner Brothers.

In 1992, Elias and Eustis amicably dissolved their partnership. Elias went on to write and direct the award-winning Showtime movie Lush Life with Forest Whitaker and Jeff Goldblum. He was nominated for best director at the CableACE Awards.

In 2007, Paul Mazursky directed Elias's semi-autobiographical play The Catskill Sonata. The LA Weekly named it one of the best ten plays of the year.

== Novels ==
Elias' has written the novel The Last Conquistador published in 2013 by Open Road Media. In 2020, Elias published a novel You Can Go Home Now with HarperCollins and in 2026 his novel Bender's L.A. was published by Sticking Place Books.

== Lawsuit ==
In July 2011, Michael Elias and Rich Eustis filed a lawsuit against Creative Artists Agency (CAA), the talent agency which had represented them from the 1970s until 1995. The suit claimed that in addition to the agency's package fee of US$3.2 million for Head of the Class, the agency had an undisclosed "side deal" with Warner Bros. for 10% of profits which was paid before and cut into the creators' profits. According to the suit, CAA allegedly received US$9 million from this deal. CAA denied the allegations.

== Television ==
Year	Film	Credit	Notes
1970	Pat Paulsen's Half a Comedy Hour	Writer, Story Editor	
1969–1971	The Bill Cosby Show	Writer	
1970–1971	The Glen Campbell Goodtime Hour	Writer	
1972	All's Fair	Writer, Co-producer	
1973–1974	The New Dick Van Dyke Show	Writer, producer	
1975	Black Bart based on Blazing Saddles	Writer, producer	Developed for television, Co- written with Frank Shaw
1978	Steve Martin: A Wild and Crazy Guy	Writer	Co-written with Jack Handey, Steve Martin and Alan Metter
1979	Co-Ed Fever	Created by	
1980	Comedy is Not Pretty	Writer	Co-written with Jack Handey, Steve Martin, Carmen Finestra, Robert Garland and Connie Turner
1986–1991	Head of the Class	Written by, Co-Creator, Executive Producer with Rich Eustis	
1992	Billy	Written by, Co-Creator, Executive Producer with Rich Eustis	
1993	Tall Hopes	Written by, Co-Creator, Executive Producer with Rich Eustis	
2010	The Best Friend	Executive producer	

== Filmography ==
Year	Film	Credit	Notes
1972	Trick Baby	Writer	Written as A. Neuberg, with T. Raewin (Uncredited)
1979	The Jerk	Screenplay	Screenplay co-written with Steve Martin and Carl Gottlieb
1979	The Frisco Kid	Writer	Co-written with Frank Shaw
1980	Serial	Writer	Co-written with Rich Eustis
1982	Young Doctors in Love	Writer	Co-written with Rich Eustis
1988	Envoyez Les Violons	Story Written with Ève Babitz	Screenplay co-written with Roger Andrieux
1993	Lush Life	Writer, director	Nominated CableACE Award
1998	No Laughing Matter	Writer, director	

== Theatre ==
Year	Play	Credit	Notes
2007	Catskill Sonata (2007)	Playwright	Directed by Paul Mazursky
