= The Pleasure of My Company =

2003 novel by Steve Martin

- Author: Steve Martin
- Cover artist: Doyle Partners
- Language: English
- Publisher: Hyperion
- Publication date: October 1, 2003
- Publication place: United States
- English publication date: 2003
- Media type: Print (hardback & paperback)
- Pages: 176 pp
- ISBN: 0-7868-6921-6
- OCLC: 51983421
- Dewey Decimal: 813/.54 21
- LC Class: PS3563.A7293 P57 2003
- Preceded by: Shopgirl (2001)
- Followed by: Born Standing Up (2007)

The Pleasure of My Company is a 2003 novel by Steve Martin, which tells the story of the life of Daniel Pecan Cambridge, an introverted young man with obsessive–compulsive disorder (OCD). The novel revolves around Daniel, his obsessions, and his interactions with the world around his home in Santa Monica, California.

== Characters ==
Daniel Pecan Cambridge is the book's protagonist. Daniel has obsessive–compulsive disorder, and thus acts out compulsive behaviors such as stepping over cracks in the sidewalk.

Elizabeth Warner is a real estate agent whom Daniel falls in love with from afar.

Zandy is a pharmacist at the local Rite Aid whom Daniel develops a crush on before he meets her.

Daniel's grandmother is a kind, wealthy woman who sends him letters and checks throughout the novel.

Philipa is an intelligent and attractive actress who lives upstairs from Daniel with her boyfriend Brian and her dog Tiger. She is one of Daniel's closest friends.

Brian is Philipa's athletic boyfriend. Daniel is indifferent to him at first, but eventually they become friends.

Clarissa a college student who is studying to become a psychologist. She meets with Daniel twice a week to evaluate him, but their relationship becomes more personal.

== Reception ==
The Pleasure of My Company received positive reviews from critics, with both Kirkus Reviews and Publishers Weekly publishing starred reviews. The former described the novella as having strong humor and emotion, while the latter praised the plot and pacing.
