= Pure Drivel =

- First edition
- Author: Steve Martin
- Language: English
- Genre: Short Stories
- Publisher: Hyperion
- Publication date: September 16, 1998
- Publication place: United States
- Media type: Print (hardback & paperback)
- Pages: 112 pp
- ISBN: 0-7868-6467-2
- OCLC: 39339256
- Dewey Decimal: 814/.54 21
- LC Class: PS3563.A7293 P87 1998
- Preceded by: Picasso at the Lapin Agile (1996)
- Followed by: Shopgirl (2000)

Pure Drivel is a collection of stories by Steve Martin, published in 1998, many of which first appeared in The New Yorker.

Stories	Original Publication	Publication Date
"A Public Apology"	The New Yorker	November 17, 1997
"Writing Is Easy!"	The New Yorker	June 24, 1996
"Yes, In My Own Backyard"	The New Yorker	April 22, 1996
"Changes in the Memory After Fifty"	The New Yorker	January 19, 1998
"Mars Probe Finds Kitten"	The New York Times	July 10, 1997
"Dear Amanda"	The New Yorker	February 16, 1998
"Times Roman Font Announces Shortage of Periods"	The New Yorker	June 9, 1997
"Schrödinger's Cat"		
"Taping My Friends"	The New Yorker	February 23, 1998
"The Nature of Matter and Its Antecedents"	The New York Times	March 2, 1997
"The Sledgehammer: How It Works"	The New Yorker	July 27, 1998
"The Paparazzi of Plato"	The New Yorker	September 22, 1997
"Side Effects"	The New Yorker	April 13, 1998
"Artist Lost to Zoloft"		
"How I Joined Mensa"	The New Yorker	July 21, 1997
"Michael Jackson's Old Face"		
"In Search of the Wily Filipino"	The New Yorker	July 6, 1998
"Bad Dog"		
"Hissy Fit"		
"Drivel"	The New Yorker	December 22, 1997
"I Love Loosely"		
"Lolita At Fifty"		
"The Hundred Greatest Books That I've Read"	The New Yorker	
"Closure"	The New Yorker	February 15, 1999
"The Y3K Bug"	The New Yorker	
"A Word from the Words"		
