= The Alphabet from A to Y with Bonus Letter Z! =

Book by Steve Martin

The Alphabet From A to Y with Bonus Letter Z!
- The front cover art for The Alphabet from A to Y With Bonus Letter Z!
- Author: Steve Martin
- Illustrator: Roz Chast
- Language: English
- Genre: Children's
- Publisher: Doubleday
- Publication date: October 23, 2007
- Publication place: United States
- Media type: Print (hardcover)

The Alphabet From A to Y with Bonus Letter Z! is a children's book aimed at infants and preschoolers containing couplets written by comedian, writer, and humorist Steve Martin, with illustrations by New Yorker cartoonist Roz Chast.

The book, published by Doubleday, was released in October 2007.
