= Comedy Is Not Pretty! =

Live album by Steve Martin
- Released: 1979
- Recorded: 1979
- Venue: The Boarding House, San Francisco, California
- Genre: Comedy
- Length: 33:53
- Label: Warner Bros.
- Producer: William E. McEuen

Steve Martin chronology
A Wild and Crazy Guy (1978)	Comedy Is Not Pretty! (1979)	The Steve Martin Brothers (1981)

Professional ratings
Review scores
Source	Rating
Allmusic	4/5 stars

Comedy Is Not Pretty! (1979) is an album by the American comedian Steve Martin. It was recorded at The Boarding House in San Francisco, California, where his previous two albums were also recorded.

When released, the album was not as well-received as his previous two albums (Let's Get Small, A Wild and Crazy Guy). However, at this point in his career, Martin was in the midst of writing the screenplay for his first starring role in the motion picture, The Jerk. As a result, he spent less of his time working on material for his stand-up career and the album was his first to not make the Top 10 on Billboard's Pop Albums Chart, peaking only at #25. The album was also his first to not go Platinum; it was, however, certified Gold.

One track was simply a humorous reading of a short story from his book Cruel Shoes accompanied by a banjo solo in the background. The track "Drop Thumb Medley" is an instrumental banjo performance.

This album was nominated for a Grammy Award for Best Comedy Album.

Martin also starred in a television special of the same name for NBC in 1980.

== Track listing ==
All tracks by Steve Martin

1. "Born to Be Wild" (Mars Bonfire, Martin) – 5:49
2. "The All Being" – 1:24
3. "McDonald's/Men's Underwear" – 3:11
4. "Drop Thumb Medley" – 2:10
5. "Googlephonics" – 3:06
6. "Hostages" – 1:13
7. "Cruel Shoes" – 2:17
8. "Comedy Is Not Pretty" – 3:26
9. "How to Meet a Girl" – 3:47
10. "Rubberhead" – 0:56
11. "Jackie O. and Farrah F." – 3:39
12. "You Can Be a Millionaire" – 2:55

== Personnel ==
- William R. Eastabrook – Photography
- Pat Kraus – Digital Mastering
- Steve Martin – Composer
- William McEuen – Producer, Engineer, Artwork, Editing, Art Direction, Design
- Norman Seeff – Photography
- Geoff Sykes – Mastering
- Dean Torrence – Graphic Design
