= The Steve Martin Brothers =

Live album by Steve Martin
- Released: 1981
- Recorded: 1980, Las Vegas, Hollywood
- Genre: Comedy
- Length: 33:53
- Label: Warner Bros.
- Producer: William E. McEuen

Steve Martin chronology
Comedy Is Not Pretty! (1979)	The Steve Martin Brothers (1981)	The Crow: New Songs for the 5-String Banjo (2009)

Professional ratings
Review scores
Source	Rating
AllMusic	2.5/5 stars

Back cover of The Steve Martin Brothers

The Steve Martin Brothers, released on LP in 1981, is a comedy album by the American entertainer Steve Martin. The album, the last stand-up comedy album released by Martin, was released on compact disc in 2006 by Wounded Bird Records.

The album peaked at No. 135 on the Billboard 200. The album was also his lowest selling album to date as well, and went uncertified. It was nominated in 1982 for a Grammy Award for Best Comedy Album.

== Production ==
The album was produced by William E. McEuen. Based on the album cover photos, the title refers to the two sides of Martin that are showcased: The Rich Comedian, showcased on side one, and the Peace-Loving Hippie Banjo player, showcased on side two. Although his self-taught banjo playing had been featured on previous albums, it was never showcased until The Steve Martin Brothers. It was the only album on which he brought in other writers to help him with his material, including Saturday Night Live writer Jack Handey. After the album was released, Martin decided to quit stand-up comedy. The banjo songs were recorded using studio time booked by the Nitty Gritty Dirt Band.

== Track listing ==
=== Side one ===
Cocktail Show, Vegas - 7:37

1. American Photography
2. A Scientific Question
3. What I Believe
4. A Show Biz Moment

Comedy Store, Hollywood - 11:27

5. The Real Me
6. Love God
7. Make the Rent
8. The Gospel Maniacs

=== Side two ===
1. Sally Goodin' – 1:08
2. Saga of the Old West – 2:30
3. John Henry – 2:00
4. Saga (Reprise) – 1:05
5. Pitkin County Turn Around – 1:07
6. Hoedown at Alice's – 2:23
7. Song of Perfect Spaces – 3:16
8. Freddie's Lilt, Parts I and II – 3:47
9. Waterbound – 1:16
10. Banana Banjo – 1:07

The entirety of side two was recorded in August 1981.

== Personnel ==
- Produced by William E. McEuen
- Mastered by Greg Fulginiti
