= Cruel Shoes =

Book by Steve Martin

- Author: Steve Martin
- Language: English
- Genre: Short story, Humor fiction, Absurdist fiction
- Publisher: G. P. Putnam's Sons
- Publication date: 1977 (limited edition), June, 1979 (1st trade hardcover printing)
- Publication place: United States
- Media type: Print (hardback & paperback)
- Pages: 179
- ISBN: 0-399-12304-0 (trade hardcover 1st printing)
- OCLC: 105863285
- Followed by: Pure Drivel (1998)

Cruel Shoes is a collection of essays and short stories by Steve Martin and is also the title of one of the essays included, a satirical short-short story about a woman in a shoe store.

Cruel Shoes was Martin’s first book, released in 1977 as a handmade limited edition of 750 signed and numbered books published by Press of the Pegacycle Lady (Victoria Dailey). The cover is just pale paper over pressboard. It only contained 48 pages and many of the stories that appeared in the trade version were not included.

== Table of contents ==
=== 1979 edition ===
The works included in the 1979 trade edition of the book are:

- "My Uncle's Metaphysics"
- "Demolition of Cathedral at Chart
- "Annareddy Akshayareddy and her struggle"
- "The Boring Leading the Bored"
- "Cruel Shoes"
- "The Bohemians"
- "Serious Dogs"
- "The Diarrhea Gardens of El Camino Real"
- "Turds"
- "The Undertakers"
- "The Day the Dopes Came Over"
- "The Smokers"
- "She Had The Jugs"
- "Sex Crazed Love Goddesses"
- "Women Without Bones"
- "The Children Called Him Big Nose"
- "Wrong Number"
- "Morse and the Naughty Magnets"
- "Dynamite King"
- "The Gift of the Magi Indian Giver"
- "Poodles... Great Eating"
- "Shuckin' the Jive"
- "How To Fold Soup"
- "The Vengeful Curtain Rod"
- "Cows In Trouble"
- "The Complete Works of Alfredo Francesi"
- "Society In Aspen"
- "The Day the Buffalo Danced"
- "Things Not To Be"
- "No Man's Land"
- "Oh Mercy, The Prose-Poem Triptych!"
- "Comedy Events You Can Do"
- "Dr. Fitzkee's Lucky Astrology Diet"
- "The Morning I Got Out of Bed"
- "What to Say When the Ducks Show Up"
- "The Year Winter Lasted Nine Minutes"
- "The Almaden Summer"
- "The Nervous Father"
- "Dogs In My Nose"
- "Awards"
- "Rivers of the Dead"
- "When Men Shop"
- "The Last Thing On My Mind"

=== Limited 1977 edition ===
1. "Confessions"
2. "Smokers"
3. "Jugs"
4. "Women"
5. "Poodles"
6. "Alfredo"
7. "Cows"
8. "Self-review"
9. "Serious"
10. "S.M. Collection of Am. Art"
11. "Day"
12. "Sex Crazed"
13. "Wrong #"
14. "Morse"
15. "Gift"
16. "Fold Soup"
17. "Dr. Fitzkees"
18. "Morning"
19. "Year"
20. "Last Thing"
21. "Other Books"
22. "My Uncle's"
23. "The Day"
24. "Children"
