= King Tut (song) =

1978 single by Steve Martin and the Toot Uncommons

Single by Steve Martin and the Toot Uncommons

from the album A Wild and Crazy Guy
- B-side: "Sally Goodin"; "Hoedown at Alice's"; "Excuse Me"
- Released: April 28, 1978
- Genre: Novelty; comedy; funk
- Length: 2:10 (Single Version) 3:40 (Album Version)
- Label: Warner Bros.
- Songwriter: Steve Martin
- Producer: William E. McEuen

Steve Martin singles chronology
"Grandmother's Song" (1977)	"King Tut" (1978)	"Cruel Shoes" (1979)

Music video
- Live performance of "King Tut" by Steve Martin on YouTube (3:33 minutes). Official Saturday Night Live channel, not available in all countries.

"King Tut" is a novelty song performed by Steve Martin and the Toot Uncommons (actually members of the Nitty Gritty Dirt Band), about the Egyptian pharaoh Tutankhamun and the Treasures of Tutankhamun traveling exhibit that toured seven American cities from 1976 to 1979. It was first performed on Saturday Night Live.

== History and description ==
"King Tut" caricatures Egyptian pharaoh Tutankhamun and the Treasures of Tutankhamun exhibit that toured seven American cities from 1976 to 1979. A blockbuster and a cultural touchstone, the exhibit attracted about eight million visitors.

The song was released as a single in 1978, sold over a million copies, and reached number 17 on the Billboard Hot 100 chart. The song was also included on Martin's album A Wild and Crazy Guy.

Martin previewed the song in a live performance during the April 22, 1978, episode of Saturday Night Live. In this performance, loyal subjects appease a joyful King Tut with kitchen appliances. An instrumental solo is delivered by saxophone player Lou Marini, who steps out of a sarcophagus—painted gold—to great laughter.

Record World said of the single that "this rocking novelty could bring Martin a single hit to go with his album sales. Archaeology and top 40 may never be the same again."

In the book Saturday Night: A Backstage History of Saturday Night Live, authors Doug Hill and Jeff Weingrad write that the sketch was one of the most expensive productions the show had attempted up to that point. Martin had brought the song to the show and asked if he could perform it, not expecting the elaborate production that ensued.

The song received much airplay from radio superstation WLS-AM in Chicago, where the Tut exhibition had been on display at the Field Museum of Natural History from April 15 to August 15, 1977. "King Tut" spent four weeks at the number-one position on the station's chart, and was ranked the 11th-biggest hit of 1978.

The song is analyzed in Melani McAlister's 2001 book, Epic Encounters: Culture, Media, and U.S. Interests in the Middle East Since 1945. It is mentioned in a dialogue in the video game The Lost Vikings (1992) at the end of one of the Egyptian-themed levels of the game.

Martin has performed "King Tut" live in a bluegrass arrangement with the band Steep Canyon Rangers on several occasions. One of these performances was released on the 2011 album Rare Bird Alert.

== Personnel ==
- Steve Martin – vocals
- Jeff Hanna – guitars
- Richard Hathaway – electric bass
- Merel Bregante – drums

== Chart performance ==
=== Weekly charts ===
Chart (1978)	Peak position
Canada RPM Top Singles	23
U.S. Billboard Hot 100	17
U.S. Cash Box Top 100	18

=== Year-end charts ===
Chart (1978)	Rank
Canada	164
US (Joel Whitburn's Pop Annual)	119
