= Shopgirl =

2005 film by Anand Tucker

- Theatrical release poster
- Directed by: Anand Tucker
- Screenplay by: Steve Martin
- Based on: Shopgirl by Steve Martin
- Produced by: Ashok Amritraj; Jon Jashni; Steve Martin
- Starring: Steve Martin; Claire Danes; Jason Schwartzman; Bridgette Wilson-Sampras
- Cinematography: Peter Suschitzky
- Edited by: David Gamble
- Music by: Barrington Pheloung
- Production companies: Touchstone Pictures; Hyde Park Entertainment
- Distributed by: Buena Vista Pictures Distribution
- Release dates: September 9, 2005 (TIFF); October 21, 2005 (United States)
- Running time: 104 minutes
- Country: United States
- Language: English
- Box office: $11.7 million

Shopgirl is a 2005 American romantic comedy-drama film directed by Anand Tucker and starring Steve Martin, Claire Danes, and Jason Schwartzman. The screenplay by Martin is based on his 2000 novella. The film follows a complex love triangle between a disenchanted salesgirl, a wealthy businessman, and an aimless young man.

Produced by Ashok Amritraj, Jon Jashni, and Martin for Touchstone Pictures and Hyde Park Entertainment, Shopgirl was released in the United States on October 21, 2005, by Buena Vista Pictures Distribution and received positive reviews from film critics. The film grossed $11.7 million worldwide and was nominated for four Satellite Awards, including Best Picture – Musical or Comedy and Best Adapted Screenplay.

== Plot ==
Mirabelle Buttersfield is a young aspiring artist from Vermont who works behind the women's glove counter at Saks Fifth Avenue in Beverly Hills. Clinically depressed and leading a solitary existence, Mirabelle soon finds herself romanced by two distinctly different men.

Jeremy is an immature, socially inept, penniless graphic designer for an amplifier manufacturer and an aspiring typographer who meets Mirabelle in a laundromat. Mirabelle, aching for a meaningful connection, gives Jeremy a chance, but she soon loses interest in him after an awkward first date, followed by a failed attempt at intercourse.

Ray Porter is an older, suave, wealthy, divorced logician. He buys a pair of gloves from Mirabelle at Saks and has them delivered to her apartment with an invitation to dinner, which she accepts. Following several dates, the two have sex at his house one night. The next morning, Ray tells Mirabelle that he does not intend for their relationship to be serious due to his constant travel between Los Angeles and Seattle. Each has a different understanding of this conversation: Ray tells his psychiatrist that Mirabelle knows they have an open relationship, while Mirabelle tells her friends that Ray wants to commit to her.

Mirabelle and Ray embark on a lengthy affair, while Jeremy attempts to see Mirabelle one last time before leaving as a roadie for the band Hot Tears, but she rejects him in favor of Ray. While on tour, the band's lead singer introduces Jeremy to self-help tapes on how to better relate to women. Mirabelle becomes increasingly devoted to Ray, who showers her with expensive gifts and pays off her student loans, instead of showing genuine affection. As her relationship with Ray progresses, Mirabelle stops taking her antidepressants, which heightens her depression. Ray takes her to the psychiatrist and cares for her, further deepening her reliance on him. Ray invites Mirabelle to accompany him on his upcoming trip to New York.

During a business trip, Ray has dinner with a former girlfriend who propositions him and he accepts, confessing the liaison to Mirabelle. Devastated, Mirabelle breaks up with him and abandons their trip to New York. While visiting her parents in Vermont, Mirabelle receives a phone call from Ray, who apologizes and asks her to meet him in New York. There, he takes her to a lavish party where she is the youngest guest and feels alone and out of place. At their hotel room, Mirabelle rebuffs Ray's sexual advances.

Back in Los Angeles, Mirabelle runs into Jeremy on her way to meet Ray at an art exhibition. When Mirabelle and Jeremy arrive together, her co-worker Lisa mistakes Jeremy for the wealthy Ray. Plotting to steal Ray from Mirabelle, Lisa seduces Jeremy before they go back to her place and have sex, during which she repeatedly calls him Ray. That evening, Mirabelle goes home with Ray. The next morning, Jeremy calls Lisa but is confused when she continues to call him Ray Porter. Meanwhile, Ray tells Mirabelle of his plans to search for a larger apartment in New York in case he meets someone and decides to have children. Heartbroken once again, Mirabelle permanently ends her relationship with Ray.

After a brief period of mourning, Mirabelle quits her job at Saks to become a receptionist in an art gallery. Jeremy pursues her again, properly, and they fall in love. Mirabelle is invited to show her work at the gallery, and Ray attends the opening with his new girlfriend, a gynecologist. Ray apologizes to Mirabelle for the way he treated her and admits that he did love her; she is visibly touched by his admission. The two embrace before Mirabelle rushes into Jeremy's arms. Watching Mirabelle and Jeremy together, Ray remarks that he feels a loss even though he had kept Mirabelle at arm's length to avoid the pain of their inevitable breakup.

== Cast ==
- Steve Martin as Ray Porter
- Claire Danes as Mirabelle Buttersfield
- Jason Schwartzman as Jeremy
- Bridgette Wilson-Sampras as Lisa Cramer
- Sam Bottoms as Dan Buttersfield
- Frances Conroy as Charlotte Buttersfield
- Rebecca Pidgeon as Christie Richards
- Gina Doctor as Del Ray
- Clyde Kusatsu as Mr. Agasa
- Samantha Shelton as Loki

== Production ==
In Steve Martin's original novella, Mirabelle was employed by Neiman Marcus. According to Evolution of a Novella: The Making of Shopgirl, a bonus feature on the DVD release, Saks Fifth Avenue actively pursued participation in the film by presenting a proposal to the producers and director and promising full cooperation with filming schedules. The gloves in the counter are not from Saks, but a boutique in Toronto, where part of the film was shot.

According to Martin's 2007 memoir Born Standing Up, there are many parallels to his own life. Early in his career, he lost a girlfriend to an older, suave gentleman resembling Ray Porter, real-life Mason Williams. Williams had a house that matches the description of Ray Porter's: it overlooked Los Angeles from roughly the same vantage point and the descriptions of the two houses are the same. Williams was an actuary at one point, whereas Porter was a logician. Martin and Williams both vied for the attention of a girlfriend, Nina. The relationship ended when Martin, much like Schwartzman's character, goes on a cross-country tour as a roadie. These parallels make the novella somewhat autobiographical.

In addition, Mirabelle is partially based on artist Allyson Hollingsworth, who was a consultant for the film and had a relationship with Martin in the 1990s. Photographs and drawings attributed to Mirabelle in the film are by Hollingsworth.

Martin had Tom Hanks in mind for the role of Ray Porter at the time he was writing the screenplay, but director Anand Tucker felt that Martin was so close to the material and had such a strong understanding of the character that Martin should play the part himself. After auditioning numerous actresses, he knew Claire Danes was perfect for the role of Mirabelle as soon as she began reading lines with Martin. He found Jeremy much more difficult to cast and remembered Jason Schwartzman (but not his name) from his performance in Rushmore only two weeks before filming was scheduled to begin.

The apartment building used for Mirabelle's residence is located at 1630 Griffith Park Boulevard in Los Angeles.

The songs "Lily & Parrots", "Carry Me Ohio" and "Make Like Paper" were written and performed by Mark Kozelek. Tucker remembered him from his appearance in Almost Famous and cast him as the lead singer of Hot Tears. Both "Carry Me Ohio" and "Lily and Parrots" were tracks on Ghosts of the Great Highway, the first CD released by Kozelek's real-life band Sun Kil Moon. "Make Like Paper" was a track from Songs for a Blue Guitar, an album by Kozelek's earlier band Red House Painters.

The film premiered at the Toronto International Film Festival in September 2005. It was shown at the Chicago International Film Festival and the Austin Film Festival before going into limited release in the United States.

== Reception ==
=== Box office ===
The film grossed $10,284,523 in the United States and Canada, and $1,390,638 in other territories, for a total worldwide box office of $11,675,161.

=== Critical response ===
On the review aggregator website Rotten Tomatoes, the film holds an approval rating of 61% based on 155 reviews, with an average rating of 6.3/10. The website's critics consensus reads, "Shopgirl is precariously slight, but it has some intriguing moments, and Danes is luminous." On Metacritic it has a score of 62 out of 100 based on 37 reviews. Audiences surveyed by CinemaScore gave the film a grade "B−" on scale of A to F.

Roger Ebert gave the film 3.5 out of 4 stars.

In his review for The New York Times, A. O. Scott called the film "elegant and exquisitely tailored ... both funny and sweetly sad" and added, "[It] is a resolutely small movie, finely made and perhaps a bit fragile. Under the pressure of too much thought, it might buckle and splinter; the characters might look flimsy, their comings and goings too neatly engineered, their lovability assumed rather than proven. And it's true that none of them are perfect. From where I sit, though, the film they inhabit comes pretty close."

Mick LaSalle of the San Francisco Chronicle described it as "a film of wisdom, emotional subtlety and power ... directed with a rare combination of delicacy and decisiveness."

In Variety, Joe Leydon observed, "Martin hits all the right notes while subtly conveying both the appealing sophistication and the purposeful reserve of Ray. But he cannot entirely avoid being overshadowed by Danes' endearingly vulnerable, emotionally multifaceted and fearlessly open performance. (In a few scenes, she appears so achingly luminescent it's almost heartbreaking to watch her.) The two stars bring out the very best in each other, particularly in a poignant final scene."

Carina Chocano of the Los Angeles Times said the film is "like Pygmalion for the upper-middle-brow business class flier. Which isn't to say it's bad. On the contrary, it's smart, spare, elegant and understated ... Danes can fill a scene with one wounded glance, and her body language alone conveys a richness of character that makes an otherwise not very expressive character mesmerizing."

In Rolling Stone, Peter Travers rated it three out of four stars and commented, "The May–December thing worked in Lost in Translation and it works here, thanks to the perceptive and gracefully romantic script that Martin has adapted from his novella. This is not the wild-and-crazy Martin of Bringing Down the House, this is the Martin who writes for The New Yorker with erudition and wit."

Steve Persall of the St. Petersburg Times graded the film C and called it "too slight to be considered a movie yet padded enough to pose as a feature-length work ... The blessing and curse of cinema is its ability to compress ideas into simple images. When the ideas are this simple, cinema crushes them to dullness. Mirabelle's unremarkable life simply doesn't deserve big screen treatment. Any author other than a Hollywood favorite like Martin likely wouldn't get it done."

In New York, Ken Tucker stated, "The challenge of the movie consists of making you believe that these two people, separated by age and status, could fall in love. Shopgirl succeeds in this with a confidence so sure and serene that you feel through much of the movie as though you’re listening to a fairy tale, an effect enhanced by the voice-over narration provided in soothing tones by Martin-as-Ray."

Susan Wloszczyna of USA Today said, "A serene luminescence surrounds Claire Danes [who]—reduced of late to action drivel (Terminator 3) or bit roles (The Hours)—finally fulfills the potent promise of her mid-90s TV series My So-Called Life. Los Angeles doesn't look half-bad, either. When director Anand Tucker isn't training his camera on the jewel-like traffic lights below or the sparkling cosmos above, he portrays the City of Angels as a haven of spare elegance and urbane stylishness, as if it were Woody Allen's Manhattan but with better weather and inviting outdoor pools. But save for savoring Danes and an L.A. cleansed of gaudy excess, there is little that is truly novel about Shopgirl ... The film ultimately lets Mirabelle down and leaves the viewer dissatisfied. A Lost in Translation drained of its wryly observed humor, Shopgirl is worth a browse. But it isn't always easy to buy."

=== Accolades ===
Award	Year	Category	Recipient	Result
Costume Designers Guild Awards	2005	Excellence in Contemporary Film	Nancy Steiner	Nominated
Satellite Awards	2005	Best Picture – Musical or Comedy	Shopgirl	Nominated
Satellite Awards	2005	Best Adapted Screenplay	Steve Martin	Nominated
Satellite Awards	2005	Best Actress – Motion Picture Musical or Comedy	Claire Danes	Nominated
Satellite Awards	2005	Best Supporting Actor – Motion Picture Musical or Comedy	Jason Schwartzman	Nominated
