= The Boarding House (nightclub) =

Former music and comedy nightclub

The Boarding House was a music and comedy nightclub, located at 960 Bush Street in San Francisco, California, opened by David Allen in 1971 and closed in the early 1980s. Many comedians launched their career at The Boarding House, including Robin Williams. Steve Martin's first three albums were recorded there, Let's Get Small, A Wild and Crazy Guy, and Comedy Is Not Pretty!, in whole or in part. Ellen DeGeneres and Jay Leno have said they first met at The Boarding House.

The club was also host to a multitude of musical acts, such as Jerry Garcia, Dire Straits, Dolly Parton, Patti Smith, Neil Young, Bette Midler, Billy Joel, Bob Marley and the Wailers, Mason Williams, The Tubes, Talking Heads, Old & In the Way, Randy Newman, Dan Hicks & His Hot Licks, Jim Croce, Harry Chapin, Hoyt Axton, Camel, and Tom Waits. The Residents also first played there.

== David Allen ==
Before opening the Boarding House in 1971, New Jersey-born David Allen had operated a target range on the top floor of California Hall on Polk Street, and performed as a repertory theater actor and, as "Deputy Dave" on KPIX's "Roundup", a children's show. In the 1960s, he worked with Enrico Banducci at the hungry i and helped nurture the careers of Barbra Streisand and Lenny Bruce. After he opened The Boarding House in 1971, he helped launch many noted comedians and musicians of the 1970s and 80s by booking them early in their career.

Entertainers and writers have noted that Allen was "genial", "loved and respected" but frequently in financial difficulties and often kept The Boarding House running "on charm alone," relying on benefits performed by stars whose careers he had launched.

== Bush Street location ==
=== History ===
Prior to the 1906 earthquake, the address was an apartment building called The Cecil.

"Club Kamokila was located at 960 Bush St., in San Francisco. Founded in 1933 by pineapple heiress Alice Kamokila Campbell, it was originally called Kamokila's Temple to Art. The temple was the auditorium, as the building was former church that became a speakeasy. Legal issues arose after the club was raided for unlawful liquor sales, and Campbell closed the club in April of 1934, & moved back to Hawaii. It was then taken over by Kamehameha Corporation, and renamed the Royal Hawaiian.

After the earthquake and resulting fire, it was rebuilt as a theater and known by many names over the years, including the Kamokila, Fack's II, The Royal Hawaiian Theater, The Bush Street Music Hall, The Balalaika Music Hall, The Neve (1960), a jazz club, The Cellar (1961), a topless club, Coast Recorders (1963 -1969), Doug Weston's The Troubadour North (1970), becoming The Boarding House in 1971.

=== Media coverage ===
The club was featured in Billboard in 1974 and by 1977, the same magazine called it "the city's top nightclub for major name entertainment." Robin Williams described David Allen and John L. Wasserman, entertainment reviewer for the San Francisco Chronicle, as "like a team". "David would find these strange unique talents and John's reviews would get people in."

== Columbus Street location and closure ==
After a disastrous fire, the Bush Street building was torn down in July 1980 and replaced by condominiums.

Dave Allen reopened the club for a short time in the city's North Beach district, at 901 Columbus Ave, formerly the Italian Village, where comedians Robin Williams, Lily Tomlin and Paula Poundstone performed. The club had closed by 1982; Allen died on May 25, 1984.

Financial interests in this new club included Lily Tomlin and Randy Baukney, of the Foxcroft Corp., the company which razed the Bush Street building and erected the condominium building.
