= Born Standing Up =

2007 memoir by Steve Martin

Born Standing Up: A Comic's Life
- First edition
- Author: Steve Martin
- Cover artist: Design by John Fulbrook III and photograph by Bobby Klein
- Language: English
- Subject: Memoir
- Publisher: Simon & Schuster Adult Publishing Group
- Publication date: November 20, 2007
- Publication place: United States
- English publication date: November 20, 2007
- Media type: print (Hardcover, Paperback); Audio Book
- Pages: 224 (hardcover)
- ISBN: 978-1-4165-5364-9
- OCLC: 153578765
- Dewey Decimal: 792.7/028092 B 22
- LC Class: PN2287.M522 A3 2007
- Preceded by: The Pleasure of My Company (2003)

Born Standing Up: A Comic's Life is a memoir, released November 20, 2007, by Steve Martin, an American author, actor, comedian, producer, playwright, musician, and screenwriter. It chronicles his early life, his days working for Disneyland, working at low tier coffee shops and clubs as a comedy act, his later days at the Bird Cage, his relationships, his eventual fame, and the reason why he quit stand-up comedy altogether at the height of his fame in 1981.

== Overview ==
The book examines Martin's childhood, and his first jobs at the Southern California theme parks Disneyland and Knott's Berry Farm. It includes his later stand-up comedy career, which lasted until 1981. In that year, Martin retired from stand-up comedy, feeling that he had achieved as much as he could with it, that his routine had become bloated and old, and that he would rather pursue his burgeoning film career.

Martin goes into detail about his act, including how others viewed his act, the tiny audiences he drew at the beginning of his career, and the huge shows performing in front of tens of thousands of fans at the height of his popularity. Through Martin's spare explanations, the reader comes to understand his love for magic, his early gags like the "Happy Feet", and his trademark three-piece white suit.

The book also deals with Martin's strained relationship with his family, especially his father. It relates how he eventually reconnected with each of his parents, and learned to appreciate them more than he had in his youth. It details his parents' deaths, and how he dealt with each of them.

He also makes observations about how the world was changing around him, from the early days of the "peace and love" culture to the more challenging time that followed it, and how he used his act to work through his feelings about those times.

An excerpt from the book was published in USA Today.

== Critical reception ==
Born Standing Up: A Comic's Life received mostly favorable reviews.

Lev Grossman, Time book critic, ranked the book number 6 on his 2007 "Top 10 Nonfiction Books" list.

Fellow comedian Jerry Seinfeld praised the book, calling it "one of the best books about comedy and being a comedian ever written."

== Audio book ==
The audio-book version was excerpted on The New Yorker's website.

=== Audio-book Grammy Award nomination ===
The audiobook version, read by the author, (and also released November 2007) was nominated for a 2009 Grammy Award for Best Spoken Word Album.
