= Reinhard Voigt =

German painter and ceramist

Reinhard Voigt (born 9 July 1940) is a German painter and ceramist.

== Career ==
After being trained as a ceramist, Voigt studied from 1965 to 1971 with Hans Thiemann, David Hockney and Gotthard Graubner, among others, at the Hochschule für bildende Künste Hamburg. After his studies, he had solo exhibitions at the Galerie M. E. Thelen in Cologne. Voigt was also featured in a solo presentation in the now legendary exhibition series "14 x 14" at the Kunsthalle Baden-Baden (1968-1973) alongside Palermo, Rainer Ruthenbeck, Georg Baselitz, Gerhard Richter and others of the then emerging generation of German painters. The painter emigrated to New York in 1978, moved to Los Angeles in 1985, and in 2000 moved to Upstate New York, where he remained until his return to Berlin in 2017. Voigt has always been faithful to the grid he developed in the academy as a basis and site for exploring the categories of form, abstraction, figuration, anonymity, ductus, color tonality, and ultimately beauty and legibility. The formal stringency of his approach has consequently led to describing his work as a negotiating space of the art-historically significant grid. It is in this context that his work was also exhibited in the 2012 exhibition "Rasterfahndung" alongside those of Roy Lichtenstein, Sigmar Polke, and others at the Kunstmuseum Stuttgart. Only recently has a reassessment taken place that also situates Voigt's lifelong work as a commentary on post-1945 German painting. Works by the artist are in the Bank of America Collection, London, the Eli Broad (Sun America Collection), Santa Monica, USA, the Kunstmuseum Stuttgart, the Collection of the State of Baden-Württemberg, the Städtische Galerie, Wolfsburg, the Museum of Modern Art, New York, and in numerous private collections. Reinhard Voigt was awarded a grant from the Stiftung Kunstfonds in 2021 for the cataloguing of his works. The artist lives and works in Berlin.

== Exhibitions (selection) ==
=== Solo exhibitions ===
- 2021 Reinard Voigt: Hör zu, jevouspropose, Zurich
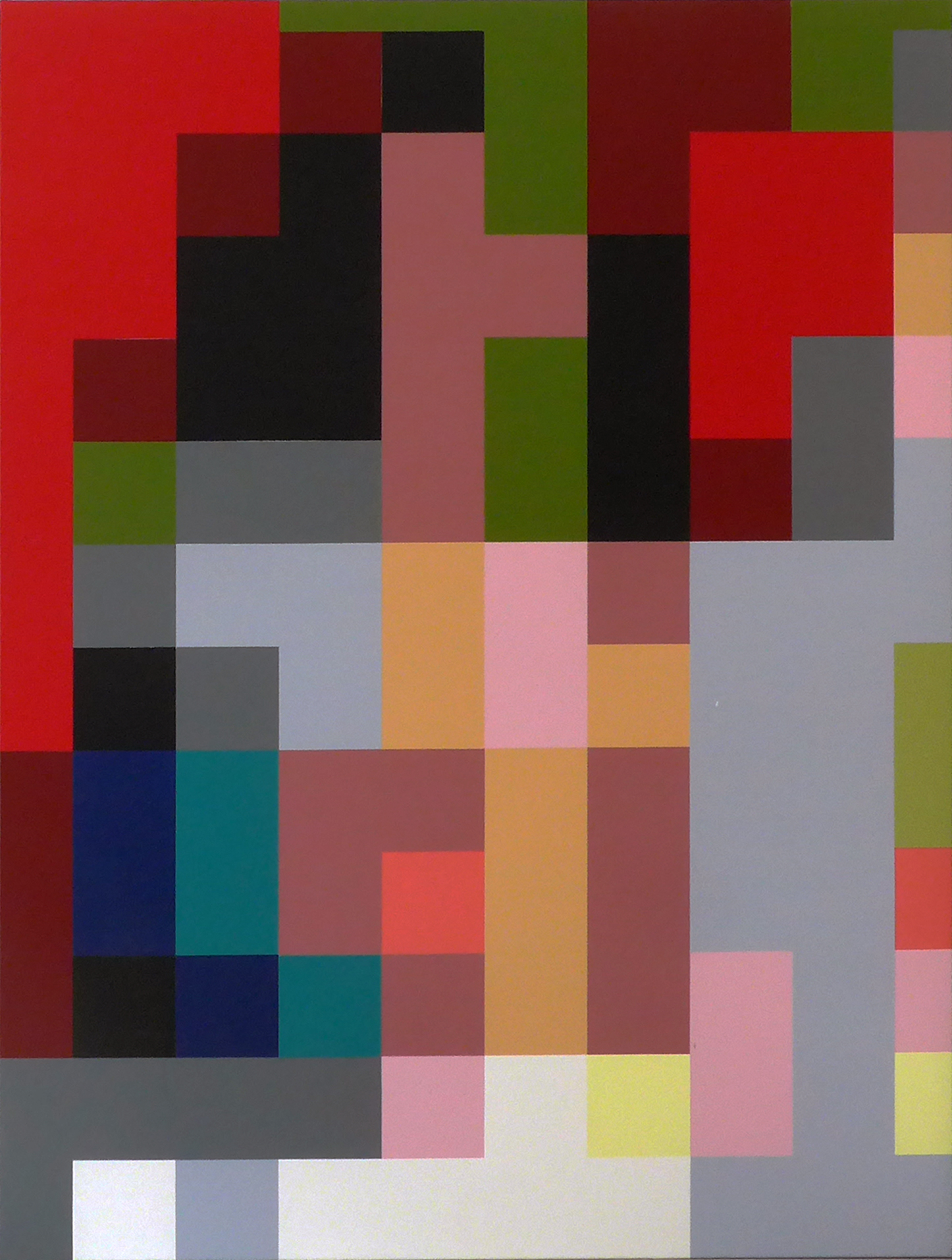
  Reinhard Voigt: Red Hook, 2018. Acrylic on canvas, 185 x 140 cm, courtesy the artist.
- 2020 DATA siegt!, FELD+HAUS, Frankfurt am Main
- 2018 Unsere Welt – der andere Blick, FELD+HAUS, Frankfurt am Main
- 2016 No Ideas But in Things, FELD+HAUS, Frankfurt am Main
- 2013 High Resolution, FELD+HAUS, Frankfurt am Main
- 2012 Ist der Mensch messbar, BQ Gallery, Berlin
- 2009 BQ Gallery, Berlin
- 2007 Kunstverein Gera, Gera
- 2006 BQ Gallery, Cologne
- 2003 BQ Gallery, Cologne
- 1999 Zella Gallery, London
- 1997 Gallery Gudrun Spielvogel, Munich
- 1995 Wortmalerei, Merve Verlag, Berlin
- 1993 In Memory Of Petra Kelly, Angles Gallery, Santa Monica, CA
- 1991 Reinhard Voigt: A Survey, Angles Gallery, Santa Monica, CA
- 1989 Decals, Komat Gallery, Braunschweig
- 1989 One Plus One, Kunstverein Wolfenbüttel
- 1989 Academy of Fine Arts, Braunschweig
- 1974 Salon K. Wolf, Essen
- 1973 Gallery M.E. Thelen, Köln
- 1972 Kunstverein Unna, Unna
- 1971 Gallery M.E. Thelen, Köln
- 1970 Kunsthalle Baden-Baden, Baden-Baden

=== Group exhibitions ===
- 2022 Alpensinfonie. Hans Erni Museum, Lucerne
- 2020 Good Vibrations. Sommer in der Pop-Art, Wilhelm-Hack-Museum, Ludwigshafen/Rhein
- 2020 ZONA MACO, FELD+HAUS, Mexico City
- 2019 ZONA MACO, FELD+HAUS, Mexico City
- 2018 ARTBO, FELD+HAUS, Bogota
- 2014 Frieze Art Fair, BQ Gallery, London
- 2013 Ed Ruscha Books & Co, Museum Brandhorst, Munich
- 2013 Ed Rusha Books & Co, Gagosian Gallery, New York
- 2013 „Gut Aufgelegt“, Sammlung H. Beck, Ludwigshafen/Rhein
- 2012 „Rasterfahndung“, Kunstmuseum Stuttgart, Stuttgart
- 2012 „Paul Thek, in Process“, Lehmbruck Museum, Duisburg
- 2010 „A Moving Plan B – Chapter One“, Drawing Room, London
- 2008 Frieze Art Fair, BQ Gallery, London
- 2006 Art Basel, BQ Gallery, Basel
- 2005 „Jahresgaben 05“, Kunstverein Köln, Cologne
- 2003 Kunsthalle Düsseldorf, Düsseldorf
- 2003 Frieze Art Fair, BQ Gallery, London
- 2002 Galerie vom Zufall und vom Glück, Hannover
- 1998 „The Table“, Sprengel Museum, Hannover
- 1986 „Meisterwerke der städtischen Galerie Wolfsburg“, Sarajevo
- 1979 Mathildenhöhe, Darmstadt
- 1978 Alex Rosenberg Gallery, New York
- 1974 „Junge Deutsche Kunst“, Gallery Ginza Five, Tokyo
- 1973 Galerie Rudolf Zwirner, Cologne
- 1973 Galerie H. Neuendorf, Hamburg/Cologne
