= Let's Get Small =

Live album by Steve Martin
- Released: 1977
- Recorded: 1977
- Venue: The Boarding House, San Francisco, California
- Genre: Comedy
- Length: 38:10
- Label: Warner Bros.
- Producer: William E. McEuen

Steve Martin chronology
Let's Get Small (1977)	A Wild and Crazy Guy (1978)

Professional ratings
Review scores
Source	Rating
AllMusic	4.5/5 stars
The Village Voice	B

Let's Get Small (1977) is an album by American comedian Steve Martin. It includes "Excuse Me", a comedy bit whose title went on to become a national catchphrase. The album went platinum and peaked at No. 10 on the Billboard Pop Albums Chart.

It was recorded at The Boarding House in San Francisco, California.

This album won the Grammy Award in 1978 for Best Comedy Album.

Some of Martin's bits were dependent on visual demonstration, such as when he dances as a Vegas pop singer on the track "Las Vegas" (presumably recognizing this in the context of recording the album, Martin's shoes are audible and quite loud as he performs the dance on this track) and also during the "Let's Get Small" track where he discusses getting small while driving — here he mimed driving a car while being so short as to barely reach the bottom of the steering wheel. Martin had debuted this particular bit in a February 26, 1977 appearance on the show Saturday Night Live.

The album cover shows Martin wearing balloon animals, bunny ears, Groucho Marx glasses, and a fake arrow through his head; these were all staples of his live act. He made balloon animals on some of his Saturday Night Live appearances as well as his guest appearance on The Muppet Show, while the fake arrow through the head was spoofed by Dinah Shore for a guest appearance by Martin on her talk show.

== Track listing ==
1. "Ramblin' Man/Theme from Ramblin' Man" – 2:14
2. "Vegas" – 5:45
3. "Let's Get Small" – 13:34
4. "Smoking" – 2:10
5. "One Way to Leave Your Lover" – 1:33
6. "Mad at My Mother" – 1:22
7. "Excuse Me" – 2:32
8. "Grandmother's Song" – 3:33
9. "Funny Comedy Gags" – 3:05
10. "Closing" – 2:02

"Grandmother's Song" was released as a 7" vinyl single. A very short excerpt of "Let's Get Small" is the single's B-side.

== Production ==
- Norman Seeff – photography

== Legacy ==
The phrase "well, excuuuuuuse me" has entered the vernacular due to a bit featured on this album.
