= A Wild and Crazy Guy =

Live album by Steve Martin
- Released: October 13, 1978
- Recorded: 1978
- Venue: The Boarding House, San Francisco; Red Rocks Amphitheatre, Denver
- Genre: Comedy
- Length: 39:28
- Label: Warner Bros.
- Producer: William E. McEuen

Steve Martin chronology
Let's Get Small (1977)	A Wild and Crazy Guy (1978)	Comedy Is Not Pretty! (1979)

Professional ratings
Review scores
Source	Rating
AllMusic	4.5/5 stars

A Wild and Crazy Guy is an album by American comedian Steve Martin released in October 1978. It reached number two on Billboard's Pop Albums Chart. The album was eventually certified double platinum.

It contains the hit novelty single "King Tut", backed up by the Nitty Gritty Dirt Band performing under the name, the Toot Uncommons. Martin also performed "King Tut" on Saturday Night Live. It also has Martin revealing his 'real' name, which he admits is the sound of him flipping his lips.

== Summary ==
The album was released just as his fame grew and the format reflects this. The first half of the album was performed in front of a small audience at The Boarding House in San Francisco, California, where his previous album had been recorded. The second half of the album was performed at the Red Rocks Amphitheatre. The switchover between venues is handled in a segue in the opening minute of the track "A Wild and Crazy Guy" which opened Side Two of the original vinyl long-player – Steve reads a bogus financial disclosure report to the audience at The Boarding House nightclub, and when he gets to calculating concert revenues he reveals his desire to make over $2 million on a single show; the audience reaction quickly changes from the enclosed intimacy of The Boarding House to the far more raucous, open amphitheatre of Red Rocks near Denver.

Martin reprises his role as Georg, one of the Czech Festrunk Brothers (a role he had popularized with Dan Aykroyd on Saturday Night Live) on two tracks – the second half of "A Wild and Crazy Guy" and "You Naive Americans".

== Track listing ==
1. "I'm Feelin' It" – 5:32
2. "Philosophy/Religion/College/Language" – 10:18
3. "Creativity in Action/I'm in the Mood for Love" – 2:25
4. "A Wild and Crazy Guy" – 7:00
5. "A Charitable Kind of Guy" – 1:38
6. "An Exposé" – 2:54
7. "Cat Handcuffs" – 1:41
8. "You Naïve Americans" – 2:00
9. "My Real Name" – 3:06
10. "King Tut" – 3:40

== Awards and recognition ==
The album won the Grammy Award in 1979 for Best Comedy Album.

In 2015, the album was deemed "culturally, historically, or aesthetically significant" by the Library of Congress and selected for preservation in the National Recording Registry.
