= Picasso at the Lapin Agile =

1993 play by Steve Martin

- Written by: Steve Martin
- Characters: Albert Einstein and Pablo Picasso
- Original language: English
- Setting: Montmartre

Premiere
- Date premiered: October 13, 1993
- Place premiered: Steppenwolf Theatre Company

Picasso at the Lapin Agile is a full-length play written by American actor, comedian, writer, producer, and musician Steve Martin in 1993.

== Description ==
The play features the characters of Albert Einstein and Pablo Picasso, who meet at a bar called the Lapin Agile (French: "Nimble Rabbit") in Montmartre, Paris. It is set on October 8, 1904, and both men are on the verge of disclosing amazing ideas (Einstein will publish his special theory of relativity in 1905 and Picasso will paint Les Demoiselles d'Avignon in 1907). At the Lapin Agile, they have a lengthy debate about the value of genius and talent, while interacting with a host of other characters.

Each character in Lapin Agile has a specific role. For example, Schmendiman, an inventor, believes he is a genius but really knows very little, while Gaston, an amicable old Frenchman with prostate problems, is hesitant to listen to or believe anything that does not revolve around sex or drinking. There is much discussion of the major cultural influences of the twentieth century. Picasso represents art, Einstein represents science, and Schmendiman represents commercialism.

Picasso and Einstein eventually realize that their abilities are equally valuable. Once the main characters have reached their moment of insight, "The Visitor", a man from the future, crashes the party. Although the Visitor is never named, his identity can be surmised as Elvis Presley. The Visitor adds a third dimension to Picasso's and Einstein's debate, representing the idea that genius is not always the product of academic or philosophical understanding, or as Gaston refers to it, "Brains".

Martin has written: "Focusing on Einstein’s Special Theory of Relativity and Picasso’s master painting, Les Demoiselles d'Avignon, the play attempts to explain, in a light-hearted way, the similarity of the creative process involved in great leaps of imagination in art and science".

== Cast, in order of appearance ==
- Freddy – The owner and bartender of the Lapin Agile. He is the boyfriend of Germaine, and seems to be a simple-minded man but occasionally says something truly stunning, and occasionally breaks the fourth wall.
- Gaston – An abrupt and direct old Frenchman with prostate problems, who talks plainly and seems to care only about sex and drinking
- Germaine – A waitress at the Lapin Agile. She is Freddy's girlfriend and a very thoughtful and beautiful woman. She has many ideas of what the 20th century will be like, and has slept with Picasso.
- Albert Einstein – A 25-year-old scientist with big aspirations. He is a genius, with a book on the way called The Special Theory of Relativity. He often finds himself having to explain his theories and thoughts in a simpler fashion to the rest of the group, as he is wise beyond his years.
- Suzanne – A beautiful 19-year-old girl who is infatuated with Picasso. Suzanne and Picasso have already slept together, and she is left hurt and angry when he does not remember her.
- Sagot – Picasso's art dealer, who is obsessed with finding and selling great pieces of art for profit
- Pablo Picasso – A talented and charismatic 23-year-old painter. Extremely egotistical and self-confident, he is a serial womanizer and master of manipulation.
- Charles Dabernow Schmendiman – A young inventor with huge dreams and little knowledge. Although he is hardworking, he is overshadowed by the genius and talent of Einstein and Picasso.
- The Countess – An extremely intelligent and attractive woman, with whom Einstein is infatuated. She thinks like he does, being the one person to really understand him in the play.
- A Female Admirer – A young admirer Picasso assumes is a fan of his, but who turns out to be an admirer of Schmendiman
- The Visitor – A polite and talented country-boy time-traveler, who adds another dimension and point of view to Einstein's and Picasso's debate. He is a blue-suede-shoed musician.

== Productions ==
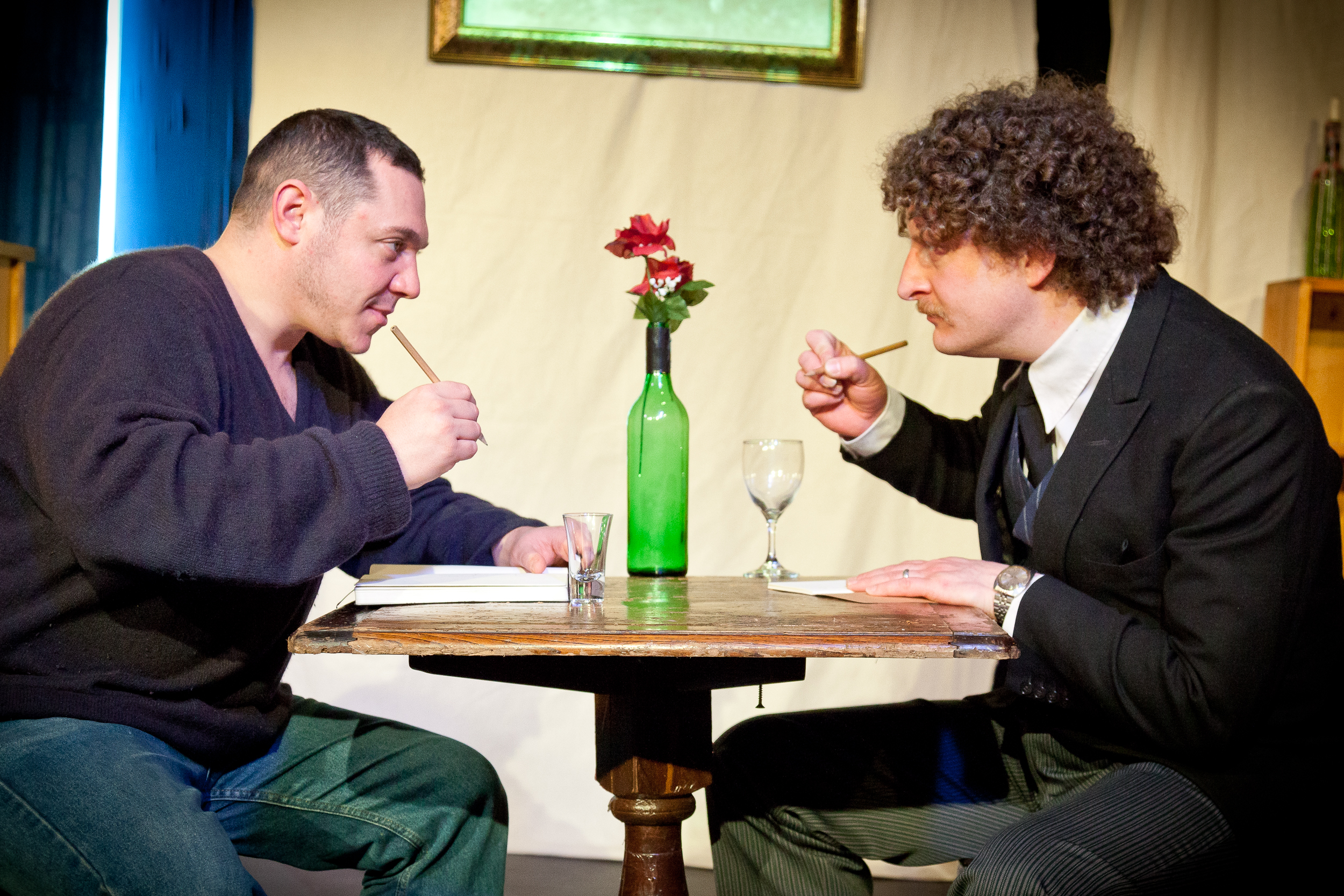
Picasso and Einstein in a 2011 production by OVO theatre company, St Albans, UK

Picasso at the Lapin Agile was the first full-length play written by Steve Martin. The first reading of the play took place at Steve Martin's home in Beverly Hills, California. Tom Hanks read the role of Picasso, and Chris Sarandon read Einstein.

Martin then held a nine-day professional workshop of the play in Melbourne, Australia, at the Malthouse Theatre (in conjunction with Belvoir St Theatre), which ended with two public staged readings of the play. Following this, the play opened at the Steppenwolf Theatre Company in Chicago, Illinois, on October 13, 1993. The show then enjoyed a successful run at the Westwood Playhouse (now known as the Geffen Playhouse) in Los Angeles, California. Finally, the show made its way to New York City. The play has also had successful runs in other American cities.

Martin made several attempts to create a film version of the play, but none came to fruition. On November 27, 2006, Martin announced on his website that "there is no movie of Picasso at the Lapin Agile in the works".

== Controversy ==
The play was pulled from La Grande High School in La Grande, Oregon in March 2009 following a parent-led petition with 137 names opposed to the staging of the play. The petitioners objected to some of the adult themes and content, in response to which Martin wrote that the students knew that the "questionable behavior sometimes evident in the play is not endorsed.” In his letter to La Grande Observer, he compared the characterization that the play is about "people drinking in bars and treating women as sex objects" to summarizing Shakespeare's Hamlet as being "about a castle.” Martin responded to the banning of the play at La Grande High School with an offer to underwrite a production of the play at an alternative location, stating he did not want the play to acquire "a reputation it does not deserve.”
