= Shopgirl (novella) =

2000 novella written by Steve Martin

- First edition cover
- Author: Steve Martin
- Language: English
- Genre: Fiction; Romance
- Publisher: Hyperion
- Publication date: October 11, 2000
- Publication place: United States
- Pages: 130
- ISBN: 0-7868-8568-8
- OCLC: 49378339

Shopgirl is a 2000 novella written by Steve Martin. Martin adapted his book for a 2005 film of the same title.

== Synopsis ==
Its titular character is 28-year-old Mirabelle Buttersfield, a lonely, depressed woman who has moved from Vermont who sells expensive evening gloves that rarely sell at Neiman Marcus in Beverly Hills and spends her evenings watching television with her two cats. She moved to California in an attempt to find herself and fall in love but instead takes medication to fight off depression. She runs into a socially inept, unambitious slacker who works as a roadie for a band, and winds up entertaining his advances to avoid being alone. After a middle-aged, Seattle tech millionaire named Ray Porter visits her store and sends her a dinner invitation, the two begin to date. She falls in love with him, even though it's clear Porter isn't looking for a long-term commitment. Along the way, the story explores the deeper meaning behind their opposing intentions. Also playing roles in her life are her father, a dysfunctional Vietnam War veteran, and Lisa, her promiscuous, image-obsessed co-worker and voracious rival.

== Reception ==
In his review in The New York Times, John Lanchester called it an "elegant, bleak, desolatingly sad first novella" and added, "The prose here is sometimes flat . . . the happy ending feels as if it has wandered in from somewhere else; and there is a touching confidence in the efficacy of self-help books. But there is nonetheless an impressive gravity about Shopgirl. Its glints of comedy are sharp and dry . . . The novella has an edge to it, and a deep, unassuageable loneliness. Steve Martin's most achieved work to date may well have the strange effect of making people glad not to be Steve Martin."

Sienna Powers of January Magazine said "Shopgirl is the work of a mature, self-possessed writer . . . Martin infuses his story with a dark verve that is his own. The author's tone is at once blasé and gentle and in the novella's 130 pages, he quietly presents us with a cast of characters that it's difficult not to care about."

In Entertainment Weekly, Margot Mifflin graded the book B with the comment, "Once you adjust to his newfound sincerity, Martin's shift from public follies to private frailties registers as courageous and convincing. If only he'd fleshed out his supporting cast, this would be Pure Gold."

The book entered the New York Times list of bestsellers at #6 on October 29, 2000. It peaked at #4 and remained on the list for 15 weeks.
