= 55th Annual Grammy Awards =

2013 US music awards ceremony

- Official poster by Erika Iris Simmons
- Date: February 10, 2013; 5:00–8:30 p.m. PST
- Location: Staples Center, Los Angeles, US
- Hosted by: LL Cool J

Highlights
- Most awards: Dan Auerbach (5)
- Most nominations: Dan Auerbach, Fun, Jay-Z, Mumford & Sons, Frank Ocean, Kanye West (6 each)
- Website: http://www.grammy.com/nominees

Television/radio coverage
- Network: CBS
- Viewership: 28.3 million viewers

The 55th Annual Grammy Awards were held on February 10, 2013, at the Staples Center in Los Angeles honoring the best in music for the recording year beginning October 1, 2011 through September 30, 2012. The show was broadcast on CBS at 8 p.m. ET/PT and was hosted for the second time by LL Cool J. The "Pre-Telecast Ceremony" was streamed live from LA's Nokia Theater at the official Grammy website. Nominations were announced on December 5, 2012, on prime-time television as part of "The GRAMMY Nominations Concert Live! – Countdown to Music's Biggest Night", a one-hour special co-hosted by LL Cool J & Taylor Swift and broadcast live on CBS from the Bridgestone Arena in Nashville, Tennessee. Fun, Frank Ocean, Mumford & Sons, Jay-Z, Kanye West and Dan Auerbach received the most nominations with six each.

Gotye and Kimbra won the Record of the Year for "Somebody That I Used to Know", becoming the second Australian and first New Zealand act to win the award. Mumford & Sons won the Album of the Year for Babel, and Fun won the Song of the Year (with Jeff Bhasker) for "We Are Young" as well as the Best New Artist. Kelly Clarkson won the Best Pop Vocal Album for Stronger, becoming the first and only artist to win the award twice. Dan Auerbach won the most awards during the ceremony, with five (including three as part of The Black Keys); followed by The Black Keys, Gotye, Jay-Z, Skrillex, Kanye West, with three each. Other multiple winners include: Chick Corea, Fun, Kimbra, Mumford & Sons, Frank Ocean, Matt Redman and Esperanza Spalding with two awards each.

The Recording Academy introduced three new categories to the 78 awards previously presented at the 54th ceremony—Best Classical Compendium, Best Latin Jazz Album, and Best Urban Contemporary Album, bringing it to a total of 81 awards. 70 of them were presented at the pre-telecast at the Nokia Theatre, with the remaining 11 were presented at the main ceremony. Bruce Springsteen received the MusiCares Person of the Year award on February 8, 2013, at the 23rd Grammy Benefit Gala at the Los Angeles Convention Center, two nights prior to the main ceremony. The official poster was designed by Artist Erika Iris Simmons. The program producer is AEG Ehrlich Ventures, with Ken Ehrlich serving as executive producer, Louis J. Horvitz as director and David Wild and Ken Ehrlich as writers.

== Performers ==
The following artists performed on the pre-telecast:

- Krishna Das
- Eighth Blackbird
- John Fullbright
- Hugh Masekela
- Tyrese
- Elle Varner

The following performed on the main telecast:

Artist(s)	Song(s)
Taylor Swift	"We Are Never Ever Getting Back Together"
Elton John; Ed Sheeran	"The A Team"
Fun	"Carry On"
Miranda Lambert; Dierks Bentley	"Over You" "Home"
Miguel; Wiz Khalifa	"Adorn"
Mumford & Sons	"I Will Wait"
Justin Timberlake; Jay-Z	"Suit & Tie" "Pusher Love Girl"
Maroon 5 Alicia Keys	"Daylight" "Girl on Fire"
Rihanna; Mikky Ekko	"Stay"
Dr. John; The Preservation Hall Jazz Band; The Black Keys	"Lonely Boy"
Kelly Clarkson	Tribute to Patti Page and Homage to Carole King "Tennessee Waltz" "(You Make Me Feel Like) A Natural Woman"
Bruno Mars; Rihanna; Sting; Damian Marley; Ziggy Marley	Tribute to Bob Marley "Locked Out of Heaven" "Walking on the Moon" "Could You Be Loved" "And Be Loved"
The Lumineers	"Ho Hey"
Jack White; Ruby Amanfu	"Love Interruption" "Freedom at 21"
Carrie Underwood	"Blown Away" "Two Black Cadillacs"
Stanley Clarke; Chick Corea; Kenny Garrett	Tribute to Dave Brubeck "Take Five"
Zac Brown; Brittany Howard; Elton John; Mumford & Sons; Mavis Staples; T Bone Burnett (musical director)	Tribute to Levon Helm and the Sandy Hook shooting "The Weight"
Juanes	"Your Song"
Frank Ocean	"Forrest Gump"
Travis Barker; Chuck D LL Cool J Tom Morello; DJ Z-Trip	Tribute to Adam Yauch "Whaddup" "Welcome to the Terrordome" "No Sleep till Brooklyn"

== Presenters ==
The following presented on the pre-telecast:

Artist
Radmilla Cody
Janis Ian
Kaskade
Britt Nicole
Manuel Valera

The following presented on the main telecast:

- Jennifer Lopez and Pitbull – presented Best Pop Solo Performance
- Neil Patrick Harris – introduced Fun
- John Mayer and Bonnie Raitt – introduced Miranda Lambert and Dierks Bentley
- Miguel and Wiz Khalifa – presented Best Country Solo Performance
- Faith Hill and Tim McGraw – presented Song of the Year
- Johnny Depp – introduced Mumford & Sons
- Beyoncé and Ellen DeGeneres – introduced Justin Timberlake
- Dave Grohl and Pauley Perrette – presented Producer of the Year, Non-Classical & Best Rock Performance
- Kelly Rowland and Nas – presented Best Urban Contemporary Album
- Keith Urban and Kaley Cuoco – presented Best Pop Vocal Album
- Carly Rae Jepsen and Ne-Yo – presented Best Rap/Sung Collaboration
- Kelly Clarkson – paid tribute to Patti Page & Carole King as Lifetime Achievement Award recipients & presented Best Country Album
- Kat Dennings – introduced The Black Eyed Peas
- Katy Perry – presented Best New Artist
- Hunter Hayes – introduced Carrie Underwood
- Prince – presented Record of the Year
- Adele – presented Album of the Year

== Winners and nominees ==
The winners and nominees per category were:

=== General ===
General Awards
Album of the Year (presented by Adele)	Record of the Year (presented by Prince)
Babel – Mumford & Sons; Blunderbuss – Jack White; Channel Orange – Frank Ocean; El Camino – The Black Keys; Some Nights – Fun	"Somebody That I Used to Know" – Gotye featuring Kimbra; "Lonely Boy" – The Black Keys; "Stronger (What Doesn't Kill You)" – Kelly Clarkson; "Thinkin Bout You" – Frank Ocean; "We Are Never Ever Getting Back Together" – Taylor Swift; "We Are Young" – Fun featuring Janelle Monáe
Song of the Year (presented by Faith Hill and Tim McGraw)	Best New Artist (presented by Katy Perry)
"We Are Young" – Jack Antonoff, Jeff Bhasker, Andrew Dost, & Nate Ruess (Fun featuring Janelle Monáe); "The A Team" – Ed Sheeran (Ed Sheeran); "Adorn" – Miguel Pimentel (Miguel); "Call Me Maybe" – Tavish Crowe, Carly Rae Jepsen, & Josh Ramsay (Carly Rae Jepsen); "Stronger (What Doesn't Kill You)" – Jörgen Elofsson, David Gamson, Greg Kurstin, & Ali Tamposi (Kelly Clarkson)	Fun; Alabama Shakes; Frank Ocean; Hunter Hayes; The Lumineers

Album of the Year (additional personnel)
Album Nominee	Performer	Production	Engineering	Mastering
Babel	Mumford & Sons	Markus Dravs	Robin Baynton & Ruadhri Cushnan	Bob Ludwig
Blunderbuss	Jack White	Jack White	Vance Powell & Jack White	Bob Ludwig
Channel Orange	Frank Ocean feat. André 3000, John Mayer & Earl Sweatshirt	Om'Mas Keith, Malay, Frank Ocean, Shea Taylor, Tyler, the Creator, & Pharrell	Calvin Bailif, Andrew Coleman, Jeff Ellis, Doug Fenske, Om'Mas Keith, Malay, Frank Ocean, Philip Scott, Mark "Spike" Stent, Pat Thrall, Marcos Tovar, & Vic Wainstein	Vlado Meller
El Camino	The Black Keys	The Black Keys & Danger Mouse	Tchad Blake, Tom Elmhirst, & Kennie Takahashi	Brian Lucey
Some Nights	Fun feat. Janelle Monáe	Jeff Bhasker, Emile Haynie, Jake One, & TommyD	Jeff Bhasker, Pawel Sek, Pete Bischoff, Ken Lewis, Jeff Chestek, Andrew Dawson, Emile Haynie, Rich Costey, Manny Marroquin, Sonny Pinnar, & Stuart White	Chris Gehringer

Record of the Year (additional personnel)
Record Nominee	Performer	Production	Engineering	Mastering
"Somebody That I Used to Know"	Gotye featuring Kimbra	Wally de Backer	Wally de Backer, François Tétaz & William Bowden	William Bowden
"Lonely Boy"	The Black Keys	The Black Keys & Danger Mouse	Tom Elmhirst & Kennie Takahashi	Brian Lucey
"Stronger (What Doesn't Kill You)"	Kelly Clarkson	Greg Kurstin	Serban Ghenea, John Hanes, Greg Kurstin, & Jesse Shatkin	Chris Gehringer
"Thinkin Bout You"	Frank Ocean	Shea Taylor & Frank Ocean	Jeff Ellis, Pat Thrall, Marcos Tovar, & Mark "Spike" Stent	Vlado Meller
"We Are Never Ever Getting Back Together"	Taylor Swift	Max Martin, Shellback & Taylor Swift	Serban Ghenea, John Hanes, Sam Holland, & Michael Ilbert	Tom Coyne
"We Are Young"	Fun featuring Janelle Monáe	Jeff Bhasker	Jeff Bhasker, Pawel Sek, Ken Lewis, Andrew Dawson, & Stuart White	Chris Gehringer

=== Pop ===
Best Pop Solo Performance (presented by Jennifer Lopez and Pitbull)	Best Pop Duo/Group Performance
"Set Fire to the Rain" (Live) – Adele; "Call Me Maybe" – Carly Rae Jepsen; "Stronger (What Doesn't Kill You)" – Kelly Clarkson; "Where Have You Been" – Rihanna; "Wide Awake" – Katy Perry	"Somebody That I Used to Know" – Gotye featuring Kimbra; "Payphone" – Maroon 5 & Wiz Khalifa; "Sexy and I Know It" – LMFAO; "Shake It Out" – Florence and the Machine; "We Are Young" – Fun featuring Janelle Monáe
Best Pop Vocal Album (presented by Keith Urban and Kaley Cuoco)	Best Pop Instrumental Album
Stronger – Kelly Clarkson; Ceremonials – Florence and the Machine; Overexposed – Maroon 5; Some Nights – Fun; The Truth About Love – P!nk	Impressions – Chris Botti; 24/7 – Gerald Albright & Norman Brown; Four Hands & a Heart Volume One – Larry Carlton; Live at Blue Note Tokyo – Dave Koz; Rumbadoodle – Arun Shenoy
Best Traditional Pop Vocal Album
Kisses on the Bottom – Paul McCartney; Christmas – Michael Bublé; A Holiday Carole – Carole King

=== Dance/Electronic ===
Best Dance/Electronic Album	Best Dance Recording
Bangarang – Skrillex; > Album Title Goes Here < – Deadmau5; Don't Think – The Chemical Brothers; Fire & Ice – Kaskade; Wonderland – Steve Aoki	"Bangarang" – Skrillex & Sirah; Skrillex, producer; Skrillex, mixer; "Levels" – Avicii; Tim Bergling & Ash Pournouri, producers; Tim Bergling, mixer; "Let's Go" – Calvin Harris & Ne-Yo; Calvin Harris, producer; Calvin Harris, mixer; "Don't You Worry Child" – Swedish House Mafia & John Martin; Steve Angello, Axwell & Sebastian Ingrosso, producers; Steve Angello, Axwell & Sebastian Ingrosso, mixers; "I Can't Live Without You" – Al Walser; Al Walser, producer; Al Walser, mixer

=== Rock and alternative ===
Best Rock Album	Best Rock Song
El Camino – The Black Keys; The 2nd Law – Muse; Blunderbuss – Jack White; Mylo Xyloto – Coldplay; Wrecking Ball – Bruce Springsteen	"Lonely Boy" – Dan Auerbach, Brian Burton, & Patrick Carney (The Black Keys); "Freedom at 21" – Jack White (Jack White); "I Will Wait" – Ted Dwane, Ben Lovett, Winston Marshall, & Marcus Mumford (Mumford & Sons); "Madness" – Matt Bellamy (Muse); "We Take Care of Our Own" – Bruce Springsteen (Bruce Springsteen)
Best Rock Performance	Best Hard Rock/Metal Performance
"Lonely Boy" – The Black Keys; "Charlie Brown" – Coldplay; "Hold On" – Alabama Shakes; "I Will Wait" – Mumford & Sons; "We Take Care of Our Own" – Bruce Springsteen	"Love Bites (So Do I)" – Halestorm; "Blood Brothers (live)" – Iron Maiden; "Ghost Walking" – Lamb of God; "I'm Alive" – Anthrax; "No Reflection" – Marilyn Manson; "Whose Life (Is It Anyways?)" – Megadeth
Best Alternative Music Album
Making Mirrors – Gotye; Bad as Me – Tom Waits; Biophilia – Björk; Hurry Up, We're Dreaming – M83; The Idler Wheel Is Wiser Than the Driver of the Screw and Whipping Cords Will Serve You More Than Ropes Will Ever Do – Fiona Apple

=== R&B ===
Best R&B Performance	Best Traditional R&B Performance
"Climax" – Usher; "Thank You" – Estelle; "Gonna Be Alright (F.T.B.)" – Robert Glasper Experiment & Ledisi; "I Want You" – Luke James; "Adorn" – Miguel	"Love on Top" – Beyoncé; "Lately" – Anita Baker; "Wrong Side of a Love Song" – Melanie Fiona; "Real Good Hands" – Gregory Porter; "If Only You Knew" – SWV
Best R&B Album	Best Urban Contemporary Album
Black Radio – Robert Glasper Experiment; Back to Love – Anthony Hamilton; Write Me Back – R. Kelly; Beautiful Surprise – Tamia; Open Invitation – Tyrese	Channel Orange – Frank Ocean; Fortune – Chris Brown; Kaleidoscope Dream – Miguel
Best R&B Song
"Adorn"; Miguel Pimentel, songwriter (Miguel); "Beautiful Surprise"; Tamia Hill, Claude Kelly & Salaam Remi, songwriters (Tamia); "Heart Attack"; Benjamin Levin, Rico Love & Tremaine Neverson, songwriters (Trey Songz); "Pray for Me"; Antonio Dixon, Kenny Edmonds, Anthony Hamilton & Patrick "jQue" Smith, songwriters (Anthony Hamilton); "Refill"; Darhyl "DJ" Camper, Elle Varner & Andrew "Pop" Wansel, songwriters (Elle Varner)

=== Rap ===
Best Rap Album	Best Rap Song
Take Care – Drake; Based on a T.R.U. Story – 2 Chainz; Food & Liquor II: The Great American Rap Album. Pt. 1 – Lupe Fiasco; Life Is Good – Nas; God Forgives, I Don't – Rick Ross; Undun – The Roots	"Niggas in Paris" – Shawn Carter, Mike Dean, Chauncey Hollis & Kanye West (W.A. Donaldson, samples) (Jay-Z & Kanye West); "Daughters" – Nas & Ernest Wilson (Patrick Adams, Gary DeCarlo, Dale Frashuer & Paul Leka, samples) (Nas); "Lotus Flower Bomb" – Olubowale Akintimehin (Wale), S. Joseph Dew, Jerrin Howard, Walker Johnson & Miguel Jontel Pimentel (Wale & Miguel); "Mercy" – Sean Anderson, Tauheed Epps, Stephan Taft, James Thomas, Terrence Thornton & Kanye West (Denzie Beagle, Winston Riley & Reggie Williams, samples) (Kanye West, Big Sean, Pusha T & 2 Chainz); "The Motto" – Dwayne Carter, Aubrey Graham & Tyler Williams, songwriters (Drake feat. Lil' Wayne); "Young, Wild & Free" – Calvin Broadus, Chris Brody Brown, Philip Lawrence, Ari Levine, Peter Hernandez & Cameron Thomaz (T. Bluechel, M. Borrow, T. Griffin, K. Jackson, N. Lee & M. Newman, samples) (Wiz Khalifa & Snoop Dogg feat. Bruno Mars)
Best Rap Performance	Best Rap/Sung Collaboration
"Niggas in Paris" – Jay-Z & Kanye West; "Daughters" – Nas; "HYFR (Hell Ya Fucking Right)" – Drake & Lil Wayne; "I Do" – Young Jeezy featuring Jay-Z & André 3000; "Mercy" – Kanye West, Big Sean, Pusha T & 2 Chainz	"No Church in the Wild" – Jay-Z and Kanye West featuring Frank Ocean & The-Dream; "Cherry Wine" – Nas & Amy Winehouse; "Talk That Talk" – Rihanna & Jay-Z; "Tonight (Best You Ever Had)" – John Legend & Ludacris; "Wild Ones" – Flo Rida & Sia

=== Country ===
Best Country Solo Performance (presented by Miguel and Wiz Khalifa)	Best Country Duo/Group Performance
"Blown Away" – Carrie Underwood; "Cost of Livin'" – Ronnie Dunn; "Home" – Dierks Bentley; "Over" – Blake Shelton; "Springsteen" – Eric Church; "Wanted" – Hunter Hayes	"Pontoon" – Little Big Town; "Even If It Breaks Your Heart" – Eli Young Band; "I Just Come Here For The Music" – Don Williams featuring Alison Krauss; "On The Outskirts Of Town" – The Time Jumpers; "Safe & Sound" – Taylor Swift featuring The Civil Wars
Best Country Album (presented by Kelly Clarkson)	Best Country Song
Uncaged – Zac Brown Band; Four the Record – Miranda Lambert; Hunter Hayes – Hunter Hayes; Living for a Song: A Tribute to Hank Cochran – Jamey Johnson; The Time Jumpers – The Time Jumpers	"Blown Away" – Josh Kear & Chris Tompkins (Carrie Underwood); "Cost of Livin'" – Phillip Coleman & Ronnie Dunn (Ronnie Dunn); "Even If It Breaks Your Heart" – Will Hoge & Eric Paslay (Eli Young Band); "So You Don't Have to Love Me Anymore" – Jay Knowles & Adam Wright (Alan Jackson); "Springsteen" – Eric Church, Jeff Hyde & Ryan Tyndell (Eric Church)

=== Jazz and New Age ===
Best Jazz Vocal Album	Best Jazz Instrumental Album
Radio Music Society – Esperanza Spalding; 1619 Broadway – The Brill Building Project – Kurt Elling; The Book of Chet – Luciana Souza; Live – Al Jarreau & The Metropole Orkest; Soul Shadows – Denise Donatelli	Unity Band – Pat Metheny Unity Band; Blue Moon – Ahmad Jamal; Further Explorations – Chick Corea, Eddie Gómez & Paul Motian; Hot House – Chick Corea & Gary Burton; Seeds from the Underground – Kenny Garrett
Best Large Jazz Ensemble Album	Best Latin Jazz Album
Dear Diz (Every Day I Think of You) – Arturo Sandoval; Centennial: Newly Discovered Works of Gil Evans – Gil Evans Project; For the Moment – Bob Mintzer Big Band	¡Ritmo! – The Clare Fischer Latin Jazz Big Band; Duos III – Luciana Souza; Flamenco Sketches – Chano Domínguez; Multiverse – Bobby Sanabria Big Band; New Cuban Express – Manuel Valera New Cuban Express
Best Improvised Jazz Solo	Best New Age Album
"Hot House" – Gary Burton & Chick Corea; "Alice in Wonderland" – Chick Corea; "Cross Roads" – Ravi Coltrane; "J. Mac" – Kenny Garrett; "Ode" – Brad Mehldau	Echoes of Love – Omar Akram; Bindu – Michael Brant DeMaria; Deep Alpha – Steven Halpern; Light Body – Peter Kater; Live Ananda – Krishna Das; Troubadours on the Rhine – Loreena McKennitt

=== Gospel/Contemporary Christian ===
Best Gospel/Contemporary Christian Music Performance

- "10,000 Reasons (Bless the Lord)" – Matt Redman
- "Jesus, Friend of Sinners" – Casting Crowns
- "Take Me to the King" – Tamela Mann
- "Go Get It" – Mary Mary
- "My Testimony" – Marvin Sapp

Best Gospel Song

- "Go Get It"
- Erica Campbell, Tina Campbell & Warryn Campbell, songwriters (Mary Mary)
  - "Hold On"
    - Cheryl Fortune, James Fortune & Terence Vaughn, songwriters (James Fortune & FIYA, Monica & Fred Hammond)
  - "I Feel Good"
    - Phillip Feaster, Fred Hammond, Jonathan Miller & Calvin Rodgers, songwriters (Fred Hammond)
  - "My Testimony"
    - Aaron Lindsey & Marvin Sapp, songwriters (Marvin Sapp)
  - "Released"
    - Donald Lawrence, songwriter (Bill Winston & Living Word Featuring Donald Lawrence)

Best Contemporary Christian Music Song

- "10,000 Reasons (Bless the Lord)" (tie)
- Jonas Myrin & Matt Redman, songwriters (Matt Redman)
- "Your Presence Is Heaven" (tie)
- Israel Houghton & Micah Massey, songwriters (Israel & New Breed)
  - "Jesus, Friend of Sinners"
    - Mark Hall & Matthew West, songwriters (Casting Crowns)
  - "When Mercy Found Me"
    - Jeff Pardo & Rhett Walker, songwriters (Rhett Walker Band)
  - "White Flag"
    - Jason Ingram, Matt Maher, Matt Redman & Chris Tomlin, songwriters (Passion & Chris Tomlin)

Best Gospel Album

- Gravity – Lecrae
- Identity – James Fortune
- Jesus at the Center: Live – Israel & New Breed
- I Win – Marvin Sapp
- Worship Soul – Anita Wilson

Best Contemporary Christian Music Album

- Eye on It – TobyMac
- Come to the Well – Casting Crowns
- Where I Find You – Kari Jobe
- Gold – Britt Nicole
- Into the Light – Matthew West

=== Latin ===
Best Latin Pop Album

- MTV Unplugged: Deluxe Edition – Juanes
- Independiente – Ricardo Arjona
- Ilusión – Fonseca
- Kany Garcia – Kany Garcia
- ¿Con Quién Se Queda El Perro? – Jesse & Joy

Best Latin Rock Urban or Alternative Album

- Imaginaries – Quetzal
- Campo – Campo
- Déjenme Llorar – Carla Morrison
- Electro-Jarocho – Sistema Bomb
- La Bala – Ana Tijoux

Best Regional Mexican Music Album (including Tejano)

- Pecados y Milagros – Lila Downs
- Sembrando Flores – Los Cojolites
- 365 Días – Los Tucanes de Tijuana
- Oye – Mariachi Divas de Cindy Shea
- El Primer Ministro - Gerardo Ortíz

Best Tropical Latin Album

- Retro – Marlow Rosado Y La Riqueña
- Cubano Soy – Raúl Lara y Sus Soneros
- Desde Nueva York a Puerto Rico – Eddie Montalvo
- Formula, Vol. 1 – Romeo Santos

=== American Roots Music ===
Best Americana Album

- Slipstream – Bonnie Raitt
- The Carpenter – The Avett Brothers
- From the Ground Up – John Fullbright
- The Lumineers – The Lumineers
- Babel – Mumford & Sons

Best Bluegrass Album

- Nobody Knows You – Steep Canyon Rangers
- The Gospel Side Of – Dailey & Vincent
- Life Finds a Way – The Grascals
- Beat the Devil and Carry a Rail – Noam Pikelny
- Scratch Gravel Road – The Special Consensus

Best Blues Album

- Locked Down – Dr. John
- 33 1/3 – Shemekia Copeland
- Let It Burn – Ruthie Foster
- And Still I Rise – Heritage Blues Orchestra
- Bring It on Home – Joan Osborne

Best Folk Album

- The Goat Rodeo Sessions – Yo-Yo Ma, Stuart Duncan, Edgar Meyer & Chris Thile
- Leaving Eden – Carolina Chocolate Drops
- Election Special – Ry Cooder
- Hambone's Meditations – Luther Dickinson
- This One's for Him: A Tribute to Guy Clark – Various Artists

Best Regional Roots Music Album

- The Band Courtbouillon – Wayne Toups, Steve Riley & Wilson Savoy
- Malama Ko Aloha (Keep Your Love) – Keola Beamer
- Shi Kéyah - Songs for the People – Radmilla Cody
- Pilialoha – Weldon Kekauoha
- Nothin' But The Best – Corey Ledet with Anthony Dopsie, Dwayne Dopsie & André Thierry

=== Reggae ===
Best Reggae Album

- Rebirth – Jimmy Cliff
- Miracle – The Original Wailers
- Tomahawk Technique – Sean Paul
- New Legend - Jamaica 50th Edition – Sly and Robbie & The Jam Masters
- Reggae Got Soul: Unplugged On Strawberry Hill – Toots And The Maytals

=== World Music ===
Best World Music Album

- The Living Room Sessions Part 1 – Ravi Shankar
- Folila – Amadou & Mariam
- On a Gentle Island Breeze – Daniel Ho
- Jabulani – Hugh Masekela
- Traveller – Anoushka Shankar

=== Children's ===
Best Children's Album

- Can You Canoe? – The Okee Dokee Brothers
- High Dive and Other Things That Could Have Happened... – Bill Harley
- JumpinJazz Kids - A Swinging Jungle Tale - Featuring Al Jarreau, Hubert Laws and Dee Dee Bridgewater – James Murray & Various Artists
- Little Seed: Songs for Children by Woody Guthrie – Elizabeth Mitchell
- Radio Jungle – The Pop Ups

=== Spoken Word ===
Best Spoken Word Album (Includes Poetry, Audio Books & Story Telling)

- Society's Child: My Autobiography – Janis Ian
- American Grown (Michelle Obama) – (Various Artists) Scott Creswell & Dan Zitt, producers
- Back to Work: Why We Need Smart Government for a Strong Economy – Bill Clinton
- Drift: The Unmooring of American Military Power – Rachel Maddow
- Seriously... I'm Kidding – Ellen DeGeneres

=== Comedy ===
Best Comedy Album

- Blow Your Pants Off – Jimmy Fallon
- In God We Rust – Lewis Black
- Kathy Griffin: Seaman 1st Class – Kathy Griffin
- Jim Gaffigan: Mr. Universe – Jim Gaffigan
- Rize of the Fenix – Tenacious D

=== Musical Show ===
Best Musical Theater Album

- Once: A New Musical – Original Broadway Cast Recording
  - Steve Kazee & Cristin Milioti, principal soloists; Steven Epstein & Martin Lowe, producers (Glen Hansard & Marketa Irglova, composers/lyricists)
  - Follies – New Broadway Cast Recording
    - Danny Burstein, Jan Maxwell, Elaine Paige, Bernadette Peters & Ron Raines, principal soloists; Philip Chaffin & Tommy Krasker, producers (Stephen Sondheim, composer/lyricist)
  - The Gershwins' Porgy And Bess – New Broadway Cast Recording
    - David Alan Grier, Norm Lewis & Audra McDonald, principal soloists; Tommy Krasker, producer (George Gershwin, composer; Ira Gershwin, Dorothy Heyward & DuBose Heyward, lyricists)
  - Newsies – Original Broadway Cast Recording
    - Jeremy Jordan & Kara Lindsay, principal soloists; Frank Filipetti, Michael Kosarin, Alan Menken & Chris Mountain, producers (Alan Menken, composer; Jack Feldman, lyricist)
  - Nice Work If You Can Get It – Original Broadway Cast Recording
    - Matthew Broderick & Kelli O'Hara, principal soloists; David Chase, Bill Elliott & Robert Sher, producers (George Gershwin, composer; Ira Gershwin, lyricist)

=== Music for Visual Media ===
Best Compilation Soundtrack for Visual Media

- Midnight in Paris – Various Artists
- The Descendants – Various Artists
- Marley – Bob Marley & The Wailers
- The Muppets – Various Artists
- Rock of Ages – Various Artists

Best Score Soundtrack for Visual Media

- The Girl with the Dragon Tattoo – Trent Reznor & Atticus Ross, composers
- The Adventures of Tintin: The Secret of the Unicorn – John Williams, composer
- The Artist – Ludovic Bource, composer
- The Dark Knight Rises – Hans Zimmer, composer
- Hugo – Howard Shore, composer
- Journey – Austin Wintory, composer

Best Song Written for Visual Media

- "Safe & Sound" (from The Hunger Games)
- T Bone Burnett, Taylor Swift, John Paul White & Joy Williams, songwriters (Taylor Swift & The Civil Wars)
  - "Abraham's Daughter" (from The Hunger Games)
    - T Bone Burnett, Win Butler & Régine Chassagne, songwriters (Arcade Fire)
  - "Learn Me Right" (from Brave)
    - Mumford & Sons, songwriters (Birdy & Mumford & Sons)
  - "Let Me Be Your Star" (from Smash)
    - Marc Shaiman & Scott Wittman, songwriters (Katharine McPhee & Megan Hilty)
  - "Man or Muppet" (from The Muppets)
    - Bret McKenzie, songwriter (Jason Segel & Walter)

=== Composing/Arranging ===
Best Instrumental Composition

- "Mozart Goes Dancing"
- Chick Corea, composer (Chick Corea & Gary Burton)
  - "December Dream"
    - Chuck Loeb, composer (Fourplay)
  - "Music Of Ansel Adams: America"
    - Chris Brubeck & Dave Brubeck, composers (Temple University Symphony Orchestra)
  - "Overture, Waltz and Rondo"
    - Bill Cunliffe, composer (Temple University Symphony Orchestra)
  - "Without a Paddle"
    - Bill Holman, composer (Tall & Small)

Best Instrumental Arrangement

- "How About You"
- Gil Evans, arranger (Gil Evans Project)
  - "Afro-Cuban Jazz Suite For Ellington"
    - Michael Philip Mossman, arranger (Bobby Sanabria Big Band)
  - "Irrequieto"
    - Bob Mintzer, arranger (Bob Mintzer Big Band)
  - "A Night In Tunisia (Actually An Entire Weekend!)"
    - Wally Minko, arranger (Arturo Sandoval)
  - "Salt Peanuts! (Mani Salado)"
    - Gordon Goodwin, arranger (Arturo Sandoval)

Best Instrumental Arrangement Accompanying Vocalist(s)

- "City Of Roses"
- Thara Memory & Esperanza Spalding, arrangers (Esperanza Spalding)
  - "Look To The Rainbow"
    - Gil Evans, arranger (Gil Evans Project & Luciana Souza)
  - "Out There"
    - Shelly Berg, arranger (Lorraine Feather)
  - "Spain (I Can Recall)"
    - Vince Mendoza, arranger (Al Jarreau and The Metropole Orkest)
  - "Wild Is The Wind"
    - Nan Schwartz, arranger (Whitney Claire Kaufman And Andrew Playfoot)

=== Package ===
Best Recording Package

- Biophilia
- Michael Amzalag & Mathias Augustyniak, art directors (Björk)
  - Boys & Girls
    - Brett Kilroe, art director (Alabama Shakes)
  - Charmer
    - Gail Marowitz, art director (Aimee Mann)
  - Love This Giant
    - Noah Wall, art director (David Byrne & St. Vincent)
  - Swing Lo Magellan
    - David Longstreth, art director (Dirty Projectors)

Best Boxed or Special Limited Edition Package

- Woody at 100: The Woody Guthrie Centennial Collection
- Fritz Klaetke, art director (Woody Guthrie)
  - The Girl with the Dragon Tattoo (Soundtrack from the Motion Picture)
    - Rob Sheridan, art director (Trent Reznor & Atticus Ross)
  - Go Fly a Kite
    - Liz Kweller, art director (Ben Kweller)
  - Ram (Paul McCartney Archive Collection - Deluxe Edition)
    - Simon Earith & James Musgrave, art directors (Paul McCartney & Linda McCartney)
  - Some Girls (Super Deluxe Edition)
    - Stephen Kennedy, art director (The Rolling Stones)

=== Notes ===
Best Album Notes

- Singular Genius: The Complete ABC Singles
  - Billy Vera, album notes writer (Ray Charles)
  - Banjo Diary: Lessons from Tradition
    - Stephen Wade, album notes writer (Stephen Wade)
  - First Recordings: 50th Anniversary Edition
    - Hans Olof Gottfridsson, album notes writer (The Beatles with Tony Sheridan)
  - The Pearl Sessions
    - Holly George-Warren, album notes writer (Janis Joplin)
  - Piazzolla in Brooklyn
    - Fernando Gonzalez, album notes writer (Pablo Aslan Quintet)

=== Historical ===
Best Historical Album

- The Smile Sessions (Deluxe Box Set)
  - Alan Boyd, Mark Linett, Brian Wilson & Dennis Wolfe, compilation producers; Mark Linett, mastering engineer (The Beach Boys)
  - He is My Story: The Sanctified Soul of Arizona Dranes
    - Josh Rosenthal, compilation producer; Bryan Hoffa & Christopher King, mastering engineers (Arizona Dranes)
  - Old-Time Smoky Mountain Music: 34 Historic Songs, Ballads, And Instrumentals Recorded In The Great Smoky Mountains By "Song Catcher" Joseph S. Hall
    - Kent Cave, Michael Montgomery & Ted Olson, compilation producers; John Fleenor & Steve Kemp, mastering engineers (Various Artists)
  - Opika Pende: Africa at 78 RPM
    - Steven Lance Ledbetter & Jonathan Ward, compilation producers; Michael Graves, mastering engineer (Various Artists)
  - Ram (Paul McCartney Archive Collection - Deluxe Edition)
    - Paul McCartney, compilation producer; Simon Gibson, Guy Massey & Steve Rooke, mastering engineers (Paul McCartney & Linda McCartney)
  - Woody At 100: The Woody Guthrie Centennial Collection
    - Jeff Place & Robert Santelli, compilation producers; Pete Reiniger, mastering engineer (Woody Guthrie)

=== Production ===
Best Engineered Album, Non-Classical

- The Goat Rodeo Sessions
  - Richard King, engineer; Richard King, mastering engineer (Yo-Yo Ma, Stuart Duncan, Edgar Meyer & Chris Thile)
- The Absence
  - Moogie Canazio & Al Schmitt, engineers; Bernie Grundman, mastering engineer (Melody Gardot)
- Ashes & Fire
  - Glyn Johns, engineer; Bob Ludwig, mastering engineer (Ryan Adams)
- Love is a Four Letter Word
  - Joe Chiccarelli, Steve Churchyard, Lars Fox, Graham Hope, Tony Maserati & Morgan Stratton, engineers; Bob Ludwig, mastering engineer (Jason Mraz)
- Slingshot
  - Helik Hadar, engineer; Bernie Grundman, mastering engineer (Rebecca Pidgeon)

Producer of the Year, Non-Classical

- Dan Auerbach
  - El Camino (The Black Keys) (A)
  - Locked Down (Dr. John) (A)
  - "Savage" (Hacienda) (S)
  - Shakedown (Hacienda) (A)
- Jeff Bhasker
  - Some Nights (Fun) (A)
- Diplo
  - "Climax" (Usher) (S)
  - "Get Free" (Major Lazer featuring Amber Coffman) (S)
  - "La La La" (Snoop Lion) (S)
  - "Lies" (Marina and The Diamonds) (T)
  - "Look At These Hoes" (Santigold) (T)
  - "Push And Shove" (No Doubt featuring Busy Signal & Major Lazer) (S)
  - "Slight Work" (Wale featuring Big Sean) (T)
  - "Thought of You" (Justin Bieber) (T)
  - "Too Close" (Alex Clare) (S)
- Markus Dravs
  - Babel (Mumford & Sons) (A)
  - Mylo Xyloto (Coldplay) (A)
- Salaam Remi
  - "Back To Love" (Anthony Hamilton) (T)
  - "Between the Cheats" (Amy Winehouse) (T)
  - "Girl On Fire" (Alicia Keys & Nicki Minaj) (S)
  - "How Many Drinks?" (Miguel) (T)
  - Life Is Good (Nas) (A)
  - "Like Smoke" (Amy Winehouse Featuring Nas) (T)
  - "Running" (Melanie Fiona & Nas) (T)
  - "Sins of My Father" (Usher) (T)
  - "A Song For You" (Amy Winehouse) (T)

Best Remixed Recording, Non-Classical

- "Promises" (Skrillex & Nero Remix)
  - Skrillex, remixer (Nero)
- "In My Mind" (Axwell Remix)
  - Axel Hedfors, remixer (Ivan Gough & Feenixpawl Featuring Georgi Kay)
- "Lie Down in Darkness" (Photek Remix)
  - Photek, remixer (Moby)
- "Midnight City" (Eric Prydz Private Remix)
  - Eric Prydz, remixer (M83)
- "The Veldt" (Tommy Trash Remix)
  - Thomas Olsen, remixer (Deadmau5 Featuring Chris James)

=== Production, Surround Sound ===
Best Surround Sound Album

- Modern Cool
  - Jim Anderson, surround mix engineer; Darcy Proper, surround mastering engineer; Michael Friedman, surround producer (Patricia Barber)
  - Chamberland
    - David Miles Huber, surround mix engineer; David Miles Huber, surround mastering engineer; David Miles Huber, surround producer (David Miles Huber)
  - Quiet Winter Night
    - Morten Lindberg, surround mix engineer; Morten Lindberg, surround mastering engineer; Morten Lindberg, surround producer (Hoff Ensemble)
  - Rupa-Khandha
    - Daniel Shores, surround mix engineer; Daniel Shores, surround mastering engineer; Marina Ledin & Victor Ledin, surround producers (Los Angeles Percussion Quartet)
  - Storm Corrosion
    - Steven Wilson, surround mix engineer; Steven Wilson, surround mastering engineer; Steven Wilson, surround producer (Storm Corrosion)

=== Production, Classical ===
Best Engineered Album, Classical

- Life & Breath - Choral Works By René Clausen
- Tom Caulfield & John Newton, engineers; Mark Donahue, mastering engineer (Charles Bruffy & Kansas City Chorale)
  - Americana
    - Daniel Shores, engineer; Daniel Shores, mastering engineer (Modern Mandolin Quartet)
  - Beethoven: The Late String Quartets, Op. 127 & 131
    - Bruce Egre, engineer (Brentano String Quartet)
  - Music for a Time of War
    - Jesse Lewis & John Newton, engineers; Jesse Brayman, mastering engineer (Carlos Kalmar & The Oregon Symphony)
  - Souvenir
    - Morten Lindberg, engineer; Morten Lindberg, mastering engineer (TrondheimSolistene)

Producer of the Year, Classical

- Blanton Alspaugh
- Chamber Symphonies (Gregory Wolynec & Gateway Chamber Orchestra)
- Davis: Río De Sangre (Joseph Rescigno, Vale Rideout, Ava Pine, John Duykers, Kerry Walsh, Guido LeBron, The Florentine Opera Company & Milwaukee Symphony Orchestra)
- Gjeilo: Northern Lights (Charles Bruffy & Phoenix Chorale)
- In Paradisum (Brian A. Schmidt & South Dakota Chorale)
- Life & Breath - Choral Works By René Clausen (Charles Bruffy & Kansas City Chorale)
- Music for a Time of War (Carlos Kalmar & The Oregon Symphony)
- Musto: The Inspector (Glen Cortese & Wolf Trap Opera Company)
  - Tim Handley
    - Berlioz: Symphonie Fantastique (Leonard Slatkin & Orchestre National De Lyon)
    - Debussy: Orchestral Works, Vol. 7 (Jun Märkl & Orchestre National De Lyon)
    - Debussy: 24 Préludes (Jun Märkl & Royal Scottish National Orchestra)
    - Fuchs, K.: Atlantic Riband; American Rhapsody; Divinium Mysterium (JoAnn Falletta, Paul Silverthorne, Michael Ludwig & London Symphony Orchestra)
    - Gershwin: Piano Concerto In F; Rhapsody No. 2; I Got Rhythm Variations (Orion Weiss, JoAnn Falletta & Buffalo Philharmonic Orchestra)
    - Hailstork: An American Port of Call (JoAnn Falletta, Virginia Symphony Chorus & Virginia Symphony Orchestra)
    - Holst: Cotswolds Symphony; Walt Whitman Overture (JoAnn Falletta & Ulster Orchestra)
    - Mahler: Symphony No. 1 (Marin Alsop & Baltimore Symphony Orchestra)
    - Roussel: Le Festin De L'Araignée (Stéphane Denève & Royal Scottish National Orchestra)
    - Still: Symphonies Nos. 2 & 3 (John Jeter & Fort Smith Symphony)
  - Marina Ledin & Victor Ledin
    - Americana (Modern Mandolin Quartet)
    - Brubeck & American Poets (Lynne Morrow & Pacific Mozart Ensemble)
    - Delibes: Sylvia; Coppélia (Martin West & San Francisco Ballet Orchestra)
    - Mind Meld (ZOFO Duet)
    - Rupa-Khandha (Los Angeles Percussion Quartet)
    - Weigl: Isle of the Dead; Six Fantasies; Pictures & Tales; Night Fantasies (Joseph Banowetz)
  - James Mallinson
    - Britten: War Requiem (Gianandrea Noseda, Joseph Cullen, Alastair Tighe, Choir Of Eltham College, London Symphony Chorus & Orchestra)
    - Bruckner: Symphony No. 4 (Bernard Haitink & London Symphony Orchestra)
    - The Greatest Film Scores of Dimitri Tiomkin (Richard Kaufman, Whitney Claire Kaufman, Andrew Playfoot, London Voices & London Symphony Orchestra)
    - Massenet: Don Quichotte (Valery Gergiev, Andrei Serov, Anna Kiknadze, Ferruccio Furlanetto, Soloists' Ensemble of the Mariinsky Academy of Young Singers & Mariinsky Orchestra)
    - Rachmaninov: Symphonic Dances (Valery Gergiev & London Symphony Orchestra)
  - Dan Merceruio
    - Arensky: Quartets Nos. 1 & 2; Piano Quintet, Op. 51 (Ying Quartet)
    - Brasileiro - Works of Francisco Mignone (Cuarteto Latinoamericano)
    - Change of Worlds (Ensemble Galilei)
    - The Complete Harpsichord Works of Rameau (Jory Vinikour)
    - Critical Models - Chamber Works of Mohammed Fairouz (Various Artists)
    - The Kernis Project: Schubert (Jasper String Quartet)
    - Le Bestiaire (Celine Ricci)
    - Scarlatti: La Dirindina & Pur Nel Sonno (Matthew Dirst & Ars Lyrica Houston)
    - Two Lutes - Lute Duets from England's Golden Age (Ronn McFarlane & William Simms)
    - Weill-Ibert-Berg (Timothy Muffitt & Baton Rouge Symphony Chamber Players)

=== Classical ===
Best Orchestral Performance

"Adams: Harmonielehre & Short Ride In A Fast Machine"

- Michael Tilson Thomas, conductor (San Francisco Symphony)
  - "Mahler: Symphony No. 1"
    - Iván Fischer, conductor (Budapest Festival Orchestra)
  - Music for a Time of War
    - Carlos Kalmar, conductor (Oregon Symphony)
  - "Rachmaninov: Symphonic Dances"
    - Valery Gergiev, conductor (London Symphony Orchestra)
  - "Sibelius: Symphonies Nos. 2 & 5"
    - Osmo Vänskä, conductor (Minnesota Orchestra)

Best Opera Recording

"Wagner: Der Ring Des Nibelungen"

- James Levine & Fabio Luisi, conductors; Hans-Peter König, Jay Hunter Morris, Bryn Terfel & Deborah Voigt; Jay David Saks, producer (The Metropolitan Opera Orchestra; The Metropolitan Opera Chorus)
  - "Berg: Lulu"
    - Michael Boder, conductor; Paul Groves, Ashley Holland, Julia Juon & Patricia Petibon; Johannes Müller, producer (Symphony Orchestra Of The Gran Teatre Del Liceu)
  - "Handel: Agrippina"
    - René Jacobs, conductor; Marcos Fink, Sunhae Im, Bejun Mehta, Alexandrina Pendatchanska & Jennifer Rivera (Akademie für Alte Musik Berlin)
  - "Stravinsky: The Rake's Progress"
    - Vladimir Jurowski, conductor; Topi Lehtipuu, Miah Persson & Matthew Rose; Johannes Müller, producer (London Philharmonic Orchestra; Glyndebourne Chorus)
  - "Vivaldi: Teuzzone"
    - Jordi Savall, conductor; Delphine Galou, Paolo Lopez, Roberta Mameli, Raffaella Milanesi & Furio Zanasi (Le Concert Des Nations)

Best Choral Performance

"Life & Breath – Choral Works By René Clausen"

- Charles Bruffy, conductor (Matthew Gladden, Lindsey Lang, Rebecca Lloyd, Sarah Tannehill & Pamela Williamson; Kansas City Chorale)
  - "Handel: Israel In Egypt"
    - Julian Wachner, conductor (Trinity Baroque Orchestra; Trinity Choir Wall Street)
  - "Ligeti: Requiem; Apparitions; San Francisco Polyphony"
    - Peter Eötvös, conductor (Barbara Hannigan & Susan Parry; WDR Sinfonieorchester Köln; SWR Vokalensemble Stuttgart & WDR Rundfunkchor Köln)
  - "The Nightingale"
    - Stephen Layton, conductor (Michala Petri; Danish National Vocal Ensemble)
  - "Striggio: Mass For 40 & 60 Voices"
    - Hervé Niquet, conductor (Le Concert Spirituel)

Best Chamber Music/Small Ensemble Performance

"Meanwhile" – Eighth Blackbird

- Americana – Modern Mandolin Quartet
- "Mind Meld" – ZOFO Duet
- "Profanes Et Sacrées" – Boston Symphony Chamber Players
- "Rupa-Khandha" – Los Angeles Percussion Quartet

Best Classical Instrumental Solo

"Kurtág & Ligeti: Music For Viola"

- Kim Kashkashian
  - "Bach: Das Wohltemperierte Clavier"
    - András Schiff
  - "The Complete Harpsichord Works Of Rameau"
    - Jory Vinikour
  - "Gál & Elgar: Cello Concertos"
    - Claudio Cruz, conductor; Antonio Meneses (Northern Sinfonia)
  - "Holst: The Planets"
    - Hansjörg Albrecht

Best Classical Vocal Solo

"Poèmes"

- Renée Fleming (Alan Gilbert & Seiji Ozawa; Orchestre National De France & Orchestre Philharmonique De Radio France)
  - "Debussy: Clair De Lune"
    - Natalie Dessay (Henri Chalet; Philippe Cassard, Karine Deshayes & Catherine Michel; Le Jeune Coeur De Paris)
  - "Homecoming – Kansas City Symphony Presents Joyce DiDonato"
    - Joyce DiDonato (Michael Stern; Kansas City Symphony)
  - "Paris Days, Berlin Nights"
    - Ute Lemper (Stefan Malzew & Vogler Quartet)
  - "Sogno Barocco"
    - Anne Sofie von Otter (Leonardo García Alarcón; Sandrine Piau & Susanna Sundberg; Ensemble Cappella Mediterranea)

Best Classical Compendium

Penderecki: Fonogrammi; Horn Concerto; Partita; The Awakening Of Jacob; Anaklasis

- Antoni Wit, conductor; Aleksandra Nagórko & Andrzej Sasin, producers
  - Partch: Bitter Music
    - Partch, ensemble; John Schneider, producer
  - Une Fête Baroque
    - Emmanuelle Haïm, conductor; Daniel Zalay, producer

Best Classical Contemporary Composition

"Meanwhile - Incidental Music To Imaginary Puppet Plays"

- Stephen Hartke, composer (Eighth Blackbird)
  - "Inura For Voices, Strings & Percussion"
    - Tania León, composer (Tania León, Son Sonora Voices, DanceBrazil Percussion & Son Sonora Ensemble)
  - "Ugis: The Nightingale"
    - Uģis Prauliņš, composer (Stephen Layton, Michala Petri & Danish National Vocal Ensemble)
  - "Cello Concerto No. 2 'Towards The Horizon'"
    - Einojuhani Rautavaara, composer (Truls Mørk, John Storgårds & Helsinki Philharmonic Orchestra)
  - "August 4, 1964"
    - Steven Stucky, composer; Gene Scheer, librettist (Jaap Van Zweden, Dallas Symphony Chorus & Orchestra)

=== Music video ===
Best Short Form Music Video

- "We Found Love" – Rihanna & Calvin Harris
- Melina Matsoukas, video director; Juliette Larthe & Ben Sullivan, video producers
  - "Houdini" – Foster the People
    - Daniels, video directors; Gaetano Crupi, video producer
  - "No Church in the Wild" – Jay-Z & Kanye West featuring Frank Ocean & The-Dream
    - Romain Gavras, video director; Mourad Belkeddan, video producer
  - "Bad Girls" – M.I.A.
    - Romain Gavras, video director; Romain Gavras, video producer
  - "Run Boy Run" – Woodkid
    - Yoann Lemoine, video director; Roman Pichon, video producer

Best Long Form Music Video

- Big Easy Express – Mumford & Sons, Edward Sharpe, Magnetic Zeros & Old Crow Medicine Show
- Emmett Malloy, video director; Bryan Ling, Mike Luba & Tim Lynch, video producers
  - Bring Me Home: Live 2011 – Sade
    - Sophie Muller, video director; Roger Davies, Grant Jue & Sophie Muller, video producers
  - Radio Music Society – Esperanza Spalding
    - Pilar Sanz, video director; Esperanza Spalding, video producer
  - Get Along – Tegan and Sara
    - Salazar, video director; Nick Blasko, Piers Henwood, Sara Quin & Tegan Quin, video producers
  - From the Sky Down – U2
    - Davis Guggenheim, video director; Belisa Balaban, Brian Celler, Davis Guggenheim & Ted Skillman, video producers

== Special Merit Awards ==
MusiCares Person of the Year

- Bruce Springsteen

President's Merit Award

- L.A. Reid

Grammy Lifetime Achievement Award

- Glenn Gould
- Charlie Haden
- Lightnin' Hopkins
- Carole King
- Patti Page
- Ravi Shankar
- The Temptations

Grammy Trustees Award

- Marilyn Bergman
- Alan Bergman
- Leonard Chess
- Phil Chess
- Alan Livingston

Technical Grammy Award

- Ikutaro Kakehashi
- Dave Smith
- Royer Labs

== Artists with multiple nominations and awards ==
The following artists received multiple nominations:

- Six: Dan Auerbach, Fun, Jay-Z, Mumford & Sons, Frank Ocean, Kanye West
- Five: The Black Keys, Chick Corea, Miguel
- Four: Jeff Bhasker, Bob Ludwig, Nas
- Three: Kelly Clarkson, Drake, Kenny Garrett, Chris Gehringer, Gotye, Mark Hall, Hunter Hayes, Janelle Monáe, Matt Redman, Rihanna, Marvin Sapp, Skrillex, Esperanza Spalding, Bruce Springsteen, Taylor Swift, 2 Chainz, Jack White
- Two: André 3000, Alabama Shakes, Matt Bellamy, Big Sean, Gary Burton, Casting Crowns, Eric Church, The Civil Wars, Coldplay, Danger Mouse, Andrew Dawson, Ronnie Dunn, Florence and the Machine, James Fortune, Serban Ghenea, Anthony Hamilton, Calvin Harris, Israel & New Breed, Carly Rae Jepsen, Wiz Khalifa, Kimbra, Greg Kurstin, Lil Wayne, The Lumineers, Maroon 5, Mary Mary, Pusha T, Robert Glasper Experiment, Luciana Souza, Tamia, The-Dream, The Time Jumpers

The following artists received multiple awards:

- Five: Dan Auerbach
- Three: The Black Keys, Gotye, Jay-Z, Skrillex, Kanye West
- Two: Chick Corea, Fun., Kimbra, Mumford & Sons, Frank Ocean, Matt Redman, Esperanza Spalding

Nas had most nominations without a win, with four. Four artists had three nominations without a win: Bruce Springsteen, Jack White, Hunter Hayes and Marvin Sapp.

Two artists received a posthumous Grammy Award: Gil Evans (Best Instrumental Arrangement) and Ravi Shankar (Best World Music Album).

== In Memoriam ==
Dave Brubeck, Leroy "Sugarfoot" Bonner, Andy Williams, Donna Summer, Robin Gibb, Patti Page, Earl Scruggs, Chuck Brown, Davy Jones, Dick Clark, Fontella Bass, Marva Whitney, Jimmy Jones, Cleve Duncan, Herb Reed, Frank Wilson, Hal David, Scott McKenzie, Andy Griffith, Marvin Hamlisch, Richard Adler, Patty Andrews, Dorothy McGuire, Jenni Rivera, Kitty Wells, Frances Preston, Donna Hilley, Rick Blackburn, Doc Watson, Mike Auldridge, Joe South, Ravi Shankar, Mickey Baker, Donald "Duck" Dunn, Carl Davis, Adam Yauch, Jon Lord, Ed Cassidy, Ronnie Montrose, Frank Barsalona, Gil Friesen, Chris Lighty, Billy Strange, Big Jim Sullivan, Jim Marshall, George Marino, John Stronach, Howard Hilson Scott, Al DeLory, Mike Melvoin, Alan Mintz, David Braun, Paul Marshall, Jules Chaikin, Paquito Hechavarria, Yomo Toro, Luis Alberto Spinetta, Elliott Carter, Maurice André, Dietrich Fischer-Dieskau, Claude Nobs, Carrie Smith, Red Holloway, Bob Babbitt, Andrew Love, Bob Welch, Bob Birch and Levon Helm.

== Televised ratings ==
In its original live television broadcast, the ceremony received a 25 share/rating among viewers aged 18–49 and was watched by 28.37 million people.
