= Life Is Good (Nas album) =

- Standard cover; deluxe cover features a browner background

Studio album by Nas
- Released: July 13, 2012
- Studio: 4220 (Hollywood); Conway (Hollywood); EastWest (Hollywood); Instrument Zoo (Miami); Jungle City (New York); Oven (New York)
- Genre: Hip-hop
- Length: 58:12
- Label: The Jones Experience; Def Jam
- Producer: 40; Al Shux; Buckwild; Da Internz; DJ Hot Day; Heavy D; J.U.S.T.I.C.E. League; No I.D.; Rodney Jerkins; Salaam Remi; Swizz Beatz

Nas chronology
Distant Relatives (2010)	Life Is Good (2012)	Nasir (2018)

Singles from Life Is Good
- 1. "Nasty" Released: August 9, 2011; 2. "The Don" Released: April 3, 2012; 3. "Daughters" Released: July 17, 2012; 4. "Cherry Wine" Released: September 19, 2012

Life Is Good is the tenth studio album by the American rapper Nas, released on July 13, 2012, by the Jones Experience and Def Jam Recordings. (Note: The album was first released in Germany on July 13, 2012, before its US date of July 17.) The album was recorded at various studios in New York and California, with guest appearances from rappers Large Professor and Rick Ross, and singers Mary J. Blige, Miguel, and, posthumously, Amy Winehouse, among others.

Producers No I.D. and Salaam Remi incorporated orchestral elements and musical references to both contemporary and golden age hip-hop, including boom bap beats and old school samples. Nas wanted to draw on 1980s hip hop influences in order to complement the nostalgic tone of his lyrics, which he used to vent personal feelings and address moments in his life and rapping career, lending it themes of nostalgia and adulthood. Life Is Good was written after his divorce from singer Kelis, whose original green wedding dress was featured in the cover photo, and Nas has compared the album to Marvin Gaye's 1978 divorce-inspired album Here, My Dear.

Life Is Good received widespread critical acclaim and debuted at number one on the US Billboard 200, reaching 354,000 copies sold by 2013. It also reached the top 10 of record charts in Canada, Switzerland, and the United Kingdom. Three singles were released in its promotion – "Nasty", "The Don", and "Daughters" – along with five music videos, while Nas toured in further support of the album from June to December 2012. In 2020, the Recording Industry Association of America awarded Life Is Good a gold certification.

== Background ==
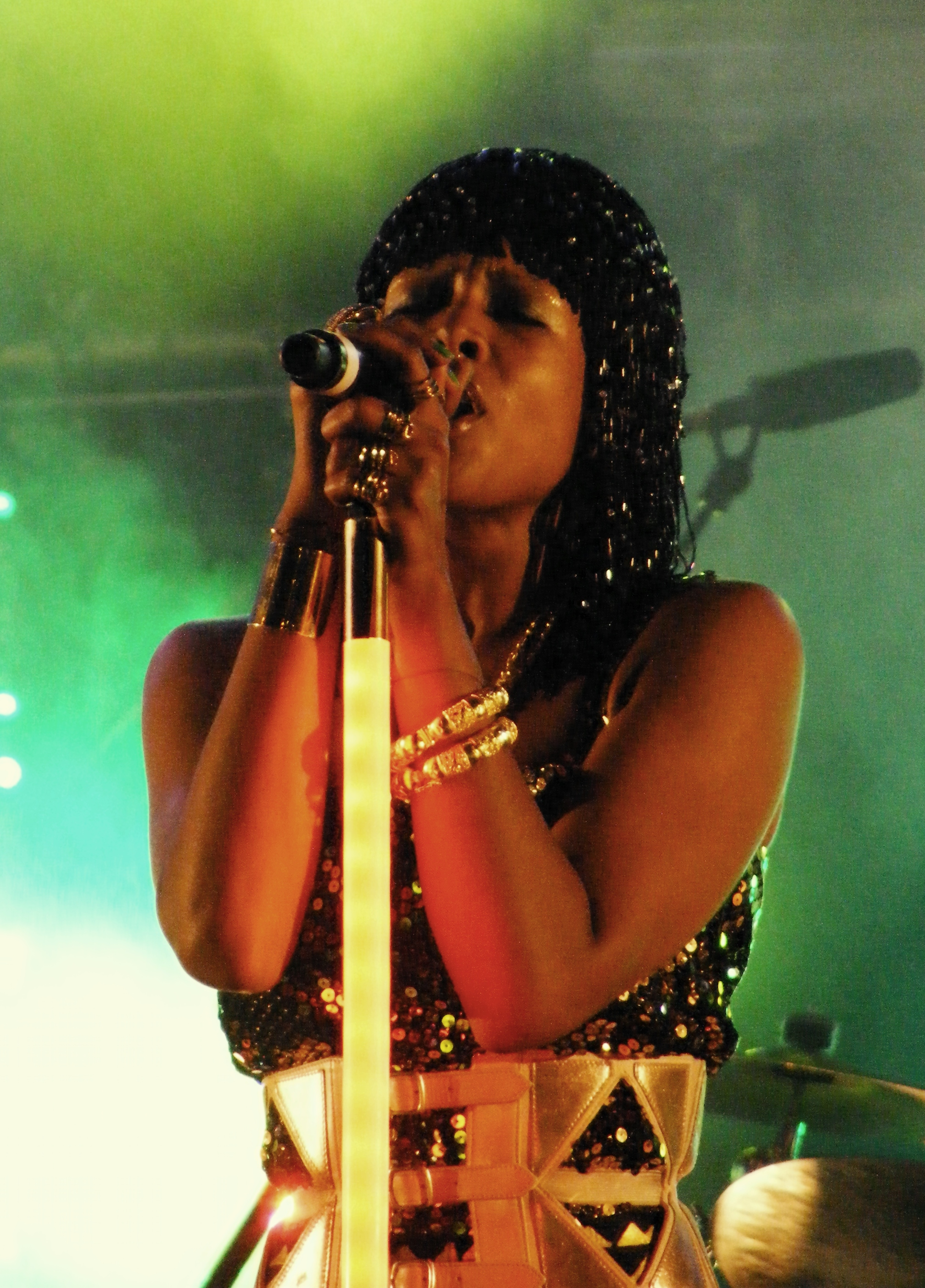
Nas' divorce from singer Kelis (photographed in 2010) inspired much of the album.

In 2010, Nas released his studio album Distant Relatives, a collaboration with Damian Marley that reinvigorated the rapper creatively. He soon became distracted by tax problems and an expensive, highly publicized divorce from his wife Kelis months before their son's birth, events that influenced his direction for Life Is Good. His songwriting on the album was also influenced by adjusting back to life as a single man. Nas also wanted to write more original subject matter rather than another album "about how you came up in the hood and how you had to make it out of the hood". Although he did not find his album "quite so much about the marriage or the divorce", Nas likened Life Is Good to Marvin Gaye's 1978 album Here, My Dear, which was written by Gaye in response to his own deteriorating marriage and released as a financial settlement. For Life Is Good's album cover, a photo was taken of Nas in a polished white suit, sitting in a night club's VIP lounge, appearing forlorn, and holding over his knee Kelis' actual green wedding dress, which he said was the only item she left him.

When writing the album, Nas also reflected on aging and maturation, fatherhood, and his 20-year experience in hip-hop music. Nas discussed the album's personal subject matter in an interview for Billboard:

When I started working on the record, I tried to avoid it. The timing was just calling for me to not avoid all the shit that was going on out there. It was like a 10,000-ton gorilla in the room watching me. This is the way I got it off of my chest. This album talks about life, love and money. It talks about the fact that marriage is expensive. Life Is Good represents the most beautiful, dramatic and heavy moments in my life.

== Recording and production ==
Recording sessions for the album took place at the following recording studios—4220 Studios, Conway Recording Studios, and EastWest Studios in Hollywood, Instrument Zoo Studios in Miami, Jungle City Studios and Oven Studios in New York City, Record One in Sherman Oaks, and Westlake Studios in Los Angeles. Nas worked with several musicians, including Amy Winehouse, Mary J. Blige, James Poyser, Anthony Hamilton, Miguel, Large Professor, and Hal Ritson, among others. For the album, Nas wanted the production to complement his lyrics' nostalgic themes with 1980s hip-hop influences. He primarily worked with hip-hop producers No I.D. and Salaam Remi, a frequent collaborator of Nas. Remi said that he wanted his production "to be something that a mumble-mouth rapper can't rap on. You better have something to say and be speaking up." Along with producer Swizz Beatz, No I.D. and Nas related to the latter's lyrics concerning divorce during the recording sessions.

During the sessions, Nas recorded the song "No Such Thing as White Jesus" with singer Frank Ocean and producer Hit-Boy, who misplaced the track while sorting through music he had produced for Jay-Z and Kanye West's album Watch the Throne (2011). Although he later recovered it, the song was not included on Life Is Good.

== Music and lyrics ==
Life Is Good leaves Nas in his comfort zone, where the vital music of his youth proves a rousing platform for commenting on matters of middle age.

— Evan Rytlewski (The A.V. Club, 2012)

The album incorporates musical references to both older and contemporary hip-hop. Its production features live instrumentation, orchestral music, R&B, and boom bap elements. Music journalist Evan Rytlewski denotes "boom-bap drums, lush keyboards, smooth saxophones, and the occasional Run-D.M.C. and MC Shan sample" to be "tasteful accents" from golden age hip-hop. Ryan Hamm of Under the Radar views that Remi and No I.D.'s production "lean[s] toward opulent and epic", while Pitchfork's Jayson Greene writes that the latter's produced songs "exude the warm TV-fireplace crackle of ... throwback production." Anupa Mistry of Now writes that "boom bap classicists Salaam Remi and No I.D. weave a raw, funky, orchestral lattice customized for Nas's age-appropriate raps".

Life Is Good features nostalgic and adult themes, including aging and maturity. Nas' rapping is characterized by internal rhymes, a relaxed, plainspoken flow, and transparent lyrics addressing moments in his life, including his youth and the personal events leading up to the album. Erika Ramirez of Billboard observes "stories of internal and external battles, some of which he won and some he lost." David Dennis of The Village Voice writes that his lyrics address hip hop's "golden era" and "the trials and tribulations of adult relationships". Brandon Soderberg from Spin asserts that his lyrics "constantly remind nostalgics that the good ol' days were often chaotic and desperate".

Nas' comparison of this album to Gaye's Here, My Dear is appropriate, according to Slant Magazine's Manan Desai: "Like Nas, Gaye was pushing 40 when he recorded his album", Desai wrote. "He'd cemented his position as one of R&B's greatest, and yet, he never sounded more anguished about where all that fame was leading him. There's something similar going on throughout Life Is Good; the more we hear Nas repeat that titular refrain, the less convincing he sounds." AllMusic's David Jeffries said the lyrics about his divorce were "unfiltered carpet bombing of love and marriage"; both Jeffries and Jason Birchmeier of AllMusic characterize the content as "venomous". Conversely, Jon Dolan of Rolling Stone views that Nas "cuts his rhymes with midlife realism and daring empathy". Ken Capobianco of The Boston Globe writes that the songs "mix anger, nostalgia, and insight."

=== Songs ===
"Loco-Motive"
Nas tries to reconcile his growing distance from "the streets", while referencing his financial troubles, on the track.

"Stay"
A modal jazz rap, the song features wooly saxophone, somber bass, and venomous lyrics.

On the opening track "No Introduction", Nas reflects on his impoverished upbringing and maturation into a "graphic, classic song composer". The song's subject matter ranges from lifestyle boats to revolutionary ideals: "Hood forever, I just act like I’m civilized / Really what’s in my mind is organizing a billion Black muthafuckas / To take over JP and Morgan Goldman and Sachs / And teach the world facts and give Saudi they oil back". "Loco-Motive" has an underground vibe and keyboards similar to Nas' 1994 song "N.Y. State of Mind". "A Queens Story" has boom bap and classical elements in its production, including classical piano, orchestral strings and funky drums. Its lyrics pay homage to Nas' native Queens and his creative influences. "Accident Murderers" incorporates pipe organ in its production, and its lyrics addresses senseless violence with a rags to riches narrative by Rick Ross.

On "Daughters", Nas is bewildered at the responsibilities of fatherhood, as he addresses his daughter's social networking activity and worries about his past undermining his parental authority. Killian Fox of The Observer writes that Nas' observations on his ex-wife's "hefty childcare payments" and his 18-year-old daughter "dating unsuitable men" are resonated by his "recollections of his early years as a Queensbridge hustler – just the kind of unsuitable young man he's warning his daughter about these days". "Reach Out" features Mary J. Blige and incorporates the piano loop from Isaac Hayes' 1970 song "Ike's Mood". Its lyrics address Nas' feeling displaced "when you're too hood to be in the Hollywood circles, you're too rich to be in the hood that birthed you". "You Wouldn't Understand" addresses life struggles and features a mellow production and neo soul influences. "Back When" has flickering production and mytholigizing lyrics by Nas: "check out the oracle bred by city housing".

The up-tempo "The Don" samples Super Cat's 1982 song "Dance inna New York" and has a 1990s hip hop sound. Its lyrics extol both Nas' rapping prowess and New York City. According to No Ripcord's James McKenna, "Stay" mixes soul and jazz elements, "bringing to mind Low End Theory era A Tribe Called Quest and Tupac's Me Against the World, and lyrics "questioning the line between love and hate". "Cherry Wine" features vocals by Amy Winehouse and a narrative between ill-fated lovers. The song was titled after Winehouse's guitar, which she called "cherry". Jesal Padania of RapReviews cites it as "quite possibly the best 'ladies number' that Nas has ever delivered, though it is infinitely classier than that label." On "Bye Baby", Nas' lyrics address his ex-wife and recount their marriage in a narrative that follows the wedding, counseling sessions, marriage counseling, and the legal process of their divorce.

== Marketing and sales ==
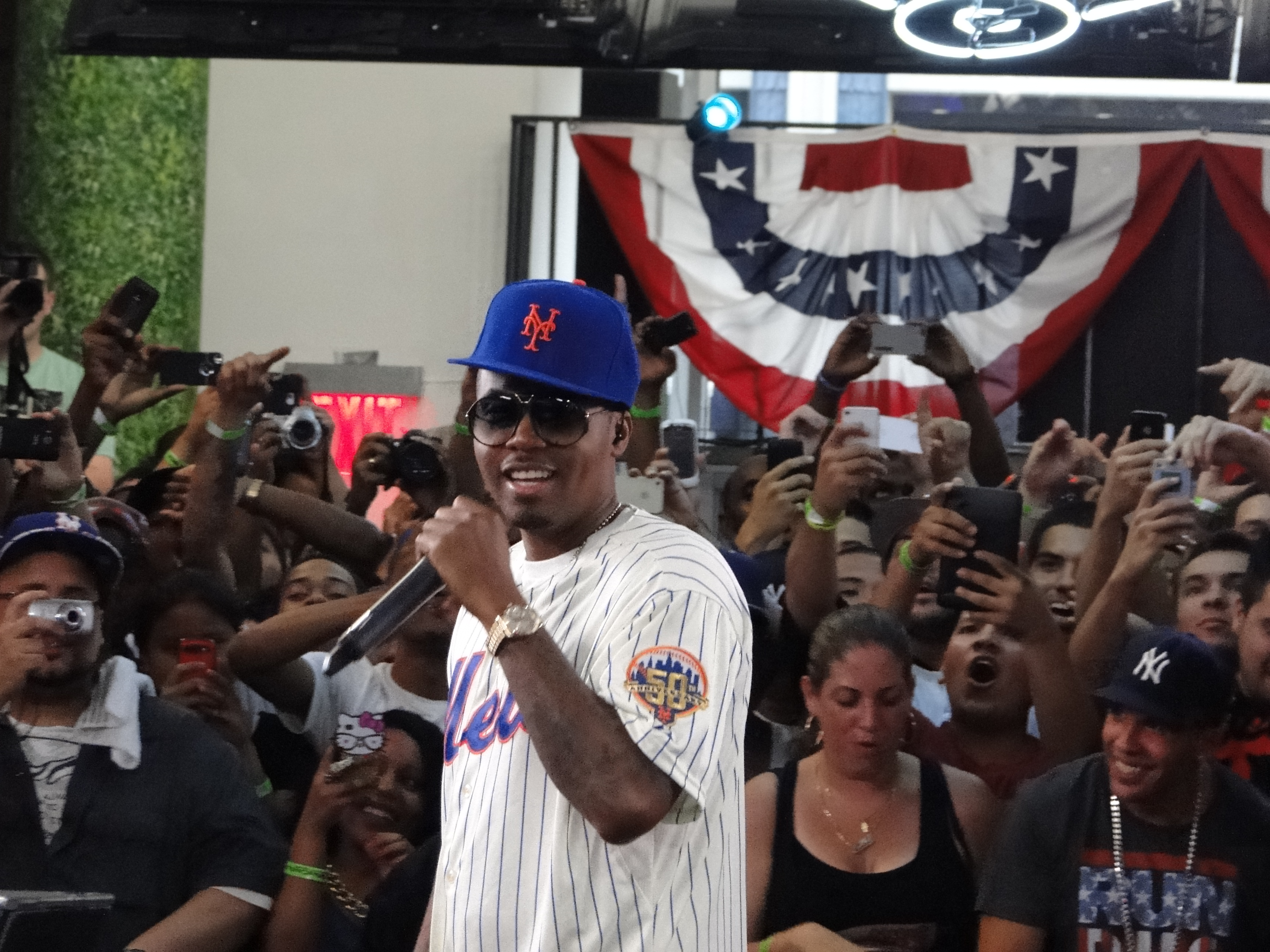
Nas performing in July 2012 at the release party for Life Is Good

The album was promoted by Nas' concert performances and television appearances on The Colbert Report, Late Show with David Letterman, Jimmy Kimmel Live!, and 106 & Park. He headlined the Rock the Bells music festival and embarked on a three-week European tour during June and July 2012. With singer Lauryn Hill, the rapper co-headlined the "Life Is Good/Black Rage" tour from October 29 to December 31. The tour finale was an exclusive show at Radio City Music Hall in New York City with Elle Varner as the supporting act.

Three singles were also released in promotion of the album—"Nasty" on August 9, 2011, "The Don" on April 3, 2012, and "Daughters" on July 17. A music video for "Nasty" was filmed by director Jason Goldwatch in Queensbridge, Nas' hometown in New York, and released virally on October 11, 2011. A video for "Daughters" was directed by Chris Robinson and premiered May 27 on MTV Jams. Its storyline chronicles the relationship between Nas and his daughter through her point of view. On April 27, Nas released the Aristotle-directed video for "The Don", which featured lavish images of Nas' lifestyle. A video promoting "Bye Baby" was released on August 20, 2012, featuring scenes of Nas in an empty home, at his divorce proceedings, and in a setting that revisits the cover image of Life Is Good. It also featured singer Aaron Hall of Guy, whose 1988 song "Goodbye Love" is sampled on "Bye Baby". A video for "Cherry Wine" was also released on October 2. The video was dedicated to guest vocalist Amy Winehouse, who is featured as a projection on a wall in the video's scenes. On September 19, "Cherry Wine" was sent to radio in the United Kingdom.

Life Is Good was released by Def Jam Recordings, first on July 13, 2012, in Germany, where it reached number 24 on the Media Control Charts. In the United Kingdom, it debuted at number eight on the Official Albums Chart, the album also debuted at number two in Canada and sold 5,000 copies in its first week there. In the United States, the album debuted at number one on the Billboard 200 and sold 149,000 copies in its first week. It was his sixth number-one album in the United States. In its second week on the Billboard 200, the album sold 45,000 copies. By February 10, 2013, the album had sold 354,000 copies, according to Nielsen SoundScan. The album charted for 15 weeks on the Billboard 200. On April 21, 2020, the album was certified gold by the Recording Industry Association of America (RIAA) for shipping at least 500,000 units to retailers in the US.

== Critical reception ==
Life Is Good ratings
Aggregate scores
Source	Rating
AnyDecentMusic?	7.8/10
Metacritic	81/100
Review scores
Source	Rating
AllMusic	3.5/5 stars
The A.V. Club	A−
Financial Times	4/5 stars
The Independent	4/5 stars
NME	8/10
The Observer	4/5 stars
Pitchfork	8.3/10
Rolling Stone	3.5/5 stars
Spin	7/10
USA Today	3.5/4 stars

Life is Good was met with widespread critical acclaim. At Metacritic, which assigns a normalized rating out of 100 to reviews from mainstream publications, the album received an average score of 81, based on 30 reviews. Aggregator AnyDecentMusic? gave the album 7.8 out of 10, based on their assessment of the critical consensus.

Reviewing the album in NME, Kevin EG Perry called it "a grimy, back-to-basics return to form", while Pitchfork's Jayson Greene said Nas had "settled gracefully into strengths". Evan Rytlewski of The A.V. Club deemed Nas' lyrics "beautifully expressed" and the music just "as thoughtful", while Slant Magazine's Manan Desai believed the rapper sounded "inspired" and praised the album's "narrative unity" as "a wide-angle look of the artist as a grown man." Ludovic Hunter-Tilney, arts critic for the Financial Times, said Nas draws on his "insider-outsider perspective" as a successful rapper to create "a richly varied album that goes from old-fashioned East Coast bangers to boldly worked orchestral and jazz samples, all held together by Nas's fluent rap technique." In the opinion of Randall Roberts from the Los Angeles Times, the "thoughtful, fierce, honest and – most important – heavy-duty work" showed "Nas has gotten better at rolling with the punches – and you can hear it in every verse". Carl Chery from XXL hailed it as "arguably Nas' best LP since Stillmatic" and proof that "at this juncture—21 years and 10 solo albums in—no other MC has ever rhymed at such a high level this deep into their career."

Some reviewers were less enthusiastic. Robert Christgau gave Life Is Good a three-star honorable mention in his "Consumer Guide" column for MSN Music, citing "Daughters" and "Accident Murderers" as highlights while deeming the record "reflections of a bigshot who, as he mentions several times, is damn big". AllMusic's David Jeffries regarded the album as an inevitably "puff-chested bitch session", "acting as a clearing house for all venom and bile, plus some gloss that doesn't fit but needed to go as well." According to New York Times critic Jon Caramanica, the narratives were "sometimes distractingly fanciful" and Nas' lyrics occasionally "overstuffed", even though the record possessed "a simulacrum of the sound that made him legendary". Matthew Fiander from PopMatters was more critical, finding the production "uneven" and calculated "as product", with "half-done ideas".

At the end of 2012, Life Is Good appeared on several critics' top album lists. It was named the best album of 2012 by The Source and Okayplayer. The album was also ranked number 18 by Rolling Stone, number 12 by Complex, number 16 by James Montgomery of MTV, number six by Martin Caballero of The Boston Globe, and number seven by Jon Caramanica of The New York Times. Life Is Good received a Grammy Award nomination in the category of Best Rap Album for the 2013 Grammy Awards. It was also nominated for Album of the Year at the 2013 BET Hip Hop Awards, while "Daughters" won the Impact Track award at the 2012 BET Hip Hop Awards.

== Track listing ==
Information is taken from the album credits.

Life Is Good standard edition
No.	Title	Writer(s)	Producer(s)	Length
1.	"No Introduction"	Nasir Jones; Erik Ortiz; Kevin Crowe; Kenny Bartolomei	J.U.S.T.I.C.E. League	4:15
2.	"Loco-Motive" (featuring Large Professor)	Jones; Ernest Wilson	No I.D.	3:40
3.	"A Queens Story"	Jones; Salaam Remi; Joseph Simmons; Darryl McDaniels	Remi	4:35
4.	"Accident Murderers" (featuring Rick Ross)	Jones; Wilson; William Roberts; Norman Solomon; Chris DeGarmo; Marlon Williams	No I.D.	4:37
5.	"Daughters"	Jones; Wilson; Patrick Adams; Gary DeCarlo; Dale Frashuer; Paul Leka	No I.D.	3:20
6.	"Reach Out" (featuring Mary J. Blige)	Jones; Dante Franklin; Remi; Rodney Jerkins; Isaac Hayes; Freddie Perren; Christine Perren; Richard Wyatt	Remi; Darkchild; DJ Hot Day	3:46
7.	"World's an Addiction" (featuring Anthony Hamilton)	Jones; Remi; Anthony Hamilton	Remi	5:01
8.	"Summer on Smash" (featuring Miguel and Swizz Beatz)	Jones; Kasseem Dean	Swizz Beatz	4:19
9.	"You Wouldn't Understand" (featuring Victoria Monét)	Jones; Anthony Best; Michael Claxton; Eric Barrier; William Griffin; Tommy Brown; Victoria McCants	Buckwild	4:35
10.	"Back When"	Jones; Wilson; Barry Forgie; Shawn Moltke; Williams; DeGarmo	No I.D.	3:22
11.	"The Don"	Jones; Dwight Myers; Remi; Marcos Palacios; Earnest Clark; William Maragh; Nkrumah Thomas	Heavy D; Remi; Da Internz	3:02
12.	"Stay"	Jones; Wilson; Lester Abrams	No I.D.	3:45
13.	"Cherry Wine" (featuring Amy Winehouse)	Jones; Remi; Amy Winehouse	Remi	5:56
14.	"Bye Baby"	Jones; Remi; Noah Shebib; Tim Gatling; Gene Griffin; Aaron Hall; Teddy Riley	Remi; 40	3:59
Total length:				58:12

Deluxe edition (bonus tracks)
No.	Title	Writer(s)	Producer(s)	Length
15.	"Nasty"	Jones; Remi	Remi	3:04
16.	"The Black Bond"	Jones; Remi	Remi	2:22
17.	"Roses"	Jones; Alexander Shuckburgh; Dan Wilson; Sean Fenton; Nikki Flores	Al Shux; Dan Wilson	3:31
18.	"Where's the Love" (featuring Cocaine 80s)	Jones; Wilson; James Fauntleroy II; Michael Berrin; Peter Nash; Paul Huston	No I.D.	4:28
Total length:				71:37

iTunes bonus track
No.	Title	Writer(s)	Producer(s)	Length
19.	"Trust"	Jones; Matthew Samuels; Matthew Burnett; Jordan Evans; Jamal Sublett	Boi-1da; Burnett^{[a]}; Evans^{[a]}	4:34

Japan bonus track
No.	Title	Writer(s)	Producer(s)	Length
20.	"The Don" (Don Dada Remix)	Jones	Salaam Remi; Heavy D	4:09

=== Sample credits ===
- "A Queens Story" contains samples of "Peter Piper" by Run-DMC and "Queen's Story" by Salaam Remi.
- "Accident Murderers" contains samples of "They Said It Couldn't Be Done" by Norman Feels and "The Bridge" by MC Shan.
- "Daughters" contains samples of "Dust to Dust" by Cloud One and "Na Na Hey Hey Kiss Him Goodbye" by Wayne McGhie and the Sounds of Joy.
- "Reach Out" contains samples of "Ike's Mood" by Isaac Hayes and an interpolation of "Once in a Lifetime Groove" by New Edition.
- "World's an Addiction" contains a sample of "The World" by Salaam Remi.
- "You Wouldn't Understand" contains samples of "Let's Start Love Over Again" by Miles Jaye and "Eric B. Is President" by Eric B. & Rakim.
- "Back When" contains samples of "Double Agent Jones" by Barry Moore Combo, "Live Routine" by MC Shan, and "The Bridge" by MC Shan.
- "The Don" contains elements of "Dance inna New York" by Super Cat.
- "Stay" contains samples of "Seven Steps to Nowhere" by L.A. Carnival.
- "Bye Baby" contains samples of "Goodbye Love" by Guy.
- "The Black Bond" contains samples of "Praguenosis" by Salaam Remi.
- "Where's the Love" contains samples of "Brooklyn-Queens" by 3rd Bass.

== Personnel ==
Credits are adapted from the album's liner notes.

- John Adams – Fender Rhodes
- Richard Adlam – drums
- Angel Onhel Aponte – engineer
- Mary J. Blige – featured artist
- Del Bowers – mixing assistant
- Buckwild – producer
- Brandon N. Caddell – assistant engineer
- Matt Champlin – engineer
- Da Internz – arranger, producer
- Tim Davies – string arrangements
- Gleyder "Gee" Disla – engineer, mixing
- DJ Hot Day – scratching
- Chloe Flower – piano
- Kaye Fox – vocals
- Chris Galland – mixing assistant
- Chris Gehringer – mastering
- Alex Haldi – art direction, design
- Anthony Hamilton – featured artist
- Maestro Harrell – keyboards
- Heavy D – arranger, producer
- Vincent Henry – alto saxophone, clarinet, flute, tenor saxophone
- Jaycen Joshua – mixing
- J.U.S.T.I.C.E. League – producer
- Rich Keller – mixing
- Rob Kinelski – engineer, mixing
- Large Professor – featured artist
- Sam Lewis – assistant engineer
- Tai Linzie – photo coordination
- Omar Loya – assistant engineer
- Kim Lumpkin – production coordination
- Deborah Mannis-Gardner – sample clearance
- Manny Marroquin – mixing
- Miguel – featured artist
- Victoria Monet – featured artist
- Greg Morgan – sound design
- Vernon Mungo – engineer
- Nas – primary artist, executive producer
- No I.D. – producer
- Gary Noble – engineer, mixing
- Keith Parry – assistant engineer
- James Poyser – keyboards
- Kevin Randolph – keyboards
- Red Alert – vocals
- Salaam Remi – arranger, bass, drums, guitar, keyboards, producer, scratching
- Hal Ritson – drums
- Rick Ross – featured artist
- Matthew Salacuse – photography
- Anthony Saleh – executive producer
- Noah "40" Shebib – arranger, drums, keyboards, mixing, producer
- Hannah Sidibe – vocals
- Brian Sumner – engineer
- Swizz Beatz – featured artist, producer
- Meredith Truax – photo coordination
- Anna Ugarte – assistant engineer, mixing assistant
- Cara Walker – package production
- Stuart White – engineer
- Amy Winehouse – featured artist, guitar
- Steve Wyreman – bass, guitar
- Tyler Yamashita – assistant engineer
- Andrew Zaeh – photography
- Gabriel Zardes – assistant engineer

== Charts ==
=== Weekly charts ===
Chart performance for Life Is Good
Chart (2012)	Peak position
Australian Albums (ARIA)	27
Belgian Albums (Ultratop Flanders)	44
Belgian Albums (Ultratop Wallonia)	72
Canadian Albums (Billboard)	2
Danish Albums (Hitlisten)	24
Dutch Albums (Album Top 100)	27
French Albums (SNEP)	33
German Albums (Offizielle Top 100)	24
Irish Albums (IRMA)	55
Japanese Albums (Oricon)	47
New Zealand Albums (RMNZ)	38
Norwegian Albums (VG-lista)	16
Swiss Albums (Schweizer Hitparade)	8
UK Albums (OCC)	8
UK R&B Albums (OCC)	2
US Billboard 200	1
US Top R&B/Hip-Hop Albums (Billboard)	1

=== Year-end charts ===
2012 year-end chart performance for Life Is Good
Chart (2012)	Position
US Billboard 200	90
US Top R&B/Hip-Hop Albums (Billboard)	17

2013 year-end chart performance for Life Is Good
Chart (2013)	Position
US Top R&B/Hip-Hop Albums (Billboard)	82

== Certifications ==
Certifications for Life Is Good
Region	Certification	Certified units/sales
United States (RIAA)	Gold	500,000^{‡}
^{‡} Sales+streaming figures based on certification alone.

== Release history ==
Release history for Life Is Good
Region	Date	Label	Ref.
Germany	July 13, 2012	Def Jam Recordings	
United Kingdom	July 16, 2012	Def Jam Recordings	
United States	July 17, 2012	Def Jam Recordings	

== See also ==
- List of Billboard 200 number-one albums of 2012
- List of Billboard number-one R&B albums of 2012
