= Matthew Salacuse =

American photographer from New York City

Matthew Salacuse (born June 24, 1972) is an American photographer from New York City. His portraits of celebrities and musicians have been published by VICE Magazine, New York Mag, Rolling Stone, and The New York Times. Salacuse attended NYU.

== Album covers ==
Salacuse's photos have been used on the album covers for Life is Good by Nas, and Hot Mess from Cobra Starship.

== The Negative Collection ==
Salacuse hunts for discarded film negatives at flea markets, collecting the negatives for vintage images to print and sell. Many of these negatives have yielded unseen photographs of celebrities like Leonardo DiCaprio, Frank Sinatra, and Muhammad Ali. Salacuse admits that he does not own the copyright to these lost negatives, but maintains a standing offer to return the negatives (and any money received from sales) should the owner come forward. To date, only the photographer for the Leonardo DiCaprio photos has requested to have their negatives returned.

== Commercial photography ==
Salacuse also works as a commercial photographer, with his photos appearing in Bloomberg Businessweek, NME, and Entertainment Weekly. He's also taken photos for advertising campaigns for companies like Coach, Nike, Reebok, and Pepsi.

== Hip-Hop Evolution ==
Salacuse also worked as a cameraman on the HBO Canada documentary Hip-Hop Evolution.
