= Cherry Wine =

Song by American rapper Nas from his 2012 album Life Is Good

Single by Nas featuring Amy Winehouse

from the album Life Is Good
- Released: September 19, 2012
- Recorded: Westlake Studios; (Los Angeles, California); Instrument Zoo Studios; (Miami, Florida)
- Genre: Hip-hop; soul
- Length: 5:56
- Label: Def Jam
- Songwriters: Nasir Jones; Salaam Remi; Amy Winehouse
- Producer: Salaam Remi

Nas singles chronology
"Daughters" (2012)	"Cherry Wine" (2012)	"Free" (2013)

Amy Winehouse singles chronology
"Our Day Will Come" (2011)	"Cherry Wine" (2012)

"Cherry Wine" is a song by American rapper Nas, released in 2012 by Def Jam Recordings as the fourth single from his tenth studio album Life Is Good (2012). The single features vocals by singer Amy Winehouse and was nominated for Best Rap/Sung Collaboration at the 2013 Grammy Awards. It is the final single to feature vocals from Winehouse.

== Writing and recording ==
Speaking to NME, Nas expressed that "Cherry Wine" came from "God, and Amy". Asked if record producer Salaam Remi had "Cherry Wine" from their recording sessions together, he said: "Yeah, Salaam worked on her last album, and they were working. We don’t even have an explanation for how it happened. It was just magic. It just happened. It was supposed to happen. She made it happen." Lyrically, "Cherry Wine" finds Nas expressing his ongoing search for his perfect mate.

== Music video ==
The music video for "Cherry Wine" premiered on October 2, 2012, and portrays Nas as a bartender, while images of Amy Winehouse are projected onto the brick walls of the bar. The video ends with a picture of Winehouse beside the dedication "In Memory of Amy Winehouse (1983–2011)".

== Accolades ==
"Cherry Wine" was nominated for Best Rap/Sung Collaboration at the 55th Grammy Awards in 2013.

== Track listing ==
Digital download

1. "Cherry Wine" (album version) — 5:56

== Personnel ==
Credits adapted from liner notes.

- John Adams – Rhodes piano
- Vincent Henry – tenor, alto sax, flute, clarinet
- Gleyder "GEE" Dida – recording
- Gary Noble – recording, mixing
- Salaam Remi – producer, arranger, bass, drums
- Brian Sumner – recording
- Amy Winehouse – guitar

== Charts ==
Chart (2012)	Peak position
UK Singles (Official Charts Company)	144
UK Hip Hop/R&B (OCC)	27
US R&B/Hip-Hop Digital Song Sales (Billboard)	44
US Rap Digital Song Sales (Billboard)	47

== Release history ==
Country	Date	Format	Label
United Kingdom	September 19, 2012	Contemporary hit radio	Def Jam
