= Bye Baby =

Song by Nas

from the album Life Is Good
- Released: July 13, 2012
- Genre: Hip hop
- Length: 3:59
- Label: Def Jam
- Songwriters: Nasir Jones; Salaam Remi; Noah Shebib; Tim Gatling; Gene Griffin; Aaron Hall; Teddy Riley
- Producers: Salaam Remi; 40

"Bye Baby" is a song by hip hop recording artist Nas, from his 2012 album Life Is Good. The song was produced by 40 and Nas's frequent collaborator Salaam Remi. Sampling "Goodbye Love" by Guy, the song recounts Nas's failed marriage with Kelis.

== Background ==
"Bye Baby" was produced by Noah "40" Shebib and Salaam Remi, a regular collaborator who has been producing for Nas since his 2001 album Stillmatic. Remi and Nas were able to work with 40 through his manager, whom Remi had a close relationship with. Remi sent Shebib the looped sample from "Goodbye Love" by Guy and Nas's vocals, as he subsequently incorporated various elements of the original song, including Aaron Hall's vocals. 40 allowed Remi to lead the production credit, as the original sample was his idea.

== Music video ==
A music video for "Bye Baby" was released on August 30, 2012. Scenes include Nas rapping in an empty home, attending divorce proceedings, viewing old film of his wedding, and imagery that directly references the cover of Life Is Good. The video also features singer Aaron Hall of Guy, whose vocals are sampled from the 1988 song "Goodbye Love". The video was directed by Aristotle Torres.

== Reception ==
The song was highlighted on multiple year-end lists. Billboard critics named "Bye Baby" the 14th best song of 2012. PopMatters ranked the song 60th on its "75 Best Songs of 2012" list.

== Credits and personnel ==
The credits for "The Don" are adapted from the liner notes of Life Is Good.

Recording

- Recorded at: Instrument Zoo Studios in Miami, Florida, and Conway Recording Studios in Hollywood, California.

Personnel

- Nas – songwriting, vocals
- Salaam Remi – songwriting, production, guitar
- Noah "40" Shebib – songwriting, production, drums, keyboards, mixing
- Gleyder Disla – recording
- Brian Summer – recording
- Chris Gehringer – mastering

Samples

- Contains samples of "Goodbye Love", performed by Guy and written by Timmy Gatling, Gene Griffin, Aaron Hall, and Teddy Riley.
