= Nasty (Nas song) =

Single by Nas

from the album Life Is Good
- Released: August 9, 2011
- Recorded: 2011; Instrument Zoo Studios (Miami, Florida)
- Genre: Hip hop
- Length: 3:04
- Label: Def Jam
- Songwriters: Nasir Jones, Salaam Gibbs
- Producer: Salaam Remi

Nas singles chronology
"Ghetto Dreams" (2011)	"Nasty" (2011)	"The Don" (2012)

"Nasty"
The song's uptempo, minimal beat occasionally pauses, amid Nas' boasts of his rapping prowess.

"Nasty" is a song by American rapper Nas. The song, released via iTunes on August 9, 2011, is the first single from his tenth studio album Life Is Good (2012). The song is produced by Nas's long-time producer and frequent collaborator Salaam Remi. The song was listed at No. 37 on Rolling Stone Magazine's "50 Best Singles of 2011", and was also named as the best hip-hop song of 2011 by Rap Genius. The song was later featured on the soundtrack to the 2012 film Project X. It was also featured in the video game "The Crew".

== Recording ==
"Nasty" was written by Nasir Jones and Salaam Gibbs, and produced by the latter under his production name Salaam Remi. Gibbs provided and arranged the use of many of the instruments making up the song's instrumentation, including bass instruments, keys, guitars and drums. The song was recorded by Gleyder Disla at Instrument Zoo Studios—a recording studio in Miami, Florida. It was mixed by Manny Marroquin, Chris Galland and Erik Madrid at Larrabee Studios, Universal City in California. Additional vocals were provided by disc jockey Big Kap, although his vocals are uncredited. "Nasty" was mastered by Chris Gehringer at Sterling Sound, New York City.

== Composition ==
"Nasty" is a hip hop song of three minutes and four seconds in length. The song is backed by a "minimal", boom bap orientated production, with guitars and drums interspersed throughout. Unlike many modern hip hop songs, "Nasty" maintains a simple construction throughout: according to Rob Markman of MTV News, the song consists of nothing more than "hard rhymes over an infectious loop". Evoking many of the "infamous park jams" held in the Queensbridge district of New York City in the 1980s, a disc jockey can be heard shouting "Are y'all ready to see Nasty Nas?" as the song begins.

== Music video ==
=== Background ===
A music video for "Nasty" was filmed in New York City, and directed by Jason Goldwatch. The video is set in Queensbridge, Queens, the district of New York where Nas grew up. While filming the video, Goldwatch wanted to make the imagery featured in the scenes where Nas visited Queensbridge as realistic as possible: thus, he sent scouts to find real homeless people, as well as old women and drug addicts, that could appear in the video.

=== Synopsis ===
The video begins inside a limousine, with Nas' face hidden in shadow. The limousine is then seen travelling through New York City, and shots of Nas' journey – which he is undertaking with two women – are alternated with those of him in a recording studio, performing "Nasty". Upon arriving at the district of Queensbridge, Queen, Nas exits the limousine and walks through the area, observing the life of the inhabitants, which includes some playing a game of craps. After greeting many of the inhabitants and walking with a group of children for a short period, Nas enters the main apartment complex of Queensbridge. He locates a particular room and greets the tenants: after observing them for a while, he walks into a room which is shown to be the recording studio seen earlier in the video.

== Track listing ==
Digital download

1. "Nasty" – 3:04

== Credits and personnel ==
The credits for "Nasty" are adapted from the liner notes of Life Is Good.

Recording

- Recorded at: Instrument Zoo Studios in Miami, Florida.

Personnel

- Nas – songwriting, vocals
- Salaam Remi – songwriting, production, bass, keys, guitar, drums
- Gleyder Disla – recording
- Manny Marroquin – mixing
- Erik Madrid – mix engineer
- Chris Galland – assistant mixer
- Big Kap – additional vocals
- Chris Gehringer – mastering

== Release history ==
Country	Date	Format	Label
Canada	August 9, 2011	Digital download	Def Jam Recordings
United States	August 9, 2011	Digital download	Def Jam Recordings
