= The Don (Nas song) =

Single by Nas

from the album Life Is Good
- Released: April 3, 2012
- Recorded: October 2011; Instrument Zoo Studios (Miami, Florida), Conway Recording Studios (Hollywood, California)
- Genre: Hip hop
- Length: 3:02
- Label: Def Jam
- Songwriters: Nasir Jones, Dwight Myers, Salaam Gibbs, Marcos Palacios, Ernest Clark, William Maragh, Nkrumah Thomas
- Producers: Da Internz, Salaam Remi, Heavy D

Nas singles chronology
"Nasty" (2011)	"The Don" (2012)	"Daughters" (2012)

"The Don" is a song by American rapper Nas. Released as the second single from his tenth studio album Life Is Good (2012), it is produced by record producers Da Internz, Heavy D and Salaam Remi, who all helped write the song along with Nas, although Heavy D died before the song could be finished. Built around a sample of "Dance in New York" by reggae singer Super Cat, a former collaborator of Nas, "The Don" is backed by a boom bap, reggae-tinged production with additional drum and piano sounds. Lyrically, Nas reaffirms his status as a "street poet", addressing the hardships of poverty within disadvantaged societies and the realities of weapon and drug problems.

"The Don" was released to digital retailers on April 3, 2012. Although the song was not commercially successful, charting only in the lower regions of the UK Singles Chart, it received acclaim from music critics, many of whom praised Nas' rapping style and lyrics, especially the realistic persona he conveyed. Some also pronounced themselves impressed with Nas' motivation at such a point in his long career. A music video for "The Don", directed by Aristotle Torres, premiered on April 27, 2012. It presents several aspects of Nas' lifestyle, including performing at concerts, as well as his experiences in New York City, his place of residence.

== Background ==
"The Don" was produced by Da Internz, Heavy D and Salaam Remi – the latter a regular collaborator with Nas on many of his previous songs, including the singles "I Can" and "Made You Look". Heavy D originally presented the song "Dance in New York", by reggae singer Super Cat to Remi in the belief that Remi could create a "crazy" production if he could choose an appropriate part of the song to sample and edit. Nas, who had worked with Super Cat earlier in his career, claimed that Super Cat actually mentioned him in "Dance in New York" on his first listening of the song. Remi began to try and edit the song, and put together the bassline that would eventually be used on "The Don", but could not work with the sample that he had been given extensively: after learning the identity of the original producer of "Dance in New York", Jah Thomas, he paid Thomas in return for use of the song's multitrack.

Remi continued to work on the production while also putting together material for the posthumous Amy Winehouse album Lioness: Hidden Treasures (2011) in London: whilst there, he learnt of Heavy D's recent death, encouraging him to complete the production for "The Don". After Nas received the song, he requested that production duo Da Internz work on "The Don" and edit it further before it would be rapped over. In an interview with XXL, Da Internz called it "an honour that you wouldn't believe" to have worked on the song once they knew of Heavy D's involvement in its conception, as they had wished to work with him before he died: they also praised Nas' attitude in the recording studio, describing "his bars [and] his approach" as "just special". Following the song's completion, radio disc jockey Funkmaster Flex premiered "The Don" on the New York City radio station Hot 97 on March 15, 2012; Def Jam Recordings later released it to digital retailers on April 3, 2012.

== Recording ==
"The Don" was written by Nasir Jones, Dwight Myers, Salaam Gibbs, Marcos Palacios and Ernest Clark, and produced by Myers under his production name Heavy D, Gibbs under his production name Salaam Remi, and Palacios and Clark under their production name Da Internz. Gibbs also provided additional bass sounds in the song's production. The song was recorded by Gleyder Disla at Instrument Zoo Studios and by Brian Summer at Conway Recording Studios – recording studios in Miami, Florida and Hollywood, California respectively. Reggae artists Super Cat and Jah Thomas are credited as writers on "The Don", as a sample of the song "Dance in New York", which the duo wrote together, is interpolated in "The Don". Audio mixing was carried out by Jaycen Joshua at Larrabee Studios in Hollywood, California, with additional vocals being provided by Red Alert. "The Don" was mastered by Chris Gehringer at Sterling Sound, New York City.

== Composition ==
"The Don"
A 16-second sample of "The Don", which covers the beginning of Nas' first verse: the "airy", reggae-tinged production is also heard, with a blended sample of "Dance in New York" by Super Cat audible.

"The Don" is a hip hop song of three minutes and two seconds in length. It begins with the first use of a sample of "Dance in New York" by Super Cat, used as a means of explaining the importance of music to poorer communities. Following this, Nas' lyrics are backed by an "airy", boom bap-orientated production, composed by producers Da Internz, Heavy D and Salaam Remi, containing influences of reggae, while also featuring a prominent "bass thud", staccato drum and piano break – similar in style to much of the production featured on Nas' debut album, Illmatic (1994). Other parts of "Dance in New York" are blended into the song's production throughout. A reviewer for DJBooth felt that the production shared an old-fashioned aesthetic with Nas' previous single, "Nasty", noting that "The Don" "shares its predecessor’s grimy, old-school informed yet forward-looking feel". Ken Capobianco shared similar sentiments about the song's style, observing that it "evoke[s] the sound and feel of New York’s '90s hip-hop heyday". Henry Adaso of About.com noted Nas' lyrics as consistent with his persona of a "street poet", writing that "there are gun threats, car boasts, thoughts of rooftop sex, shoutouts to New York rap pioneers, and references to real drug rings". According to Rolling Stone writer Simon Vozick-Levinson, Nas "deftly" addresses his earlier life by describing "a concise portrait of the artist as a young man". Heavy D, who died before the song was fully completed, is also mentioned by Nas in the song's lyrics, where he notes that Heavy D was the one who came up with the production and the ideas behind it before he showed it to Remi.

== Reception ==
"The Don" received universal acclaim from music critics, with Nas's lyrics drawing particular praise. Rico Barrino of Artistdirect praised Nas's rapping as being able to impress in different contexts, calling his lyrics "both catchy and commanding" and noted his "precise, potent lyrical poetry honed by 20 years in the game". Writing for MTV News, Rob Markman called the production "a sonic departure" from Nas' previous work, but complimented his lyrics as "vintage" and pointed out the consistency of the lyrical quality throughout the song. In his review of "The Don" for About.com, Henry Adaso described the song as "the type of lyrical exercise Nas only throws down once or twice per album", and that songs such as "The Don" gave a case for Nas' inclusion "as one of hip-hop's all-time greats", also picking up on his "assured" boasts and the "quiet confidence" enveloped in his tone. Adaso also expressed a positive response towards the song's production, expressing his surprise that having three different producers working on the song had not led to a "case of too many cooks in the kitchen", writing that "instead, we get a cohesive, hard-hitting, face-melting, reggae-tinged beat". A reviewer of the song for DJBooth wrote of Nas' performance as "at turns wistful, threatening and braggadocious", and praised the production's "compulsively head-noddable groove". In their review of Life Is Good, Sputnikmusic recommended "The Don" to first-time listeners of Nas, stating to be an exhibition of Nas' "incredible lyrical structures" and "how rapidly this guy can punch out the syllables". They also noted it as a "change of pace" from the more downtempo material on Life Is Good. In his review of Life Is Good for Prefix Magazine, Charlie Kaplan called "The Don" the album's "clear highlight" and felt it a fitting tribute to Heavy D's life and work, writing that it "raises a glass to the recently departed overweight lover with a vivid tour of New York rap's classic soundscapes". For the chart week dated July 28, 2012, "The Don" debuted on the UK Singles Chart at number 196.

== Music video ==
=== Background ===
A music video for "The Don" was filmed in New York City, and directed by Aristotle Torres. On April 18, 2012, a 30-second promotional clip of the video was released online, which contained shots of skyscrapers and Nas being escorted out of a crowd of party-goers into a white Rolls-Royce. Graphics then appear, announcing the forthcoming release of the full video.

=== Synopsis ===
The video begins with a shot of a yacht out on water, which then segues to an image of the Statue of Liberty: the words "Nas" and "The Don" have been superimposed in mid-air on the left and right-hand sides of the statue respectively. After quickly moving between various images of New York City, Nas is shown sitting at a table at an open-air restaurant with a female, at which point he raps the opening lyrics of the song. Again, the video moves rapidly between images, this time addressing Nas' lifestyle, with shots of sunglasses, jackets and shirts all featured. Shortly following this, Nas is escorted into a white Rolls-Royce, wearing a white suit. He is then shown standing in a ring of fire set up on the ground, while continuing to recite lyrics from the song.

The video then continues to alternate between three different settings: Nas' journey in the Rolls-Royce, during which he is driven around New York; him standing in the ring of fire, performing lyrics from the song; and him sitting in a club, surrounded by several women, also performing lyrics from the song. Black-and-white shots are then shown of Nas performing at a concert, with many fans shown supporting him. Finally, the video ends with several aerial shots of New York City, and an image of the letter "N" burned into the ground.

== Live performances ==
Nas first performed "The Don" live on March 18, 2012, as part of a set specially organised by video service Vevo at the music festival South by Southwest. At the 2012 ESPY Awards, Nas performed "The Don" as part of a medley of songs from Life Is Good, including "Nasty" and "Summer on Smash", the latter which he performed with rapper and producer Swizz Beatz. On July 17, 2012, as part of an appearance on the satirical television program The Colbert Report, Nas performed both "The Don" and the single "Daughters", a song which also appears on Life Is Good.

== Track listing ==
- Digital download
1. "The Don" – 3:02

== Credits and personnel ==
The credits for "The Don" are adapted from the liner notes of Life Is Good.

Recording

- Recorded at: Instrument Zoo Studios in Miami, Florida, and Conway Recording Studios in Hollywood, California.

Personnel

- Nas – songwriting, vocals
- Da Internz – songwriting, production
- Heavy D – songwriting, production
- Salaam Remi – songwriting, production, bass
- Marcos Palacios – songwriting
- Ernest Clark – songwriting
- Super Cat – songwriting
- Jah Thomas – songwriting
- Gleyder Disla – recording
- Brian Summer – recording
- Jaycen Joshua – mixing
- Red Alert – additional vocals
- Chris Gehringer – mastering

Samples

- Contains elements of "Dance in New York", performed by Super Cat and written by William Maragh and Nkrumah Thomas.

== Charts ==
Chart (2012)	Peak position
South Korean International Singles (Gaon)	46
UK Singles (Official Charts Company)	196

== Release history ==
Country	Date	Format	Label
Australia	April 3, 2012	Digital download	Def Jam Recordings
Austria	April 3, 2012	Digital download	Def Jam Recordings
Canada	April 3, 2012	Digital download	Def Jam Recordings
France	April 3, 2012	Digital download	Def Jam Recordings
Germany	April 3, 2012	Digital download	Def Jam Recordings
Ireland	April 3, 2012	Digital download	Def Jam Recordings
Netherlands	April 3, 2012	Digital download	Def Jam Recordings
New Zealand	April 3, 2012	Digital download	Def Jam Recordings
Norway	April 3, 2012	Digital download	Def Jam Recordings
Sweden	April 3, 2012	Digital download	Def Jam Recordings
Switzerland	April 3, 2012	Digital download	Def Jam Recordings
United Kingdom	April 3, 2012	Digital download	Def Jam Recordings
United States	April 3, 2012	Digital download	Def Jam Recordings
