= Royer Labs =

Royer Labs is an American microphone company known for its ribbon microphones.

== History ==
David Royer designed his first ribbon microphone in 1997 and established Royer Labs the following year.

The R-121 Ribbon microphone contained two innovations that delivered the performance levels necessary for professional studio use. Neodymium (rare-earth) magnets produce a much stronger magnetic field than the AlNiCo magnets used by vintage designs, raising the microphone's sensitivity. High-grade output transformers raise the microphone's signal-to-noise ratio.

The R-121 is also known for its use of Royer's patented "offset ribbon" design, in which the placement of the aluminum ribbon allows it to withstand louder sources from the front of the microphone, as well as giving the microphone a slightly different voicing from front to back.

Royer Labs was the first to develop a phantom powered ribbon microphone, and a tube-ribbon microphone.

== In use ==
Royer microphones have been used on many instruments. Sound engineers have had good results when recording classical guitars, drum kits, pianos, woodwinds, and electric guitars. Users of Royer microphones include Carlos Santana, Herb Alpert, Steve Albini, Ross Hogarth, and Ed Cherney.
