= Daughters (Nas song) =

Single by Nas

from the album Life Is Good
- Released: July 17, 2012
- Studio: 4220 (Hollywood); Conway (Hollywood); EastWest (Hollywood); Record One (Los Angeles)
- Genre: Hip hop
- Length: 3:20
- Label: Def Jam
- Songwriters: Nasir Jones; Ernest D. Wilson; Patrick Adams; Gary DeCarlo; Dale Frashuer; Paul Leka
- Producer: No I.D.

Nas singles chronology
"The Don" (2012)	"Daughters" (2012)	"Cherry Wine" (2012)

"Daughters" is a song by American rapper Nas, released on July 17, 2012, by Def Jam Recordings as the third single from his tenth studio album Life Is Good (2012). He wrote it as a reflection on the growth of his daughter Destiny Jones. It was produced by No I.D. and was one of the first songs recorded for the album.

"Daughters" features lyrics about raising a daughter and vignettes about fatherhood. Nas' lyrics address his daughter's behavioral problems and are self-critical of his parenting skills. No I.D.'s soul-influenced production incorporates samples of Cloud One's 1979 song "Dust to Dust" and Wayne McGhie and the Sounds of Joy's 1970 song "Na Na Hey Hey Kiss Him Goodbye".

"Daughters" was released to positive reviews from music critics while charting at number 78 on Billboard's Hot R&B/Hip-Hop Songs. It also earned Nas two Grammy Award nominations, one for Best Rap Performance and another for Best Rap Song.

== Writing and recording ==
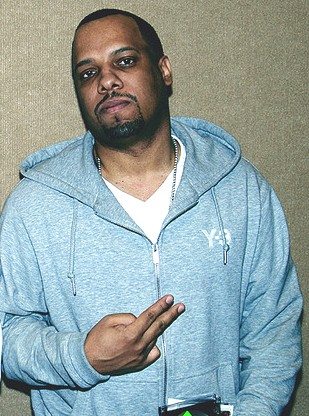
No I.D., the song's producer

With "Daughters", Nas wanted to write a song that expressed him observing the growth of his daughter Destiny Jones, who was 17 years old at the time. Nas said in an interview with XXL:

"She's so important to me and she always has been. They grow so fast and time flies man. Before you know it, you're looking at a little lady. She's my first kid, my first time watching a child become a teen and a little adult before my eyes. That's one of the most important things in my life. She is. I can't get away from talking about it."

"Daughters" was one of the first tracks Nas recorded for his 2012 album Life Is Good. Recording sessions for the song took place at 4220 Studios, Conway Recording Studios, and EastWest Studios in Hollywood, and at Record One in Sherman Oaks, California. It was produced by No I.D., who incorporated live instrumentation, including guitar by Steve Wyreman and keyboards by James Poyser and Kevin Randolph. Kaye Fox sung additional vocals on the song.

Destiny Jones was in the studio when they were recording "Daughters". "We were in a big studio so Destiny was doing other things", Nas later told Vibe. "She walked into the room where I was recording it and heard a few words and said, 'What's going on?' The whole room just started laughing and she kind of smiled and walked backwards out of the room. She didn't know what it was about and she didn't want to listen to it, but later on she heard the song."

In 2025, Nas revealed that he had initially approached Eminem to feature on the single, but he respectfully declined.

== Music and lyrics ==
"Daughters"
A 20-second sample of the song

"Daughters" uses samples of Wayne McGhie and the Sounds of Joy's 1970 song "Na Na Hey Hey Kiss Him Goodbye" and Cloud One's 1979 song "Dust to Dust". According to Artistdirect critic Rick Florino, the song draws on "shimmering" soul music and personal vignettes about fatherhood by Nas, who dedicates the song to "my brothers with daughters."

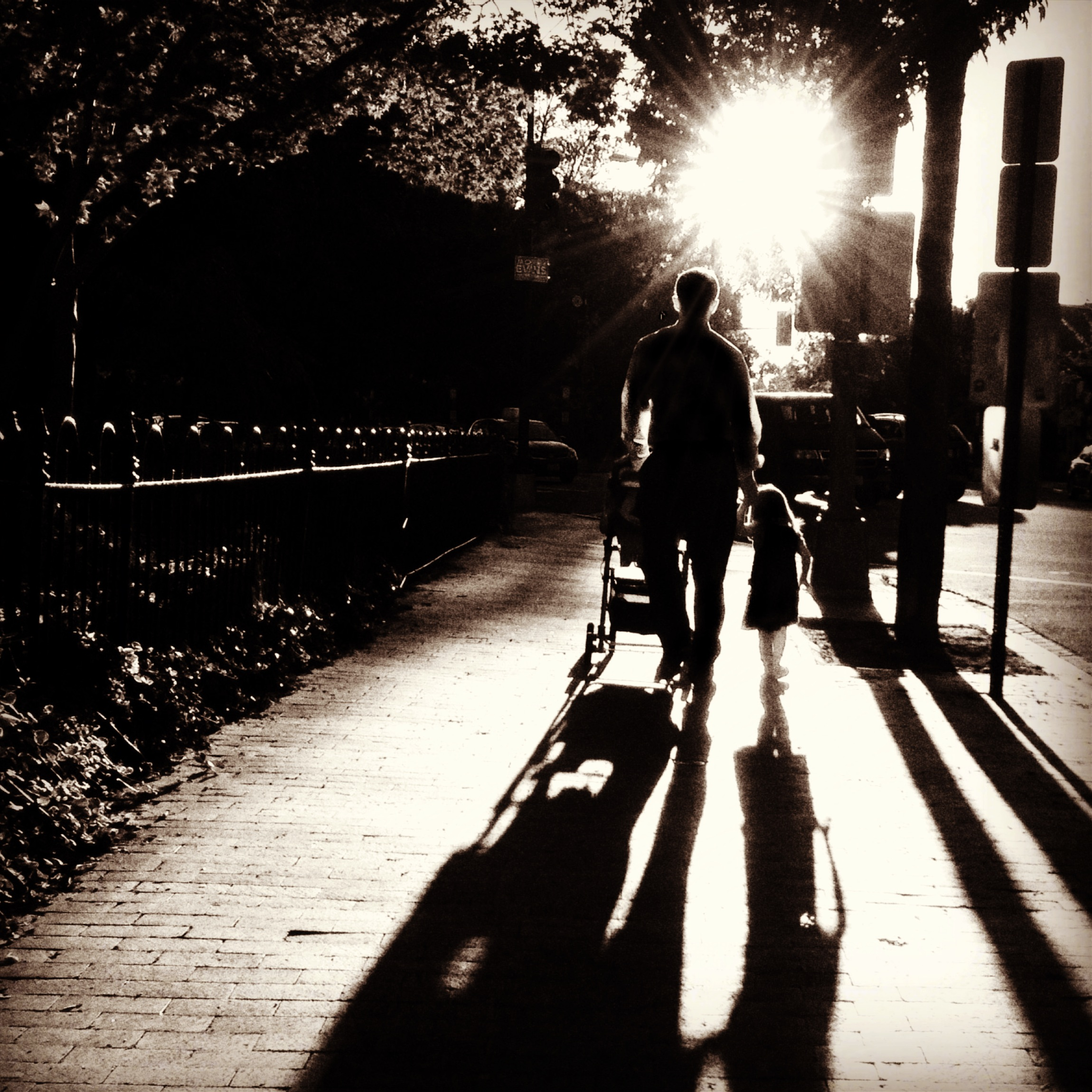
A silhouette of a father and a daughter walking together. The song explores the emotional complexities of fatherhood.

According to Ken Capobianco of The Boston Globe, "Daughters" is "an emotionally complex paean to raising a girl" by a father who "struggles to let her find her way". Pitchfork Media's Jayson Greene said the song "finds him examining the responsibilities of fatherhood with fond bewilderment." The New York Times critic Jon Caramanica remarked that Nas sounded conflicted "between forgiving his daughter her occasional transgressions and indicting himself for not being a stern enough parent". In the opinion of Billboard's Erika Ramirez, he drew on an allegory of fatherhood that seemed universal.

Nas made reference to finding his daughter's letter to a man in jail and the controversy that ensued when she posted a photo of a box of condoms on Instagram. According to Kyle Ellison from Drowned in Sound, Nas also commented on gender expectations in his rap, citing the line "when he date, he straight, chip off his old papa / when she date, we wait behind the door with a sawed off / 'cause we think no one is good enough for our daughters."

== Release and reception ==
"Daughters" was premiered on DJ Prostyle's radio show on Power 105.1 on April 26, 2012. Chris Robinson directed a music video for the song, which premiered on May 27 and was "visualized through the eyes of [Destiny Jones]—from her third birthday party to her high school years to getting into trouble with boys", Rap-Up reported. On July 17, Def Jam Recordings released "Daughters" as a single, the third from Life Is Good. It was performed by Nas on the Late Show with David Letterman that same day. Nas also wanted to record a remix of the song with Eminem, who turned the offer down, explaining that he had spoken enough on the subject of fatherhood in his own music. He also reached out to Jay-Z, but their busy schedules did not permit them to record together.

"Daughters" peaked at number 78 on the U.S. Billboard Hot R&B/Hip-Hop Songs, on which it charted for nine weeks. It was received positively by critics, including AllMusic editor David Jeffries, who found it "well written", and Robert Christgau, who named it a highlight on Life Is Good. Greene deemed it a "sweetly reflective response" by Nas to his daughter's behavior, while Amidon found his level of honesty on the song "intense" and "probably the most honest we're ever going to hear Nas". Alex Macpherson of Fact called it "a song that's as likely to make fathers everywhere misty-eyed as it is to make teenage girls cringe in horror". Respect. magazine deemed it a worthy example of when hip hop transcends its entertainment value in "an effort to celebrate and share the complexities of raising a daughter in the hip-hop community". "Daughters" was nominated for two Grammy Awards, one in the category of Best Rap Performance and another for Best Rap Song. Complex ranked it number 39 on its list of 2012's 50 best songs.

Carmen Bryan, Nas' ex-wife, was critical of the song, calling it a "disappointment" while claiming via Twitter, "He had nothing positive to say about our daughter and his depiction of her is false!" In response, American rapper Common defended Nas for his personal songwriting and likened "Daughters" to his own 1997 song "Retrospect for Life", which he wrote about his girlfriend's abortion. "I've had people come to me because of those type of songs and say it changed their life", Common told XXL. "Or somebody be like, 'Man, that song made me decide to have my child instead of having an abortion.' Something that Nas said in that song may inspire somebody to be a better father so I think it's worth it." In an interview for Vibe, Nas said of his daughter's reaction to the song:

"I think she understands where I was coming from. She can hear me saying that I wasn't always around and I wasn't always the best dad, but I care. And there are a lot of fathers like me. To me, 'Daughters' lets all those fathers out there know, 'Hey, don't end up like me in terms of not being there all the time.' You should really pay attention to the most precious thing in the world. Destiny and I hang out all the time. She never beefs with me about it."

== Track listing ==
Digital single

No.	Title	Writer(s)	Producer(s)	Length
1.	"Daughters"	Nasir Jones, Ernest D. Wilson, Patrick Adams, Gary DeCarlo, Dale Frashuer, Paul Leka	No I.D.	3:20

== Personnel ==
Credits are adapted from the liner notes for Life Is Good.

- Kaye Fox – additional vocals
- Rob Kinelski – mixing, recording engineer
- Nas – composer, performer
- No I.D. – composer, producer
- James Poyser – keyboards
- Kevin Randolph – keyboards
- Brian Sumner – recording engineer
- Anna Ugarte – assistant engineer, mixing assistant
- Steve Wyreman – guitar
