= Hans-Peter König =

German operatic bass

Hans-Peter König is a German operatic bass best known for his roles in Wagnerian opera.

== Career ==
Hans-Peter König studied singing at the Dortmund University Institute of Music, taking lessons from Gladys Kuchta in Düsseldorf. He then trained at the International Opera Studio of the Zürich Opera House. His first engagements took him to various German opera houses, including the Staatsoper Hannover. Other appearances in Germany were Berlin, Hamburg, Dresden and Munich. He has been a member of the Deutsche Oper am Rhein Düsseldorf ensemble since the 2001/2002 season. In 2009, he received the honorary title Kammersänger.

König is said to have an effortless range spanning low D to the high baritone G. He is best known as a Wagner singer, playing numerous bass parts in Wagner operas, including Gurnemanz in Parsifal, King Heinrich in Lohengrin, Pogner in Die Meistersinger, and Daland in The Flying Dutchman. From 2006 to 2009, he appeared as Hagen in Der Ring des Nibelungen at the Bayreuth Festival. Other roles include Sarastro in Mozart's The Magic Flute and Philip II in Verdi's Don Carlos. Starting in 2006, he has appeared in international venues. An engagement at La Scala in Milan was followed by appearances at the Royal Opera House in Covent Garden and the Metropolitan Opera in New York, again there as Hagen.

Since 2010, he has been seen in Spain at the Gran Teatre del Liceu, and France at the Opéra Bastille, in Wagnerian roles. International engagements have also taken him to Stockholm, Helsinki, Taipei, Tokyo and São Paulo. In 2012, he shared a Best Opera Recording Grammy Award for the Metropolitan Opera's Ring Cycle.

== Personal life ==
Appreciative critics describe König as reserved and modest, comparing him to the great basses Frick and Moll. Like them, he is an avid hunter.
