= Marley (soundtrack) =

Soundtrack album by Bob Marley and the Wailers
- Released: 17 April 2012
- Recorded: 1962–1981
- Genres: Reggae, Ska, Rocksteady, rock, dub, soul
- Labels: Island, Tuff Gong

Bob Marley and the Wailers chronology
In Dub, Vol. 1 (2010)	Marley (2012)	Bob Marley: One Love (2024)

Singles from Marley
- 1. "High Tide or Low Tide" Released: 9 August 2011

Marley is a posthumous two-disc soundtrack album by Bob Marley and the Wailers. It was released by Island Records and Tuff Gong Records. The soundtrack features music from the whole career of Bob Marley, his first recorded song, "Judge Not", to the last album he released in his lifetime, "Uprising". Marley was released to coincide with the release of Marley, a biographical film documenting the life of Bob Marley. The album features 24 of the 66 tracks used in the film.

== Track listing ==
Disc one

No.	Title	Writer(s)	Original release	Length
1.	"Corner Stone"	Bob Marley	Soul Rebels (1970)	2:28
2.	"Judge Not"	B. Marley	Non-album single (1962)	2:26
3.	"Simmer Down"	B. Marley	The Wailing Wailers (1965)	2:49
4.	"Small Axe"	B. Marley	Burnin (1973)	4:00
5.	"Mellow Mood"	B. Marley	Non-album single (1967)	3:29
6.	"Stir It Up"	B. Marley	Non-album single (1967)	3:11
7.	"Concrete Jungle"	B. Marley	Catch a Fire (1973)	4:12
8.	"Crazy Baldhead" (Groucho mix)	Rita Marley, Vincent Ford	Rastaman Vibration (1976)	3:11
9.	"Natty Dread"	R. Marley, Allen Cole	Natty Dread (1974)	3:35
10.	"Trenchtown Rock" (live at The Roxy Theatre)	B. Marley	Live at The Roxy (2003)	4:45
11.	"Get Up, Stand Up"	B. Marley, Peter Tosh	Burnin (1973)	3:17
12.	"Work"	B. Marley	Uprising (1980)	3:39

Disc two

No.	Title	Writer(s)	Original release	Length
1.	"Jamming" (live at One Love Peace Concert)	B. Marley	Previously unreleased	9:09
2.	"Exodus" (Kindread Spirit dub mix)	B. Marley	Exodus (1977)	7:42
3.	"No Woman No Cry" (live at The Lyceum)	Ford	Live! (1975)	7:10
4.	"War" (live at The Rainbow)	Cole, Carlton Barrett	Exodus (2001, deluxe edition)	7:53
5.	"I Shot the Sheriff" (live at The Lyceum)	B. Marley	Live! (1975)	5:26
6.	"Roots, Rock, Reggae"	Ford	Rastaman Vibration (1976)	3:37
7.	"Three Little Birds"	B. Marley	Exodus (1977)	3:00
8.	"Real Situation" (Groucho mix)	B. Marley	Uprising (1980)	3:09
9.	"Could You Be Loved"	B. Marley	Uprising (1980)	3:56
10.	"One Love/People Get Ready"	B. Marley, Curtis Mayfield	Exodus (1977)	2:53
11.	"Redemption Song"	B. Marley	Uprising (1980)	3:49
12.	"High Tide or Low Tide"	B. Marley	Songs of Freedom (1992)	4:10

== Charts ==
Chart performance
Chart (2012)	Peak position
Austrian Albums (Ö3 Austria)	41
Belgian Albums (Ultratop Flanders)	143
Belgian Albums (Ultratop Wallonia)	103
Canadian Albums (Nielsen SoundScan)	88
Dutch Albums (Album Top 100)	21
French Albums (SNEP)	56
Irish Albums (IRMA)	39
Scottish Albums (Official Charts)	90
Swiss Albums (Schweizer Hitparade)	38
UK Albums (Official Charts)	81
UK Soundtrack Albums (Official Charts)	2
US Billboard 200	120
US Reggae Albums (Billboard)	1
US Soundtrack Albums (Billboard)	6
