= Weldon Kekauoha =

Hawaiian singer and songwriter

- Born: August 21, 1967 (age 58); Honolulu, Hawaii, U.S.

Weldon Kekauoha (born August 21, 1967, in Honolulu, Hawaii) is a Grammy Award nominated, multi Na Hoku Hanohano Award winning Hawaiian singer, songwriter. and recording artist.

Young Weldon showed interest in music since a young age so his mother took him to sing in Honolulu Boy Choir, which took him into tours in the mainland, Canada and Mexico. At the age four he received his first ukulele.

In 1993 Kekauoha became a member of Mana‘o Company's reconstructed version. Kekauoha released his first solo album called Hawaiian Man in 2000.

Kekauoha has said that music in particular has been a very important element of saving Native Hawaiian culture. Since 2020 Kekauoha has lived on Big Island with his wife Yuko Kekauoha.
