= Wayne McGhie and the Sounds of Joy =

Wayne McGhie and the Sounds of Joy was a Canadian funk band from Toronto, Ontario, in the 1970s. Although they released only one self-titled album in 1970, and had no significant commercial success at the time, renewed interest in their music was sparked in the 2000s when the album was reissued on Light in the Attic Records.

== Musical career ==
Born in 1947 in Montego Bay, Jamaica, McGhie was a childhood friend of Jay Douglas, and played in reggae bands before both moved to Toronto as part of the late 1960s influx of Caribbean musicians to Canada alongside figures such as Lloyd Delpratt, Jo Jo Bennett and Jackie Mittoo. In Toronto, his own music evolved from reggae to fit the R&B-based Toronto sound scene of the time.

His band recorded the self-titled solo album in 1969, and released it in 1970 on Birchmount Records. In addition to original music, the album included covers of rock and pop songs such as Steam's "Na Na Hey Hey Kiss Him Goodbye", Jimmy Webb's "By the Time I Get to Phoenix" and Glen Campbell's "Take a Letter Maria". The album sold poorly, however, and a fire at the Quality Records warehouse destroyed most of the stock.

McGhie continued recording in the 1970s, and was associated with a band called RAM, but had little success; by the early 1980s, he was suffering from mental health issues, and disappeared from music and lost touch with most of his friends and family. He ran into Douglas once in the 1990s, with the two spending an hour or so talking and reminiscing, but did not remain in touch.

However, after hip hop emerged in the 1980s, the album's rich, highly sample-worthy mix of rhythm and blues, soul, funk and reggae influences made the few surviving copies a highly prized possession among hip hop producers and collectors, with original copies selling for up to $800 and even second-hand cassette dubs sometimes selling for over $100.

== Reissue ==
When Light in the Attic's Kevin "Sipreano" Howes wanted to reissue the self-titled album in the early 2000s, he contacted Douglas, who was able to track McGhie down by finding his sister Merline, with whom he was living in Scarborough. He was entirely unaware of how prized his album had become among record collectors, and in fact had not even heard it himself in decades.

With the original master tapes lost, the album had to be remastered from a vinyl copy. It was released on Light in the Attic in 2004.

Light in the Attic also subsequently released the compilation album Jamaica to Toronto: Soul, Funk & Reggae 1967-1974. Amongst the 16 tracks, featured were McGhie's "Fire (She Need Water)" from his self-titled album; RAM's 1973 single "Love Is The Answer" (written and sung by McGhie); McGhie's previously unreleased solo recording "Here We Go Again"; and three other songs penned by McGhie ("Chips-Chicken-Banana Split" by JoJo and the Fugitives, "Mr. Fortune" by The Mighty Pope, and "African Wake" by Johnnie Osbourne.)

McGhie died in July 2017.

== Legacy ==
Artists who sampled from the album in their own recordings included Ghetto Concept ("Certified"), Nas ("Daughters"), Cypress Hill ("Band of Gypsies"), Psycho Realm ("Forget the Faces") and Flying Lotus ("Cry for Help").

The album was a nominee for the Slaight Family Polaris Heritage Prize, an award to honour classic albums, at the 2022 Polaris Music Prize.
