= Frank Barsalona =

- Born: March 31, 1938
- Died: November 22, 2012 (aged 74)
- Awards: Member of the Rock and Roll Hall of Fame

Frank Barsalona (March 31, 1938 – November 22, 2012) was an American talent agent and founder of the first major rock and roll booking agency in the United States.

== Career ==
Barsalona started out in the mail room at GAC, a New York-based talent agency, and became the company's youngest agent. In 1964, Barsalona founded Premier Talent Agency (sold to William Morris Agency in 2002) which was the first booking agency to focus on rock performers. At Premier, Barsalona encouraged young, enthusiastic promoters around the country to present emerging artists at their local venues which created the foundation of the modern-day concert touring business. The promoters Barsalona mentored and worked with became some of the most powerful promoters in the industry, and still are today. The roster of artists at Premier Talent numbered in the hundreds and included Bruce Springsteen & the E Street Band, U2, The Who, Led Zeppelin, The Yardbirds, Jimi Hendrix, Bon Jovi, Santana, Jethro Tull, Peter Frampton, Humble Pie, Van Halen, Herman's Hermits, Tom Petty and the Heartbreakers, The J. Geils Band, Black Sabbath, Yes, Talking Heads, The B-52's, Eurythmics, The Pretenders, Cyndi Lauper, Keith Richards, Jeff Beck, Sex Pistols, Skid Row, Journey, Earth, Wind & Fire, Emerson, Lake & Palmer, Foghat, Traffic, Fleetwood Mac, and Grand Funk Railroad, among many others. Barsalona was also a part owner in various radio stations in the Northeast, and part owner and president of the Philadelphia Fury soccer team (1977–1980).

Rock journalist Dave Marsh wrote, "Frank Barsalona had a vision: acts and promoters and record companies working in coordination to build careers. Rock performers now had an economic base outside of the record companies, they had the time and money and facilities to upgrade the quality of their shows."

Barsalona was a founding member and board member of the Rock and Roll Hall of Fame and was inducted into the Hall of Fame in the Non-Performer category in 2005 and received the Lifetime Achievement Award. He is the only agent to have been inducted into the Hall of Fame to date. Among other industry and humanitarian awards, Frank received the Billboard Legend of Live Award for lifetime achievement, Performance Touring Hall of Fame Award, and the Nordoff-Robbins Foundation Silver Clef Award which was presented to him by Bono and Bruce Springsteen, with Pete Townshend congratulating his old friend and telling stories via video.

After Barsolona's death, his daughter Nicole hosted a memorial celebration to honor his life on April 25, 2013, in New York, bringing together music industry leaders from around the world. Billboard magazine's exclusive coverage described the event: "The room was packed with legends, among them famed E Street Band guitarist Steve Van Zandt, Team Springsteen players Barry Bell and Barbara Carr, and a wealth of promoters, signifying Barsalona's influence in bringing order and legitimacy to that sector. Promoters in the house included Seth Hurwitz (I.M.P.), Gregg Perloff (Another Planet), Jules Belkin (Belkin Productions), Danny Zelisko (DZP), John Scher (Metropolitan Talent), Debra Rathwell (AEG Live) and leading Japanese promoter Mr. Udo, Udo Artists. Among those offering up stories on Barsalona were music journalist Dave Marsh, famed Philadelphia promoter Larry Magid, U2 manager Paul McGuinness, CAA managing partner Rob Light, British manager Peter Rudge, legendary New York promoter Ron Delsener, Canadian promoter Donald K. Donald, Joel Peresman of the Rock and Roll Hall of Fame, Boston promoter Don Law, artists Bono and Pete Townshend (via video)."

=== Personal life ===
Born and raised on Staten Island, Barsalona began supporting his family at age nine by traveling around the country yodeling with a country and western act known as Rosalie Allen's Touring All-Stars. He attended and put himself through Wagner College and St. John's University.

Known for his honesty, integrity, and warmth, Barsalona was once told by British agent Harold Davison that he wouldn't survive in the industry because he was too honest. Proving him wrong, Barsalona became known as one of the most honest and successful professionals in the industry to date.

His wife, June Barsalona (maiden name Harris), worked as a features and news editor within the London Daily Mirror Group and conducted the first interview in the UK with The Beatles for Disc magazine. June acted as an American correspondent for all of the London Daily Mirror Group's music publications and conducted interviews with The Who, The Rolling Stones, Dick Clark, Nat King Cole, Roy Orbison, and many others. In 1968, June went to work for Atlantic Records to launch the debut Led Zeppelin campaign. June stayed on to handle international public relations for Atlantic where she worked with artists like Cream, The Rascals, and others. Frank and June met through their work in the industry and were married for 46 years. Frank was survived by June and their only daughter, Nicole Barsalona.
