= Matt Flinner =

- Born: Matthew Warren Flinner; March 14, 1969 (age 57); Pueblo, Colorado
- Genres: Folk music, bluegrass music, acoustic music, classical music
- Occupation: Musician
- Instruments: Mandolin, banjo
- Years active: 1990–present
- Label: Compass
- Website: mattflinner.com

Matthew Warren Flinner is an American mandolinist, music transcriber, and ensemble leader. Mike Marshall has called him "one of the truly great young mandolinists of our generation."

== Biography ==
=== Early years ===
Flinner's first musical experiences were in Salt Lake as well. At age 10, his older brother Rex taught him how to play the banjo, and then the mandolin soon after. They formed the original Matt Flinner Trio, and played bluegrass music for tips.

When his father hosted a bluegrass show on KRCL-FM in Salt Lake City, Flinner assisted in music selection.

At age 12, Flinner joined the Peewee Pickers, who play bluegrass festivals and watched heroes perform, including the Osborne Brothers, Ralph Stanley, The Country Gentlemen, J. D. Crowe, and Doyle Lawson.

Flinner won the Walnut Valley National Championship in Winfield, Kansas for bluegrass banjo in 1990 and the following year for mandolin.

Flinner earned a Bachelor of Music degree in composition from University of Utah , studying with Morris Rosenzweig and performing with the Utah Symphony.

=== Sugarbeat ===
Flinner joined banjoist Tony Furtado's band Sugarbeat in the early 90s. Sugarbeat also featured lead vocalist and guitarist Ben Demerath (vocals, guitar), and Sally Truitt (bass). Sugarbeat won first place at the Telluride Bluegrass Festival in 1992.

=== Modern Mandolin Quartet ===
Flinner moved to Nashville in 1999, and in 2002 he joined the Modern Mandolin Quartet, a chamber group that uses two mandolins, a mandola, and a mandocello to perform classical and contemporary compositions. With Flinner, they released a re-recorded version of The Nutcracker Suite. Along with Flinner, members include Dana Rath, Paul Binkley, and Adam Roszkiewicz.

In 2013, their album Americana was nominated for three Grammy awards: Best Chamber Music/Small Ensemble Performance, Best Engineered Album, and Classical Producer Of The Year.

=== Matt Flinner Trio ===
Flinner formed The Matt Flinner Trio in 2006. Besides Flinner, the trio includes Ross Martin (guitar) and Eric Thorin (bass). For their Music du Jour shows, each member of the trio will compose a new song on the night before the performance and perform each new song at the show.

In 2009, their first album Music du Jour included what they considered to be the best songs composed for the Music du Jour shows.

The trio's 2016 album Traveling Roots features 12 more songs from the Music du Jour tours: four from each trio member.

=== Phillips, Grier & Flinner ===
Todd Phillips, David Grier, and Matt Flinner perform, record, and tour as a trio. Their first album Phillips, Grier & Flinner was released in 1999.

On their follow-up Looking Back, the trio cover songs such as Bill Monroe's "Tennessee Blues" and "Monroe's Hornpipe," Mongo Santamaría's "Afro Blue," and McCoy Tyner's "Search for Peace."

=== Recordings ===
Released in 1999, The View From Here was produced by Todd Phillips (bass) and featured David Grier (guitar), Jerry Douglas (resonator guitar), and fiddlers Stuart Duncan, Darol Anger, and Tim O'Brien.

Latitude in 2001 again included the assistance of Anger, Duncan on fiddle, Douglas, Grier, Phillips.

=== Matt Flinner Quartet ===
Flinner plays lead mandolin in his electric rock-influenced band The Matt Flinner Quartet, influenced by Miles Davis and John Scofield. The quartet includes Gawain Mathews (guitar), Sam Bevan (bass), and Aaron Johnston (drums).

=== Other projects ===
Flinner was a featured soloist with Trey Anastasio during the Nashville Chamber Orchestra's performance of Don Hart's "Concertino for Strings, Two Mandolins and Guitar" with guitarist Roger Hudson and mandolinist Carlo Aonzo.

When the band Leftover Salmon lost founding member Mark Vann to cancer in 2002, Flinner played banjo as a substitute until the band was able to reorganize.

Flinner was featured on Steve Martin's album The Crow, which won the 2009 Grammy Award for Best Bluegrass Album.

Flinner also occasionally performs and tours with Darrell Scott, Frank Vignola, David Grier, Alison Brown, Missy Raines, the Nashville Mandolin Ensemble, and the Ying Quartet.

=== Personal life ===
Flinner lives with his wife Wendy in Vermont and teaches mandolin through his online Bluegrass Mandolin 101 program.

== Discography ==
=== Solo albums ===
- 1998: The View From Here (Compass)
- 2001: Latitude (Compass)

=== Matt Flinner Trio ===
- 2009: Music du Jour (Compass)
- 2012: Winter Harvest (Compass)
- 2016: Traveling Roots (Compass)

=== Matt Flinner Quartet ===
2003: Walking On the Moon (Compass)

=== Todd Phillips, David Grier, and Matt Flinner ===
- 1999: Todd Phillips, David Grier & Matt Flinner (Compass)
- 2002: Looking Back (Compass)

=== Modern Mandolin Quartet ===
- 2010: The Nutcracker Suite and other arrangements from Delibes, Faure, Llobet & Vivaldi (Sono Luminus)
- 2012: Americana (Sono Luminus)

=== Sugarbeat ===
- 1993: Sugarbeat (Planet Bluegrass)

=== Peewee Pickers ===
- 1982: Getting Goin' (self-released)

=== Also appears on ===
- 1994: Douglas Spotted Eagle - Common Ground (Natural Visions)
- 1994: Tim O'Brien - Away Out on the Mountain (Sugar Hill) with Mollie O'Brien
- 1995: Kate MacLeod - Trying to Get It Right (Waterbug)
- 1995: Salamander Crossing - Salamander Crossing (Signature Sounds)
- 1996: Judith Edelman - Perfect World (Compass)
- 1997: Nancy Hanson - Drops in a Bucket (Small Box)
- 1997: Ben Winship - One Shoe Left (Snake River)
- 1997: Kate MacLeod - Constant Emotion (Waterbug)
- 1997: Chris Proctor - Only Now (Flying Fish)
- 1998: Judith Edelman - Only Sun (Compass)
- 1999: Anke Summerhill - The Roots Run Deep (Independent Songwriters)
- 2000: Alison Brown - Fair Weather (Compass)
- 2000: Judith Edelman - Drama Queen (Compass)
- 2001: Brenn Hill - Call You Cowboy (Real West)
- 2001: Jake Schepps - An Evening in the Village: The Music of Béla Bartók (Fine Mighty)
- 2003: Natalie MacMaster - Blueprint (Rounder)
- 2004: Noam Pikelny - In the Maze (Compass)
- 2004: K. C. Groves - Something Familiar (Skylark Sounds)
- 2004: Brenn Hill - Endangered (Real West)
- 2005: Drew Emmitt - Across the Bridge (Compass)
- 2005: Armando Zuppa - Zupperman (Very Independent)
- 2007: Tim Carter - Bang Bang (Tree O Music)
- 2009: John Cowan - Comfort and Joy (eOne)
- 2009: Steve Martin - The Crow: New Songs for the 5-String Banjo (Rounder)
- 2009: Missy Raines - Inside Out (Compass)
- 2009: The Vignola Collective Gypsy Grass (Dance Research)
- 2011: various artists - Pa's Fiddle: Charles Ingalls, American Fiddler (Thirty Tigers)
- 2013: Craig Duncan - Blue Suede Bluegrass (Green Hill)
- 2014: David Benedict - Into the True Country (self-released)

=== Music Publications ===
- 1999: In The Pines: 13 Classic Old-Time Instrumentals (Mel Bay) ISBN 9780786641161
- 2006: Mike Marshall - The Mike Marshall Collection (Mel Bay) ISBN 9780786670598 - provided transcription
- 2007: All Star Bluegrass Jam Along for Mandolin Book/CD (Homespun ISBN 9781597731263
- 2009: Roland White & Diane Bouska: The Essential Clarence White Bluegrass Guitar Leads (Diane and Roland Music) ISBN 9780982114629 - with Steve Pottier and Matt Flinner
- 2011: The Real Bluegrass Book (Hal Leonard) ISBN 9780634049217
