= Psychograss =

American bluegrass band

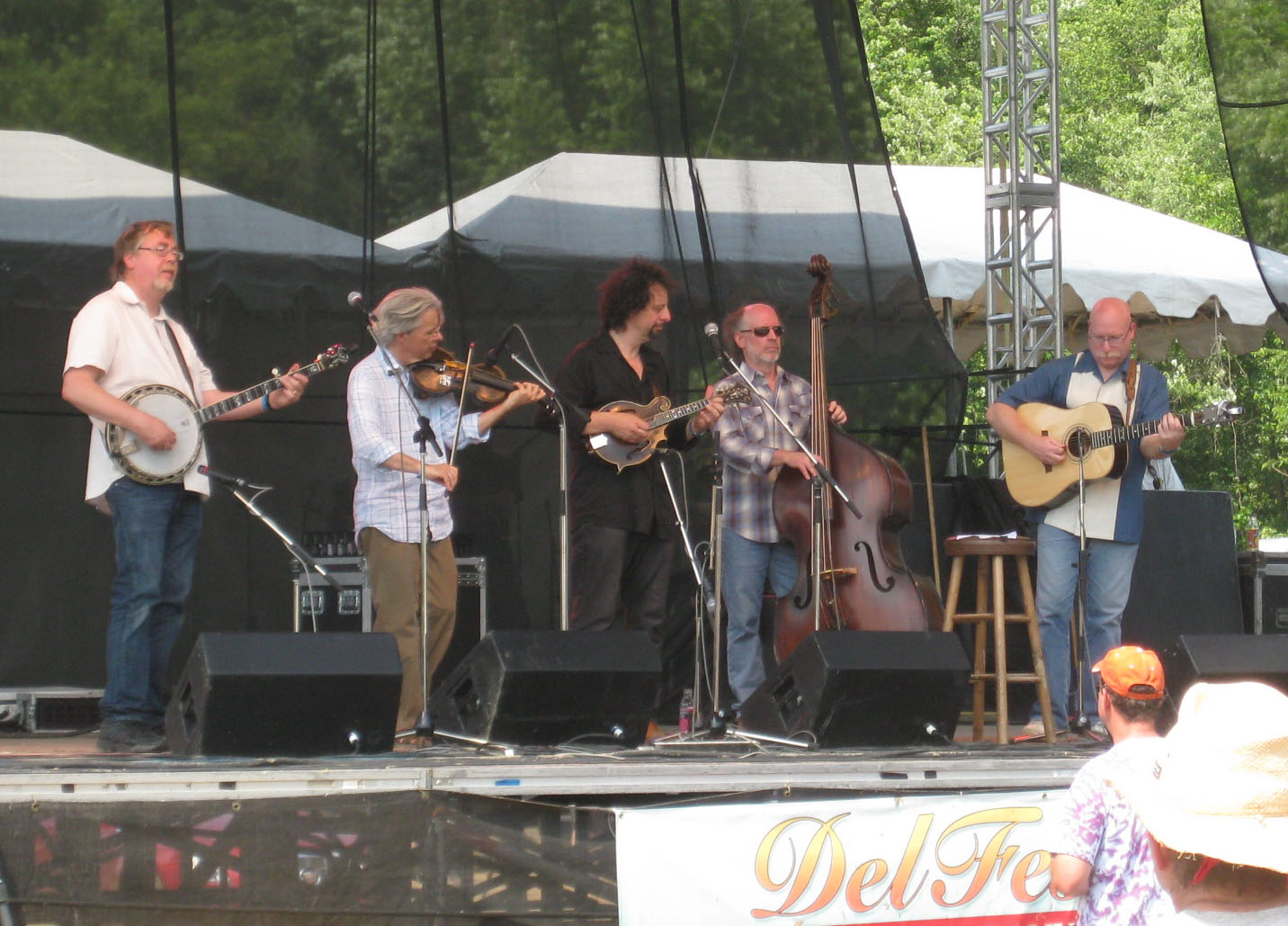
- Psychograss at DelFest, 2011

Background information
- Genres: Bluegrass; folk; jazz
- Years active: 1993–2005
- Labels: Windham Hill, Sugar Hill
- Past members: Darol Anger; Joe Craven; Mike Marshall; Todd Phillips; Tony Trischka; David Grier; Tim O'Brien

Psychograss was an American bluegrass supergroup founded by fiddler Darol Anger and mandolinist Mike Marshall.

Anger and Marshall had been members of the David Grisman Quintet, the band Montreaux, and had performed as a duo. They invited two other Grisman players, bassist Todd Phillips and percussionist Joe Craven, and recorded their first album in 1993. Tim O'Brien sang on the album and Tony Trischka played banjo. Guitarist David Grier joined the band on their second album, which included a cover version of a Jimi Hendrix song.

== Discography ==
- Psychograss (Windham Hill, 1993)
- Like Minds (Sugar Hill, 1996)
- Now Hear This (Adventure, 2005)
