= World Turning (album) =

Studio album by Tony Trischka
- Released: 1993
- Genre: Folk; Bluegrass; World music; Newgrass; Country
- Length: 48:59
- Label: Rounder Records
- Producer: Tony Trischka

Professional ratings
Review scores
Source	Rating
AllMusic	3/5 stars
Chicago Tribune	3.5/4 stars

World Turning is a studio album orchestrated by banjo player Tony Trischka. Genres vary wildly as do performers for each track. The title track of the album is a cover version of "World Turning", a song by Fleetwood Mac. The newgrass-style title track divides the album in two, the first half representing 19th century and earlier period banjo music, while the latter showcases 20th century banjo music and beyond.

== Track listing ==
No.	Title	Music	Length
1.	"Alfa Ya Ya"	Traditional	3:03
2.	"Keemo Kimo/Circus Jig"	Traditional	1:33
3.	"The Boatman's Dance/Over the Mountains"	Traditional	3:13
4.	"Dan Tucker/Get Along John/Briggs Jig"	Traditional	1:48
5.	"Ladies of Refinement"	Tony Trischka	3:35
6.	"Benko's Rag (A Magyar Fantasy)"	Tony Trischka	3:04
7.	"Booth Shot Lincoln"	Traditional	2:39
8.	"Greenwood"	Tony Trischka	2:19
9.	"World Turning"	Lindsey Buckingham; Christine McVie	4:39
10.	"Ditzy & Zesty"	Tony Trischka	3:48
11.	"West Point of the Eno"	Tony Trischka	4:22
12.	"Sun Prairie"	Tony Trischka	5:23
13.	"If Animals Could Talk"	Tony Trischka	2:50
14.	"Reuben"	Traditional	3:51
15.	"Down in the Cider House"	Tony Trischka	3:57
Total length:			48:59

== Personnel ==
- Darol Anger – Fiddle
- Barry Bales – Bass
- Jeff Berman – Percussion, Tambourine, Vibraphone
- Bill Berry – Guest Artist, Percussion
- Peter Buck – Bouzouki, Guest Artist
- Lindsey Buckingham – Composer
- William S. Burroughs – Guest Artist, Speech/Speaker/Speaking Part, Vocals, Voices
- Bob Carlin – Liner Notes
- Dudley Connell – Guest Artist, Guitar, Vocals
- Joe Craven – Percussion
- David Dennison – Engineer
- Patrick Derivaz – Engineer
- Gordon Gano – Guitar, Guitar (Acoustic), Guitar (Electric), Vocals
- Nancy Given – Design
- Matt Glaser – Fiddle
- Ed Goldstein – Tuba
- James Grauerholz – Producer
- Richard Greene – Fiddle
- Beryl Marriott – Fiddle
- David Grisman – Mandolin
- Gregory Heisler – Photography
- Ira Gluck – Photography
- Peter Herbert – Bass
- Aaron Hurwitz – Editing, Engineer, Mixing
- Kenny Kosek – Fiddle
- Alison Krauss – Fiddle, Guest Artist, Vocals
- Victor de Lorenzo – Drums
- Jim Maginnis – Drums, Trombone
- Mike Marshall – Guitar
- Roger Mason – Bass
- Bill McElroy – Engineer
- Christine McVie – Composer
- Clif Norrell – Engineer
- Van Dyke Parks – Lyricist, Piano, Vocals
- Todd Phillips – Bass
- Larold Rebhun – Engineer
- Farm Report – Producer
- Brian Ritchie – Bass (Acoustic), Didjeridu, Guitar (Bass)
- Cynthia Sayer – Drums
- Richie Stearns – Banjo, Claw Hammer Banjo, Vocals
- Adam Steffey – Mandolin
- David Stone – Engineer
- Evan Stover – Viola
- Syd Straw – Guest Artist, Vocals, Vocals (Background)
- Tony Trischka – Arranger, Banjo, Composer, Editing, Fretless Banjo, Gourd Banjo, Mixing, Primary Artist, Producer
- Violent Femmes – Guest Artist
- Buddy Wachter – Banjo
- Bob Ward – Editing, Engineer, Mixing
