= David Grier =

American guitarist (born 1961)

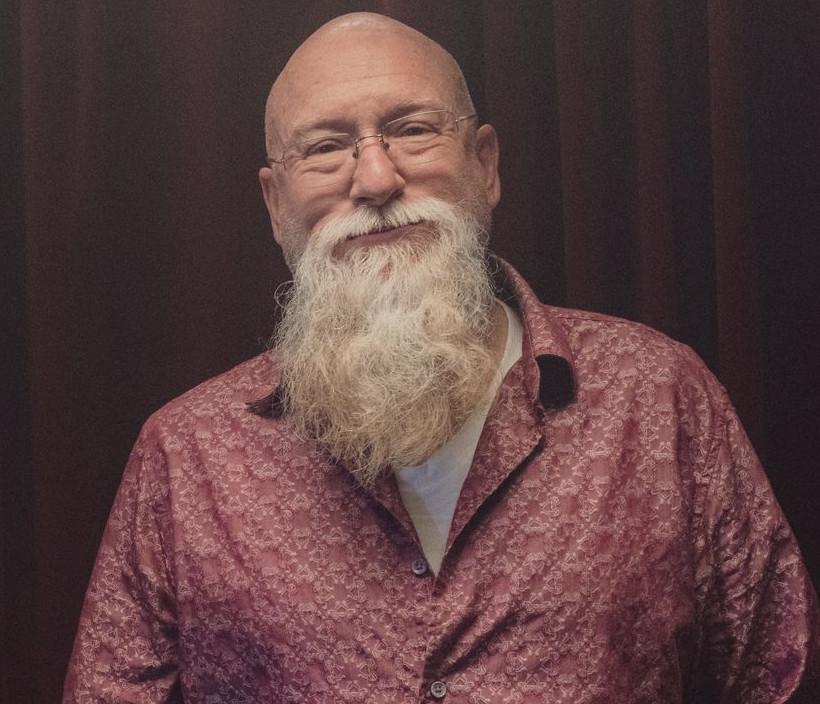
- Grier in April 2024

Background information
- Born: 1961 (age 64–65); Washington, D.C., U.S.
- Genres: Bluegrass, acoustic
- Occupation: Musician
- Instrument: Guitar
- Years active: 1981–present
- Label: Dreadnaught

David Grier is an American acoustic guitarist. A three-time IBMA guitarist of the year, Grier has been lauded as highly influential and a master flatpicker by music publications and several of his colleagues.

Grier is particularly known for crosspicking, as well as unique phrasing and repeated variations of melody and harmony parts. The Bluegrass Situation has noted Grier's "phenomenal cross-picking guitar techniques, which put him among the greatest bluegrass players of the last several decades."

He has the rare distinction of appearing as a guitarist on bluegrass albums which have been nominated for Grammy Awards in three different decades. He is also the only bluegrass musician to be named "Best Instrumentalist" in the Nashville Scene Readers Poll two years in a row (2025 and 2026).

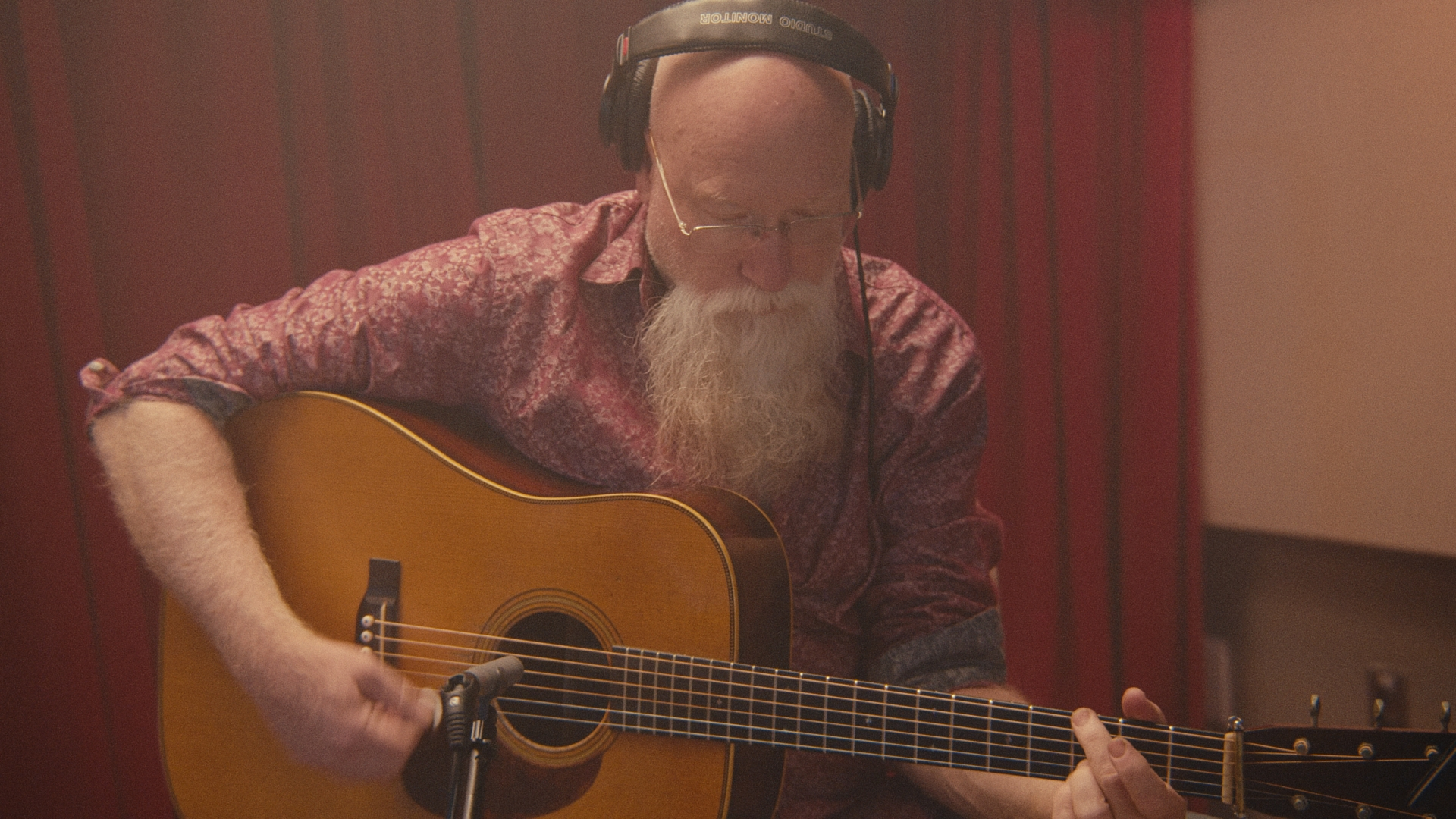
David Grier playing a session at Tunesmith Studios, April 2, 2024

== Biography ==
=== Early history ===
Grier was born in Washington D.C. in 1961. His family moved to Nashville when he was 3, and he began playing guitar at age 6. Grier's father Lamar was a banjo player in Bluegrass legend Bill Monroe's band for a number of years.

Roland White was a major musical influence on the young Grier, and helped him learn to play. Grier's guitar playing is also heavily influenced by that of Clarence White, Roland's brother.

When he was 20 years old, Grier joined the Virginia band Full Time. During the 1980s, he performed with Country Gazette and Doug Dillard, and then began to record his own albums beginning with Freewheeling in 1988.

=== Psychograss ===
Grier performs solo and as a member of the group Psychograss, founded by Darol Anger and Mike Marshall.

=== Helen Highwater ===
In 2015, bluegrass supergroup Helen Highwater, consisting of Grier, Shad Cobb (fiddle), Missy Raines (bass), and Mike Compton (mandolin), released one self-titled EP.

=== Music instruction ===
Grier worked with Matt Flinner, Darol Anger, Tony Trischka, and Todd Phillips to prepare the All Star Bluegrass Jam Along instruction books and CDs for Homespun Music Instruction.

=== Musical instruments ===
Grier owns his father's 1955 Martin D-18. The D-18 was his main guitar for a number of years but is now "retired." He also played a Nashville Guitar Company dreadnought, built by renowned luthier Marty Lanham in Nashville, TN, the guitar was sold in 2009 with the music store Elderly Instruments. His current principal guitar is a Martin D-28, which was built in 1946.

=== Awards ===
Grier was named "Guitar Player of the Year" by the International Bluegrass Music Association three times (1992, 1993 and 1995).

Grier was recognized by Acoustic Guitar magazine as one of the top ten influential artists of the 1990s.

== Influence ==
Molly Tuttle has called Grier "one of [her] guitar heroes". During her appearance on the Guitar Player Magazine show "My Life in Five Riffs", called Grier's version of "Bill Cheatham" a "masterclass in flatpicking guitar" and said of his influence, "he plays around with a melody, and also fills out the melody, so you can hear these chord changes around the melody of a fiddle tune, and I love that about his playing - that he incorporates a lot of crosspicking so you don't just hear the melody, you hear all the harmony."
