= Americana (Modern Mandolin Quartet album) =

2012 album by the Modern Mandolin Quartet

Studio album by Modern Mandolin Quartet
- Released: 2012
- Recorded: August 22–24, 2011
- Studio: Skywalker Sound
- Genres: Classical, folk
- Length: 72:13
- Label: Sono Luminus
- Producers: Marina and Victor Ledin

Modern Mandolin Quartet chronology
Nutcracker Suite (2004)	Americana (2012)

Americana is the seventh and most recent album by the American chamber music group the Modern Mandolin Quartet (MMQ), recorded by the musicians Paul Binkley, Matt Flinner, Dana Rath and Adam Roszkiewicz. The 2012 album features United States–oriented classical and folk music by the composers George Gershwin, Antonin Dvorák, Philip Glass, Leonard Bernstein, Aaron Copland and Bill Monroe. Produced for the Sono Luminus label by Marina and Victor Ledin, the album picked up three Grammy Award nominations: Best Chamber Music/Small Ensemble Performance, naming MMQ; Producer of the Year, Classical, naming the Ledins; and Best Engineered Album, Classical, for the recording, mixing, and surround sound/stereo mastering by Daniel Shores.

The album package contained two discs: one was a standard stereo CD, and the other was a Blu-ray disc containing high-resolution audio mixes including two-channel stereo and the 5.1 and 7.1 surround sound formats.

== Background ==
After releasing a second album of The Nutcracker Suite in 2004, the Modern Mandolin Quartet took a break in 2006. San Rafael–based mandolinist Dana Rath worked on other projects such as the bluegrass group Barbwyre, and he took a trip to Poland to participate in a mandolin orchestra. Nashville-based mandolinist Matt Flinner led his own trio on a "music du jour" tour, and he played on Steve Martin's banjo album The Crow in 2009. Multi-instrumentalist Paul Binkley continued to work with youth at the San Francisco Conservatory of Music, and he performed with the San Francisco Symphony. Mandocello player Adam Roszkiewicz kept collaborating with guitarist/singer/songwriter AJ Roach and affiliated musicians on the San Francisco Peninsula, and he played in the San Francisco Bluegrass and Old Time Festival.

The husband–wife freelance production team of Victor and Marina A. Ledin contacted MMQ in 2011 to propose a new album project. Also from San Rafael, the Ledins suggested that MMQ record music in high-resolution surround sound for the Sono Luminus label. MMQ decided to feature music written by Americans as well as the Czech composer Antonin Dvorák who came to the US and helped define the sound of America starting with his highly regarded Symphony No. 9 "From the New World". MMQ chose Dvorák's String Quartet No. 12 In F ("The American") because it translated so well to the mandolin. The group also chose Philip Glass's Mishima soundtrack for its "hypnotic" patterns and modern sound. Other music chosen for the new recording included works that were already in MMQ's repertoire: "Hoe-Down" by Aaron Copland, "Cool" by Leonard Bernstein, Three Piano Preludes by George Gershwin in an arrangement by John Imholz, and a medley of bluegrass tunes by Bill Monroe that had been arranged years earlier by MMQ founder Mike Marshall. Busy with other projects, Marshall wished MMQ well with the Americana recording.

== Recording ==
Americana was recorded at Skywalker Sound a few miles north of San Rafael for three days: August 22–24, 2011. Marina and Victor Ledin ran the sessions. The basic recording setup was configured for surround sound by Sono Luminus engineer Daniel Shores who placed seven Schoeps microphones in the middle of the quartet to correspond to the seven main loudspeakers in 7.1 surround sound. Four of the microphones were aimed directly at one musician each, while the other three microphones captured less direct sound and more of the studio ambiance. The recording was made at the high digital resolution of 24 bits/192 kHz. Afterward, Shores carried the multi-track recordings to Virginia where he mixed and mastered them at the Sono Luminus facility. Shores said he refrained from adding equalization or effects to the individual tracks, to convey the purest possible listening experience.

MMQ ran into difficulty recording Glass's Mishima music. Rath remembered that "the flow was not right", and they nearly rejected the composition. Instead, the players decided to return the next day and radically change their style with shorter and more staccato notes, using hammer-on and pull-off techniques. In their first run-through the next morning, the difference was so striking that Shores and the Ledins poured out of the control room to compliment the group. Rath said, "it really fell in place."

== Track listing ==
1: "Hoe-Down" from Rodeo by Aaron Copland – 3:49
String Quartet No. 12 In F, Op. 96, B. 179, ("The American") by Antonin Dvorák

2: I. Allegro ma non troppo – 9:44
3: II. Lento – 7:21
4: III. Molto vivace – 4:11
5: IV. Finale: vivace, ma non troppo – 5:52

6: "Cool" from West Side Story by Leonard Bernstein – 4:53
7: "Shenandoah" – 4:21
Three Piano Preludes by George Gershwin

8: Prelude I: Allegro ben ritmato e deciso – 1:57
9: Prelude II: Andante con moto e poco rubato – 4:25
10: Prelude III: Allegro ben ritmato e deciso – 1:31

11: Bill Monroe medley – 8:29
String Quartet No. 3 "Mishima" by Philip Glass

12: Movement 1 – 1957: Award Montage – 4:29
13: Movement 2 – November 25: Ichigaya – 1:18
14: Movement 3 – 1962: Body Building – 1:45
15: Movement 4 – 1937: Mishima / Closing – 3:23

16: Irish roots medley – 4:46

== High-resolution audio ==
The mission of the record label Sono Luminus is to release high-resolution audio albums containing folk music or early music. The Blu-ray disc of Americana delivered high-resolution mixes of the same MMQ performances as heard on the standard CD. These Blu-ray mixes consisted of 24-bit word-length digital audio tracks to supply a theoretical dynamic range of 144 decibels. The entire album was repeated three times on the Blu-ray disc, once in each of the following formats:

- Stereo sound, two tracks at 24-bit word length and 192 kHz sampling rate, LPCM format.
- 5.1 surround sound, six tracks at 24-bit word length and 192 kHz sampling rate, DTS format.
- 7.1 surround sound, eight tracks at 24-bit word length and 96 kHz sampling rate, DTS format.

== Personnel ==
- Dana Rath – mandolin
- Paul Binkley – mandola
- Matt Flinner – mandolin
- Adam Roszkiewicz – mandocello

=== Production ===
- Marina A. Ledin – producer
- Victor Ledin – producer
- Daniel Shores – engineering, mixing, mastering for Sono Luminus
- Dann M. Thompson – assistant engineer at Skywalker Sound

== See also ==
- 55th Annual Grammy Awards
