= Absence (Terence Blanchard album) =

Studio album by Terence Blanchard
- Released: August 27, 2021
- Genre: Jazz
- Length: 64:51
- Label: Blue Note
- Producers: Robin Burgess, Terence Blanchard

Terence Blanchard chronology
Live (2018)	Absence (2021)

Professional ratings
Aggregate scores
Source	Rating
Metacritic	87/100
Review scores
Source	Rating
All About Jazz	3/5 stars
AllMusic	4.5/5 stars
DownBeat	2.5/5 stars
Jazzwise	4/5 stars
Mojo	4/5 stars
PopMatters	8/10

Absence is a studio album by American jazz trumpeter Terence Blanchard featuring the E-Collective and the Turtle Island Quartet. The album was released on August 27, 2021, by Blue Note. In this album, Blanchard celebrates his mentor Wayne Shorter.

== Reception ==
At Metacritic, which assigns a normalized rating out of 100 to reviews from mainstream critics, the album received an average score of 87, based on four reviews, which indicates "universal acclaim".

Steve Futterman of The New Yorker wrote, "With “Absence,” the trumpeter Terence Blanchard pays tribute to the influential octogenarian composer in a project that reconsiders a handful of Shorter's works..., along with originals dedicated to the iconic patriarch. Employing his plugged-in E-Collective unit, with ample contributions from the Turtle Island Quartet, and tellingly shedding any additional wind instruments, Blanchard avoids deliberate stylistic intimations of Shorter's own classic work, or of his collaborations with both Miles Davis and Weather Report, in favor of a lush and dramatic soundscape that calls to mind Blanchard's career as a successful film composer." John Garratt of PopMatters commented, "Absence sounds too perfect to be the product of nine musicians struggling for their art. As far as complaints go, that's a meager one. There is a great deal going on inside these 64 minutes of music, and that alone should be enough to provoke many revisits. The composition quality and all-around musicianship are foregone conclusions with Blanchard, who somehow manages not to spread himself thin when premiering an opera in New York while scoring multiple works for Spike Lee. To imagine Absence as another brick in that wall is rather staggering." Mike Hobart in his review for Jazzwise added, "An impressive, densely-textured album, with headlong improvisations spiced by dramatic juxtapositions of electric band and strings."

== Track listing ==
No.	Title	Writer(s)	Length
1.	"Absence"	David Ginyard	6:55
2.	"The Elders"	Wayne Shorter	6:04
3.	"Fall"	Wayne Shorter	5:38
4.	"I Dare You (Intro)"	Terence Blanchard	1:36
5.	"I Dare You"	Terence Blanchard	7:46
6.	"Envisioned Reflections (Intro)"	David Ginyard	1:32
7.	"Envisioned Reflections"	David Ginyard	2:35
8.	"The Second Wave"	David Balakrishnan	10:43
9.	"When It Was Now"	Wayne Shorter	5:22
10.	"Dark Horse"	Charles Altura	7:17
11.	"Diana"	Wayne Shorter	7:06
12.	"More Elders"	Wayne Shorter	2:20
Total length:			64:51

== Personnel ==
- Terence Blanchard – trumpet

The E-Collective

- Charles Altura – guitar
- Fabian Almazan – piano
- David Ginyard – bass
- Oscar Seaton – drums

The Turtle Island Quartet

- David Balakrishnan – violin
- Benjamin von Gutzeit – viola
- Gabe Terraciano – violin
- Malcolm Parson – cello

Cover Art

- Andrew F. Scott
- Sarah N. Wall
