= The Crow: New Songs for the 5-String Banjo =

The Crow: New Songs for the Five String Banjo

Studio album by Steve Martin
- Released: January 27, 2009
- Genre: Bluegrass, folk revival
- Length: 43:18
- Label: Rounder
- Producer: John McEuen

Steve Martin chronology
The Steve Martin Brothers (1981)	The Crow: New Songs for the Five String Banjo (2009)	Rare Bird Alert (2011)

Professional ratings
Review scores
Source	Rating
Allmusic	4/5 stars

The Crow: New Songs for the 5-String Banjo is a 2009 album by Steve Martin, featuring Dolly Parton, Vince Gill, Earl Scruggs, Tim O'Brien, Tony Trischka and Mary Black. It contains 15 songs and is the first album focusing on Martin as a musician. Martin's 1977 comedy recording Let's Get Small, however, did feature him briefly playing the banjo during some of the comedy bits, and The Steve Martin Brothers devotes one side to banjo playing, including earlier renditions of some of the music presented here. It was first released on January 27, 2009, as an Amazon.com exclusive and then released to retail stores everywhere on May 19, 2009. On January 31, 2010, the album won the Grammy Award for Best Bluegrass Album at the 52nd Grammy Awards.

== Track list ==
All songs written by Steve Martin except where indicated.

1. "Daddy Played the Banjo" (Steve Martin, Gary Scruggs)
  - Tim O'Brien on vocals and Earl Scruggs on banjo
2. "Pitkin County Turnaround" [instrumental]
3. "Hoedown at Alice's" [instrumental]
4. "Late for School"
  - Steve Martin on vocals
5. "Tin Roof" [instrumental]
6. "Words Unspoken" [instrumental] (Steve Martin, Pete Wernick)
  - Pete Wernick on banjo
7. Pretty Flowers
  - Vince Gill and Dolly Parton on vocals; Earl Scruggs and Pete Wernick on banjo
8. "Wally on the Run" [instrumental]
  - Tony Trischka on banjo
9. "Freddie's Lilt" [instrumental]
10. "Saga of the Old West" [instrumental]
11. "Clawhammer Medley" [instrumental] (traditional; arranged and additional music by Steve Martin)
  - composed of "Sally Ann", "Johnson Boys", "Simple Gifts" and "The Bonnie Banks o' Loch Lomond"
12. "Calico Train"
  - Mary Black on vocals
13. "Banana Banjo" [instrumental]
14. "Blue River Waltz" [instrumental]
15. "The Crow" [instrumental]
  - Tony Trischka on banjo
16. "Calico Train" (remix) [instrumental]
  - not included on all editions

A deluxe limited edition was released June 16, 2009. It is packaged in a die-cut, fold-open, pop-up Digipak and contains tracks 1 to 15 as listed above with the additions of:

16. "Late for School" [instrumental]
17. "The Slow Crow" [instrumental]
18. "Calico Train" [instrumental]

== Personnel ==
- Steve Martin - vocals (track 4), banjo ("all the frailing, and most of the Scruggs style banjo") and piano
- David Amram - percussion, wind instruments (tracks 9, 10, 12, and 18)
- Russ Barenberg - guitar (tracks 3 to 6, 9 to 11, 14, and 16)
- Mary Black - vocals (track 12)
- Chris Caswell - accordion, orchestra, piano (tracks 2, 5, and 13)
- Michael Daves - guitar (tracks 2, 7, 8, 12, 13, 15, and 18)
- Jerry Douglas - resonator guitar (tracks 1, 4, 7, 10, and 16)
- Stuart Duncan - fiddle, mandolin (tracks 1, 5, 7, 8, 10, 12, 14, and 18)
- Craig Eastman - fiddle, octave violin (tracks 1 to 6, 8 to 10, 12 to 14, 16, and 18)
- Matt Flinner - mandolin (tracks 2 to 13, 15, 16, and 18)
- Vince Gill - vocals (track 7)
- Brittany Haas - fiddle (tracks 2 to 6, 8 to 13, 16 to 18)
- Kenny Malone - percussion (tracks 1, 2, 4, 5, 7, 9, 10, 12, 16, and 18)
- Bruce Martin - bodhrán, tabla, percussion (tracks 1, 4, 7, 8, 10, 12, 16, and 18)
- John McEuen - guitar, banjo, bowed guitar, electric bass, effects, mandolin (tracks 1, 2, 4, 5, 7, 10, 12, 16, and 18)
- Tim O'Brien - vocals (track 1)
- Liam O'Flynn - Uilleann pipes, drone, tin whistle (tracks 3, 9, 10, 12, and 18)
- Hans Olson - harmonica (tracks 1, 4, 7, 10, 12, 16, and 18)
- Dolly Parton - vocals (track 7)
- Earl Scruggs - banjo (tracks 1 and 7)
- Tony Trischka - banjo (tracks 8 and 15)
- Jourdan Urbach - violin (track 13)
- Skip Ward - acoustic bass
- Pete Wernick - 2nd chair banjo (tracks 6 and 7)

== Chart performance ==
Chart (2009)	Peak position
U.S. Billboard 200	93
U.S. Billboard Top Bluegrass Albums	1
