= Call You Cowboy =

Studio album by Brenn Hill
- Released: Jul 31, 2001
- Recorded: 2001
- Genre: Country, cowboy
- Length: 44:53
- Label: Real West Productions
- Producer: Bruce Innes, Duke Davis

Brenn Hill chronology
Trail Through Yesterday (2000)	Call You Cowboy (2001)	Endangered (2004)

Call You Cowboy is an American Western album released by Brenn Hill in 2001. The album was nominated as Traditional Western Album of the Year by the Western Music Association.

== "Call You Cowboy" ==
The title track was chosen by the Members of the Western Writers of America as one of the Top 100 Western songs of all time. In the song, the singer talks to another person whose "father calls you a drifter, but I call you cowboy", then describes what are, to him, the attributes of a "cowboy" — intricacy, complexity, innovation, survivability, and unwillingness to conform.

== Track listing ==
All tracks are written by Brenn Hill, except as noted.

No.	Title	Writer(s)	Length
1.	"Call You Cowboy"		4:02
2.	"Roundup Fire"		2:49
3.	"Lady Idaho"		2:58
4.	"Night Horse"	Chuck Pyle	4:04
5.	"Rewin the West"		3:27
6.	"Cottonwood"		2:06
7.	"Greys River Road"		2:38
8.	"Wyoming Wind"		3:39
9.	"Nights Like This"		3:33
10.	"Fall Comin On"		3:38
11.	"Bitter Creek"		3:47
12.	"Powder River Queen"		2:49
13.	"Hill Family Song"		5:23
Total length:			44:53

== Personnel ==
- Scotty Burns - violin
- Gary Carlson - electric bass
- Duke Davis - bass guitar
- Matt Flinner - mandolin
- Bruce Innes - acoustic guitar
- Rich O'Brien - guitars
- Andy Poling - percussion
- Jeffery Rew - upright bass
- Kenny Sears - dobro
- Wayne 'Bullhide' Shrubsall - banjo
- Ryan Shupe - mandolin
- Russell Terrell - background vocals
- Paul Todd - harmonica
- Byron Walcher - pedal steel guitar
- Brenn Hill - vocals, background vocals
