= Elderly Instruments =

American musical instrument retailer

- Type: Private
- Founded: 1972, East Lansing, Michigan, United States
- Founders: Stan Werbin; Sharon McInturff
- Services: Musical instrument repair
- Revenue: $17 million (2007)
- Owner: Stan Werbin
- Number of employees: 85 (2008)
- Website: Elderly.com

Elderly Instruments is a musical instrument retailer in Lansing, Michigan, United States, with a reputation as a "megastore", a repair shop and a locus for folk music including bluegrass and "twang". Specializing in fretted instruments, including acoustic and electric guitars, banjos, mandolins, and ukuleles, Elderly maintains a selection of odd or rare instruments. Elderly is known as a premier repair shop for fretted instruments, as one of the larger vintage instrument dealers in the United States, and as a major dealer of Martin guitars in particular.

Industry publications, music retail trade, and bluegrass music journals have featured articles about the Elderly repair staff. The company also provides consignment services for rare and vintage instruments. Since its founding in 1972, Elderly has undergone two major expansions: into mail order in 1975 and then into Internet sales in the 1990s. In 2005 it was the subject of a lawsuit by Gibson Guitar Corporation concerning trademark infringement. Today it is recognized internationally for its services and products; its mail order and Internet business account for 65–70 percent of its total revenue. Elderly grossed $12 million in 1999, and by 2007 was grossing $17 million annually.

In addition to retail and repair services, Elderly Instruments is noted as a center of local music culture for bluegrass and "twang" music. Elderly Instruments operates a wholesale record distribution business, Sidestreet Distributing, in the lower level of its complex, serving more than 300 small retail businesses.

== History ==
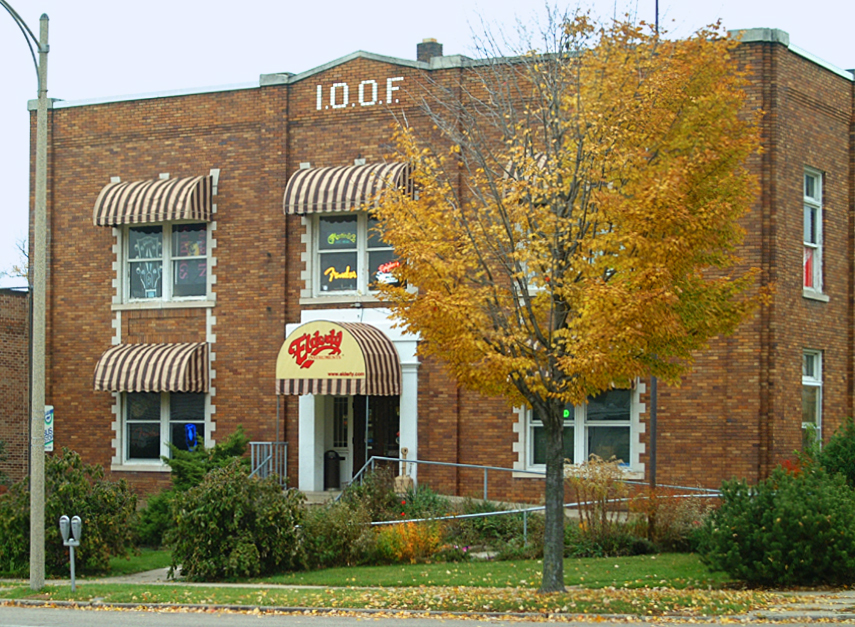
The exterior of Elderly Instruments

In 1969, New York City native Stan Werbin moved to Ann Arbor, Michigan to attend graduate school. He took his banjo and guitar with him and immediately developed his interest in folk music. Werbin participated in a lively local music scene that included collaborations and "open mic nights" at local venues. It was through those experiences that Werbin developed his appreciation for the variety of instruments the musicians were playing, as well as the various types of music that fall under the folk music genre.

When Werbin finished graduate school, he looked for business opportunities and decided to use his knowledge of used guitars. He searched for vintage instruments to buy at low prices, particularly those made before World War II; Werbin then sold the instruments after repairing and restoring them. Although he initially tried to open his business in Ann Arbor, Werbin eventually decided to avoid operating there due to the high number of other musical instrument dealers. In 1972, Werbin and Sharon McInturff, his college friend and business partner, leased retail space in East Lansing, Michigan for $60 a month in a building that also housed the Michigan Youth Politics Institute, a non-profit organization dedicated to encouraging young adults to vote. With $500 of capital, the two began advertising locally. Werbin and McInturff took the "Elderly" name from a 1971 classified ad they saw, in which the seller marketed his Gibson Les Paul as a "nice, elderly instrument".

Elderly Instruments expanded during the following years. Shortly after the 1972 United States Presidential election, the Michigan Youth Politics Institute moved out of the space across the hall, and Elderly took over the entire basement of the building. In 1975, it expanded into the mail order business. By 1982, Elderly Instruments had about 25 employees but little available space, and so in the following year the owners bought an Independent Order of Odd Fellows building in Lansing, Michigan. After it was renovated for retail use, the company moved into it in January 1984, and in 1986 Werbin bought out McInturff to become the sole owner. In 1994, Elderly expanded again by buying adjacent building space that had once been a post office and a National Cash Register Company building. Around the same time, it began taking merchandise orders over its new web site. The company does not, however, sell merchandise through online auction sites such as eBay, unlike many other independent musical instrument retailers. Werbin notes that entering the Internet business was not much of a challenge for Elderly, as the staff was already experienced at taking and shipping orders for customers throughout the world. He also notes that, with its mail order and Internet business accounting for 65–70 percent of its total revenue, Elderly would have experienced limited growth in Lansing had it not expanded into those markets. The company operates in around 35,000 ft^{2} (3,300 m^{2}) of space, and is one of the largest vintage instruments dealers in the United States.

Elderly Instruments has become known due to its attention to folk music niche markets (Eddie Collins of Bluegrass Now remarked "The roots of what today has become perhaps the world's most well known music store for acoustic instruments can be traced directly to the folk music boom of the 1960s."), its reputation as a repair shop, its selection of vintage instruments, and its position as a major Martin guitar dealer.

In May 2010, an Elderly manager told the publication TWICE that economic recession had affected the business and forced layoffs of part-time employees, and that Elderly's being in Michigan worsened the effects. He noted that as the consumer electronics business began to recover, the musical instrument business followed.

== Gibson Guitar Corporation lawsuit ==
In June 2005, Gibson Guitar Corporation filed a cease and desist order and an accompanying lawsuit against Elderly Instruments. The complaint alleged that Elderly was selling a banjo on its web site marketed as a "Gibson copy" and that the phrase constituted a trademark infringement. Despite Elderly's claim of having addressed the issue by changing the phrase first to "Famous Maker Copy" and then to "Classic Bluegrass Banjo Copy", Gibson persisted with the complaint and asked for unspecified damages. Gibson later issued a press release stating that the lawsuit had been settled.

In the same year, Gibson severed its contract with Elderly as a retailer of Gibson products, citing a contract stipulation that retailers should not carry any competing brands of banjos and mandolins. Elderly had been one of nine retailers selling the specialized Gibson Bluegrass line of banjos and mandolins, although it also carried other brands. Werbin attempted to rectify the situation by offering a dedicated area of the store for Gibson products, but Gibson proceeded with the action. As a result, Elderly does not offer new Gibson products for sale. The incident was well-publicized in the media and discussed at length in consumer forums.

== Instrument sales ==
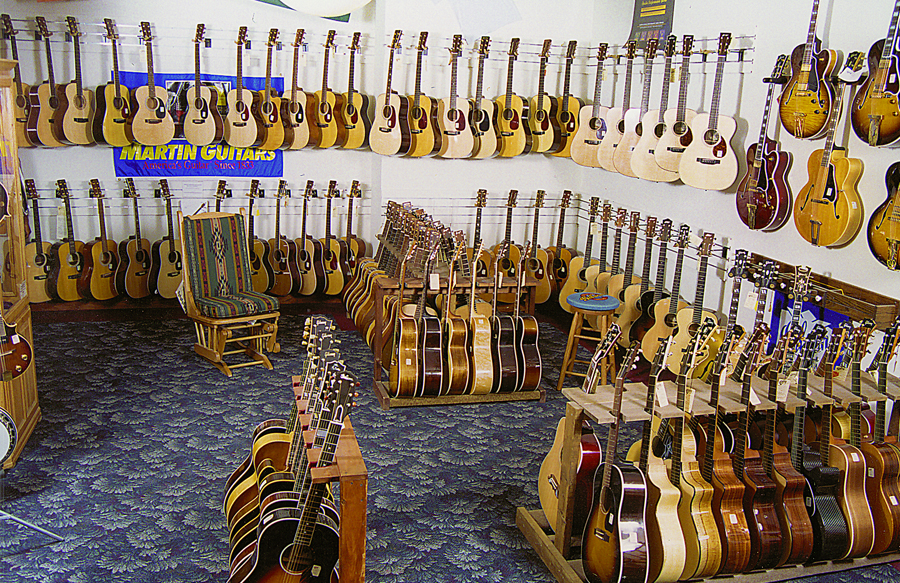
A section of the Elderly showroom offering acoustic and archtop electric guitars

In 2007, Elderly sold more than 16,000 instruments. The company is a dealer of Martin guitars, as well as other mainstream brands such as Guild and Fender. It sells used Gibson instruments, but not new models as a result of the Gibson lawsuit. Although the bulk of its business comes from guitar sales, the company carries a range of other instruments, such as banjos, ukuleles, mandolins, accordions, concertinas, bouzoukis, sitars, musical saws, and African thumb pianos. Some of the rarer instruments are purchased as collectibles. Elderly is an exclusive retailer of "LunchBox-A-LeLes", ukuleles made from various tin lunch box designs. The journal Bluegrass Unlimited has noted Elderly Instruments for carrying "elite" brands of instruments, such as Paul Duff mandolins, Huss & Dalton acoustic guitars, Stelling banjos, and Nash electric guitars. Elderly was once one of only two American retailers for Apitius Mandolins, now only sold directly. As part of its consignment business, Elderly sells "collections" of instruments that sometimes have rich histories. In September 2006, it placed the Dopyera family's personal collection of resonator instruments up for sale, including some of the Dobro and National brands. The Dopyera family was responsible for founding those companies and innovating the resonator instrument trade.

Elderly Instruments carries a number of Martin guitars, including valuable vintage models. In interviews, Werbin frequently mentions Martins made before World War II as especially desirable and "memorable" pieces of the Elderly Instruments inventory. The guitars are sought after by musicians from the bluegrass and other genres. Werbin purchases some of the more valuable or interesting instruments for his personal collection, and has lent them to museums as temporary exhibits.

Periodicals for the bluegrass genre such as Bluegrass Canada and Bluegrass Now have featured stories about Elderly and its selection of bluegrass instruments and repair services. Elderly employees maintain connections with the bluegrass industry by attending trade shows such as the International Bluegrass Association Trade Show in Louisville, Kentucky. At these shows, Elderly showcases typical bluegrass instruments, such as banjos, guitars, mandolins, fiddles and resophonic guitars, to musicians and businesspeople. Elderly Instruments staff members have set up organizations such as the "Friends of Bluegrass" to support local bluegrass musicians.

Michigan Living magazine noted Elderly's liberal policy regarding the handling of instruments, something Werbin attributes to his difficulty shopping for Martin guitars in New York City in the 1960s. The magazine also notes that customers are encouraged to pick up and play any instrument, an unusual policy for a high-end instrument retailer. Impromptu "jam sessions" are frequent in the store, as customers try out guitars.

== Repair and appraisals ==
The repair shop occupies about 3,000 ft^{2} (280 m^{2}) of space in the Elderly building. A number of notable guitarists have sent their instruments to Elderly for complete restoration or other major work such as refinishing and refretting. Elderly's repair department services other fretted instruments such as banjos, ukuleles, and balalaikas.

In February 1996, a feature article in Guitar Shop Magazine documented the company's restoration of a severely damaged Martin J40-M acoustic guitar. The Martin had been in the trunk of an automobile when a semi-trailer truck struck the automobile. Almost every part of the guitar was damaged: the top, back, sides, fingerboard, and neck block. The worst damage, and the most challenging to repair, was caused by the neck block having punched through the back of the guitar. The owner brought the Martin to Elderly after other repair shops had rejected it as being beyond repair. The technicians at Elderly successfully restored the Martin after a labor-intensive process that included a new Adirondack spruce top.

Elderly provides an appraisal service for vintage instruments. It employs five full-time appraisers who use a detailed scale to rate the quality of instruments. Their appraisal services have been noted in media, such as The Music and Sound Retailer, as being among the best in the industry. Customers may either bring instruments directly into the store or send them by mail. Elderly owner Werbin attributes some of the company's success and reputation to the quality of the appraisals.

== Marketing and business model ==
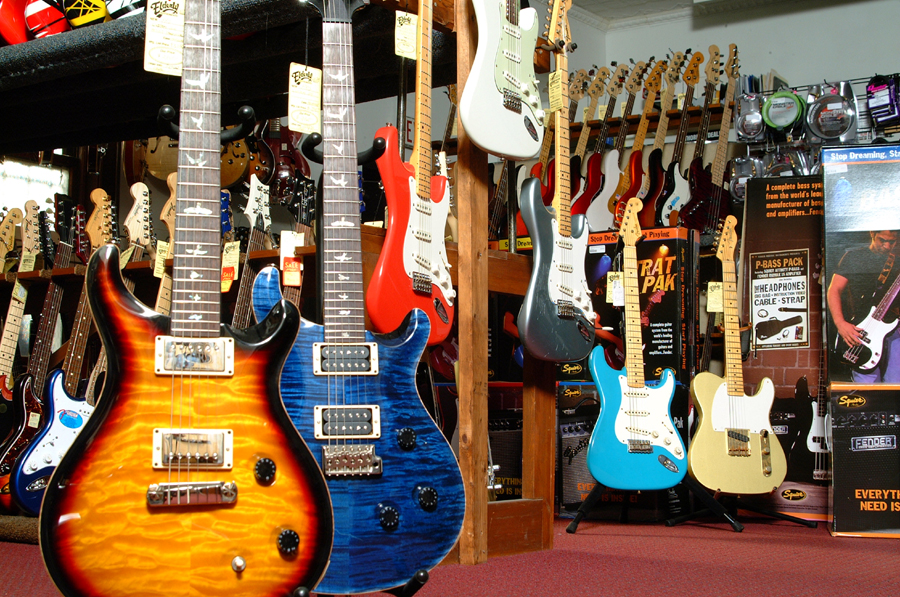
Electric guitar showroom

In addition to a printed catalog, Elderly sends lists of available vintage instruments to subscribers in the U.S. and several other countries by mail and e-mail. Elderly purchases some of its used instruments from customers and then offers them for sale, while others are offered on consignment. Although larger retailers dominate the Internet market share (Elderly grossed $12 million in 1999, larger retail outlets such as Guitar Center grossed $297 million), Elderly attempts to serve vertical markets by offering specialized or rare items on its web site, such as left-handed guitars and instrument-specific books.

Werbin notes that while discounting products by 40 percent set his business apart from the local competition in the 1970s, outlets such as Guitar Center now also offer discounts. In response to questions about his strategy for competing with larger retailers such as Guitar Center and American Musical Supply, which also operate mail order and Internet businesses, Werbin states that he has learned to operate on small margins to stay competitive: "The mom-and-pop businesses that have survived have learned to operate on narrow margins."

== Other enterprises ==
After opening its first retail space, Elderly began selling records supplied by Rounder Records, a small distributor that later grew into an independent record label specializing in roots music. After trying other distributors, Werbin started his own distribution company in 1979, named Old Fogey Distributing. By 1987, Old Fogey was servicing about 300 small retail operations, operating from the basement of Elderly's Lansing showroom. In 1997, the operation was renamed Sidestreet Distributing.

Elderly dedicates a section of its retail space to record sales. A full-time purchasing manager maintains a comprehensive selection of both mainstream and rare music, much of it in the folk and bluegrass genres; this is due to the belief that customers will become more interested in the music after making an audio purchase and then in turn buy a musical instrument. Elderly also sells instructional books and other material, much of which focuses on folk music and bluegrass genres.

The store also offers a music school focused on folk music and related instruments.

== Twang and other folk music ==
Noise, a periodical published by the local newspaper Lansing State Journal, has written that Elderly Instruments is the focus of an emerging form of American folk music, named "twang", sometimes referred to as "alternative country". Several twang bands perform and record in Lansing, many including at least one Elderly employee. Current and former Elderly employees attribute the twang influence at the store to the proliferation of associated instruments, educational materials, and musicians. East Lansing radio station WDBM has been hosting a twang music show since 1995.

Lawrence B. Johnson, music critic for The Detroit News, called Elderly a "folk music mecca" and a megastore that is a haven for folk musicians. In the past it has been one of the chief sponsors of the annual National Folk Festival.

== Recognition ==
- 2008 - Best Guitar Store - Player's Choice Awards, Acoustic Guitar magazine

=== Top Small Business of the Year ===
Elderly was named America's Top Small Business 2023 by the US Chamber of Commerce from a field of over 15,000 applicants. "Elderly Instruments . . . played a vital role in the revitalization of Old Town Lansing when they expanded their brick-and-mortar footprint, breathing new life into the district. They sponsor and participate in numerous community music festivals, camps, and concerts that add to the vibrancy of Old Town Lansing and increase tourism to the state’s capital."
