= Modern Mandolin Quartet =

American chamber music quartet

The Modern Mandolin Quartet (MMQ) is an American chamber music quartet composed of mandolin players. The group was founded in the San Francisco Bay Area in 1985 by Mike Marshall. MMQ was nominated for a Grammy Award in 2013 for Best Chamber Music/Small Ensemble Performance, based on their album Americana.

MMQ adapts classical music pieces for the mandolin, drawing especially from the string quartet literature. The group also plays more modern pieces, arranging them for the mandolin, and they have presented original works.

== History ==
The American mandolin player Mike Marshall founded the group in 1985 with mandolinist Dana Rath, to promote "serious" music for the mandolin. Guitar/banjo/mandolin player John Imholz and guitar/mandolin player Paul Binkley rounded out the foursome. Their first album was Modern Mandolin Quartet in 1988 for Windham Hill Records. Two years later, they produced Intermezzo, again for Windham Hill. This album included 20th-century compositions such as "Cool" by Leonard Bernstein from West Side Story, and "Hoedown" from Aaron Copland's Rodeo ballet.

In 1991, the group recorded the Imholz/Binkley arrangement of The Nutcracker ballet by Tchaikovsky. The album release included pieces from Vivaldi's "The Four Seasons" and Mozart's "The Magic Flute". Guest musicians included Ransom Wilson on flute, and Edgar Meyer on upright bass leading his own composition titled "Winter's Chill". MMQ revisited the Nutcracker concept in 2004, releasing the album Nutcracker Suite on the Dorian label. This new recording included compositions by Gabriel Fauré, Léo Delibes and Miguel Llobet in addition to Vivaldi and, of course, Tchaikovsky.

Marshall produced the 1993 album Pan American Journeys, with the original MMQ lineup augmented by the guest percussionist Tom Miller. Marshall and Miller had previously played together in the jazz/bluegrass ensemble Montreux. The album contained arrangements of 20th century music from North and South America, with works by the composers Astor Piazzolla, Heitor Villa-Lobos, Leo Brouwer, George Gershwin and more. Miller's own piece, "Redonda", opened the album.

Marshall left the group to concentrate on other projects. Under Binkley's leadership in 1999, MMQ recorded Interplay for D'Note Classics. The album introduced new works by the violinist David Balakrishnan and the guitarist Tully Cathey. These works were commissioned for MMQ and funded by a grant from the National Endowment for the Arts and the Lila Wallace–Reader's Digest Fund. (Lila Acheson Wallace was a publisher and philanthropist.) As well, the composer Terry Riley requested that MMQ adapt his string quartet "G-song" for mandolin; the composition had been played by the Kronos Quartet in the 1980s. As a featured guest, Balakrishnan performed his four-part suite "Interplay" alongside MMQ. David Peters was in the group for this album to cover high mandolin parts with Rath.

In 2011, MMQ recorded at Skywalker Sound with three veteran band members and one new recruit: Adam Roskiewicz. The studio sessions captured the group in high-definition surround sound for the first time. MMQ released their Americana album in 2012 in a two-disc package, with disc 1 a regular CD carrying the stereo mixes, and disc 2 a Blu-ray holding the multi-channel mixes. The album contained pieces by Gershwin, Antonin Dvorák, Philip Glass and others, as well as new recordings of Bernstein's "Cool" and Copland's "Hoedown". The album picked up a Grammy Award nomination for Best Chamber Music performance, honoring the performance by MMQ. It also collected Grammy nominations for the producers Marina and Victor Ledin in the category Producer of the Year, Classical, and for the engineering by Daniel Shores in the category Best Engineered Album, Classical.

== Members ==
The original group members were Mike Marshall, Dana Rath, John Imholz and Paul Binkley. Marshall and Rath played standard mandolins akin to violins in the classic string quartet, Binkley played the mandola which compares to the viola, and Imholz played the larger mandocello, assuming the role of cello in the quartet. Marshall left the group in the mid-1990s. Other musicians who served as members of the group include Chris Thile who later co-founded the bluegrass band Nickel Creek, and Radim Zenkl. The 1999 album Interplay was recorded by Binkley, Imholz, Rath and David Peters (mandolin).

By 2004, the lineup had changed to Binkley, Rath, Gyan Riley (mandocello) and Matt Flinner (mandolin), for the second Nutcracker release.

Regrouping after a hiatus, MMQ recorded again in 2011 for the 2012 album Americana. The Grammy-nominated lineup was Binkley, Rath, Flinner and Adam Roskiewicz (mandocello). Binkley died of lung cancer in November 2014. Radim Zenkl rejoined the group for its headline appearance at the Classical Mandolin Society of America convention in Valley Forge, Pennsylvania, in early November 2016.

== Discography ==
- Modern Mandolin Quartet (Windham Hill, 1988)
- Intermezzo (Windham Hill, 1990)
- The Nutcracker Suite (Windham Hill, 1991)
- Pan American Journeys (Windham Hill, 1993)
- Interplay (D'Note Classics, 1999)
- Nutcracker Suite (Dorian Sono Luminus, 2004)
- Americana (Sono Luminus, 2012)
