= Stelling =

Stelling is a surname. Notable people with the surname include:

- Beth Stelling (born 1986), American stand-up comedian and writer
- Billy Stelling (born 1969), Dutch cricket player
- Christopher Paul Stelling (born 1982), American singer-songwriter
- Irene Stelling (born 1971), Danish women's footballer
- Jack Stelling (1924–1993), English footballer
- Jeff Stelling (born 1955), English journalist and television presenter
- Johannes Stelling (1877–1933), German activist and politician
- Jos Stelling (born 1945), Dutch film director
- Max Stelling (born 1994), English rugby union player

== See also ==
- Stelling House, a building in Copenhagen, Denmark
- Stelling Minnis, a village in Kent, England
- Stelling van Amsterdam, the Defence Line of Amsterdam, a World Heritage Site in the Netherlands
- Steling, a mountain on the German-Belgian border
