= Brenn Hill =

American musician (born 1976)

- Born: May 26, 1976 (age 50)
- Origin: Ogden, Utah
- Genres: Country, cowboy, folk, popular
- Occupation: Singer / Songwriter / Musician
- Instruments: Singer, acoustic guitar
- Years active: 1986–present
- Labels: Red Cliffs Press, Real West Productions
- Website: www.brennhill.com

Brenn Hill (born May 26, 1976, in Ogden, Utah) is an American Western music singer-songwriter specializing in country and cowboy music. He won the Western Music Association Crescendo Award in 2001 and was named the 2004 Academy of Western Artists Male Vocalist of the Year.

== Early career ==
Brenn Hill self-released two albums, Rangefire in 1997 and Deeper Than Mud in 1999. In 2000 his third album, Trail Through Yesterday, was released by the Real West Productions record label. The album was produced by cowboy and Western musician Ian Tyson. 2001 saw the release of Hill's Call You Cowboy, an "authentic country" that was praised by Allmusic as "clearly can't be mistaken for another cookie-cutter, neo-traditional Nashville pretty boy." The album won the Western Music Association's Crescendo Award, awarded to the year's biggest rising star in the genre.

== Red Cliffs Press ==
=== Endangered (2004) ===
In 2004 Hill released Endangered on his record label, Red Cliffs Press. The album featured the top 20 Texas music chart hits "Buckaroo Tattoo" and "Pickup Truck Cafe", and was praised in American Cowboy magazine as "A collection of 14 songs with a fuller sound, more intricate arrangements, higher production values, and just a more individualistic stamp on it than Hill's previous work." Produced by Eddie Schwartz and recorded at Ocean Way studios in Nashville, Endangered won the Academy of Western Artists Male Vocalist of the Year Award, and was nominated for Album of the Year and Song of the Year for "Buckaroo Tattoo".

=== What A Man's Got To Do (2007) ===
In 2007 Hill returned to Nashville to record his sixth album, the first he produced himself, What A Man's Got To Do, at Beaird Music Group studios. American Cowboy magazine commented that "this latest effort looks to be his best... What you have to like about Brenn Hill is his honesty and his devotion to the West. He is skilled as a lyricist as well as a composer." Western Horseman magazine said that "Hill isn't content pigeon-holing his music as cowboy or country. It's simply his music – a blend of classic and contemporary."

== Discography ==
=== Albums ===
- Horses of War (2024)
- Painkiller (2022)
- Still in the Fight (2021)
- Songs for a Winter's Ride (2019)
- Rerides (2018)
- Rocky Mountain Drifter (2018)
- Campfire Collection (2017)
- How You Heal (2016)
- Spirit Rider (2015)
- Ode to Selway (2013)
- North Pole Rodeo (2011)
- Rodeo Heaven (2011)
- Equine (2010)
- What A Man's Got To Do (2007)
- Endangered (2004)
- Call You Cowboy (2001)
- Trail Through Yesterday (2000)
- Deeper Than Mud (1999)
- Rangefire (1997)
