= Montreux (band) =

American fusion band

- Origin: San Francisco, California, U.S.
- Genres: Chamber jazz, new age, bluegrass
- Years active: 1982–1990
- Label: Windham Hill
- Members: Mike Marshall; Darol Anger; Barbara Higbie; Michael Manring; Todd Phillips; Andy Narell; Tom Miller; Will Kennedy

Montreux was an American fusion band, specializing in the blend of jazz and bluegrass, with jam elements. The band was active from approximately 1982 until 1990, and recorded on Windham Hill Records. The name of the band came from the jazz festival in Switzerland of the same name, at which an early version of the band was formed under a different name.

== Band members ==
The group consisted of four core members:

- Darol Anger - Violins
- Barbara Higbie - pianos, synthesizers and voice
- Mike Marshall - mandolins and guitars
- Michael Manring - Fretless bass, synthesizers and voice

Additional members included:

- Todd Philips - Bass
- Andy Narell - steel drums
- Tom Miller - percussion
- Will Kennedy - percussion

Philips, in particular, was a prominent member of the band early on, stemming from his connection with Anger and Marshall when they played together in the David Grisman Quintet.

== History ==
The group's roots are in Paris, where Darol Anger met Barbara Higbie in the late 1970s. They performed together and began writing music. They released their first album, Tideline, in 1982.

Anger met violinist David Balakrishnan through David Grisman, and with Mike Marshall they formed the band Saheeb in 1980. Around the same time, Anger met Will Ackerman, who was impressed by Anger's fiddling on the album Fiddlistics and asked him to record for Windham Hill.

Anger brought in long-time colleagues Mike Marshall and Todd Philips to join him and Higbie (they were later joined by Andy Narell). Balakrishnan left the band to study composition and Anger took on the violin roles full-time. In 1984, Anger, Phillips, Marshall Higbie and Narell performed at the Montreux Jazz Festival, and their recording during the festival marked the second album for the band.

In 1985, Anger and Marshall embarked on a separate project, focusing on their bluegrass roots. The result was Chiaroscuro, named for their love of the Italian culture. In addition to Higbie, Narell and Philips, Marshall and Anger brought in Michael Manring, a leading session recorder with Windham Hill, to record with them. The chemistry worked well between the group, and Manring joined the band full-time (Phillips left to pursue solo projects).

After extensive touring, the four core musicians wrote and recorded another album in 1987, Sign Language. Windham Hill recognized the group as the All Star band of the record label. Montreux's style became distinctive and unique, and by this time they adopted their band name. They also picked up Anne-Marie Martins as their agent and manager, who led them to become one of the most successful Windham Hill bands live. After more touring, the band got into the studio for the last time, creating Let Them Say in 1989.

In 1990, the band broke apart. Marshall went off to create the 'Modern Mandolin Quartet' (specializing in classical pieces arranged for mandolin) and recorded albums on Windham Hill. Anger, again with David Balakrishnan, formed the Turtle Island String Quartet in 1985 and left to pursue that group full-time. Manring and Higbie embarked on solo careers, with their initial solo albums being released on Windham Hill.

All members of the band still perform as of 2006, and Manring and Higbie reunited for the August 27, 2006 Windham Hill Records reunion concert in Saratoga, California. Though the band has not reunited since their initial breakup, Anger and Marshall still collaborate, and Higbie and Manring occasionally record with Marshall and/or Anger.

Since the BMG buyout of Windham Hill, no artist has returned to record on the record label, though their music is consistently recycled in new collections published by BMG (now Sony Music Entertainment).

== Popular tunes ==
Though many may not recognize Montreux's tunes by name, the group's music is often heard during radio shows and on commercials:

- "To Be" (Higbie) was featured on baby diaper commercials and was, for a short time, used by Rush Limbaugh during his radio show. National Public Radio occasionally uses it for their Fresh Air and Morning Edition programs. MTV also produced and filmed a music video of "To Be" in 1988 (shortly after the tune was nominated for a Grammy), and, as of 2006, showcases the video on their website.
- "Let Them Say" (Higbie and Marshall) is used as the promotional preview song for Fresh Air and Talk of the Nation on NPR and is usually heard every morning during the Morning Edition program.

== Discography ==
- Tideline (1982) (As 'Darol Anger/Barbara Higbie')
- Live at Montreux (1985) (As 'the Darol Anger/Barbara Higbie Quintet') (Grammy Award nomination for Best Engineering)
- Chiaroscuro (1985) (As 'Mike Marshall & Darol Anger')
- Sign Language (1987) (Grammy Award nominated for the song "To Be")
- Let Them Say (1989)
- Montreux: A Windham Hill Retrospective (1993) (a greatest hits compilation album; compiled by Windham Hill producer Robert 'Bob' Duskis)
