= Turtle Island Quartet =

American string quartet

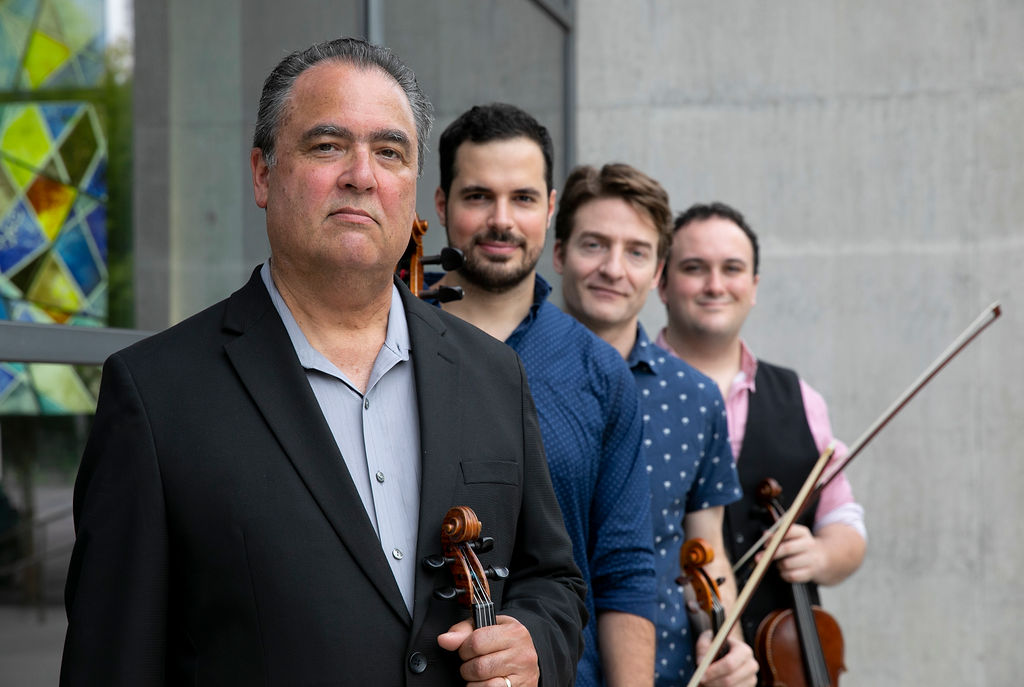
- (Front to back) David Balakrishnan, Naseem Alatrash, Benjamin von Gutzeit, Gabriel Terracciano

Background information
- Origin: San Francisco, California, U.S.
- Genres: Jazz, classical crossover
- Years active: 1985–present
- Labels: Windham Hill, Telarc, Azica, Blue Note
- Members: David Balakrishnan; Benjamin von Gutzeit; Gabriel Terracciano; Naseem Alatrash
- Past members: Darol Anger; Mark Summer; Irene Sazer; Mads Tolling; Jeremy Kittel; Tracy Silverman; Danny Seidenberg; Evan Price; Katrina Wreede; Laurie Moore; Jeremy Cohen; Mateusz Smoczynski; Alex Hargreaves; Malcolm Parson
- Website: turtleislandquartet.com

The Turtle Island Quartet is a string quartet that plays hybrids of jazz, classical, and rock music. The group was formed in 1985 by David Balakrishnan, Darol Anger, and Mark Summer in San Francisco. They released their first album on Windham Hill Records in 1988 with Irene Sazer.

== History ==
The group plays jazz standards and original compositions that cross several styles, including blues, classical, jazz, and world music. Violinist David Balakrishnan got the idea for a jazz string quartet in 1985. He invited cellist Mark Summer, who had been working for three years as a member of a Canadian orchestra. One of the first pieces they played was Balakrishnan's arrangement of "Stolen Moments" by Oliver Nelson which was released on their first album in 1987. The group's members have included violinist Evan Price and Danish violist Mads Tolling. Price and Tolling are both alumni of Berklee College of Music.

As a child, Balakrishnan was inspired by Jimi Hendrix. Then he discovered jazz and the music of the David Grisman Quartet.

Balakrishnan's arrangement of "A Night in Tunisia" by Dizzy Gillespie was nominated for a Grammy Award. The group won a Grammy Award for its version of A Love Supreme by John Coltrane.

The quartet has worked with Paquito D'Rivera, Ying Quartet, Edgar Meyer, the Manhattan Transfer, Modern Jazz Quartet, and the Detroit Symphony Orchestra.

== Members ==
Current

- David Balakrishnan – violin and baritone violin (original member) (1985–1993, 1997–present)
- Benjamin von Gutzeit – viola (2012–present)
- Naseem Alatrash – cello (2021–present)
- Gabriel Terracciano – violin (2018–present)

Past

- Mark Summer – cello (original member) (1985–2015)
- Darol Anger – violin and baritone violin (original member) (1985–1997)
- Laurie Moore – viola (original member) (1985–1987)
- Irene Sazer – viola (1987–1990)
- Katrina Wreede – viola and violin (1990–1992)
- Jeremy Cohen – viola (1992)
- Danny Seidenberg – viola (1992–2004)
- Tracy Silverman – violin (1993–1997)
- Evan Price – violin (1997–2007)
- Mads Tolling – viola (2004–2007), violin (2007–2012)
- Jeremy Kittel – viola (2008–2012)
- Mateusz Smoczynski – violin (2012–2015)
- Alex Hargreaves – violin (2016–2018)
- Malcolm Parson – cello (2016–2021)

== Awards ==
- Grammy Award for Best Classical Crossover Album, 4 + Four, 2005
- Grammy Award for Best Classical Crossover Album, A Love Supreme: The Legacy of John Coltrane, 2007

== Discography ==
- Turtle Island String Quartet (Windham Hill, 1988)
- Metropolis (Windham Hill, 1989)
- Skylife (Windham Hill, 1990)
- A Shock to the System (Windham Hill, 1990)
- On the Town (Windham Hill, 1991)
- Spider Dreams (Windham Hill, 1992)
- Who Do We Think We Are? (Windham Hill, 1994)
- A Night in Tunisia, A Week in Detroit (Chandos, 1994)
- By the Fireside (Windham Hill, 1995)
- The Hamburg Concert (CCn'C Records, 1997)
- Art of the Groove (Koch, 2000)
- Danzon (Koch, 2002)
- 4 + Four with the Ying Quartet (Telarc, 2005)
- A Love Supreme: The Legacy of John Coltrane (Telarc, 2007)
- Have You Ever Been..?: The Music of Jimi Hendrix and David Balakrishnan (Telarc, 2010)
- Mike Marshall and the Turtle Island Quartet (Adventure, 2014)
- Confetti Man (Azica, 2014)
- Bird's Eye View (Azica, 2018)
- Absence with Terence Blanchard (Blue Note, 2021)
