= ArtistWorks =

Online music education platform

ArtistWorks, LLC is an online music learning education platform based out of Napa, CA. ArtistWorks was founded by David and Patricia Butler in 2008. The company developed a proprietary patented system for interacting with teachers based upon online Video Exchange Learning which students use to upload videos of themselves playing and ArtistWorks instructors respond with video feedback with both videos paired together and made visible for all students in the online course.

ArtistWorks has enlisted over 35 different well-known master musicians including Paul Gilbert, Nathan East, Tony Trischka, Peter Erskine, Mike Marshall and many more, who have recorded extensive online music lessons that players can learn from, whether or not they submit a video.

== Headquarters ==
ArtistWorks, LLC.'s main office and headquarters are located at 68 Coombs St., Suite C1 in Napa, CA 94559

== Background ==
After his retirement as an executive from AOL in 1999, David Butler began his quest to learn jazz guitar but had difficulty finding an adequate local instructor. He turned to many books and tapes but found those resources frustrating and inadequate. The idea of ArtistWorks stemmed from his desire to democratize access to master musicians. His wish to connect students from all over the world with accomplished players was the basis for developing ArtistWorks. In 2008 the company was launched by Butler and his wife, Patricia Butler, who went on to develop this platform for quality interactive online instruction.

In 2018 ArtistWorks launched the "ArtistWorks Music Certificate Program," a 12-week structured online learning experience with four skill levels. The Program uses both patented technology and academic accreditation from the Western Association of Schools and Colleges as a Supplemental Education Provider(2017). ArtistWorks has also made this program available for high schools, offering school credit to students. Courses include instruction in blues guitar and ukulele. ArtistWorks has developed an industry-unique automated scoring rubric that will be used for mass assessment of Certificate Program students’ performance skills.

In 2019 ArtistWorks launched a new podcast focusing on interviews with master musicians called the “ArtistWorks Music Series.” The first episode includes an interview with Mike Marshall and is titled “The Blurring of Bluegrass.”

On June 25, 2021, ArtistWorks was acquired by the Growth Catalyst Partners portfolio company TrueFire Studios, a consortium of online music instruction companies. ArtistWorks' Video Exchange Learning continued as its exclusive program.

== Patents ==
ArtistWorks applied for the first patent on its video management system referred to as the Video Exchange Learning® platform in 2008. The first patent (US 9,165,473) that was issued in June 2015 provides for online students of any subject to learn from an online video lesson library that has within it, a request for students to submit a video to the teacher for evaluation. When students upload a video for review, the teacher receives their video in a management queue and responds with a newly recorded video of instruction and guidance specific to the needs of the student who submitted the video. The system then keeps both videos tied together and displays the paired videos to a library that is visible to all online students of the course being offered.

The second patent (US 9,812,025) issued in November 2017 broadened the original claims pertaining to the teachers’ end of the video management system. The third issued patent (US 10, 147,333) in December 2018 further broadened other existing claims pertaining to the processing of the two videos. The current Video Exchange Learning® platform teaches music to learners within 35 different music courses offered at ArtistWorks, LLC although the underlying concept of the patented system is subject agnostic.

== Launch and courses ==
ArtistWorks, LLC. was founded on September 25, 2008, but the first online music lesson course did not launch until May of 2009. The first course was led by artist DJ Qbert. Following the launch of the DJ Skratch Lessons school, ArtistWorks proceeded to launch the following schools:

- ArtistWorks Jazz & More Guitar Lessons with Andreas Oberg in June 2009
- ArtistWorks Banjo Lessons with Tony Trischka in July 2009
- ArtistWorks Piano Lessons with Christie Peery in September 2009
- ArtistWorks Harmonica Lessons with Howard Levy in December 2009
- ArtistWorks Fingerstyle Guitar Lessons with Martin Taylor in April 2010
- ArtistWorks Mandolin Lessons with Mike Marshall in June 2011
- ArtistWorks Bluegrass Flatpick Guitar Lessons with Bryan Sutton in June 2011
- ArtistWorks Fiddle Lessons with Darol Anger in June 2011
- ArtistWorks Bluegrass Bass Lessons with Missy Raines in June 2011
- ArtistWorks Bluegrass Dobro Lessons with Andy Hall in January 2012
- ArtistWorks Percussion Lessons with Luis Conte in March 2012
- ArtistWorks Rock Guitar Lessons with Paul Gilbert in May 2012
- ArtistWorks Classical Guitar Lessons with Jason Vieaux in June 2012
- ArtistWorks Jazz Bass Lessons with John Patitucci in June 2012
- ArtistWorks Electric Bass Lessons with Nathan East in June 2012
- ArtistWorks Clarinet Lessons with Ricardo Morales in June 2012
- ArtistWorks Trumpet Lessons with David Bilger in September 2012
- ArtistWorks Flute Lessons with Jeffrey Khaner in October 2012
- ArtistWorks Vocal Lessons with the late Jeannie Deva in October 2012
- ArtistWorks French Horn Lessons with William Caballero in January 2013
- ArtistWorks Art Lessons with Justin Bua in July 2013, which later closed in February 2016
- ArtistWorks Music Theory Lessons with Jonathan Coopersmith in September 2013 which is available free to all students
- ArtistWorks Acoustic Guitar 101 Lessons with Scott Law in December 2013 which was available free to all students and the public until May 2020.
- ArtistWorks Jazz Guitar Lessons with Chuck Loeb in April 2014
- ArtistWorks Blues Guitar Lessons with Keith Wyatt in December 2014
- ArtistWorks Popular Piano Lessons with Hugh Sung in December 2014
- ArtistWorks Violin Lessons with Nathan Cole in February 2015 which later closed in February 2018
- ArtistWorks Multi-Style Cello Lessons with Mike Block in August 2015
- ArtistWorks Jazz Saxophone Lessons with Eric Marienthal in September 2015
- ArtistWorks Jazz Piano Lessons with George Whitty in October 2015
- ArtistWorks Electric Country Guitar Lessons with Guthrie Trapp in October 2015
- ArtistWorks Classical Mandolin Lessons with Caterina Lichtenberg in January 2016
- ArtistWorks Ukulele Lessons with Craig Chee and Sarah Maisel in March 2016
- ArtistWorks Bluegrass Vocals Lessons with Michael Daves in June 2016
- ArtistWorks Jazz Drums Lessons with Peter Erskine in October 2016
- ArtistWorks Country Vocals Lessons with Lari White in October 2016, this course is in archive form only as Lari White died in January 2018
- ArtistWorks Classical Violin Lessons with Richard Amoroso in February 2018
- ArtistWorks Jazz Guitar Lessons with Dave Stryker in March 2018

== Events ==
ArtistWorks has hosted several onsite master classes. In January 2019 they hosted bluegrass artists Bryan Sutton and Andy Hall at their Napa headquarters and flew contest winners in to participate in the Big Bluegrass Giveaway. The Big Ukulele Giveaway with Craig Chee and Sarah Maisel followed at the end of January 2019. The company hosted the Big Jazz Giveaway with John Patitucci, George Whitty, Eric Marienthal and Peter Erskine in April 2019 and the Big Bluegrass Virtual Masterclass with Mike Marshall, Tony Trischka and Michael Daves in July 2019. In December 2019 the company hosted a guitar getaway and master class featuring Nathan East, Guthrie Trapp and Keith Wyatt.
