= Sono Luminus =

American music record label

- Founded: 1995
- Founder: Sandy Lerner, Leonard Bosack
- Distributor: Naxos Records
- Genre: Classical
- Country of origin: U.S.
- Location: Boyce, Virginia
- Official website: www.sonoluminus.com

Sono Luminus is a classical music record label founded by Sandy Lerner and Leonard Bosack, who also founded Cisco Systems. The label specializes in high-resolution recordings of acoustic music.

== History ==
Sono Luminus was created in 1995 by Cisco Systems founders Sandy Lerner and Leonard Bosack. They founded Sono Luminus intending to capture real performances through microphone placement and quality acoustic spaces rather than post-production techniques.

In 2005, after producing recordings for several major and independent labels, Sono Luminus purchased Dorian Recordings, a label that specialized in early music. The acquisition of the Dorian catalog gave them an archive of early music, Latin American recordings, and folk music.

After the purchase, Sono Luminus released two additional albums under the "Dorian" name. From 2005 to 2010, after releasing only two albums under the "Dorian" name, the company then followed by 47 releases as "Dorian Sono Luminus."

In January 2011, the name "Dorian" was dropped, and beginning in February every new release had the Sono Luminus logo.

== Grammy awards ==
- 2010 Best Engineered Album, Classical, Quincy Porter: Complete Viola Works, by Eliesha Nelson; Brandie Lane, engineer
- 2012 Best Classical Album (Latin Grammy), Brasileiro: Works of Francisco Mignone by Cuarteto Latinoamericano; Daniel Shores, engineer, Dan Merceruio, producer

== Grammy nominations ==
- 2008 Best Small Ensemble – Das Lied Von der Erde by The Smithsonian Chamber Players
- 2009 Best Classical Crossover – Indigo Road by Ronn McFarlane
- 2010 Best Chamber Music Performance – Quincy Porter: Complete Viola Works by Eliesha Nelson
- 2010 Best Chamber Music Performance – Radames Gnattali: Solo & Chamber Works for Guitar by Marc Regnier
- 2010 Best Instrumental Soloist Performance (without orchestra) – 20th Century Harp Sonatas by Sarah Schuster Ericsson
- 2010 Best Instrumental Soloist Performance (with orchestra) – Quincy Porter: Complete Viola Works by Eliesha Nelson
- 2010 Best Opera Recording – Hasse: Marc' Antonio e Cleopatra by Ars Lyrica Houston
- 2011 Best Small Ensemble – Kingdoms of Castille by El Mundo
- 2012 Best Classical Instrumental Solo – The Complete Harpsichord Works of Rameau by Jory Vinikour
- 2012 Best Chamber Music/Small Ensemble – Mind Meld by ZOFO
- 2012 Best Chamber Music/Small Ensemble – Rupa–khandha by Los Angeles Percussion Quartet
- 2012 Best Chamber Music/Small Ensemble – Americana by Modern Mandolin Quartet
- 2012 Best Engineered Classical Album – Americana by Modern Mandolin Quartet; Daniel Shores–engineer
- 2012 Best Surround Sound Album – Rupa–khandha by Los Angeles Percussion Quartet; Daniel Shores–engineer
- 2012 Producer of the Year, Classical – Dan Merceruio
- 2013 Best Surround Sound Album – Sprung Rhythm by Inscape; Daniel Shores, surround mix engineer; Daniel Shores, surround mastering engineer; Dan Merceruio, surround producer
- 2015 Best Classical Instrumental Solo – "Toccatas" by Jory Vinikour
- 2015 Producer of the Year, Classical – Dan Merceruio

== Other awards ==
- 2007 Audio Engineering Society’s Award of Excellence in High Resolution Audio
