= Darol Anger =

American violinist (born 1953)

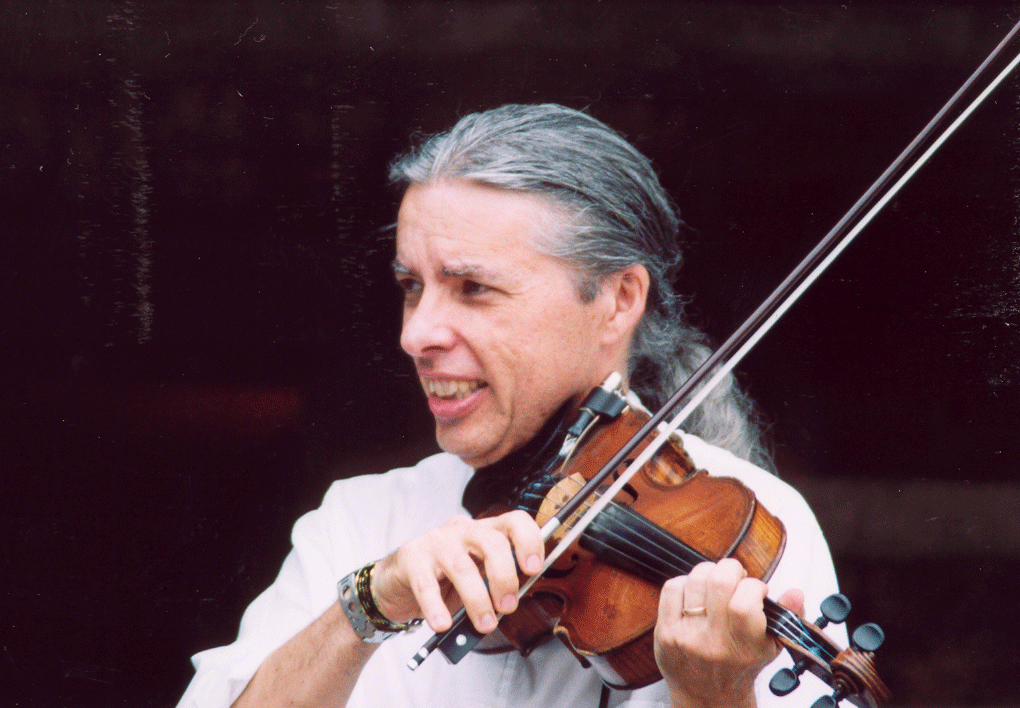
- Anger performing at MerleFest in Wilkesboro, North Carolina, 2004

Background information
- Born: May 7, 1953 (age 73); San Francisco, California, U.S.
- Genres: Progressive bluegrass; folk; chamber jazz; new-age
- Occupation: Musician
- Instrument: Violin
- Years active: 1977–present
- Labels: Compass; Windham Hill; Six Degrees; Rounder; Kaleidoscope
- Website: darolanger.com

Darol Robert Anger is an American violinist and founding member of the David Grisman Quintet.

== Career ==
Anger entered popular music at the age of 21 as a founding member of The David Grisman Quintet. Anger played fiddle to David Grisman's mandolin in The David Grisman Quintet's (DGQ) 1977 debut. He co-founded and named the Turtle Island String Quartet with David Balakrishnan in 1985 and performed, composed, and arranged for the chamber jazz group. He frequently collaborates with fellow DGQ alumnus Mike Marshall.

Anger met pianist Barbara Higbie in Paris and formed a musical partnership with her. Together they released an early record on Windham Hill, Tideline (1982). Two years later, they formed a group called The Darol Anger/Barbara Higbie Quintet with Mike Marshall, Todd Phillips, and Andy Narell. This group performed at the 1984 Montreux Jazz Festival. The quintet later took the name Montreux. After two studio releases, the band broke up in 1990, and Anger continued with the Turtle Island String Quartet, founded in 1985. He still collaborates with Montreux and fellow Psychograss colleague, Mike Marshall, and occasionally also collaborates with Barbara Higbie and Michael Manring.

Using classical, folk, and jazz music as springboards, he currently leads Republic of Strings, founded with Scott Nygaard. He also co-founded The Duo (with Mike Marshall), Psychograss (the bluegrass group including Mike Marshall, mandolin; Todd Phillips, bass; David Grier, guitar; and Tony Trischka, banjo), Fiddlers 4 (with Michael Doucet, Bruce Molsky, violins; and Rushad Eggleston, cello), and Mr Sun (with Joe K. Walsh, Grant Gordy, and Aidan O'Donnell). Anger also plays frequently with pianist Phil Aaberg. He has performed or recorded with musicians ranging from Tony Rice, Stephane Grappelli and Mark O'Connor to Marin Alsop, Bill Evans, Nickel Creek, Chris Thile & Punch Brothers, Yonder Mountain String Band, Béla Fleck, Taarka and Anonymous 4. He can also be heard on the NPR's Car Talk theme song. He is a MacDowell and UCross Fellow.

Since 2022 Anger has lived in Nashville, Tennessee, after moving from his long-time home in the San Francisco Bay Area. He has completed the construction of 2 violins under the guidance of luthier Jonathan Cooper and was in 2010 named Associate Professor at the Berklee College of Music. He is now professor emeritus at Berklee.

In June 2011 he began teaching online at the Online Fiddle School with Darol Anger, as part of the ArtistWorks Academy of Bluegrass.

He was the Artist at Large at the 2018 John Hartford Memorial Festival.

== Discography ==
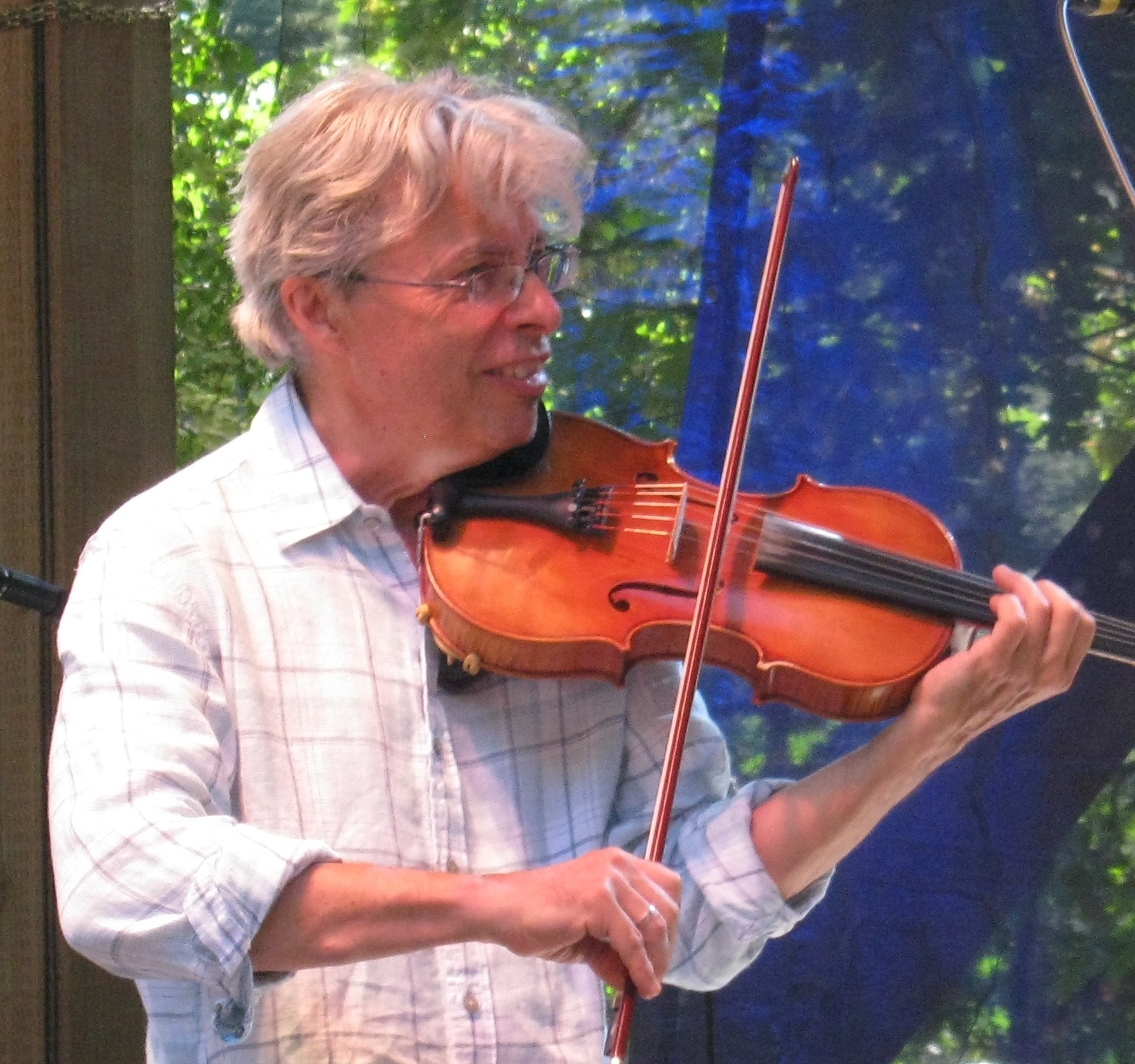
Darol Anger on stage at the Northwest String Summit on July 21, 2013

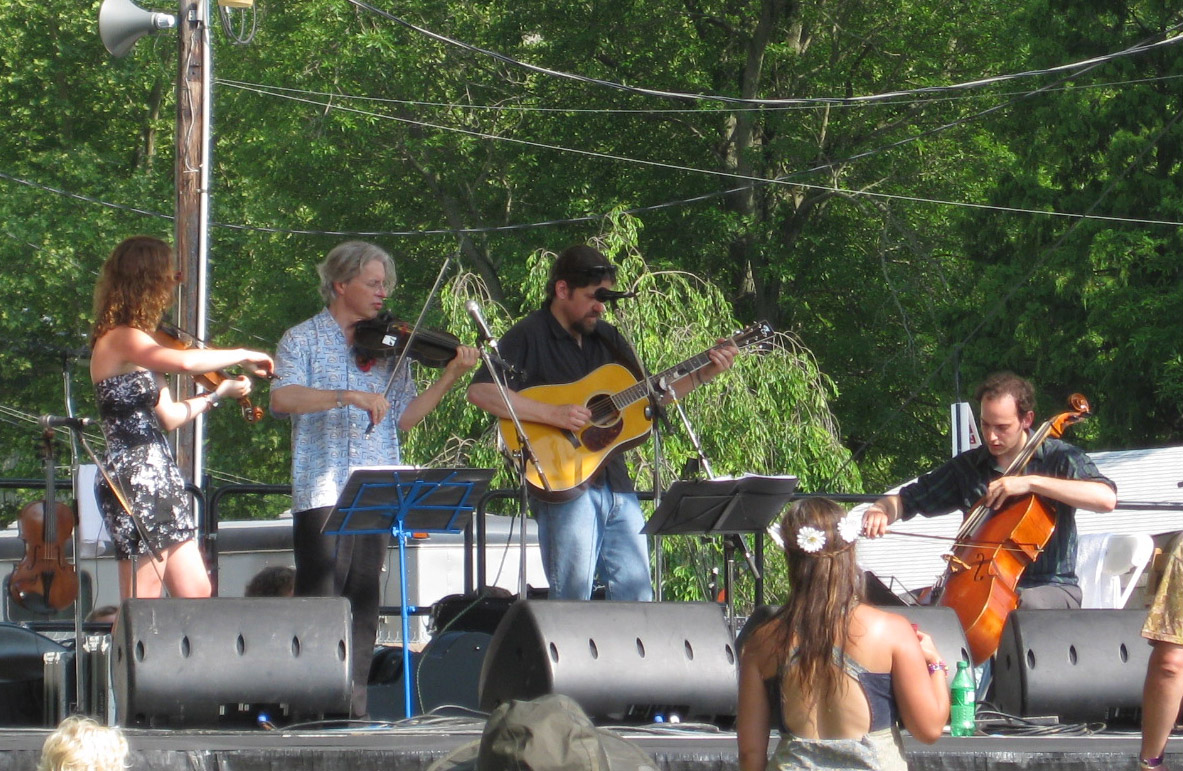
Republic of Strings at DelFest, 2010

- 1979 Fiddlistics
- 1982 Tideline – with Barbara Higbie
- 1983 The Duo – with Mike Marshall
- 1984 Live at Montreux '84
- 1985 Jazz Violin Celebration
- 1985 Chiaroscuro
- 1987 Sign Language
- 1989 Let Them Say
- 1993 Psychograss
- 1996 Heritage
- 1997 At Home and on the Range
- 1998 Christmas Heritage
- 1997 Like Minds
- 1999 Jam
- 1999 Diary of a Fiddler
- 2000 Brand New Can
- 2001 Now Hear This
- 2002 Fiddlers 4 – with Bruce Molsky, Michael Doucet, and Rushad Eggleston
- 2005 Republic of Strings
- 2007 Generation Nation
- 2007 Woodshop
- 2007 Mike Marshall and Darol Anger with Väsen
- 2008 Cross Time – with Philip Aaberg
- 2014 Eand'a
- 2025 Diary of a Fiddler #2: The Empty Nest

=== Republic of Strings ===
- 2004 Republic of Strings
- 2006 Generation Nation

=== Mr Sun ===
- 2015 The People Need Light
- 2022 Extrovert
- 2023 Mr Sun Plays Duke Ellington's Nutcracker Suite

=== With Bruce Molsky ===
- 2024 Darol & Bruce: Lockdown Breakdown
