= Mike Marshall (musician) =

American mandolinist (born 1957)

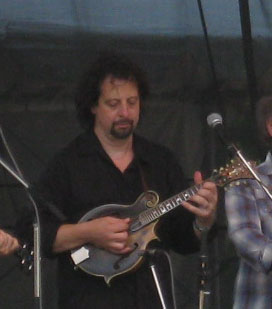
- Marshall in 2011

Background information
- Born: Michael James Marshall; July 17, 1957 (age 69); New Castle, Pennsylvania, U.S.
- Genres: Bluegrass, classical, jazz
- Occupation: Musician
- Instruments: Mandolin, guitar, violin
- Years active: 1979–present
- Labels: Rounder, Windham Hill, Compass, Sony Classical, Adventure
- Website: mikemarshall.net

Mike Marshall (born Michael James Marshall, July 17, 1957, in New Castle, Pennsylvania) is a mandolinist who has collaborated with David Grisman and Darol Anger.

He grew up in Lakeland, Florida. When he was 18, he won Florida statewide contests on fiddle and mandolin. He considers his discovery of David Grisman's music a significant event in his life, admiring how Grisman fused jazz and Latin styles into his own form of bluegrass. After moving to California, Marshall collaborated with Grisman on film music and joined his quintet. He was a member of the David Grisman Quintet from 1985 to 1990, touring with Jerry Douglas, Béla Fleck, Tony Rice, Mark O'Connor, Stéphane Grappelli, and Darol Anger.

Marshall and Anger collaborated often during their careers. They founded Montreux, with Barbara Higbie and Michael Manring, and the supergroup Psychograss, with Tony Trischka and Todd Phillips. Like Grisman, both groups played an eclectic style of music that combined classical, folk, jazz, and bluegrass. Marshall has performed Brazilian music with the band Choro Famoso and on his second solo album, Brazil: Duets. He released his debut solo album, Gator Strut, in 1989.

Marshall is a virtuoso on the mandolin. He plays a 1924 Gibson F-5 mandolin signed by Lloyd Loar. He helped start the Modern Mandolin Quartet. He collaborated with mandolinist Chris Thile on Into the auldron in 2003. His wife, Caterina Lichtenberg, is a German classical mandolinist. He and Lichtenberg teach online mandolin lessons through ArtistWorks.

== Discography ==
Year	Album	Chart positions		Label
Year	Album	US Bluegrass	US Country	Label
1985	Chiaroscuro			Windham Hill
1987	Gator Strut			Rounder
1996	Brasil: Duets			Rhino
1998	Midnight Clear			Acorn
2001	Wine Country			Menus and Music
2002	At Home and on the Range			Compass
2003	Into the Cauldron (with Chris Thile)	6	71	Sugar Hill
2003	Serenata			Adventure
2004	Mike Marshall & Choro Famoso			Adventure
2005	Brazil Duets			Adventure
2006	Live: Duets (with Chris Thile)	6		Sugar Hill
2006	New Words (Novas Palavras)			Adventure
2007	Mike Marshall and Darol Anger with Vasen			Adventure
2009	Mike Marshall, Alex Hargreaves and Paul Kowert as Big Trio			Adventure
2010	Caterina Lichtenberg and Mike Marshall			Adventure
2013	Mike Marshall & the Turtle Island Quartet			Adventure
2014	Segunda Vez with Choro Famoso			Adventure
2015	J.S. Bach with Caterina Lichtenberg			Adventure
2018	Third Journey with Caterina Lichtenberg			Adventure
