= David Balakrishnan =

American violinist and composer

David Balakrishnan (born 1954, Los Angeles, California) is the founder of the Turtle Island Quartet.

== Life ==
After graduating from UCLA in 1976 with a B.A. in music composition and violin, he moved to the San Francisco Bay Area, where he quickly established his reputation as a talented young improvising violinist, appearing on many recordings and making guest appearances with the David Grisman Quartet and jazz violin legend Stephane Grappelli. In 1981 he undertook a master's degree program in music composition at Antioch University West, where his groundbreaking work integrating stylistic elements of jazz, European classical, American folk and Indian classical music led to the creation of the Turtle Island Quartet in the fall of 1985.

His tenure with TIQ has included several recordings on labels such as Windham Hill, Chandos, Koch and Telarc, which released their most recent CD, 2008 Grammy winning “A Love Supreme: The Legacy Of John Coltrane.” Their previous Telarc release, “4+Four,” in collaboration with the Ying Quartet, also won a Grammy in the same category, Classical Crossover, in 2006. Balakrishnan has also himself received two GRAMMY nominations in the category of best instrumental arrangement, the first for his arrangement of Dizzy Gillespie's "A Night In Tunisia" from TIQ's first recording, and the second for his arrangement of “You’ve Changed,” from their 2002 release Danzón, featuring clarinetist Paquito D’Rivera. Other TIQ credits include soundtracks for major motion pictures, TV and radio credits such as the Today Show and All Things Considered, feature articles in People and Newsweek magazines, and collaborations with famed artists such as The Manhattan Transfer, pianists Billy Taylor and Kenny Barron, the Ying Quartet and the Parsons Dance Company.

Balakrishnan has been awarded numerous composing grants, both from private sources such as conductor Marin Alsop, who commissioned his piece for violin and orchestra, “Little Mouse Jumps,” as well as national service organizations such as the National Endowment for the Arts and Meet The Composer foundations. In 2005 he received a MTC/ASOL “Music Alive” three year extended residency with the Nashville Chamber Orchestra, for which he is composing six orchestral works. The NCO also commissioned Balakrishnan's composition “Darkness Dreaming,” which premiered in April 2004 with guitarists Sharon Isbin and John Jorgenson. His piece, “Spider Dreams” (1992), has been widely performed and recorded throughout the world by a diverse array of musical organizations, including a live recording by Turtle Island with the Detroit Symphony Orchestra conducted by Neeme Järvi on Chandos Records. A 2002 commission awarded by a consortium of presenters headed by the Lied Center of Kansas City resulted in a string octet entitled “Mara’s Garden Of False Delights,” which is featured on Turtle Island Quartet’s Grammy winning Telarc release, “4 plus Four.” His most recent commission is again from the Lied Center, who received a Creative Campus grant from the Duke foundation, for which Balakrishnan is composing a full-length work involving theatre, dance, video, and Turtle Island with the KU wind ensemble that is an artistic response to the social issues concerning the various theories of evolution, both scientific and cultural, entitled “The Tree Of Life.”

== Compositions and performances ==
Trishula, for violin and symphony orchestra

premiered June 2007 at Schermerhorn Symphony Hall in Nashville by violinist Gilles Apap and the Nashville Chamber Orchestra, conducted by Paul Gambill.

Groove In The Louvre, for guitar, string quartet and string orchestra

premiered September 2006 for the inauguration of the Schermerhorn Symphony Hall in Nashville by guitarist John Jorgenson, the Turtle Island Quartet and the Nashville Chamber Orchestra, conducted by Paul Gambill.

The Second Wave, for guitar and string octet

premiered March 2006 in Nashville by guitarist John Jorgenson, the Turtle Island Quartet and the section leaders of the Nashville Chamber Orchestra, conducted by Paul Gambill.

Confetti Man, for String Orchestra

premiered March 2006 in Nashville by the Nashville Chamber Orchestra conducted by Paul Gambill.

Darkness Dreaming, for violin, two guitars and Chamber Orchestra

premiered April 2004 in Nashville by the composer, classical guitarist Sharon Isbin, jazz guitarist John Jorgenson, and the Nashville Chamber Orchestra conducted by Paul Gambill.

Mara's Garden Of False Delights, for string octet

premiered October 2002 at the Lied Center at the University of Kansas, by the Turtle Island and Ying quartets. Several subsequent performances at performing arts centers across the country.

InterPlay for Mandolin Quartet and Violin

premiered January 1997 at the Hult Performing Art Center in Eugene, Oregon by the Modern Mandolin Quartet and the composer on violin. Subsequent performances by the MMQ and the composer as well as other violinists such as Darol Anger and Jeremy Cohen. Rearranged in 2002 for TIQ and Orchestra, version premiered March 2002 in Aalborg Denmark by TIQ and the Aalborg symphony, conducted by Svenn Skipper.

Concertino For Jazz Violin And Orchestra: Little Mouse Jumps

premiered September 1995 at the Hult Performing Art Center in Eugene, Oregon by the Eugene Symphony Orchestra, conducted by Marin Alsop Re-arranged in 2000 for TIQ and Orchestra, premiered by the Peoria Symphony, conducted by David Commanday. Several subsequent performances in Europe and America

Spider Dreams, seven movements for jazz string orchestra

premiered July 1992 at the Cabrillo festival, Santa Cruz, CA, the Cabrillo Festival Orchestra, conducted by Marin Alsop

performed March 1993 at Alice Tully Hall at Lincoln Center in New York by the Turtle Island Quartet and the Concordia Orchestra, conducted by Marin Alsop

performed May 1994 at the Hult Performing Art Center in Eugene, Oregon by the Turtle Island Quartet and the Eugene Symphony Orchestra, conducted by Marin Alsop

performed May 1994 at Symphony Hall in Detroit by the Turtle Island Quartet and the Detroit Symphony Orchestra, conducted by Neeme Järvi

Ongoing performance schedule with the TISQ and other orchestras throughout the world.

The Iron Fist Of Fashion, two movements for string quartet and big band

premiered March 1991 at Yoshi's Nitespot by the Bay Area Jazz Composers' Orchestra, conducted by John English

performed April 1993 at the Freight and Salvage by the Bay Area Jazz Composers' Orchestra and the Turtle Island Quartet, conducted by John English

== Turtle Island History ==
1987-present--Numerous performances of various original compositions for string quartet with the Turtle Island Quartet in concert halls and jazz clubs throughout the USA, Canada, Europe and the Orient, including Carnegie Hall, Alice Tully Hall, Symphony Hall, Davies Hall, Royce Hall, etc.

Television appearances on the "Today show," "CBS Sunday Morning," the "Disney Channel," the "Discovery channel," and various local news and entertainment shows throughout the USA, Canada, Europe, and Asia.

Radio shows such as "All Things Considered," "Morning Edition," "New Sounds," "West Coast Weekend," etc.

Collaborations with the Manhattan Transfer, Paquito D’Rivera, Modern Jazz Quartet, David Parsons Dance Company, Billy Taylor Trio, Stephane Grappelli, David Grisman, etc.

== Recordings (compositions) ==
Confetti Man, Turtle Island Quartet, Azica Records, 2014.

A Love Supreme: The legacy Of John Coltrane, Turtle Island Quartet, Telarc Records, 2007.

4+Four, Turtle Island String Quartet with Ying Quartet, Telarc Records, 2005.

“Mara’s Garden Of False Delights” three movements for string octet

Danzón, Turtle Island String Quartet with Paquito D’Rivera, Koch International Classics, 2002.

“Little Mouse Jumps” for string quartet

Art Of The Groove, Turtle Island String Quartet, Koch International Classics, 2000.

“Fruitcake” for string quartet

InterPlay, Modern Mandolin Quartet with David Balakrishnan, D’note Records, 1999.

“InterPlay,” four movements for mandolin quartet and violin

The Hamburg Concert, Turtle Island String Quartet, CC&C Records, 1998.

Skylife, three movements of Spider Dreams, for string quartet

A Night In Tunisia, A Night In Detroit, Detroit Symphony Orchestra, Turtle Island String Quartet, conducted by Neeme Järvi, Chandos, 1994. Two movements from "Spider Dreams."

Spider Dreams, Turtle Island String Quartet, Windham Hill Jazz, 1992.

"Spider Dreams," seven movements for string orchestra, "The Iron Fist Of Fashion," two movements for string quartet and big band

On The Town, Turtle Island String Quartet, Windham Hill Jazz, 1991.

Skylife, Turtle Island String Quartet, Windham Hill Jazz, 1990.

"Skylife," "Tremors," for string quartet

Metropolis, Turtle Island String Quartet, Windham Hill Jazz, 1990.

"Mr. Bumbles," for string quartet

Turtle Island String Quartet, Windham Hill Jazz, 1988.

"Balapadam," four movements for string quartet
