= Tony Trischka =

American five-string banjo player (born 1949)

- Born: Anthony Cattell Trischka; January 16, 1949 (age 77); Syracuse, New York, U.S.
- Genres: Bluegrass, country
- Occupations: Musician, educator
- Instrument: Banjo
- Years active: 1970s–present
- Labels: Rounder, Smithsonian Folkways, Shefa Records
- Website: www.tonytrischka.com

Anthony Cattell Trischka (born January 16, 1949) is an American five-string banjo player. Sandra Brennan wrote of him in 2020: "One of the most influential modern banjoists, both in several forms of bluegrass music and occasionally in jazz and avant-garde, Tony Trischka has inspired a whole generation of progressive psychedelic bluegrass musicians."

== Music career ==
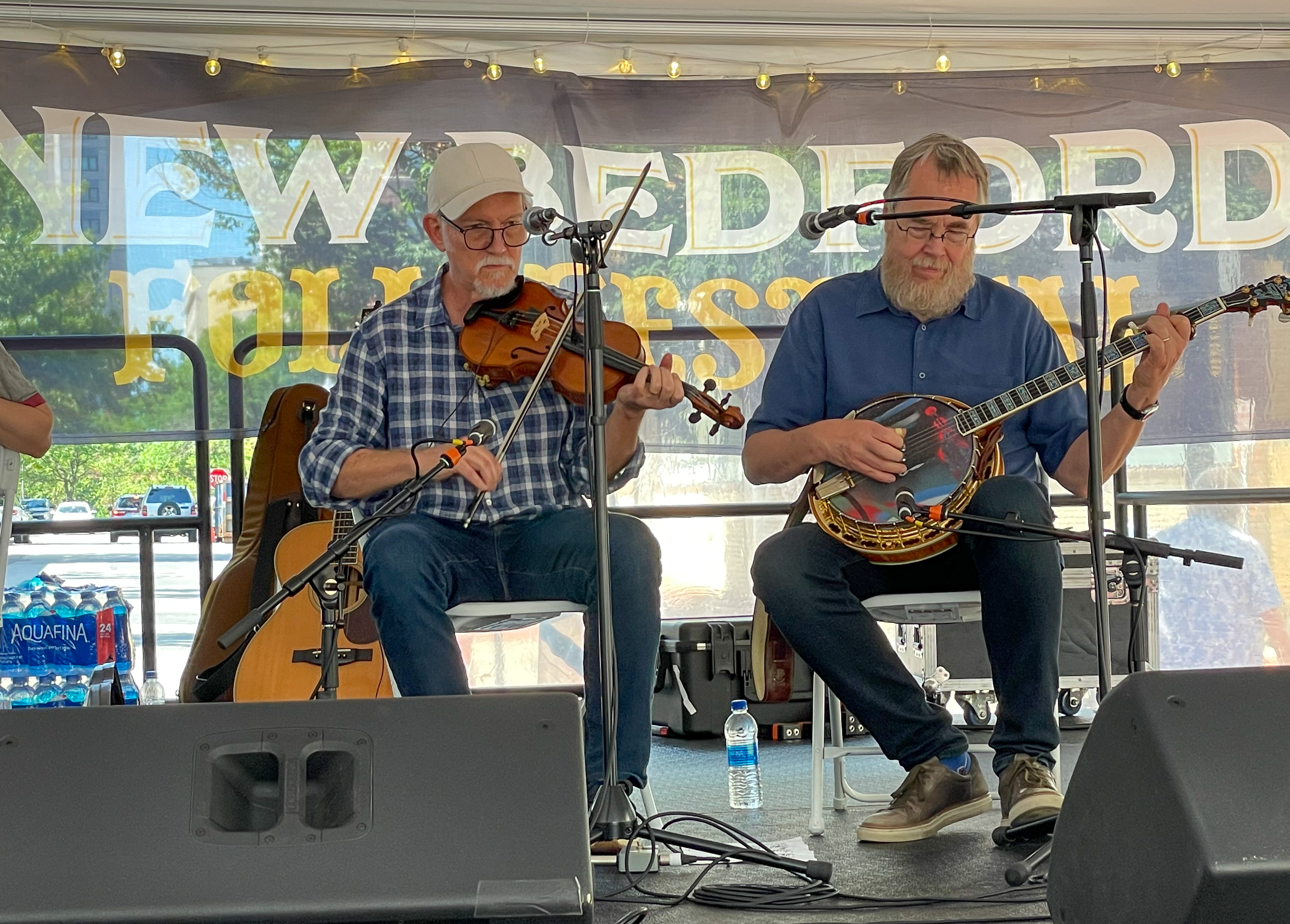
Bruce Molsky (L) and Tony Trischka at the 2022 New Bedford Folk Festival

A native of Syracuse, New York, Trischka's interest in banjo was sparked by the Kingston Trio's version of "Charlie and the MTA" in 1963. Two years later, he joined the Down City Ramblers, where he remained through 1971. That year, he made his recording debut on 15 Bluegrass Instrumentals with the band Country Cooking; at the same time, he was also a member of America's premier sports-rock band Country Granola.

In 1973, he began a three-year stint with Breakfast Special. Between 1974 and 1975, he recorded two solo albums, Bluegrass Light and Heartlands. Ethnomusicologist Benjamin Krakauer devotes an article to the legacy of this group in the bluegrass community, described as of experimental bluegrass musicians from New York City:

Breakfast Special's innovative music incorporates jazz, avant-garde, psychedelic, klezmer, and various non- Western musical elements into their irreverent and often absurdist performances

. This researcher explores the question of why their music has never been absorbed into the bluegrass mainstream, while the newgrass and progressive blue-grass of many of their innovative peers was widely embraced : Benjamin Krakauer argues:

that breakfast Special’s eclecticism and related aesthetic choices made their music inaccessible to many bluegrass audiences and that the unfa-miliar aspects of this music and its presentation exacerbated conservative southern white audiences’ anxieties over the performers’ regional, ethnic, religious, and cultural otherness

After one more solo album in 1976, Banjoland, he went on to become musical leader for the Broadway show The Robber Bridegroom. Trischka toured with the show in 1978, the year he also played with the Monroe Doctrine. In 1978, Trischka toured Japan and recorded with Peter Rowan and Richard Greene. In the early 1980s, he began recording with his group Skyline, which released its first album in 1983. Later albums included Robot Plane Flies over Arkansas (solo, 1983), Stranded in the Moonlight (with Skyline, 1984) and Hill Country (solo, 1985). In 1984, he performed in his first feature film, Foxfire. Three years later, he worked on the pre-recorded music for the off-Broadway production of Driving Miss Daisy that featured Jessica Tandy and Morgan Freeman. Trischka produced the Belgian group Gold Rush's No More Angels in 1988. The following year, Skyline recorded its final album, Fire of Grace. He also recorded the theme song for Books on the Air, a popular National Public Radio show, and continued his affiliation with the network by appearing on Garrison Keillor's Prairie Home Companion, Mountain Stage, From Our Front Porch, and other radio shows. Trischka continued his recording career with 1993's World Turning, 1995's Glory Shone Around: A Christmas Collection and 1999's Bend. New Deal followed in 2003.

Double Banjo Bluegrass Spectacular, featuring appearances by Steve Martin, Earl Scruggs, Béla Fleck and Tony Rice, came out four years later. For this recording Trischka went back to bluegrass and reinvigorated the double banjo tradition. In October 2007, he was given an IBMA (International Bluegrass Music Association) award for Banjo Player of the Year 2007. Double Banjo Bluegrass Spectacular received IBMA awards for Recorded Event of the Year, Instrumental Album of the Year and a Grammy Nomination.

He has written over fifteen instructional books and a series of DVDs. In July 2009 he launched the groundbreaking Online Banjo School with Tony Trischka, an interactive, online learning school that teaches students around the world how to play banjo with ArtistWorks. Trischka is closely associated with "newgrass," which features several innovations to traditional bluegrass, including jazzy arrangements, non-traditional chordal structures, and frequent covers of non-bluegrass songs. Trischka is one of the major innovators of the "chromatic" banjo style, which features sinewy, snaky melodic runs not strictly played out of chord positions.

2011 saw Give Me the Banjo aired on PBS stations nationwide with Trischka as the musical director and co-producer of the documentary. It was released on DVD. He produced Steve Martin's Grammy-nominated Rare Bird Alert (Rounder), which features performances by Paul McCartney, the Dixie Chicks and the Steep Canyon Rangers.

In December 2012, Trischka was awarded the United States Artists Friends Fellow in recognition of the excellence of his work.

== Discography ==
=== As leader ===
- Bluegrass Light (Rounder, 1974)
- Heartlands (Rounder, 1975)
- Banjoland (Rounder, 1977)
- Fiddle Tunes for Banjo with Bill Keith and Béla Fleck (Rounder, 1981)
- A Robot Plane Flies over Arkansas (Rounder, 1983)
- Hill Country (Rounder, 1985)
- Alone & Together with Beppe Gambetta (Brambus, 1991)
- Solo Banjo Works with Béla Fleck (Rounder, 1992)
- World Turning (Rounder, 1995)
- Glory Shone Around: A Christmas Collection (Rounder, 1995)
- Double Banjo Bluegrass Spectacular (Rounder, 2007)
- Territory (Smithsonian Folkways 2008)
- Great Big World (Rounder, 2014)
- Of A Winter's Night (Independent, 2014)
- The Durban Sessions (Independent, 2019)
- Shall We Hope (Shefa Records, 2021)
- Earl Jam (2024)
- Earl Jam 2 (2026)

=== With Country Cooking ===
- 14 Bluegrass Instrumentals (Rounder Records, 0006, 1971)
- Frank Wakefield With Country Cooking (Rounder Records, 0007, 1972)
- Barrel Of Fun (Rounder Records, 0033, 1974)
- Bluegrass Guitar (Russ Barenberg & Country Cooking, Music Minus One, MMO 185, 1974)

=== With Skyline ===
- Late to Work (Flying Fish, 1981)
- Stranded in the Moonlight (Flying Fish, 1984)
- Skyline Drive (Flying Fish, 1986)
- Fire of Grace (Flying Fish, 1989)

=== With the Big Dogs ===
- Live at the Birchmere (Strictly Country, 1993)

=== With Psychograss ===
- Psychograss (Windham Hill, 1993)
- Like Minds (Sugar Hill, 1996)
- Now Hear This (Adventure Music America, 2005)

=== With the Wayfaring Strangers ===
- Shifting Sands of Time (Rounder, 2001)
- This Train (Rounder, 2003)

== Television appearances ==
- Merv Griffin Show, 1976
- Nashville Network's Fire on the Mountain, 1984, 1986
- Ralph Emery's "Frets" Awards Show, The Nashville Network, 1987
- CBS Hallmark Hall of Fame production of Foxfire with Jessica Tandy, Hume Cronyn and John Denver, 1987
- British television production of Echoes of America: History of the Five String Banjo, 1989
- Where in the World is Carmen Sandiego? (PBS), 1992
- CBS Sunday Morning with Charles Osgood – feature story (including Béla Fleck), 1995
- ABC World News Tonight with Peter Jennings, Summer, 1996
- ABC Views, with Béla Fleck, Summer 1997
- Live at the Quick, with Bela Fleck, 2004–2006
- The Ellen DeGeneres Show, with Steve Martin, Brittany Haas, and Michael Daves, April 2007
- Late Show with David Letterman, with Steve Martin, Bela Fleck, Brittany Haas, and Michael Daves, April 2007
- CBS Television Network's Elton John: I'm Still Standing - A Grammy Salute, with Miley Cyrus, April 2018

== Bibliography ==
- Melodic Banjo, Oak Publications, 1976
- Banjo Song Book, Oak Publications, 1977
- Masters of the 5-String Banjo, Oak Publications, 1988
