= List of awards and nominations received by Steve Martin =

Steve Martin awards and nominations
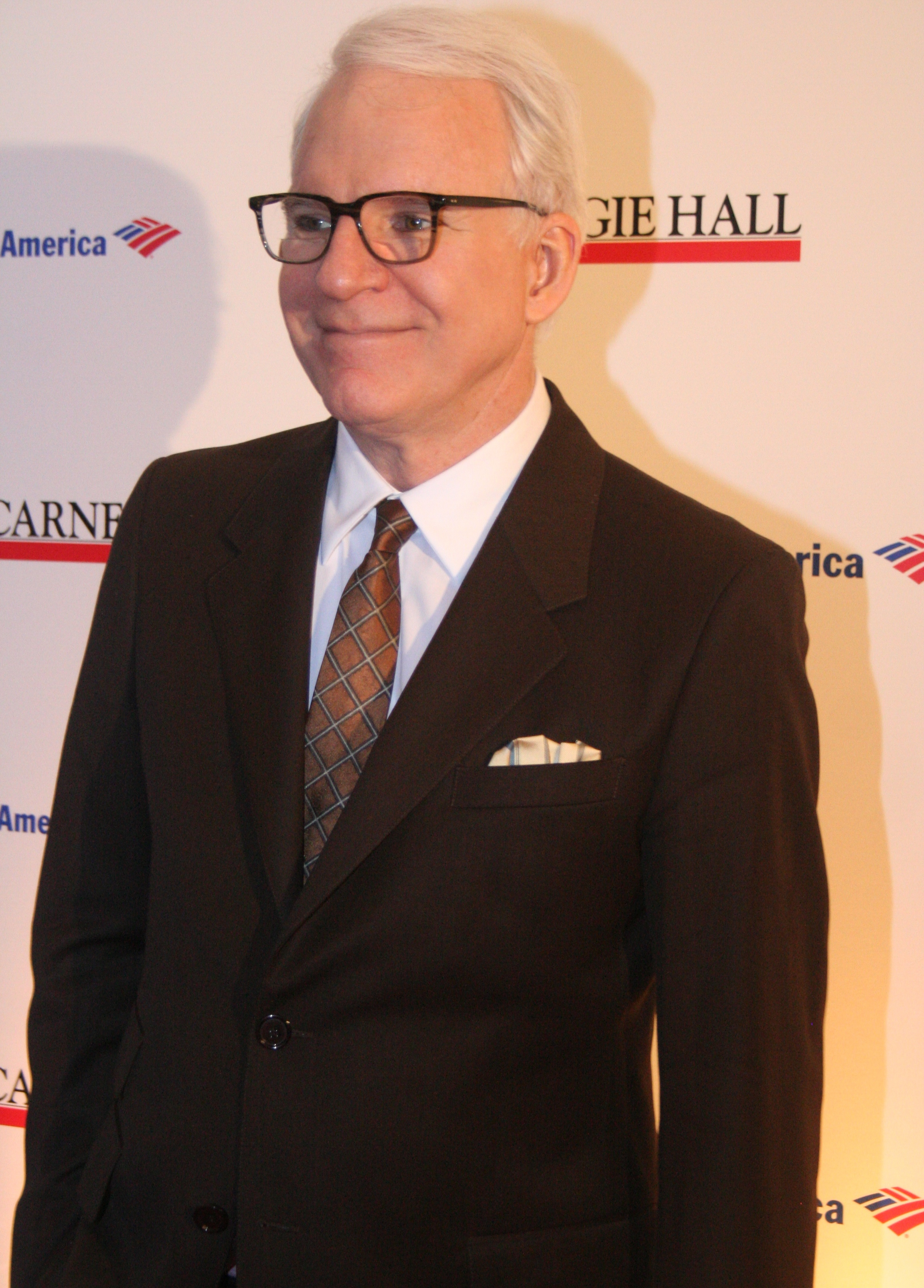
- Martin at the 120th Anniversary of Carnegie Hall, April 2011
Awards and nominations
Award	Wins	Nominations
Academy Awards	1	1
Golden Globe Awards	0	10
Grammy Awards	5	11
Primetime Emmy Awards	1	18
Screen Actors Guild Awards	1	6
Tony Awards	0	2

Totals (Note: Certain award groups do not simply award one winner. They acknowledge several different recipients, have runners-up, and have third place. Since this is a specific recognition and is different from losing an award, runner-up mentions are considered wins in this award tally. For simplification and to avoid errors, each award in this list has been presumed to have had a prior nomination.)
- Wins: 22
- Nominations: 78

The following is a list of awards and nominations received by Steve Martin.

Steve Martin is an American actor, comedian, musician, screenwriter and film producer. He has received several awards including an Academy Award, five Grammy Awards, a Primetime Emmy Award, and a Screen Actors Guild Award, as well as nominations for nine Golden Globe Awards and two Tony Awards.

Martin has received 18 Primetime Emmy Award nominations for his work on television. He won in 1969 for Primetime Emmy Award for Outstanding Writing for a Variety Series for the sketch comedy series The Smothers Brothers Comedy Hour. He has received various accolades including six Golden Globe Award nominations including for his leading film roles in Pennies from Heaven (1981), All of Me (1984), Roxanne (1987), Parenthood (1989), and Father of the Bride Part II (1995). For his work the Hulu mystery-comedy series Only Murders in the Building he was nominated for two Primetime Emmy Awards for Outstanding Lead Actor in a Comedy Series, four Golden Globe Awards for Best Actor – Television Series Musical or Comedy, and two Screen Actors Guild Awards for Outstanding Performance by a Male Actor in a Comedy Series.

He also received five Grammy Awards, two for Best Comedy Album Let's Get Small (1978), and A Wild and Crazy Guy (1979), for Best Country Instrumental Performance for Foggy Mountain Breakdown (2001), Best Bluegrass Album for The Crow: New Songs for the 5-String Banjo (2009), and for Best American Roots Song for Love Has Come for You (2013). He was nominated for two Tony Award for the musical Bright Star (2016).

Over his career he has received several honorary awards including the Mark Twain Prize for American Humor in 2005, the Kennedy Center Honors in 2007, the Academy Honorary Award in 2013, and the AFI Life Achievement Award in 2015.

== Major awards ==
=== Academy Awards ===
Year	Category	Nominated work	Result	Ref.
2014	Honorary Academy Award	—N/a	Honored	

=== Emmy Awards ===
Year	Category	Nominated work	Result	Ref.
Primetime Emmy Awards
1969	Outstanding Writing for a Variety Series	The Smothers Brothers Comedy Hour	Won	
1972	Outstanding Writing for a Variety Series	The Sonny & Cher Comedy Hour	Nominated	
1976	Outstanding Writing for a Variety Series	Van Dyke and Company	Nominated	
2001	Outstanding Performance in a Variety or Music Program	73rd Academy Awards	Nominated	
2009	Outstanding Guest Actor in a Comedy Series	30 Rock	Nominated	
2010	Outstanding Special Class Program	82nd Academy Awards	Nominated	
2010	Outstanding Writing for a Variety Special	82nd Academy Awards	Nominated	
2018	Outstanding Writing for a Variety Special	Steve Martin and Martin Short: An Evening You Will Forget for the Rest of Your Life	Nominated	
2018	Outstanding Original Music and Lyrics (For "The Buddy Song")	Steve Martin and Martin Short: An Evening You Will Forget for the Rest of Your Life	Nominated	
2018	Outstanding Variety Special (Pre-Recorded)	Steve Martin and Martin Short: An Evening You Will Forget for the Rest of Your Life	Nominated	
2022	Outstanding Lead Actor in a Comedy Series	Only Murders in the Building	Nominated	
2022	Outstanding Writing for a Comedy Series (Episode: "True Crime")	Only Murders in the Building	Nominated (Note: Shared with John Hoffman)	
2022	Outstanding Comedy Series (as a producer)	Only Murders in the Building	Nominated	
2023	Outstanding Comedy Series (as a producer)	Only Murders in the Building	Nominated	
2024	Outstanding Comedy Series (as a producer)	Only Murders in the Building	Nominated	
2024	Outstanding Lead Actor in a Comedy Series	Only Murders in the Building	Nominated	
2025	Outstanding Comedy Series (as a producer)	Only Murders in the Building	Nominated	
2026	Outstanding Comedy Series (as a producer)	Only Murders in the Building	Nominated	

=== Golden Globe Awards ===
Year	Category	Nominated work	Result	Ref.
1982	Best Actor in a Motion Picture – Musical or Comedy	Pennies from Heaven	Nominated	
1985	Best Actor in a Motion Picture – Musical or Comedy	All of Me	Nominated	
1988	Best Actor in a Motion Picture – Musical or Comedy	Roxanne	Nominated	
1990	Best Actor in a Motion Picture – Musical or Comedy	Parenthood	Nominated	
1996	Best Actor in a Motion Picture – Musical or Comedy	Father of the Bride Part II	Nominated	
2022	Best Actor – Television Series Musical or Comedy	Only Murders in the Building	Nominated	
2023	Best Actor – Television Series Musical or Comedy	Only Murders in the Building	Nominated	
2024	Best Actor – Television Series Musical or Comedy	Only Murders in the Building	Nominated	
2025	Best Actor – Television Series Musical or Comedy	Only Murders in the Building	Nominated	
2026	Best Actor – Television Series Musical or Comedy	Only Murders in the Building	Nominated	

=== Grammy Awards ===
Year	Category	Nominated work	Result	Ref.
1978	Best Comedy Recording	Let's Get Small	Won	
1979	Best Comedy Recording	A Wild and Crazy Guy	Won	
1980	Best Comedy Recording	Comedy Is Not Pretty!	Nominated	
1983	Best Comedy Recording	The Steve Martin Brothers	Nominated	
1999	Best Spoken Comedy Album	Pure Drivel	Nominated	
2002	Best Country Instrumental Performance	"Foggy Mountain Breakdown"	Won (Note: Shared with Earl Scruggs and others)	
2010	Best Bluegrass Album	The Crow: New Songs for the 5-String Banjo	Won	
2012	Best Bluegrass Album	Rare Bird Alert	Nominated (Note: Shared with Steep Canyon Rangers)	
2014	Best American Roots Song	"Love Has Come for You"	Won (Note: Shared with Edie Brickell)	
2015	Best American Roots Song	”Pretty Little One”	Nominated	
2017	Best Musical Theater Album	Bright Star	Nominated	
2027	Best Bluegrass Album	Safe, Sensible and Sane	Pending (Note: Shared with Alison Brown)	

=== Screen Actors Guild Awards ===
Year	Category	Nominated work	Result	Ref.
2022	Outstanding Male Actor in a Comedy Series	Only Murders in the Building	Nominated	
2022	Outstanding Ensemble in a Comedy Series	Only Murders in the Building	Nominated	
2023	Outstanding Male Actor in a Comedy Series	Only Murders in the Building	Nominated	
2023	Outstanding Ensemble in a Comedy Series	Only Murders in the Building	Nominated	
2024	Outstanding Ensemble in a Comedy Series	Only Murders in the Building	Nominated	
2025	Outstanding Ensemble in a Comedy Series	Only Murders in the Building	Won	

=== Tony Awards ===
Year	Category	Nominated work	Result	Ref.
2016	Best Book of a Musical	Bright Star	Nominated	
2016	Best Original Score	Bright Star	Nominated	

== Miscellaneous awards ==
Organizations	Year	Category	Work	Result	Ref.
American Comedy Awards	1987	Funniest Actor in a Motion Picture (Leading Role)	Little Shop of Horrors	Nominated	
American Comedy Awards	1988	Funniest Actor in a Motion Picture (Leading Role)	Roxanne	Nominated	
American Comedy Awards	1990	Funniest Actor in a Motion Picture (Leading Role)	Parenthood	Nominated	
American Comedy Awards	1996	Funniest Actor in a Motion Picture (Leading Role)	Father of the Bride Part II	Nominated	
American Comedy Awards	1999	Funniest Male Guest Appearance in a TV Series	Late Show with David Letterman	Nominated	
American Comedy Awards	2000	Lifetime Achievement Award in Comedy	—N/a	Won	
Boston Film Festival	2001	Film Excellence Award	—N/a	Won	
Critics' Choice Documentary Awards	2024	Best Narration	Steve! (Martin) A Documentary in 2 Pieces	Won	
Critics' Choice Television Awards	2022	Best Actor in a Comedy Series	Only Murders in the Building	Nominated	
Critics' Choice Television Awards	2023	Best Actor in a Comedy Series	Only Murders in the Building	Nominated	
Critics' Choice Television Awards	2024	Best Actor in a Comedy Series	Only Murders in the Building	Nominated	
Drama Desk Awards	2016	Outstanding Music	Bright Star	Won	
Hollywood Critics Association	2022	Best Actor in a Streaming Series, Comedy	Only Murders in the Building	Nominated	
Hollywood Critics Association	2023	Best Actor in a Streaming Series, Comedy	Only Murders in the Building	Nominated	
Hollywood Critics Association	2023	Best Guest Actor in a Comedy Series (Note: Shared with Martin Short)	Saturday Night Live	Nominated	
Hasty Pudding Theatricals	1988	Man of the Year	—N/a	Won	
Los Angeles Film Critics Association	1987	Best Actor	Roxanne	Won	
National Board of Review	2009	Best Cast (Note: Shared with cast)	It's Complicated	Won	
National Society of Film Critics	1984	Best Actor	All of Me	Won	
National Society of Film Critics	1987	Best Actor	Roxanne	Won	
New York Film Critics Circle	1984	Best Actor	All of Me	Won	
MTV Movie & TV Awards	1992	Best Comedic Performance	Father of the Bride	Nominated	
MTV Movie & TV Awards	2004	Best Dance Sequence	Bringing Down the House	Nominated	
MTV Movie & TV Awards	2022	Best Team (Note: Shared with Selena Gomez and Martin Short)	Only Murders in the Building	Nominated	
Outer Critics Circle Award	2016	Outstanding Book of a Musical	Bright Star	Nominated	
Outer Critics Circle Award	2016	Outstanding New Score	Bright Star	Nominated	
People's Choice Awards	1992	Favorite Actor in a Comedy Motion Picture	L.A. Story	Won	
People's Choice Awards	1993	Favorite Actor in a Comedy Motion Picture	Housesitter	Won	
People's Choice Awards	2021	The Comedy TV star of 2021	Only Murders in the Building	Nominated	
Teen Choice Awards	2000	Film – Choice Liar	Bowfinger	Nominated	
Teen Choice Awards	2003	Choice Movie Hissy Fit	Bringing Down the House	Nominated	
US Comedy Arts Festival	1998	Grand Jury Award – Comedy (Performance)	—N/a	Won	
Writers Guild of America Awards	1981	Variety, Musical or Comedy	All Commercials... A Steve Martin Special	Won	
Writers Guild of America Awards	1988	Best Adapted Screenplay	Roxanne	Won	

== Honorary awards ==
Organizations	Year	Award	Result	Ref.
California State University Long Beach	1989	Honorary Doctor of Humane Letters degree	Honored	
Mark Twain Prize for American Humor	2005	Statue	Honored	
Disney Legend Award	2005	Statue	Honored	
Kennedy Center Honors	2007	Medal	Honored	
International Bluegrass Music Association	2011	Entertainer of the Year	Honored	
Academy of Motion Picture Arts and Sciences	2013	Academy Honorary Award	Honored	
American Film Institute	2015	AFI Life Achievement Award	Honored	

== See also ==
- Steve Martin filmography
