= Brandon Bell (recording engineer) =

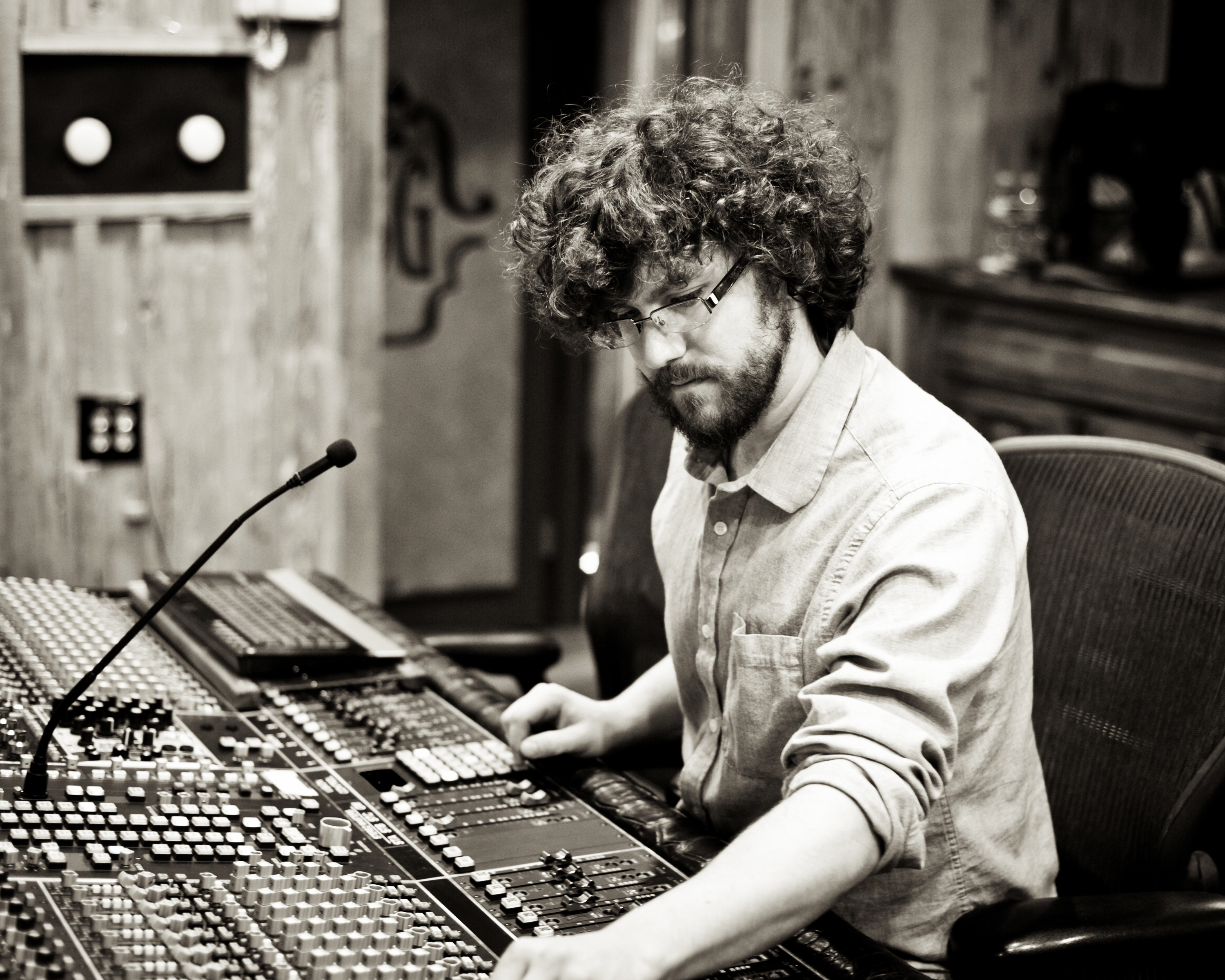

Background information
- Origin: Heber Springs, Arkansas, U.S.
- Genres: Bluegrass, Country, Americana, Rock, and Folk
- Occupations: Engineer, Mix Engineer, Producer
- Years active: 2005 - present
- Website: mixerbell.com

Brandon Bell is an American Grammy Award winning recording engineer, mix engineer and producer based in Nashville. His credits include Brandi Carlile, Alan Jackson, Sarah Jarosz, Joni Mitchell, Steep Canyon Rangers, Zac Brown Band, Janis Ian, The Highwomen, Foo Fighters, Tanya Tucker, Parker McCollum, Earl Scruggs, Reba McEntire, Alison Krauss and Union Station, Brandy Clark, Billy Strings, Dierks Bentley, Miranda Lambert, Allison Russell, and Blackberry Smoke.

Bell graduated from Middle Tennessee State University in 2004. In 2014, he was hired as the studio director and chief engineer at Southern Ground Nashville, owned by recording artist, Zac Brown from the Zac Brown Band. Since 2020, Bell has been working independently.

He has been featured as a special guest on music industry podcasts: Recording Studio Rock Stars and Surviving The Music Industry with Brandon Harrington.

Bell is a member of The Recording Academy and sits on a committee of the Audio Engineering Society.

== Education ==
Bell graduated from Heber Springs High School in Heber Springs, Arkansas. He earned a Bachelor of Science in Recording Industry degree at Middle Tennessee State University. MTSU honored Bell in 2023 for his achievements in the recording industry.

== Selected discography ==
Year	Album	Artist	Credit
2006	Like Red on a Rose	Alan Jackson	Engineer
2008	The Ultimate Collection: Live at the Ryman	Earl Scruggs	Engineer
2010	Up On The Ridge	Dierks Bentley	Engineer, mixing assistant
2011	Daybreak	Sierra Hull	Engineer, mixing, editing
2011	Rare Bird Alert	Steve Martin & The Steep Canyon Rangers	Engineer
2011	Follow Me Down	Sarah Jarosz	Engineer
2012	Home	Dierks Bentley	Assistant, engineer
2012	Nobody Knows You	The Steep Canyon Rangers	Engineer, mixing
2014	Sonic Highways	Foo Fighters	Studio Assistant
2017	Welcome Home	Zac Brown / Zac Brown Band	Engineer, mixing
2019	Ridin' High....Again	Jack Ingram	Engineer, mixing
2019	The Highwomen	The Highwomen	Engineer
2020	Hollywood Gold	Parker McCollum	Engineer
2020	Now I Don't Know	Adam Chaffins	Engineer, producer
2021	The Marfa Tapes	Miranda Lambert, Jack Ingram and Jon Randall	Engineer
2023	In These Silent Days	Brandi Carlile	Engineer

== Awards ==
Bell has received two nominations for Grammy Award for Best Engineered Album, Non-Classical with Gary Paczosa. The first in 2006 for Alan Jackson's Like Red on a Rose (which is also Gold Certified by RIAA) and the second in 2011 for Sarah Jarosz's Follow Me Down.

He won the Grammy Award for Best Bluegrass Album in 2013 for his work on Steep Canyon Rangers’ album Nobody Knows You and again in 2025 for Live Vol. 1 by Billy Strings.

He engineered Brandi Carlile's lead single Right on Time, from the Album In These Silent Days. The single received Grammy nominations for Record of the Year, Song of the Year, and Best Pop Solo Performance in 2022.

Bell was nominated for Audio Engineer of The Year for the 2022 ACM Awards. He also engineered The Marfa Tapes which was nominated for Best Country Album at the 64th Annual Grammy Awards.

In 2023, Bell won the Grammy Award for Best Americana Album for his work as an engineer on Brandi Carlile's album In These Silent Days. The album also received the Grammy nomination for Album of the Year. Carlile's single "Broken Horses" won Best Rock Performance and Best Rock Song at the 65th Annual Grammy Awards. "You and Me on the Rock" was nominated for Record of the Year, Best Americana Performance, and Best American Roots Song.

In 2024, Bell won a Grammy Award for Best Folk Album for his work on Joni Mitchell's album At Newport. Allison Rusell's album The Returner and Brandy Clark's album Brandy Clark were each nominated for Best Americana Album. He contributed additional engineering to Billy Strings' album Me/And/Dad, which was nominated for Best Bluegrass Album.

Year	Award	Recipient/Artist/Work	Award	Result
2025	Grammy Awards	Billy Strings - Live Vol. 1	Best Bluegrass Album	Won
2024	JUNO Awards	Wiliam Prince - Stand in the Joy	Contemporary Roots Album of the Year	Won
2024	Grammy Awards	Joni Mitchell - At Newport	Best Folk Album	Won
2024	UK Americana Music Awards	Allison Russell - The Returner	International Album of the Year	Won
2024	Grammy Awards	Allison Russell - The Returner	Best Americana Album	Nomination
2024	Americana Music Awards	Brandy Clark - Brandy Clark	Album of the Year	Nomination
2024	Grammy Awards	Brandy Clark - Brandy Clark	Best Americana Album	Nomination
2023	Grammy Awards	Janis Ian - The Light At The End Of The Line	Best Folk Album	Nomination
2023	Grammy Awards	Brandi Carlile - “You And Me On The Rock”	Record of the Year	Nomination
2023	Grammy Awards	Brandi Carlile “In These Silent Days”	Album of the Year	Nomination
2023	Grammy Awards	Brandi Carlile - In These Silent Days	Best Americana Album	Won
2022	Americana Music Awards	Brandi Carlile - In These Silent Days	Album of the Year	Nomination
2022	Grammy Awards	Miranda Lambert - Marfa Tapes	Best Country Album	Nomination
2022	Grammy Awards	Brandi Carlile - "Right On Time"	Record of the Year	Nomination
2021	ACM Awards	Brandon Bell	Audio Engineer of the Year	Nomination
2020	UK Americana Music Awards	The Highwomen - "The Highwomen"	International Album of the Year	Won
2020	Americana Music Awards	The Highwomen - "The Highwomen"	Album of the Year	Won
2019	Grammy Awards	the Wood Brothers - One Drop of Truth	Best Americana Album	Nomination
2019	Grammy Awards	Mike Barnett - Portraits In Fiddles	Best Bluegrass Album	Nomination
2014	Grammy Awards	Sarah Jarosz - Build Me Up From Bones	Best Folk Album	Nomination
2014	Americana Music Awards	Sarah Jarosz - Build Me Up From Bones	Album of the Year	Nomination
2013	Grammy Awards	Steep Canyon Rangers - Nobody Knows You	Best Bluegrass Album	Won
2012	Grammy Awards	Steve Martin - Rare Bird Alert	Best Bluegrass Album	Nomination
2011	Grammy Awards	Sarah Jarosz - Follow Me Down	Best Engineered Album, Non-Classical	Nomination
2011	Academy of Country Music Awards	Dierks Bentley - Up On The Ridge	Album of the Year	Nomination
2010	Country Music Association Awards	Dierks Bentley - Up On The Ridge	Album of the Year	Nomination
2010	Grammy Awards	Dierks Bentley - Up On The Ridge	Best Country Album	Nomination
2008	Grammy Awards	Earl Scruggs - The Ultimate Collection: Live at the Ryman	Best Bluegrass Album	Nomination
2007	Grammy Awards	Alan Jackson - Like Red On A Rose	Best Country Album	Nomination
2007	Grammy Awards	Alan Jackson - Like Red on a Rose	Best Engineered Album, Non-Classical	Nomination

Years reflect the year in which the Awards were presented, for works released in the previous year.
