= Be Still Moses =

Studio album by Steep Canyon Rangers
- Released: March 6, 2020
- Studio: Echo Mountain Recordings
- Genres: Americana, Bluegrass, Country
- Length: 48:01
- Label: Yep Roc
- Producer: Michael Selverne

Steep Canyon Rangers chronology
North Carolina Songbook (2019)	Be Still Moses (2020)	Arm in Arm (2020)

Be Still Moses is the 12th studio album by American bluegrass band Steep Canyon Rangers. The North Carolina label, Yep Roc Records, released the album digitally on March 6, 2020, then on CD and LP on April 10, 2020. The album was made in collaboration with the Asheville Symphony. The album's title track, "Be Still Moses," features the Philadelphia R&B/Soul group Boyz II Men. Be Still Moses reached #1 on Billboard's Bluegrass Chart, #2 on the Classical Crossover Chart, and #8 on the Americana/Folk Chart.

== Background and recording ==
Be Still Moses is a compilation of re-recordings and re-imaginings of some of Steep Canyon Rangers' most popular songs. The idea for Be Still Moses began as a conversation between Asheville music producer, Michael Selverne, Jessica Tomasin of Echo Mountain Recordings, and David Whitehill, the executive producer of the Asheville Symphony. The three wanted to celebrate Asheville's diverse music community, while breaking down the barrier between the orchestra and Asheville's roots-music scene. In 2015, the three identified local bands to make a compilation album, and among these bands was Steep Canyon Rangers.

While working on a project for Shannon Whitworth, wife of Steep Canyon Rangers' Woody Platt, Selverne got to know Platt, Mike Ashworth, and Barrett Smith. According to Selverne, "All together I had become a huge fan of the Rangers as humans and friends and then I became a huge fan of their work. Usually, it’s the other way around."

After becoming friends, Selverne decided to approach Steep Canyon Rangers to make an album in collaboration with the Asheville Symphony Orchestra. In 2016, he approached the band at Mountain Song Festival in Brevard, North Carolina. The two groups made the deal the following summer.

On January 8, 2018, the first day of tracking began at Echo Mountain Recordings in Asheville. After a day of successfully recording three tracks, Michael Selverne was taken to the hospital having suffered a grand mal seizure. Selverne's recovery delayed the recording process another 9 months. The Boyz II Men vocal tracks for "Be Still Moses" were recorded separately.

The single, "Be Still Moses," was released on August 27, 2019 as a precursor to the album. On October 6, 2019, Steep Canyon Rangers joined Boyz II Men for a live performance of "Be Still Moses" at Nashville's Schermerhorn Symphony Center. The performance was backed by 12 members of the Asheville Symphony Orchestra and guest conductor Michael Bearden.

== Critical reception ==
Professional ratings
Review scores
Source	Rating
PopMatters	7/10 stars
Americana UK	6/10 stars

On March 6, 2020 PopMatters' Rich Wilhelm said, "Be Still Moses, the new album by Steep Canyon Rangers and the Asheville Symphony, is a unique example of a band moving forward with a creative challenge, even as they look back on their collected body of work." The album was given a 7 out of 10 score.

Paul Kerr, writer for Americana UK, began his review of Be Still Moses with, "‘Be Still Moses’ is a bit of a curate’s egg, partly bad, partly good, although, to be fair, none of it is really bad, just slightly over-egged." Kerr gave Be Still Moses a 6 out of 10 score.

Rolling Stone's Jon Freeman says of Be Still Moses that, "Steep Canyon Rangers find an unlikely, but welcome, group of collaborators in the hit Nineties R&B group Boyz II Men, who add their voices to a newly released version of “Be Still Moses.” The gospel tune, originally recorded by Steep Canyon Rangers and released on the 2007 album Lovin’ Pretty Women, is the first for SCR under a new agreement with Yep Roc records."

Gary Graff began his article for Billboard with, "Steep Canyon Rangers and Boyz II Men might seem like strange musical bedfellows on paper, but they work well together on a remake of SCR's 'Be Still Moses.' The song, which premieres exclusively on Billboard below today (Aug. 27), is featured on the bluegrass band's upcoming orchestral album."

Chris Parton begins his article for Sounds Like Nashville with, "It’s fairly common to hear country mixed with R&B nowadays, but how about bluegrass and R&B … plus an orchestral symphony? That’s the fascinating idea behind the Steep Canyon Rangers new collaboration with Boyz II Men — and the Asheville Symphony — on “Be Still Moses.”

== Track listing ==
No.	Title	Writer(s)	Length
1.	"Easy to Love"	Graham Sharp	5:42
2.	"Radio"	Graham Sharp	3:50
3.	"Be Still Moses feat. Boyz II Men and Asheville Symphony"	Graham Sharp	3:06
4.	"Call the Captain"	Graham Sharp	5:44
5.	"Let Me Out of This Town"	Philip Barker, Charles Humphrey	3:44
6.	"Blow Me Away"	Graham Sharp	4:35
7.	"Between Midnight and the Dawn"	Graham Sharp, John Sherrill	4:37
8.	"Las Vegas"	Graham Sharp	4:21
9.	"Farmers and Pharaohs"	Graham Sharp, Sarah Siskind	4:07
10.	"The Mountain's Gonna Sing"	Graham Sharp	3:50
11.	"Auden's Train"	Steve Martin, Nicky Sanders	5:23
Total length:			48:01

== Personnel ==
Adapted from the album's liner notes.
Steep Canyon Rangers

- Michael Ashworth - vocals, percussion, guitar, mandolin
- Michael Guggino - vocals, mandolin, mandola
- Woody Platt - vocals, guitar
- Nicky Sanders - fiddle, piano, vocals
- Graham Sharp - vocals, banjo, guitar, harmonica
- Barrett Smith - bass

Asheville Symphony Orchestra Musicians
Violin	Viola	Cello	Bass	Flute	Oboe	Clarinet	Bassoon	Horn	Trumpet	Trombone	Tuba	Timpani	Percussion
Jason Posnock, Concertmaster	Kara F. Poorbaugh, Principal	J. Franklin Keel IV, Acting Principal	Lee Morris Metcalfe, Principal	Lissie J. Shanahan, Principal	Alicia Chapman, Principal	Harry "Chip" Hill, Principal	Michael J. Burns, Principal	Jeffrey B. Whaley, Principal	T. Mark Clodfelter, Principal	James Sparrow, Principal	Bethany Wiese, Principal	Todd D. Mueller, Principal	Mario A. Gaetano, Principal
Mariya Potapova, Acting Associate Concertmaster	Regina Mashburn Heath	Kathleen Foster		Leonard Lopatin	Cara Mia Jenkins	Karen Farah Hill	Amber F. Spuller	Michael L. Brubaker	Brian J. Garland	Michael Hosford			
Kathryn B. Gardner, Principal Second Violin	Jason McCoy	Paul S. Ghosthorse		Dilshad B. Posnock				Travis A. Bennett		Fletcher Peacock			
Debra L. Anthony, Associate Principal Second Violin													
Teresa M. Curran													
Lori G. Hammel													
Dorothy L. Knowles													
Ginger Kowal													
Inez Hullinger Redman													
Paul E. Stroebel													

- David Whitehill is the Executive Producer for the Asheville Symphony Orchestra
- Darko Butorac is the Music Director for the Asheville Symphony Orchestra
- Maestro Michael Bearden acted as guest conductor for these recordings.

Boyz II Men

- Nathan Morris - Baritone
- Wanya Morris - Tenor
- Shawn Stockman - Tenor

Production All tracks produced by Michael Selverne for Welcome to Mars. "Be Still Moses" produced by Michael Selverne, Wanya Morris, Nathan Morris, Shawn Stockman and Joe Mulvihill.

- Vocal arrangement on "Be Still Moses" by Boyz II Men, Michael Selverne and Joe Mulvihill
- Mixed by Julian Dreyer and Michael Selverne
  - Assisted by Kenny Harrington
- Engineered by Julian Dryer
  - Assistant Engineers: Kenny Harrington and Dowell Gandy

Recorded and Mixed at Echo Mountain Recording, Asheville, NC.

- All tracks arranged and orchestrated by Jonathan Sacks
  - "Be Still Moses" arranged by Michael Bearden, Orchestrated by Pat Russ, Copyist Julie Eidsvog
- Mastered by Eric Boulanger at The Bakery, L.A.
- Cover artwork by Mark Wilson
- Album design by Nathan Golub
