= North Carolina Songbook =

Live album by Steep Canyon Rangers
- Released: November 29, 2019
- Recorded: April 28, 2019
- Venue: Merlefest 2019
- Genre: Americana, Bluegrass, Country
- Length: 33:58
- Label: Yep Roc
- Producer: Steep Canyon Rangers

Steep Canyon Rangers chronology
Out in the Open (2018)	North Carolina Songbook (2019)	Be Still Moses (2020)

North Carolina Songbook is the 11th album from American bluegrass band Steep Canyon Rangers. The album was released on Yep Roc Records on November 29, 2019, for Record Store Day/Black Friday. The digital and wide releases for North Carolina Songbook came on April 10, 2020. album debuted at #1 on the Billboard Bluegrass Albums Chart. It also reached #9 on the Americana/Folk Albums chart, #22 on the Current Country Albums chart, #29 on the Record Label Independent Albums chart, and #119 on the Top Current Albums chart. North Carolina Songbook was nominated for the Grammy Award for Best Bluegrass Album in March 2021.

== Background and recording ==
North Carolina Songbook features eight songs that span the history of North Carolina's music, including songs from Elizabeth Cotten, Doc Watson, Ben E. King, James Taylor, Tommy Jerrell, Ola Belle Reed, and Thelonious Monk.

The album was recorded live at the 2019 Merlefest music festival at Wilkes Community College in Wilkesboro, NC. The setlist was performed on April 28, 2019, and was introduced by North Carolina's governor, Roy Cooper. Mike Guggino, mandolin player for the Steep Canyon Rangers, was interviewed by The Bluegrass Situation on December 3, 2019. Guggino said, "We all tried to come to the table with songs that we thought might work for the set. We knew we needed not only good songs, but also songs that worked well together to make the set flow. We needed the set to have some diversity, some highs and lows dynamically. We also wanted to feature different members of the band throughout the show."

== Critical reception ==
Professional ratings
Review scores
Source	Rating
American Songwriter	3.5/5 stars
Americana UK	7/10 stars

North Carolina Songbook was given 3.5 out of 5 stars by American Songwriter. Jason Scott said, "A long and storied career, stretched across more than 10 records, including several Steve Martin collaborations, Steep Canyon Rangers have become a staple at the annual MerleFest, a roots performance set in Wilkesboro."

The album was given a 7 out of 10 score by Americana UK on December 17, 2019. Helen Jones ended her article with, "Although not a whole lot was done to reinvent the songs covered on this live record, it's still a pleasure to hear them dusted off and presented anew; maybe even making some new fans of the original artists behind them along the way."

Lee Zimmerman of Bluegrass Today, reviewed the album on December 2, 2019. Zimmerman began his article with, "It goes without saying that the Steep Canyon Rangers are in the forefront of those artists who have helped in the transition from bluegrass to grassicana, sharing their reverence for their roots while establishing their own contemporary credence."

Kevin Bryan of OriginalRock.net, began his article with, "Steep Canyon Rangers, North Carolina Songbook (Yep Roc)- Steep Canyon Rangers have become a regular fixture at Merlefest, the North Carolina roots music festival over the years, and their latest appearance at the prestigious event found this eclectic bluegrass outfit paying homage to some of the state’s musical icons via a quite extraordinary live set."

North Carolina Songbook was nominated for Best Bluegrass Album at the 63rd Grammy Awards, although they did not win the award.

== Track listing ==
No.	Title	Writer(s)	Length
1.	"Stand by Me"	Ben E. King, Jerry Leiber, Mike Stoller	4:30
2.	"Don't Let Your Deal Go Down"	Earl Scruggs, Charlie Poole	3:16
3.	"Blue Monk"	Thelonious Monk	4:34
4.	"Drunkard's Hiccups"	Tommy Jerrell	3:21
5.	"Shake Sugaree"	Elizabeth Cotten	4:00
6.	"Sweet Baby James"	James Taylor	4:05
7.	"I've Endured"	David Arthur Reed, Ola Belle Reed	6:05
8.	"Your Lone Journey"	Doc Watson, Rosa Lee Watson	4:07
Total length:			33:58

== Personnel ==
North Carolina Songbook was produced by Steep Canyon Rangers.

- Woody Platt - guitar, vocals
- Graham Sharp - banjo, vocals
- Mike Guggino - mandolin/mandola, vocals
- Nicky Sanders - fiddle, vocals
- Mike Ashworth - drums, vocals
- Barrett Smith - bass, vocals

North Carolina Songbook was mastered by Dave Harris at Studio B Mastering in Charlotte, North Carolina.
