= Radio (Steep Canyon Rangers album) =

Studio album by Steep Canyon Rangers
- Released: August 28, 2015
- Studios: Echo Mountain Recording; The Squirrel Nest
- Genre: Bluegrass
- Length: 43:45
- Label: Rounder Records
- Producer: Jerry Douglas

Steep Canyon Rangers chronology
Tell the Ones I Love (2013)	Radio (2015)	Out in the Open (2018)

Professional ratings
Review scores
Source	Rating
AllMusic	4/5 stars
American Songwriter	3.5/5 stars

Radio is the ninth solo album by Steep Canyon Rangers, their eleventh overall. It was released on August 28, 2015. The album peaked at No. 1 on the Billboard Bluegrass Albums chart on 18 September 2015 and spent a total of 41 weeks on that chart. The title song was nominated for Song of the Year by the International Bluegrass Music Association in 2016.

== Critical reception ==
Mark Deming of AllMusic begins his review with, "The Steep Canyon Rangers have spent much of their career walking a fine line between traditional bluegrass and acoustic music with a strong contemporary pop and country influence, and they've blurred the lines between the two sides of their musical personality more than ever before on 2015's Radio."

Hal Horowitz concludes his review for American Songwriter with, "The Rangers' vocal harmonies feel lived in and natural, adding more down home goodness that springs from these players with an easygoing charm. Ditto for the music that finds the Rangers coalescing in ways only acquired through over a decade and a half of playing live. The Martin connection was icing on the cake for an outfit that, based on albums as strong as Radio, was primed and ready for their unsuspecting thrust into the spotlight."

In Donald Teplyske's review for Country Standard Time, he concluded with, "Steep Canyon Rangers continue to be one of the most lively acoustic bands working, recording well-written, thoughtful original songs that go to unexpected places; there are few bands like them. Unless "Radio" is a 'one-off,' however, it's not sure we can still call them bluegrass."

== Track listing ==
All tracks are written by Graham Sharp, unless otherwise noted.

No.	Title	Writer(s)	Length
1.	"Radio"		3:24
2.	"Diamonds In The Dust"	Phil Barker; Charles Humphrey III	3:10
3.	"Simple Is Me"		3:22
4.	"Blow Me Away"		4:39
5.	"Blue Velvet Rain"	Phil Barker; Charles Humphrey III	3:58
6.	"Looking Glass"	Mike Guggino	2:48
7.	"Down That Road Again"		4:44
8.	"Break"	Woody Platt; Shannon Whitworth	3:01
9.	"Wasted"		4:08
10.	"Long Summer"		3:42
11.	"When The Well Runs Dry"	Jonathan Byrd; Charles Humphrey III	3:17
12.	"Monumental Fool"		3:32
Total length:			43:45

== Musicians ==
- Graham Sharp – Banjo, Vocals, Harmonica
- Charles R. Humphrey III – Bass
- Mike Ashworth – Drums, Guitar, Vocals
- Nicky Sanders – Fiddle, Vocals
- Woody Platt – Guitar, Vocals
- Mike Guggino – Mandolin, Vocals
- Jerry Douglas – Guitar, Dobro, Resonator Guitar [National], Lap Steel Guitar
- Shannon Whitworth – Duet Vocals on "Down That Road Again"

== Production ==
- Package Design – Jimmy Hole
- Assistant Engineer – Clay Miller
- Mastered By – Paul Blakemore
- Mixed By – Julian Dreyer
- Photography By – Sandlin Gaither
- Photography By (Live) – Shelly Swanger
- Producer – Jerry Douglas
- Recorded By – Julian Dreyer
- Additional Recording By – Ryan Carr

Track information and credits verified from the album's liner notes. Some information was adapted from Discogs and AllMusic.
