= Rapidgrass =

American bluegrass band

- Origin: Golden, Colorado, USA
- Genres: Bluegrass, Folk, Gypsy Jazz, Progressive Bluegrass, Jam band
- Years active: 2012–present
- Members: Mark Morris, Jon Wirtz, Charles Mertens, Alex Johnstone, Andy Reiner
- Past members: Kyle Hauser, Nick Amodeo, Paul Waitines, Billy Cardine, Justin Konrad, Coleman Smith.
- Website: www.rapidgrass.com

Rapidgrass is an American bluegrass band founded in Golden, Colorado in 2012. Although they are widely considered a bluegrass band, their genre of music can best be described as "rapidgrass" due to its furious pace and its wide range of influences including gypsy jazz, bluegrass, swing and classical music. The lineup includes Mark Morris (guitar, vocals), Jon Wirtz (piano, organ), Charles Mertens (upright bass, tenor banjo, vocals), Alex Johnstone (mandolin, fiddle, vocals), Andy Reiner (violin),.

The band released their first CD, Rapidgrass Quintet in 2013 and was voted as one of the top 5 albums by the Mountain Arts Culture Colorado. In the summer of 2015, the band were winners of the RockyGrass Band Competition, earning them a spot on the main stage of the 2016 festival. Previous winners of the Rockygrass Contest include Mark O'Connor, Tim O'Brien, Steep Canyon Rangers and The Railsplitters. Rapidgrass embarked on a world tour in 2016, most notably headlining the La Roche Bluegrass Festival in France.

Soon thereafter they released their second studio album, Crooked Road'. In June 2017, the band released its third studio album Happy Trails at the 8th annual Rapidgrass Music Festival in Idaho Springs, CO. In 2018, Rapidgrass was recognized as the "Best Bluegrass Band in Denver" by 303 Magazine. In 2020, Rapidgrass announced the release of their 5th album, 'Take Him River' In 2025 Rapidgrass released their 6th studio album, ‘Valhalla’ at their 16th annual Bluegrass festival.

== Discography ==
=== Albums ===
Title	Album details	Peak chart positions		
Title	Album details	US Grass	US	US Indie
Rapidgrass Quintet	Release date: 2013; Label: Self-Released	—	—	—
Crooked Road	Release date: 2015; Label: Self-Released	—	—	—
Happy Trails	Release date: 2017; Label: Self-Released	—	—	—
Take Him River	Release date: 2020; Label: Self-Released	—	—	—

=== Music videos ===
Year	Video	Director
2015	"Crooked Road"	Sean Morris
2017	"I-70"	Gabriel Rovick
2017	"Happy Trails"	Gabriel Rovick
