= Jeff Blumenkrantz =

American actor and composer (born 1965)

Jeff Blumenkrantz (born June 3, 1965) is an American actor, composer and lyricist.

Born in Long Branch, New Jersey, Blumenkrantz is a graduate of Northwestern University School of Communication. His stage credits include roles in the Broadway productions Into the Woods (1987), The Threepenny Opera (1989), Damn Yankees (1994), How to Succeed in Business Without Really Trying (1995), A Class Act (2001), and Bright Star (2016), and Off Broadway in Murder for Two, the City Center Encores productions of Anyone Can Whistle, God Bless You, Mr. Rosewater, and The Golden Apple, and the New York Philharmonic productions of Candide (as Maximillian) and Sweeney Todd (as The Beadle), both filmed for PBS. He has also appeared in such television shows as Succession (TV series), Pose (TV series), Mr. Robot, The Blacklist (TV series), Fosse/Verdon, The Detour, Will & Grace, 30 Rock, The Good Wife, Ugly Betty, Just Shoot Me!, and Law & Order, and the films The Big Sick and Joseph and the Amazing Technicolor Dreamcoat.

In 2000, noted Broadway actress and recording artist Audra McDonald included Blumenkrantz's song "I Won't Mind" on her CD, How Glory Goes. This lullaby (with lyrics by Annie Kessler and Libby Saines) has become a staple of McDonald's repertoire. Blumenkrantz also contributed a piece to The Seven Deadly Sins, a song cycle commissioned by Carnegie Hall for the singer. His comic song, "My Book," addressed the sin of sloth.

In 2003, Blumenkrantz was nominated for a Best Original Score Tony Award for his work on Urban Cowboy, a nomination he shared with Jason Robert Brown and others. He wrote the book, music, and lyrics for Scaffolding as part of the 2018 Inner Voices series. Scaffolding was directed by Victoria Clark and starred Rebecca Luker. His song "Ovid" was featured in the Prospect Theatre Company's production of Notes from Now at 59E59 Theaters.

In 2005–2006, Blumenkrantz created and hosted The Jeff Blumenkrantz Songbook Podcast, a weekly podcast featuring the songs from his songbook, occasional additional episodes of which were released until at least February 2010. This project was succeeded in 2008 by the BMI Workshop Songbook Podcast, which Blumenkrantz hosted, showcasing the eponymous songbook, which features the work of members of the BMI Songwriters' Workshop.

Blumenkrantz is the recipient of the 2011 Fred Ebb Award for excellence in musical theatre songwriting.

== Theatre credits ==
Year	Title	Role	Notes
1986	Joseph and the Amazing Technicolor Dreamcoat	Zebulun/Baker	
1987	South Pacific	Professor	New York City Opera
1987-89	Into the Woods	u/s Jack, The Steward, Rapunzel’s Prince	Broadway
1987-89	Into the Woods	Jack	Broadway Replacement
1989	My Fair Lady	Freddy Eynsford-Hill	Benedum Center
1989	Grease	Eugene Florczyk	Benedum Center
1989	Threepenny Opera	Filch	Broadway
1990	A Funny Thing Happened on the Way to the Forum	Hero	
1992	Joseph and the Amazing Technicolor Dreamcoat	Simeon	North America Tour (Also played the role in the film)
1994-95	Damn Yankees	Smokey	Broadway
1995-96	How to Succeed in Business Without Really Trying	Bud Frump	Broadway
1997	Into the Woods	The Steward	10th Anniversary Concert
2001	A Class Act	Charley/Marvin Hamlisch	Broadway
2004	Candide	Maximilian	Concert
2010	Anyone Can Whistle	Treasurer Cooley	Encores!
2013-14	Murder for Two	All Suspects	
2014	Sweeney Todd: The Demon Barber of Fleet Street	Beadle Bamford	Concert
2015-16	Bright Star	Daryl Ames	Kennedy Center & Broadway
2016	God Bless You, Mr. Rosewater	Thurmond McAllister	Encores!
2017	The Golden Apple	Menelaus / Scylla	Encores!
2017-18	Bright Star	Daryl Ames	US Tour
2019	The Underpants	Klinglehoff	
2022	The Drowsy Chaperone	Underling	
2023	Hercules	Panic	Paper Mill Playhouse

== Video games ==
Year	Title	Role	Notes
2026	Grand Theft Auto VI	The Local Population	
