= Arm in Arm =

Studio album by Steep Canyon Rangers
- Released: October 16, 2020
- Studio: Southern Ground Nashville
- Genres: Americana, Bluegrass, Country
- Label: Yep Roc Records

Steep Canyon Rangers chronology
Be Still Moses (2020)	Arm in Arm (2020)

Arm in Arm is the 13th studio album by American bluegrass band Steep Canyon Rangers. It was released on October 16, 2020, through Yep Roc Records. The album debuted at No. 2 on the Billboard Bluegrass Albums chart, and spent 16 consecutive weeks on the chart. Arm in Arm also reached No. 4 on the Americana/Folk Albums chart, No. 10 on the Current Country Albums chart, and No. 24 on the Record Label Independent Albums chart.

== Background and recording ==
Wiley Cash, author of the New York Times Bestseller, A Land More Kind Than Home, was commissioned to write the liner notes for Arm in Arm. Cash wrote, “Arm In Arm still showcases the sly, wink and nod lyrical turns reminiscent of the best bluegrass songwriters, but on many of the album’s songs, the lyrics – most of which were written by vocalist and banjo player Graham Sharp – are more earnest, characterized by a wistful clinging to a personal past that is not apparent on the Rangers’ previous records. This album is deeper, more personal, more resonant of life and struggle, pain and beauty.” Arm in Arm was recorded at Southern Ground Nashville, the well-known Nashville recording studio founded by fellow musician Zac Brown. The album was Steep Canyon Rangers’ first experience recording without a producer. “Every day, everybody really got to focus on the music. You go to sleep, and you’re humming the song you recorded earlier that day,” said Steep Canyon Ranger’s fiddle player, Nicky Sanders.

== Critical reception ==
Professional ratings
Review scores
Source	Rating
American Songwriter	4.5/5 stars
MOJO	4/5 stars
Uncut	8/10
Americana UK	8/10

Arm in Arm was mentioned in the October 2020 issue of MOJO Magazine who gave the album a 4 out of 5 rating.

An album review for Arm in Arm was also featured in Uncut Magazine, which gave the album an 8 out of 10 rating. Luke Torn said, “... these North Carolinian veterans are just hitting their prime.”

Justin Cober-Lake begins his album review for Spectrum Culture by saying, “Steep Canyon Rangers make tradition something new. Between their songwriting and their collaborations, they seem to have a steady supply of surprises.” Cober-Lake goes on to say, “With novelty, cameos and surprises pushed aside, Arm in Arm relies on the basics, and there’s little basic about Steep Canyon Rangers.”

Henry Carrigan begins his review for No Depression with, “Damn! This album is so good, you’ll be smiling or crying or dancing with every song.”

Prior to the album’s release, Steep Canyon Rangers were named October Artist of the Month by The Bluegrass Situation. Craig Shelburn of The Bluegrass Situation said, "...North Carolina’s Steep Canyon Rangers have always set themselves apart with compelling songwriting and a camaraderie that feels authentic..."

On 17 February 2021, Tim Newby wrote a review for Arm in Arm in which he gave the album an 8 out of 10 rating. Newby ended his article for Americana UK with, "‘Arm in Arm’ continues the forward-thinking evolution and journey of the Steep Canyon Rangers. It is a journey that while never losing sight of bluegrass shores, is unafraid to try to seek out new musical frontiers."

== Track listing ==
No.	Title	Writer(s)	Length
1.	"One Drop of Rain"	Graham Sharp	4:10
2.	"Sunny Days"	Graham Sharp, Andy Buckner	5:05
3.	"Everything You Know"	Graham Sharp, Barrett Smith	4:07
4.	"Every River"	Graham Sharp, Phil Barker	4:21
5.	"Honey On My Tongue"	Graham Sharp	3:23
6.	"In the Next Life"	Graham Sharp, Frank Serio, Michael Ashworth	4:09
7.	"Bullet In the Fire"	Graham Sharp, Andy Buckner	4:42
8.	"Take My Mind" (Featuring Oliver Wood and Michael Bearden)	Graham Sharp	3:43
9.	"A Body Like Yours"	Graham Sharp, Andy Buckner	5:02
10.	"Afterglow"	Graham Sharp, Edward Jurdi	4:50
11.	"Crystal Ship"	Graham Sharp	3:55
Total length:			39:27

== Personnel ==
=== Musicians ===
(Steep Canyon Rangers)

- Woody Platt - Acoustic Guitar, Lead Vocals
- Graham Sharp - Banjo, Lead/Harmony Vocals
- Mike Guggino - Mandolin, Vocals
- Nicky Sanders - Fiddle, Vocals, Accordion
- Mike Ashworth - Drums, Percussion, Vocals, Organ
- Barrett Smith - Upright Bass, Vocals

=== Guest Musicians ===
- Oliver Wood - Slide Guitar and Vocals (Tracks 3, 8)
- Michael Bearden - Piano (Track 8)

=== Production ===
- Produced by Steep Canyon Rangers and Brandon Bell
- Recorded & Mixed by Brandon Bell at Southern Ground Studios in Nashville, TN
- Mastered by Chris Boerner at Kitchen Mastering in Carrboro, NC
- Cover Art: Painting by Shannon Whitworth
- Album Layout / Design: David Hummel
