= Murder for Two =

2011 musical comedy

- Music: Joe Kinosian
- Lyrics: Kellen Blair
- Book: Kellen Blair, Joe Kinosian

Murder for Two is a musical comedy, with book and lyrics by Kellen Blair and book and music by Joe Kinosian. The musical is a whodunit for two actors, who both sing and play an onstage piano. One actor performs the role of a policeman investigating a murder, and the other performs the roles of all the suspects and other characters.

The musical premiered at the Chicago Shakespeare Theater in 2011, where it won a Joseph Jefferson Award for Best New Musical. From 2013 to 2014, it ran off-Broadway at the McGinn/Cazale Theater and New World Stages in New York, where it was nominated for a Drama Desk Award for Outstanding Book of a Musical, as well as an Outer Critics Circle Award for Outstanding New Off-Broadway Musical. The original Off-Broadway cast featured Jeff Blumenkrantz as the Suspects, and Brett Ryback as Marcus. The production was directed by Scott Schwartz. The musical toured the United States in 2015, has been licensed for performances in St. Paul, Fort Worth, Boston, and Seattle, and has been performed abroad in Canada, the United Kingdom, Argentina, and Chile.
