= Hannah Elless =

American actress

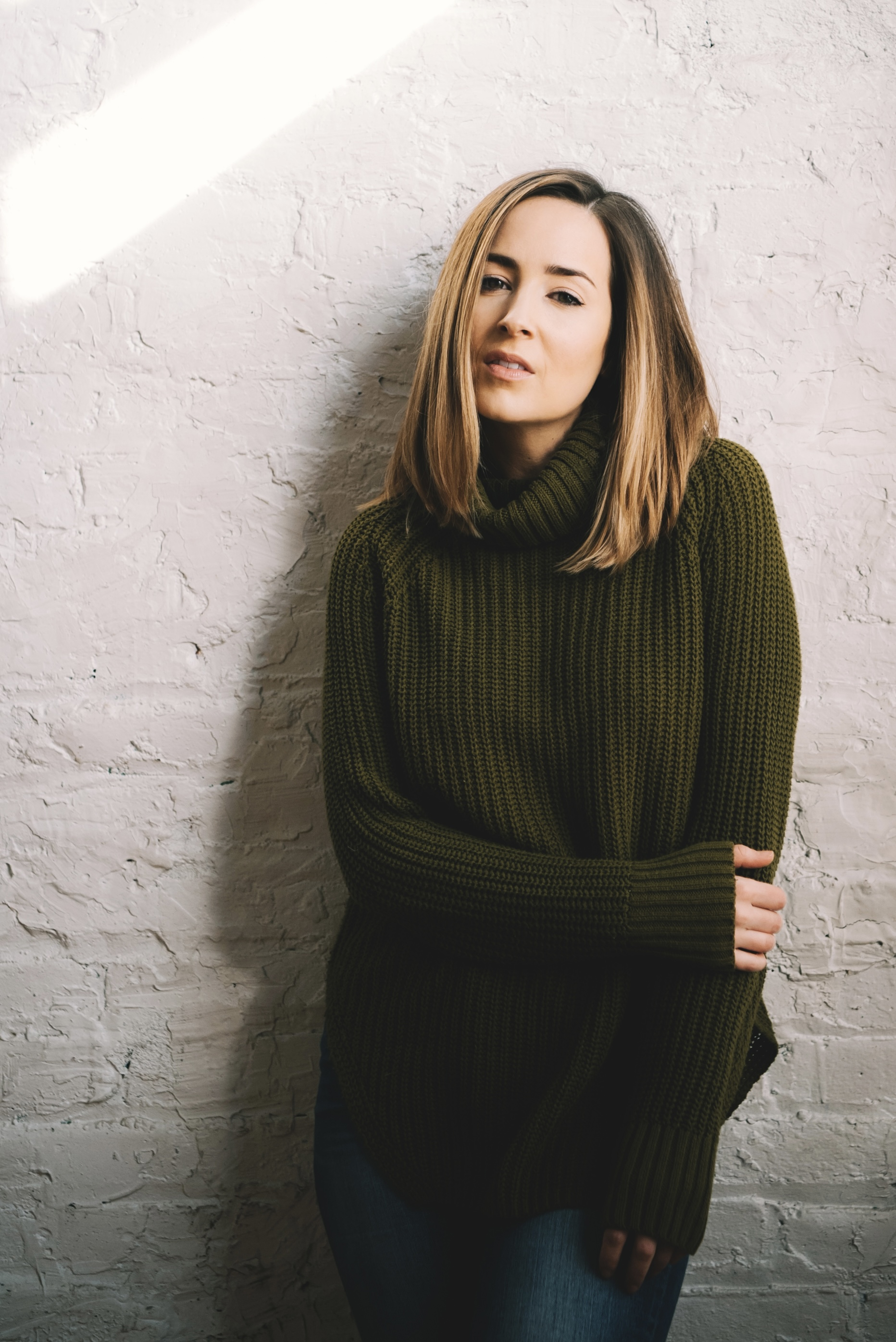
- Education: Western Michigan University (BFA)
- Occupation: Actress
- Years active: 2012–present

Hannah Elless is an American actress, singer, and painter. She is best known for her role as Margo Crawford in the Broadway production of Bright Star written by Steve Martin and Edie Brickell. She made her television debut on HBO's The Deuce.

== Early life and education ==
Elless grew up in Southwest Michigan. She graduated with a Bachelor of Fine Arts degree from Western Michigan University.

== Career ==
Elless made her Broadway debut in the 2012 revival of Stephen Schwartz's Godspell. Her other Broadway credits include Jack Thorne's A Christmas Carol and originating the role of Margo Crawford in Steve Martin and Edie Brickell's Bright Star. Deadline called Elless' performance in Bright Star "radiant." The New York Times described Elless' portrayal of Margo as "genially wry."

Her most recent project has her starring as Mary Follett in Lynn Ahrens' and Stephen Flaherty's new musical, Knoxville, based on both the Pulitzer Prize winning novel, A Death in the Family, by James Agee, and the Pulitzer Prize winning play, All the Way Home, by Tad Mosel.

== Acting credits ==
=== Theatre ===
Year	Title	Role	Venue	Notes	Ref.
2022	Knoxville	Mary Follett	Asolo Repertory Theatre	World premiere	
2019-2020	A Christmas Carol	Jess	Lyceum Theatre	Broadway	
2019	Benny & Joon	Joon	Paper Mill Playhouse	Regional, Original	
2018	The Other Josh Cohen	Drummer/All the People	Westside Theatre	Off-Broadway	
2018	Summer and Smoke	Nellie Ewell	Classic Stage Company	Off-Broadway	
2017	Come Back, Little Sheba	Marie Buckholder	Transport Group	Off-Broadway	
2017	Picnic	Millie Owens	Transport Group	Off-Broadway	
2016	Bright Star	Margo Crawford	James Earl Jones Theatre	Broadway	
2013	Somewhere in Time	Elise McKenna	Portland Center Stage	World premiere	
2012	Godspell	"Bless the Lord"	Circle in the Square Theatre	Broadway	

=== Film/TV ===
Year	Title	Role	Notes
2023	Fortune	Presley	Series Pilot
2022	She's Fine	Caroline	Short Film
2021	Broadway & Salt	Lead	Short Film
2020	The Over/Under	Christine	Feature Film
2018	The Sonnet Project	Sonnet #153	TV Series
2018	Nora Ephron Goes to Prison	Ally	Short Film
2017	The Deuce	Angie	HBO

== Awards and nominations ==
Year	Award	Category	Nominee	Result	Ref.
2018	Craig Noel Award	Outstanding Lead Performance in a Musical, Female	Hannah Elless	Nominated	
