= Bright Star (musical) =

2014 American musical

- Playbill cover of the original Broadway production
- Music: Steve Martin; Edie Brickell
- Lyrics: Edie Brickell
- Book: Steve Martin
- Productions: 2014 San Diego; 2015 Washington, D.C. 2016 Broadway; 2017 US tour 2018 Long Beach, California Musical Theatre West
- Awards: 2016 Drama Desk Award for Outstanding Music; 2016 Outer Critics Circle Award for Outstanding New Score; 2016 Outer Critics Circle Award for Outstanding New Broadway Musical

Bright Star is a musical written and composed by Steve Martin and Edie Brickell. It is set in the Blue Ridge Mountains of North Carolina in 1945–46 with flashbacks to 1923. The musical is inspired by their Grammy-winning collaboration on the 2013 bluegrass album Love Has Come for You and, in turn, the folk tale of the Iron Mountain Baby.

== Productions ==
Bright Star was workshopped by the New York Stage and Film at the Powerhouse Theater at Vassar College in July 2013. It had its world premiere at the Old Globe Theatre in San Diego on September 28, 2014, and ran to November 2, 2014.

The musical opened at the Kennedy Center in Washington, D.C., on December 2, 2015.

The show began previews at the Cort Theatre on Broadway on February 25, 2016, before officially opening on March 24. Directed by Walter Bobbie, the cast featured Carmen Cusack as Alice Murphy, Paul Alexander Nolan as Jimmy Ray Dobbs, A.J. Shively as Billy Cane, Hannah Elless as Margo Crawford, Emily Padgett as Lucy Grant, Jeff Blumenkrantz as Daryl Ames, Michael Mulheren as Mayor Dobbs, Stephen Bogardus as Billy's father, Dee Hoty as Alice's mother, and Stephen Lee Anderson as Alice's father. Sound design was by Nevin Steinberg, choreography by Josh Rhodes, scenic design by Eugene Lee, costume design by Jane Greenwood and lighting design by Japhy Weideman.

Despite financial support from Steve Martin and Edie Brickell and occasional appearances by Martin, the musical closed on June 26, 2016, after 30 previews and 109 regular performances.

A reunion concert was held on December 12, 2016, at Town Hall, New York City. Members of the original Broadway cast participated, with Steve Martin and Edie Brickell both hosting and performing.

A US national tour was announced in January 2017 for the 2017–2018 touring season, with casting and route to be announced later.

The national tour launched on October 11, 2017, at the Ahmanson Theatre in Los Angeles, California, with Carmen Cusack, A.J. Shively, Jeff Blumenkrantz, and Stephen Lee Anderson all reprising their original Broadway roles. Subsequent cities scheduled are San Francisco, CA; Salt Lake City, UT; Houston, TX; Worcester, MA; Raleigh, NC; New Haven, CT; Dallas, TX; and Charlotte, NC, through July 1, 2018.

Following the completion of the national tour, Musical Theatre West in Long Beach, California, bought the rights along with the original sets and costumes. They presented the show in October 2018 and made the sets and costumes available for other theater companies to lease for their own productions of Bright Star.

In March 2019, Bright Star received its Canadian premiere at Rosebud Theatre in Rosebud Alberta, under the direction of Morris Ertman.

In 2019 the production of Bright Star by Rock Ridge Performing Arts high school of Ashburn, Virginia was chosen to perform at that year's International Thespian Festival.

== Plot ==
=== Act I ===
In 1946, editor Alice Murphy greets the audience and tells them that, instead of overseeing other people's stories, she is going to tell her own ("If You Knew My Story"). One year earlier, in the town of Hayes Creek, serviceman and aspiring writer Billy Cane returns home after serving in World War II. He reunites with his father and his childhood friend Margo before learning that his mother has died ("She's Gone"). Several weeks later, Billy visits Margo and tells her he is going to submit his stories to The Asheville Southern Journal ("Bright Star").

Upon arriving at the offices of the Journal, he finds himself rebuffed by employees Daryl and Lucy. However, Alice finds herself charmed by a brazen lie that Billy tells and considers accepting his stories. She later declines Lucy's invitation to a dance, but privately reflects on a time when she would have gone to a dance ("Way Back in the Day").

Flashing back to 1923, a sixteen-year-old Alice flirts with Jimmy Ray Dobbs in her hometown of Zebulon, North Carolina ("Whoa, Mama"). When Alice returns home later that night, her parents reprimand her while pondering her unfortunate future. ("Firmer Hand/Do Right") Meanwhile, Jimmy Ray returns home only to be lectured by his father, Mayor Josiah Dobbs, on what the future holds for him ("A Man's Gotta Do").

In 1945, upon receiving encouragement from Alice in the form of a ten dollar check, Billy decides to settle down in Asheville and dedicate his time to writing. Margo reflects that she had other hopes for her future with Billy, but she decides to put her hopes aside and be supportive of his dreams ("Asheville").

In 1923, Alice and Jimmy Ray make their way to the riverbank ("What Could Be Better"). Sometime later, Alice goes to see the town physician, Doctor Norquist after feeling ill only to learn she is pregnant. Jimmy Ray proposes after learning of her pregnancy, but she is persuaded by Doctor Norquist and Mayor Dobbs to wait to get married in favor of staying in a remote cabin until giving birth. She divides her time in isolation between knitting a sweater for the baby and talking about their child with Jimmy Ray when he visits ("I Can't Wait").

Shortly after giving birth to a baby son, Alice and her mother learn that Mayor Dobbs and Alice's father have supposedly put the child up for adoption. Alice tries to make her father change his mind, but is bullied and demeaned by the room of men who have barged in and overpowered her, and who take her son from her ("Please, Don't Take Him"). Mayor Dobbs departs with the baby in a valise and boards the train to Hayes Creek before throwing the valise into the river when no one is looking ("A Man's Gotta Do [Reprise]").

=== Act II ===
In 1924, Alice prepares to attend college in Chapel Hill and privately yearns to find her son. Meanwhile, in 1945, Margo talks with her friends about how she misses Billy ("Sun Is Gonna Shine"). Back in 1924, Jimmy Ray tells his now ailing father that he is going to meet Alice in Chapel Hill. When Mayor Dobbs confesses what happened to the baby, Jimmy Ray decides to stay with his father after realizing he can't possibly tell Alice the truth ("Heartbreaker").

In 1946, Daryl and Lucy encounter a creatively frustrated Billy while sharing an after-work drink and try to cheer him up, culminating in Lucy and Billy sharing a drunken kiss ("Another Round"). The next day, Alice tells Billy that one of his stories is set to be published in the Journal. He confesses that he has been writing about Hayes Creek before inviting her to see where his stories take place. She agrees to do so after a planned visit to Raleigh to complete some unfinished business.

In Raleigh, Alice requests permission to look through adoption papers drafted during the period when her son would have been registered. After failing to find what she is looking for, Alice encounters Jimmy Ray and learns about Josiah's actions. Believing their son to be dead, the two reaffirm their love for each other ("I Had a Vision"). Back in Hayes Creek, Billy tells Margo that he's moving back home before realizing that she's the girl for him ("Always Will").

In Zebulon, Alice reconciles with her father after he apologizes for allowing Josiah to take the baby away from her. Not wanting to continue his distress any longer, she tells him the child was adopted by a good family and is living a successful life. She makes her way to Hayes Creek and sees Billy's childhood home where she discovers the baby sweater she sent with her son, discovering that she is Billy's birth mother as his father explains how he found Billy as a baby in the river, but Billy is too shocked to process it and runs off ("So Familiar/At Long Last"). A few weeks later, after Alice has told Jimmy Ray that their child is still alive, Billy and Margo approach them in Asheville and Billy apologizes to Alice, accepting her as his mother and meeting Jimmy Ray for the first time. In order to fend off a flirtatious Lucy, Margo introduces herself as Billy's fiancée, much to Billy's pleasant shock, followed by Jimmy Ray proposing to Alice ("Finale").

== Musical numbers ==
Act I

- "If You Knew My Story" — Alice, Company
- "She's Gone" — Daddy Cane, Billy
- "Bright Star" — Billy, Ensemble
- "Way Back in the Day" — Alice, Ensemble
- "Whoa, Mama" — Jimmy Ray, Alice, Ensemble
- "Firmer Hand / Do Right" — Daddy Murphy, Mama Murphy, Alice, Ensemble
- "A Man's Gotta Do" — Mayor Dobbs, Jimmy Ray
- "Asheville" — Margo, Ensemble
- "Picnic Dance" — Stanford
- "What Could Be Better" — Jimmy Ray, Alice, Ensemble
- "I Can't Wait" — Alice, Jimmy Ray, Ensemble
- "Please Don't Take Him" — Mayor Dobbs, Alice, Daddy Murphy, Mama Murphy, Stanford, Ensemble
- "A Man's Gotta Do (Reprise)" — Mayor Dobbs, Ensemble

Act II

- Entr'acte — Orchestra
- "Sun's Gonna Shine" — Alice, Mama Murphy, Margo, Daddy Cane, Florence, Edna, Ensemble
- "Heartbreaker" — Jimmy Ray
- "Another Round" — Lucy, Daryl, Billy, Ensemble
- "I Had a Vision" — Jimmy Ray, Alice
- "Always Will" — Billy, Margo, Ensemble
- "Sun's Gonna Shine (Reprise)" — Mama Murphy
- "I Can't Wait (Reprise)" — Ensemble
- "So Familiar / At Long Last" — Alice, Ensemble
- "Finale" — Jimmy Ray, Alice, Billy, Margo, Company
- "Bows / Bright Star (Reprise)" — Company

All songs contain music by Martin and Brickell with lyrics by Brickell except "Way Back in the Day" and "At Long Last" by Edie Brickell and "Bright Star" with ensemble lyrics by Martin. "Way Back in the Day", "I Can't Wait", "Heartbreaker", "Another Round", "I Had a Vision", "Always Will" and "So Familiar" all were included on the album So Familiar. "Asheville" and "Sun's Gonna Shine" both originated from the album Love Has Come for You.

== Principal roles and original cast ==
Character	San Diego	Kennedy Center	Broadway	US tour
Character	2014	2015	2016	2017
Alice Murphy	Carmen Cusack	Carmen Cusack	Carmen Cusack	Carmen Cusack
Jimmy Ray Dobbs	Wayne Alan Wilcox	Paul Alexander Nolan	Paul Alexander Nolan	Patrick Cummings
Billy Cane	A.J. Shively	A.J. Shively	A.J. Shively	A.J. Shively
Margo Crawford	Hannah Elless	Hannah Elless	Hannah Elless	Maddie Shea Baldwin
Mayor Josiah Dobbs	Wayne Duvall	Michael Mulheren	Michael Mulheren	Jeff Austin
Daddy Cane	Stephen Bogardus	Stephen Bogardus	Stephen Bogardus	David Atkinson
Daddy Murphy	Stephen Lee Anderson	Stephen Lee Anderson	Stephen Lee Anderson	Stephen Lee Anderson
Mama Murphy	Patti Cohenour	Dee Hoty	Dee Hoty	Allison Briner-Dardenne
Daryl Ames	Jeff Hiller	Jeff Blumenkrantz	Jeff Blumenkrantz	Jeff Blumenkrantz
Lucy Grant	Kate Loprest	Emily Padgett	Emily Padgett	Kaitlyn Davidson
Dora Murphy	Libby Winters	Does not appear	Does not appear	Does not appear

== Reception ==
Charles Isherwood of The New York Times wrote:

"The shining achievement of the musical is its winsome country and bluegrass score, with music by Mr. Martin and Ms. Brickell, and lyrics by Ms. Brickell. The complicated plot, divided between two love stories that turn out to have an unusual connection, threatens to get a little too diffuse and unravel like a ball of yarn rolling off a knitter's lap. But the songs — yearning ballads and square-dance romps rich with fiddle, piano and banjo, beautifully played by a nine-person band — provide a buoyancy that keeps the momentum from stalling."

Bob Verini of Variety praised the music but thought, "characterizations are distinctly undercooked. Guileless Billy seems untouched by wartime service, too callow to craft greeting cards let alone the 'sweeping tale of pain and redemption' Alice unaccountably expects of him", and that the show could benefit with higher stakes in its drama.

Kai Elijah Hamilton of Mountain Xpress, reviewing a regional production of Bright Star, wrote:

"While Martin and singer-songwriter Brickell's passion is evident, this is not the most authentic representation of life in North Carolina. Incorporating a deeply rooted Southern writer would have made the journey more rewarding. Most of the characters are not well sculpted, and although the script certainly has its moments, it is largely predictable. However, the music here is truly masterful and becomes a prominent storytelling device."

=== Broadway ===
The Broadway production received fairly positive reviews. For instance, Elysa Gardner, in her review in USA Today, wrote:

"...Martin, a master ironist, captures some of that old-school spirit with a book that's as forthright as it is smart, funny and charming....Martin and Brickell refuse to condescend to their own characters, from the small-townspeople Billy grows up with to the wry, knowing employees at Alice's highly regarded journal in the city of Asheville....The tone in which that story is delivered can also wobble a bit, especially later on, when what seems destined to be a majestic, Hammerstein-esque resolution is mitigated by zany musical-comedy flourishes. Still, in what may well prove to be the richest Broadway season for new musicals in decades, this gently shining Star holds its own."

== Recording ==
The original Broadway cast album, produced by Ghostlight Records, was recorded in March 2016 and released in May 2016 in stores. It was released in digital format on April 29, 2016. The album peaked at number two on the US Cast albums chart and topped the US Bluegrass and Americana/Folk Albums charts, the first cast recording to enter either of the latter two charts. In its review of the recording, NPR said that the "interlocking narrative can't help but lose some of its detail", but that "Bright Star's best moments shine, well, brightly....the net result is a set of songs in which lavish stage settings and broad flourishes can't obscure the simple warmth and lovely instrumentation at their core." The album received a Grammy Award nomination for the 2017 Grammy Award for Best Musical Theater Album.

== Awards and nominations ==
Year	Award	Category	Nominee	Result
2016	Tony Award	Best Musical		Nominated
2016	Tony Award	Best Book of a Musical	Steve Martin	Nominated
2016	Tony Award	Best Original Score	Steve Martin and Edie Brickell	Nominated
2016	Tony Award	Best Actress in a Musical	Carmen Cusack	Nominated
2016	Tony Award	Best Orchestrations	August Eriksmoen	Nominated
2016	Drama Desk Award	Outstanding Actress in a Musical	Carmen Cusack	Nominated
2016	Drama Desk Award	Outstanding Featured Actor in a Musical	Paul Alexander Nolan	Nominated
2016	Drama Desk Award	Outstanding Featured Actor in a Musical	A.J. Shively	Nominated
2016	Drama Desk Award	Outstanding Music	Steve Martin and Edie Brickell	Won
2016	Drama Desk Award	Outstanding Orchestrations	August Eriksmoen	Nominated
2016	Drama Desk Award	Outstanding Costume Design for a Musical	Jane Greenwood	Nominated
2016	Drama Desk Award	Outstanding Sound Design in a Musical	Nevin Steinberg	Nominated
2016	Drama League Award	Outstanding Production of a Broadway or Off-Broadway Musical		Nominated
2016	Drama League Award	Distinguished Performance	Carmen Cusack	Nominated
2016	Theatre World Awards	Outstanding Debut Performance	Carmen Cusack	Won
2016	Outer Critics Circle Award	Outstanding New Broadway Musical		Won
2016	Outer Critics Circle Award	Outstanding Book of a Musical	Steve Martin	Nominated
2016	Outer Critics Circle Award	Outstanding New Score	Steve Martin and Edie Brickell	Won
2016	Outer Critics Circle Award	Outstanding Choreographer	Josh Rhodes	Nominated
2016	Outer Critics Circle Award	Outstanding Actress in a Musical	Carmen Cusack	Nominated
2016	Outer Critics Circle Award	Outstanding Costume Design	Jane Greenwood	Nominated
2016	Outer Critics Circle Award	Outstanding Director of a Musical	Walter Bobbie	Nominated
2016	Fred and Adele Astaire Awards	Best Choreographer	Josh Rhodes	Nominated
2016	Fred and Adele Astaire Awards	Outstanding Ensemble in a Broadway Show		Nominated
2017	Grammy Award	Best Musical Theater Album		Nominated
