= Nobody Knows You =

Studio album by Steep Canyon Rangers
- Released: March 26, 2012
- Recorded: Echo Mountain Recording, Asheville, NC
- Genre: Bluegrass
- Length: 45:46
- Label: Rounder Records
- Producer: Gary Paczosa, Steep Canyon Rangers

Steep Canyon Rangers chronology
Rare Bird Alert (2011)	Nobody Knows You (2012)	Tell The Ones I Love (2013)

Professional ratings
Review scores
Source	Rating
Allmusic	4/5 stars

Nobody Knows You is a studio album by Steep Canyon Rangers released in 2012 through Rounder Records. In January 2013, the record won the Grammy Award for Best Bluegrass Album, which was presented to Steep Canyon Rangers as artists and co-producers of the album alongside Gary Paczosa. The album peaked at #2 on Billboard's Top Bluegrass Albums chart.

== Track listing ==
All tracks are written by Graham Sharp, unless otherwise indicated.

No.	Title	Writer(s)	Length
1.	"Nobody Knows You"		3:41
2.	"Rescue Me"	Charles Humphrey III, Phillip Wofford Barker	3:42
3.	"Easy To Love"		3:42
4.	"Between Midnight and the Dawn"	Graham Sharp, John Scott Sherrill	4:16
5.	"As I Go"		3:04
6.	"Natural Disaster"	Charles Humphrey III, Jonathan Byrd	3:35
7.	"Ungrateful One"		3:22
8.	"Summer Winds"	Charles Humphrey III, Phillip Wofford Barker	4:35
9.	"Open Country"		3:38
10.	"Knob Creek"	Mike Guggino	5:17
11.	"Reputation"	Tim Hardin	3:42
12.	"Long Shot"		3:06

== Personnel ==
- Charles R Humphrey III - bass, harmony vocals
- Mike Guggino- mandolin, mandola, harmony vocals
- Woody Platt - guitar, vocals
- Nicky Sanders - fiddle, vocals
- Graham Sharp - banjo, guitar, vocals

Guests

- John Gardner - drums (track 12)
- Randy Kohrs - resonator guitar (track 9)
- Jon Randall - guitar (track 9)
- Jimmy Wallace - piano (track 3)
