= Love Has Come for You =

2013 studio album by Steve Martin and Edie Brickell

Studio album by Steve Martin and Edie Brickell
- Released: April 23, 2013
- Recorded: The Living Room, West Nyack, New York; Kung Fu Bakery, Portland, Oregon; East West Studios, Los Angeles, California; Village Recorders, Los Angeles, California; Abbey Road Studios, London, England; Oceanway, Los Angeles, California; The Sound Company, London, England
- Genre: Bluegrass
- Length: 36:12
- Label: Rounder
- Producer: Peter Asher

Steve Martin chronology
Rare Bird Alert (2011)	Love Has Come for You (2013)	Steve Martin and the Steep Canyon Rangers featuring Edie Brickell LIVE (2014)

Love Has Come for You is a 2013 bluegrass music CD featuring a collaboration of 13 original songs composed by Steve Martin (music) and Edie Brickell (music and lyrics). The album cover art is a painting entitled "After Dinner Drinks" (2008) by Martin Mull; the original work is in Steve Martin's personal art collection.

Produced by Peter Asher, the album features musical appearances by bassist Esperanza Spalding, fiddlers Nicky Sanders and Sara Watkins, and guitarist Waddy Wachtel. Backing vocals and instrumental accompaniment were also performed by all contemporaneous members of the band Steep Canyon Rangers who would tour extensively with Martin and Brickell following the record release.

Altered versions of "When You Get to Asheville" and "Sun's Gonna Shine" later appeared in Martin and Brickell's 2014 musical, Bright Star.

== Background ==
Describing his partnership with Brickell, Martin described it as a giant accident that turned out to be very rewarding. The groundwork for the project arose from casual conversations in which Brickell had complimented Martin on his bluegrass records, and he in turn, offered her a melody he’d composed, but for which he did not have any lyrics. Impressed with Brickell's writing and singing ability, Martin quickly expressed interest to further their collaboration, even though at the time Brickell and Martin lived on opposite coasts. Their first common experiment would come to fruition as the duo's first song, "Sun’s Gonna Shine."

The two started to exchange files electronically as Martin sent banjo tracks to Brickell who then wrote lyrics to match them. The duo's second song, created by this long-distance method would become “When You Get to Asheville,” the album's leading track. According to Martin in this early stage the project was without any set goal — "We were being led by the songs, not any kind of deal or agent" as he would later recall.

As the duo was fine-tuning their demo tracks and passing them back and forth, Peter Asher was brought on as the project's producer. Asher suggested that the songs could make for an unorthodox album, as Brickell's contemporary lyrics provided an opportunity for the album to transcend Martin's traditional bluegrass style. As he would later recall for The New York Times, “You didn’t have to restrict yourself to the bluegrass palette, which is a relatively formal one. It’s like if you’re writing Baroque chamber music, you only have a certain number of instruments to choose between. You don’t think, what about a few electronic parts? What about a Fender Rhodes keyboard sound? Or what, indeed, about a drummer?” The final product is an album informed by bluegrass, but breaking from the genre’s boundaries.

== Track listing ==
1. "When You Get to Asheville" – 3:15
2. "Get Along Stray Dog" – 2:10
3. "Love Has Come for You" – 3:08
4. "Friend of Mine" – 2:36
5. "Siamese Cat" – 2:57
6. "Yes She Did" – 1:34
7. "Sarah Jane and the Iron Mountain Baby" – 3:12
8. "Fighter" – 2:40
9. "King of Boys" – 2:51
10. "Sun's Gonna Shine" – 3:05
11. "Who You Gonna Take?" – 2:41
12. "Shawnee" – 2:29
13. "Remember Me This Way" – 3:31

== Commercial performance ==
Professional ratings
Review scores
Source	Rating
AllMusic	4/5 stars
American Songwriter	4/5 stars
Rolling Stone	3/5 stars

The album debuted at No. 21 on the Billboard 200 albums chart on its release, selling around 15,000 copies in the United States in its first week. It also debuted at No. 1 on Billboard's Bluegrass Albums, and No. 2 on the Folk Albums chart. The album has sold 104,000 copies in the United States as of August 2015.

== Personnel ==
- Edie Brickell – vocals
- Steve Martin – 5-string banjo, vocals

Additional musicians

- Peter Asher – percussion, acoustic guitar
- Thomas Fetherstonhaugh – choir vocals
- Mike Guggino – mandolin, background vocals
- Sean Hill – choir vocals
- Stephen Hilton – synthesisers, electronic percussion
- Charles Humphrey – double bass
- Patrick Kiernan – violin
- Perry Montague Mason – violin
- Kate Musker – viola
- Joseph Outtrim – choir vocals
- Woody Platt – background vocals
- Anthony Pleeth – cello
- Matt Rollings – accordion, Fender Rhodes, piano, Wurlitzer
- Jeff Alan Ross – electric guitar
- Nicky Sanders – fiddle
- Noah Scoffield – choir vocals
- Graham Sharp – background vocals
- Esperanza Spalding – bass, double bass
- Aaron Sterling – cajón, percussion, drums
- Waddy Wachtel – acoustic and electric guitars
- Ian Walker – bass, double bass
- Sara Watkins – fiddle
- Sean Watkins – acoustic guitar
- Stacy Watton – double bass
- The Webb Sisters – background vocals
- Geoff Zanelli – arranger, string arranger, dulcitone

== Music video ==
"Love Has Come for You" was made into a lyric video and published on Steve Martin's website.

== Charts ==
Chart (2013)	Peak position
US Billboard 200	21
US Top Bluegrass Albums (Billboard)	1
US Folk Albums (Billboard)	2
US Top Tastemaker Albums (Billboard)	14
