= Nicky Sanders =

American fiddle player, musician, and composer

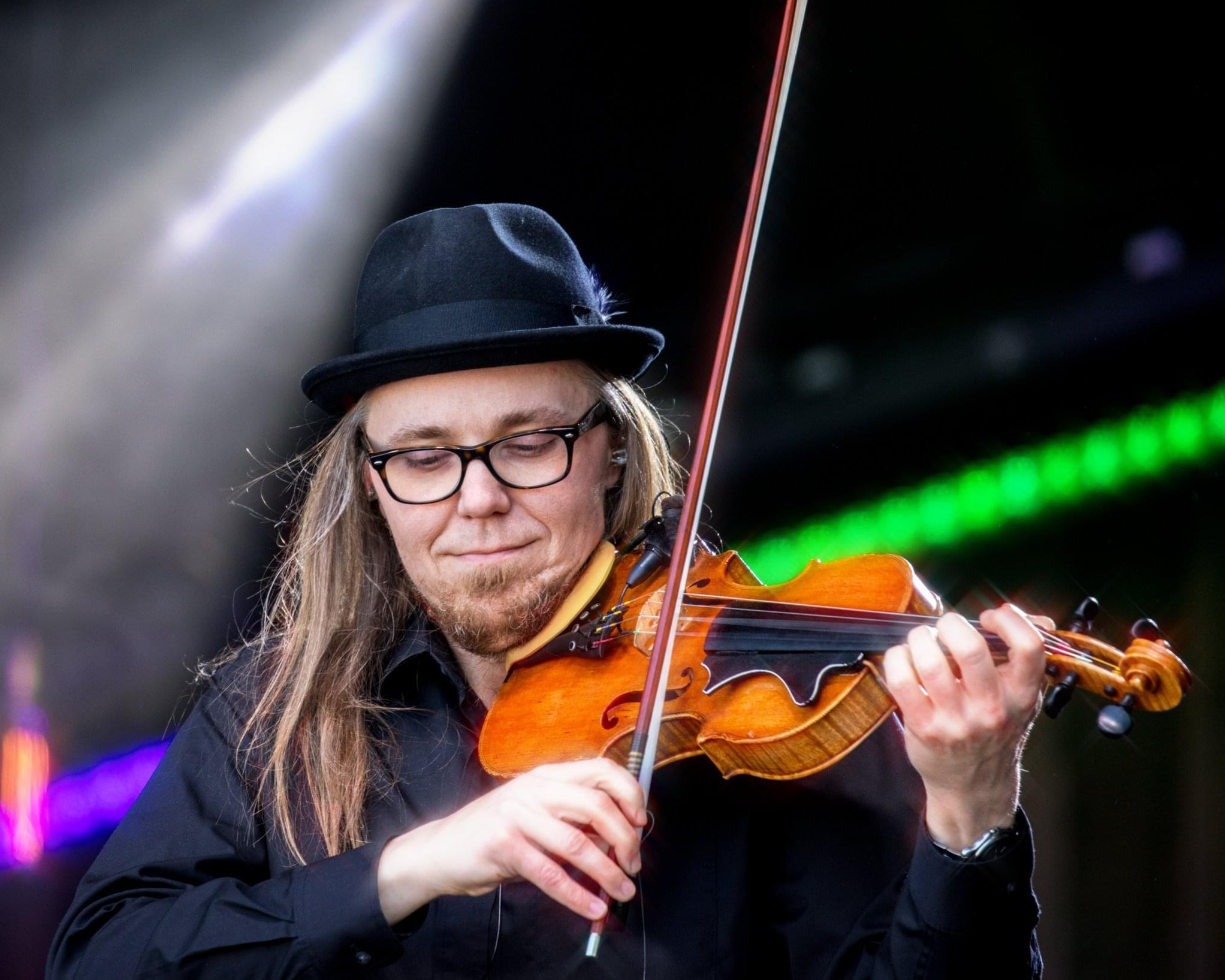
- Sanders at MerleFest 2019 in Wilkesboro, NC

Background information
- Born: 16 August 1979 (age 46)
- Genres: Bluegrass, Rock
- Instruments: Fiddle, Vocals
- Years active: 2000–present
- Label: Yep Roc Records
- Website: SteepCanyon.com

Nicky Sanders is a Grammy Award-winning, American fiddle player specializing in Bluegrass music. He is best known for his work with the band Steep Canyon Rangers along with banjo player and comedian Steve Martin. Raised in San Francisco, he began studying classical violin aged five. At 17, he became concertmaster of the Young People's Symphony Orchestra in Berkeley, California. Later he would graduate Berklee College of Music in Boston, Massachusetts earning a BA in Music with a major in performance (violin). Other studies while at Berklee included 20th-century classical music composition and Film Scoring.

== With Steep Canyon Rangers ==
In 2004, Nicky relocated to Asheville, North Carolina, where he joined Steep Canyon Rangers as full-time fiddle player. His first CD appearance with the Rangers was on their fourth album, "One Dime at a Time" (2005) produced by Mike Bub (Del McCoury Band). The next year, Steep Canyon Rangers band won Emerging Artist of the Year at the 2006 International Bluegrass Music Association Awards ceremony. The Rangers recorded a fiddle tune written by Sanders entitled "Mourning Dove" on the 2009 album "Deep in the Shade." The song was nominated for IBMA Instrumental Song of the Year in 2010.

In 2013, the Steep Canyon Rangers' album Nobody Knows You won the Grammy Award for Best Bluegrass Album. The previous year, the band's 2012 collaboration with Steve Martin, Rare Bird Alert, was nominated for the same award.

== With Steve Martin ==
In May 2009, Steve Martin and the Steep Canyon Rangers performed their first joint concert at Club Nokia in Los Angeles, California. The sextet appeared the following month on A Prairie Home Companion. Since then, the Steep Canyon Rangers have continued to tour steadily with Martin and recorded with him on the Grammy-nominated bluegrass album Rare Bird Alert.

On July 4, 2011, Nicky Sanders was featured in a performance of "Orange Blossom Special" with Martin and SCR at the Capitol Fourth celebration on the West Lawn of the U.S. Capitol Building.

Sanders is a featured musician (with members of Steep Canyon Rangers) on Martin's 2013 duo album with singer-songwriter Edie Brickell, Love Has Come for You.

== With Widespread Panic ==
Sanders first appeared as a guest with the jam band Widespread Panic in November 2013 at the Civic Center in Asheville, North Carolina, after appearing on lead guitarist Jimmy Herring's solo album Subject to Change Without Notice (2012). In April 2014, he sat in with Panic for a two-night stand at the Orpheum Theatre (Los Angeles) and then again 10 days later at the North Carolina Azalea Festival. In July, he appeared at the close of Panic's second set at High Sierra Music Festival. The final guest appearances in 2014 were in Milwaukee, Wisconsin, at the Riverside Theater and in Broomfield, Colorado, on November 2. In July 2015, Sanders returned to guest with Widespread Panic in Dallas, Texas, at the Winspear Opera House.

== Discography ==
=== with Steep Canyon Rangers ===
- One Dime at a Time (2005)
- Lovin' Pretty Women (2007)
- Deep in the Shade (2009)
- Nobody Knows You (2012) (Winner, Grammy Award for Best Bluegrass Album)
- Tell The Ones I Love (2013)
- Radio (2015)
- Out in the Open (2018)
- North Carolina Songbook (LIVE at MerleFest) (2019)
- Be Still Moses (w/ Asheville Symphony) (2020)
- Arm in Arm (2020)
- Morning Shift (2023)

=== with Steve Martin and Steep Canyon Rangers ===
- Rare Bird Alert (2011)
- LIVE: Steve Martin and the Steep Canyon Rangers feat. Edie Brickell (2014)

=== Steve Martin and Edie Brickell ===
- Love Has Come for You (2013)

=== Jimmy Herring ===
- Subject to Change Without Notice (2012)
