= Rare Bird Alert =

Studio album by Steve Martin & Steep Canyon Rangers
- Released: March 15, 2011; 14 years ago
- Studio: Echo Mountain, Asheville, North Carolina
- Genre: Bluegrass, pop, country, comedy music
- Length: 41:30
- Label: Rounder
- Producer: Tony Trischka

Steve Martin chronology
The Crow: New Songs for the 5-String Banjo (2009)	Rare Bird Alert (2011)	Love Has Come for You (2013)

Steep Canyon Rangers chronology
Deep in the Shade (2009)	Rare Bird Alert (2011)	Nobody Knows You (2012)

Professional ratings
Review scores
Source	Rating
AllMusic	4/5 stars

Rare Bird Alert is a 2011 bluegrass album by Steve Martin and the Steep Canyon Rangers, featuring guest appearances by Paul McCartney and the Dixie Chicks. This is Martin's second consecutive musical album, and comprises 13 songs. His first all-music album was 2009's The Crow: New Songs for the 5-String Banjo. Rare Bird Alert was first released on March 15, 2011. The album was nominated for a Grammy on November 30, 2011 (Best Bluegrass Album). "King Tut", recorded live, is a new bluegrass arrangement of a comedy song that was a Billboard top 20 hit for Martin in 1978.

== Track listing ==
All songs written by Steve Martin except where noted.

1. "Rare Bird Alert" [Instrumental]
2. "Yellow-Backed Fly" – Woody Platt & Mike Guggino on vocals
3. "Best Love" – Paul McCartney on vocals
4. "Northern Island" [Instrumental]
5. "Go Away, Stop, Turn Around, Come Back" – Woody Platt & Mike Guggino on vocals (comp. Steve Martin, Nicky Sanders, Woody Platt, Graham Sharp, Charles R. Humphrey III & John Frazier)
6. "Jubilation Day" – Steve Martin & Steep Canyon Rangers on vocals
7. "More Bad Weather On The Way" – Steep Canyon Rangers on vocals
8. "You" – Dixie Chicks on vocals
9. "The Great Remember (for Nancy)" [Instrumental]
10. "Women Like To Slow Dance" – Steep Canyon Rangers & Steve Martin on vocals (comp. Steve Martin, Philip Barker & Charles R. Humphrey III)
11. "Hide Behind A Rock" [Instrumental]
12. "Atheists Don't Have No Songs" – Steep Canyon Rangers & Steve Martin on vocals (comp. Steve Martin, Graham Sharp & Woody Platt)
13. "King Tut" – Steve Martin & Steep Canyon Rangers on vocals

== Other editions ==
A Deluxe Limited Edition was released and is packaged in a full-length vinyl LP in gatefold packaging, and includes a limited edition t-shirt, novelty cards and DRM-free digital downloads of the entire album. Other editions include a mixed variety between vinyl, CD and digital download.

== Music video ==
"Jubilation Day" was made into an animated music video depicting the heads of Steve Martin, along with the Steep Canyon Rangers, over the bodies of various birds.

== Chart performance ==
Chart (2011)	Peak position
U.S. Billboard 200	43
U.S. Billboard Top Bluegrass Albums	1
