= Steep Canyon Rangers =

American bluegrass band

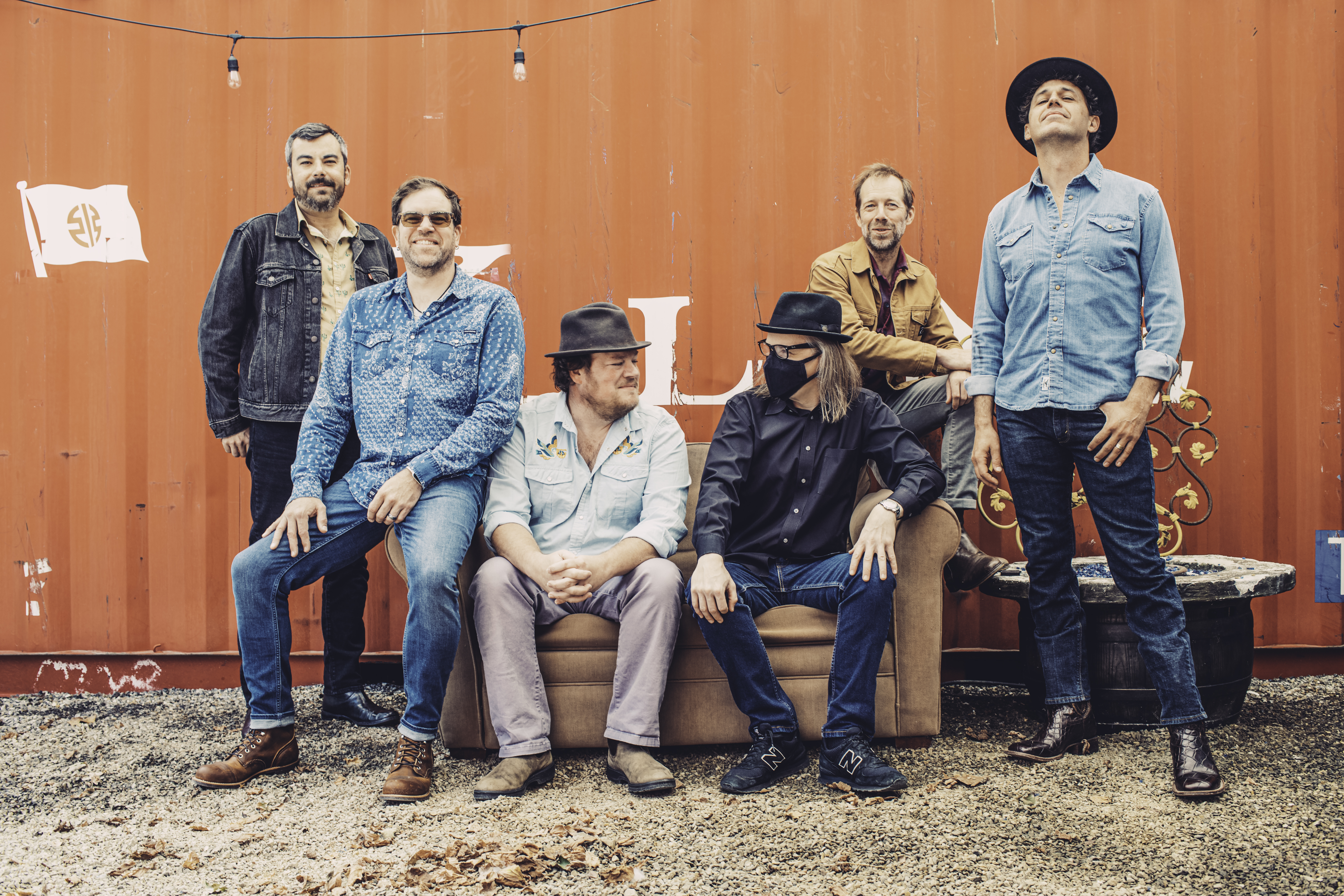
- Steep Canyon Rangers in 2022

Background information
- Origin: Brevard, North Carolina, U.S.
- Genre: Bluegrass
- Years active: 2000–present
- Label: Yep Roc
- Members: Graham Sharp; Mike Guggino; Nicky Sanders; Mike Ashworth; Barrett Smith; Aaron Burdett
- Past members: Lizzie Hamilton; Charles Humphrey; Woody Platt
- Website: steepcanyon.com

Steep Canyon Rangers is an American bluegrass band based in Asheville and Brevard, North Carolina.

Originally formed in 2000, the band has become widely known since 2009 for collaborating with actor/banjoist Steve Martin. SCR performed as a quintet for nearly a decade before intermittent touring began as a sextet with Martin; the band still performs in both configurations.

Steep Canyon Rangers have recorded nine solo albums plus two collaborative albums with Martin. In 2012, their collaboration with Martin, Rare Bird Alert (2012), was nominated for a Grammy Award for Best Bluegrass Album.

In 2013, the Steep Canyon Rangers' solo album Nobody Knows You won the Grammy Award for Best Bluegrass Album.

In May 2013, Martin and SCR began performing with Edie Brickell after she and Martin co-wrote and recorded Love Has Come for You.

== Personnel ==
=== Current members ===
- Graham Sharp – banjo, electric banjo, harmonica, harmony & lead vocals (2000–present)
- Mike Guggino – mandolin, mandola, harmony vocals (2000–present)
- Nicky Sanders – fiddle, harmony vocals (2004–present)
- Mike Ashworth – drums, box kit, cajón, dobro, harmony vocals (2013–present)
- Barrett Smith – upright bass, harmony vocals (2018–present)
- Aaron Burdett – lead vocals, guitar (2022–present)

=== Former members ===
- Woody Platt – lead vocals, guitar (2000–2022)
- Lizzie Hamilton – fiddle, vocals (2000–2003)
- Charles Humphrey III – upright bass (2000–2017)

== History ==
=== Early years ===
Steep Canyon Rangers formed in 2000 while students at the University of North Carolina in Chapel Hill. The core group consisted of Woody Platt (guitar), Graham Sharp (banjo) and Charles R. Humphrey III (upright bass). Early on, Platt's childhood friend, Mike Guggino (mandolin), was asked to join. With original fiddler Lizzie Hamilton completing the quintet, Steep Canyon Rangers garnered fans across the U.S. performing festivals from North Carolina to Colorado. Two albums of original music were recorded with the early lineup: Old Dreams and New Dreams and Mr. Taylor's New Home. In 2001, the Rangers took first prize in Lyons, CO at the Rockygrass Festival band competition earning the Rangers a main stage performance the following year. Hamilton left the group in 2003 but heavy touring continued with a rotation of fiddlers leading up to the eponymous CD Steep Canyon Rangers (released 2004) on Rebel Records. The album contained a dozen more original songs and featured guest fiddlers including Josh Goforth.

=== Fiddle commitment ===
In 2004, Nicky Sanders approached the band for the position of full-time fiddle player and subsequently joined in July. The Rangers recorded their fourth album, One Dime at a Time in 2005 with producer Mike Bub (Del McCoury Band). The next year the band won Emerging Artist of the Year at the International Bluegrass Music Association Awards ceremony. Following the release of their fifth album in 2007, the band received two more IBMA nominations for Best Album (Lovin' Pretty Women) and Gospel Performance of the Year ("Be Still Moses").

In 2010, Sanders's fiddle tune "Mourning Dove" was nominated for IBMA Instrumental Song of the Year.

=== With Steve Martin ===
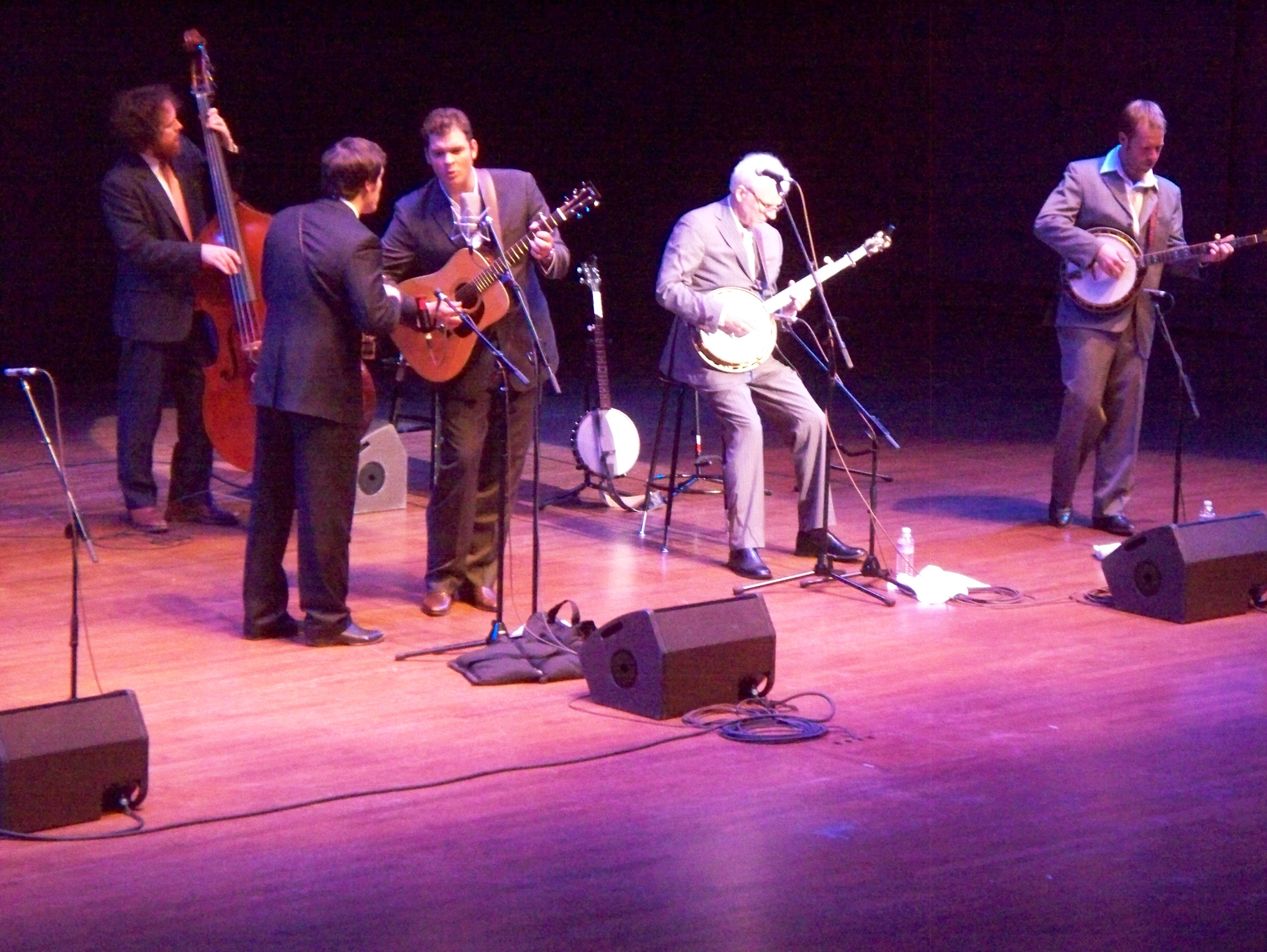
Steve Martin playing with the Steep Canyon Rangers in Seattle (2009).

In May 2009, Steep Canyon Rangers were asked by banjoist/comedian Steve Martin to perform with him (as a sextet) in a benefit concert for the Los Angeles Public Library: featuring banjo and comedy. This first collaborative performance took place at Club Nokia in Los Angeles, CA and was met with much acclaim. Martin subsequently asked the Rangers to accompany him on a "world bluegrass tour" taking the group to venues such as Carnegie Hall (New York), Royal Festival Hall (London) and the Wang Center in Boston. While in England, the group also performed on the critically acclaimed music TV show, Later with Jools Holland. On June 27, 2009, Steve Martin and SCR were featured on a broadcast of A Prairie Home Companion. Soon after, Martin played with the band at the Hardly Strictly Bluegrass festival in San Francisco. and Benaroya Hall in Seattle. Martin appeared with the Steep Canyon Rangers at the 2010 Bonnaroo Music Festival and then on Austin City Limits on November 6, 2010. On July 4, 2011, Martin and SCR performed A Capitol Fourth celebration on the West Lawn of the US Capitol Building.

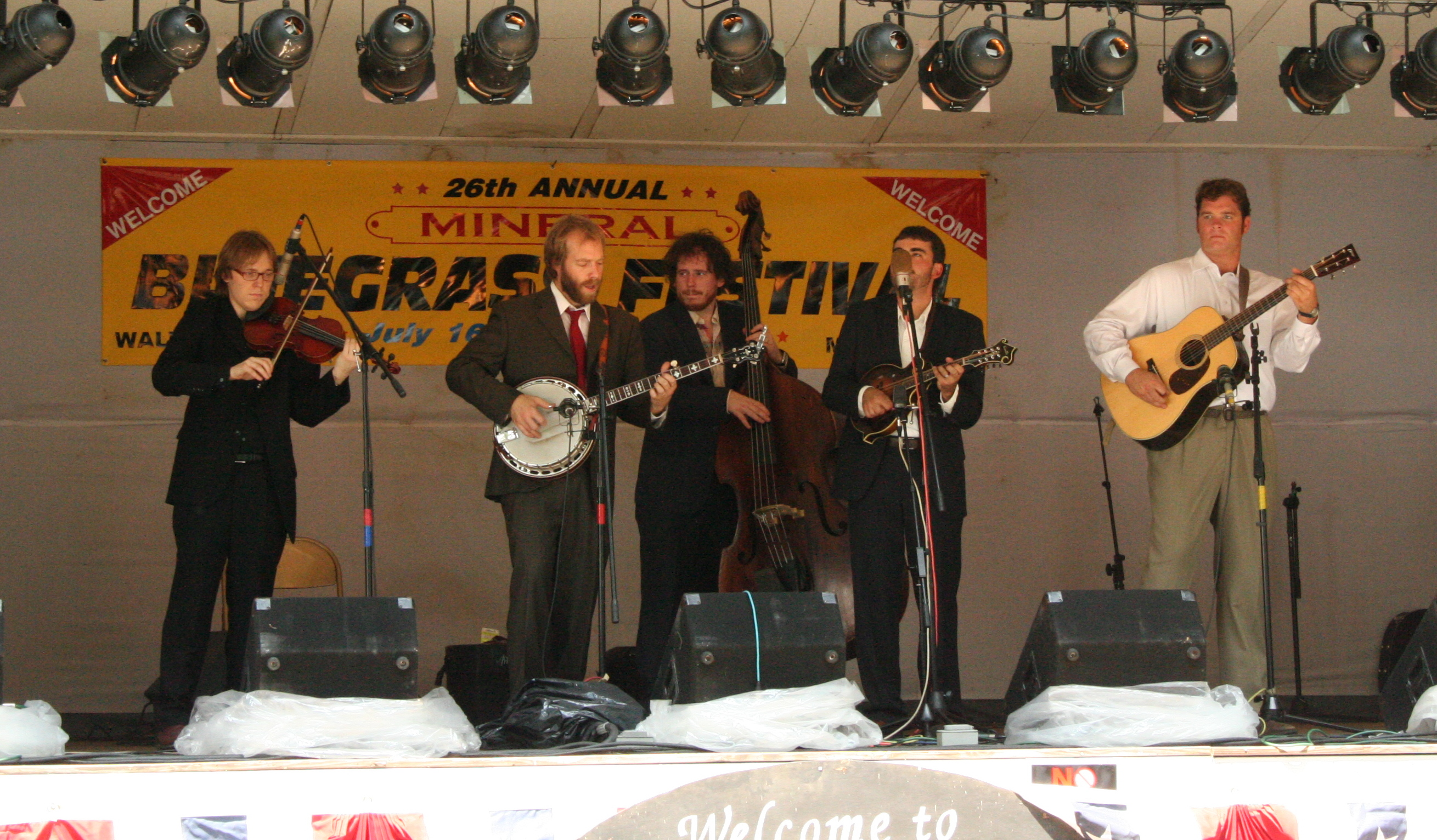
Steep Canyon Rangers on stage at the Mineral Bluegrass Festival in Mineral, Virginia, July 2009.

In the summer of 2010, Martin and SCR recorded their first collaborative album, Rare Bird Alert at Echo Mountain Recording in Asheville, NC. The album contained tracks primarily composed by Martin and featured guest vocal appearances by Paul McCartney and the Dixie Chicks. The CD was released the following March, and then on September 29, 2011, Martin and the Rangers were jointly named Entertainers of the Year at the IBMA Awards ceremony in Nashville, TN. In May 2012, Martin and the Rangers played at the fifth annual DelFest as a headlining act.

In 2013, the Steep Canyon Rangers added drummer Mike Ashworth to tour with Steve Martin and Edie Brickell in support of their new album, Love Has Come for You. Later the Steep Canyon Rangers announced that Ashworth would be a permanent addition to the band.

In September 2017 Steep Canyon Rangers released The Long-Awaited Album with Martin. A few months later, Out in the Open was released on January 26, 2018, but without Martin in the band.

=== Continued touring ===
In 2011, Steep Canyon Rangers signed with Rounder Records with lead singer Woody Platt saying "[the Rangers] are honored to join Rounder Records and be a part of such a rich musical history." The band has recorded three records on the label as well as two collaborations with Steve Martin. Drummer and percussionist, Michael Ashworth, was added to the tour in 2013 and subsequently joined the Rangers as full-time member in the fall; Ashworth's performances feature a signature "box kit" consisting of multiple cajóns mixed with standard and modified drum hardware; it is sometimes referred to as a "cajón drum kit".

In 2013, the Steep Canyon Rangers' solo album Nobody Knows You won the Grammy Award for Best Bluegrass Album. The previous year, their 2012 collaboration with Martin, Rare Bird Alert, was nominated for the same award.

As of 2025, the Steep Canyon Rangers continue to tour the U.S. as well as appear with Martin and Martin Short in their comedy act "In a Very Stupid Conversation".

=== Personnel changes ===
In 2013, Mike Ashworth joined the Steep Canyon Rangers as their drummer.

On December 1, 2017, Charles Humphrey III (bass) announced that he was leaving the band to "pursue other musical and non-musical passions aside from Steep Canyon Rangers". Humphrey now tours with Songs from the Road Band.

In January 2018, Barrett Smith joined Steep Canyon Rangers performing bass and vocals.

In April 2022, founding band member and frontman Woody Platt announced his departure from SCR to spend more time with family. Later in 2022, guitarist and vocalist Aaron Burdett joined the band. The band's new lineup and producer Darrell Scott set up a makeshift studio at a mountaintop inn in Bat Cave, North Carolina to record Morning Shift, released in 2023.

== Discography ==
=== Albums ===
Albums by Steep Canyon Rangers
Title	Album details	Peak chart positions				Sales
Title	Album details	US Grass	US	US Folk	US Indie	Sales
Old Dreams and New Dreams	* Release date: August 14, 2001: Label: Steep Canyon Music	—	—	—	—	
Mr. Taylor's New Home	Release date: July 16, 2002; Label: Bonfire Records	—	—	—	—	
The Steep Canyon Rangers	Release date: June 1, 2004; Label: Rebel Records	—	—	—	—	
One Dime at a Time	Release date: September 13, 2005; Label: Rebel Records	13	—	—	—	
Lovin' Pretty Women	Release date: August 14, 2007; Label: Rebel Records	5	—	—	—	
Deep in the Shade	Release date: October 6, 2009; Label: Rebel Records	3	—	—	—	
Rare Bird Alert (with Steve Martin)	Release date: March 15, 2011; Label: Rounder Records	1	43	—	—	US: 50,600
Nobody Knows You	Release date: March 27, 2012; Label: Rounder Records	2	—	—	—	
Tell The Ones I Love	Release date: September 10, 2013; Label: Rounder Records	1	—	—	—	
Steve Martin and the Steep Canyon Rangers featuring Edie Brickell LIVE	Release date: March 11, 2014; Label: Rounder Records	1	—	5	—	
Radio	Release date: August 28, 2015; Label: Rounder Records	1	—	—	—	
The Long-Awaited Album (with Steve Martin)	Release date: September 22, 2017; Label: Rounder Records	1	189	7	—	
Out in the Open	Release date: January 26, 2018; Label: Ramseur Records	1	—	—	28	US: 4,600
North Carolina Songbook	Release date: November 29, 2019; Label: Yep Roc Records	1	—	—	29	US: 2,900
Be Still Moses	Release date: March 6, 2020; Label: Yep Roc Records	1		8		
Arm in Arm	Release date: October 16, 2020; Label: Yep Roc Records	2	—	4	24	
Morning Shift	Release date: September 8, 2023; Label: Yep Roc Records	—	—	—	—	
"—" denotes releases that did not chart

=== Singles ===
- "Me and Paul Revere" (Steve Martin and Steep Canyon Rangers) (2011)
- "Pretty Little One" (Steve Martin and Steep Canyon Rangers featuring Edie Brickell) (2014)
- "Test Of Time" (Duet with Steep Canyon Rangers and Edie Brickell) (2015)
- "California" (Steve Martin and Steep Canyon Rangers) (2020)

=== Music videos ===
Steep Canyon Rangers music videos
Year	Video	Director
2011	"Jubilation Day" (with Steve Martin)	Ryan Reichenfeld
2012	"Long Shot"	
2013	"Tell the Ones I Love"	Bill Filipiak
2015	"Radio"	Chris Bramley
2024	"Hominy Valley"	Peyton Lea
2024	"Deep End"	Abaigeal Brown
2024	"Recommend Me"	Peyton Lea
2025	"Can't Get Home"	Aidan Koppinger

== Awards and nominations ==
Year	Awarding Body	Category	Nominated work	Result
2006	IBMA Awards	Emerging Artist of the Year		Won
2011	IBMA Awards	Instrumental Song of the Year	Rare Bird Alert	Nominated
2011	IBMA Awards	Album of the Year	Rare Bird Alert	Nominated
2011	IBMA Awards	Entertainers of the Year		Won
2012	Grammy Awards	Best Album, Bluegrass	Rare Bird Alert	Nominated
2013	Grammy Awards	Best Album, Bluegrass	Nobody Knows You	Won
2021	Grammy Awards	Best Album, Bluegrass	North Carolina Songbook	Nominated
