= Woody Platt =

- Born: Alfred Francis Platt, III
- Origin: Brevard, North Carolina
- Genres: Bluegrass, rock
- Instruments: Guitar, vocals
- Labels: Rounder Records
- Website: SteepCanyon.com

Alfred Francis Platt III, known as Woody Platt, is a Grammy Award-winning, American guitar player and vocalist specializing in bluegrass music. He is best known for his work with the band Steep Canyon Rangers along with banjo player and comedian Steve Martin.
